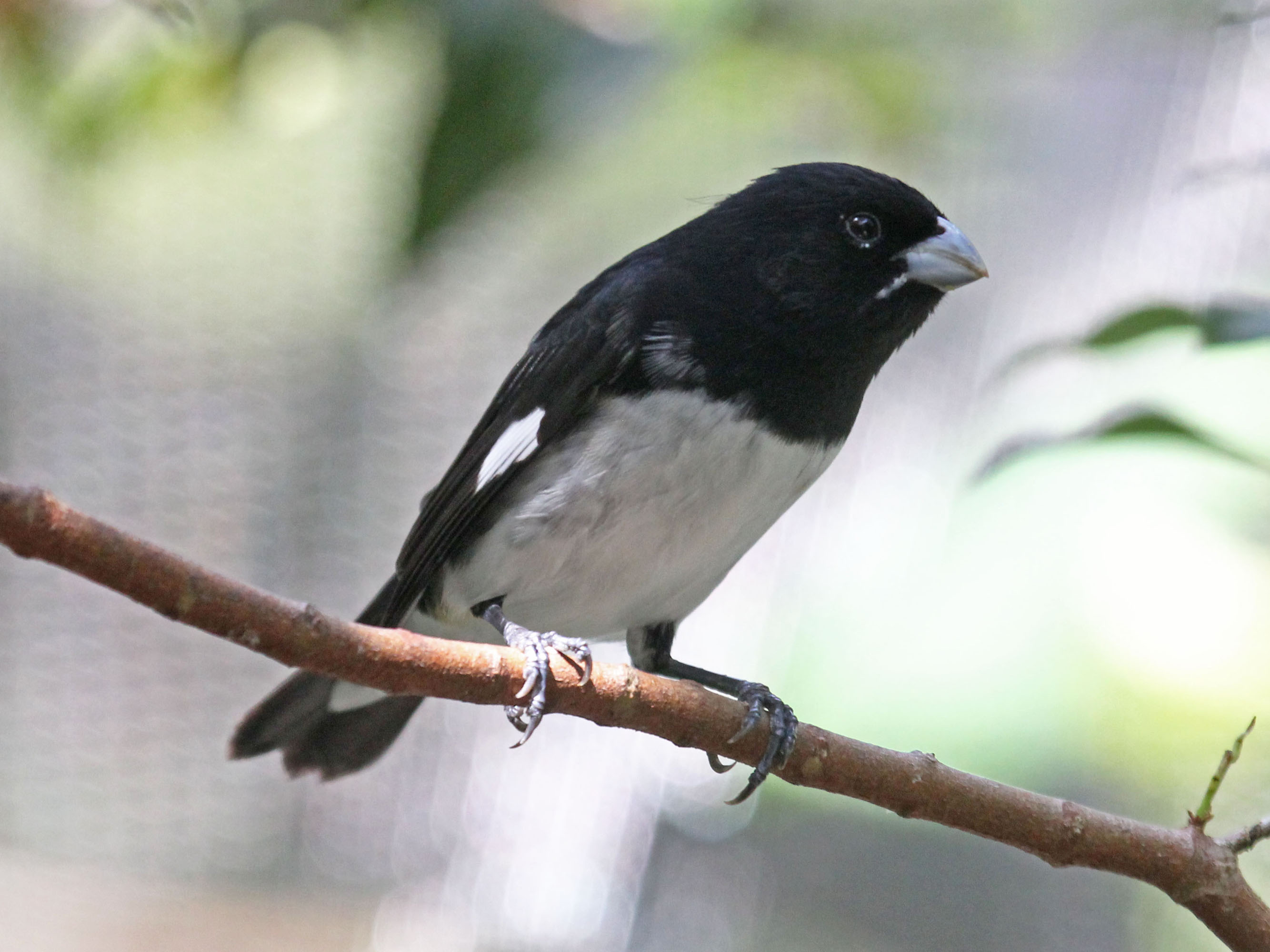
- Captive male
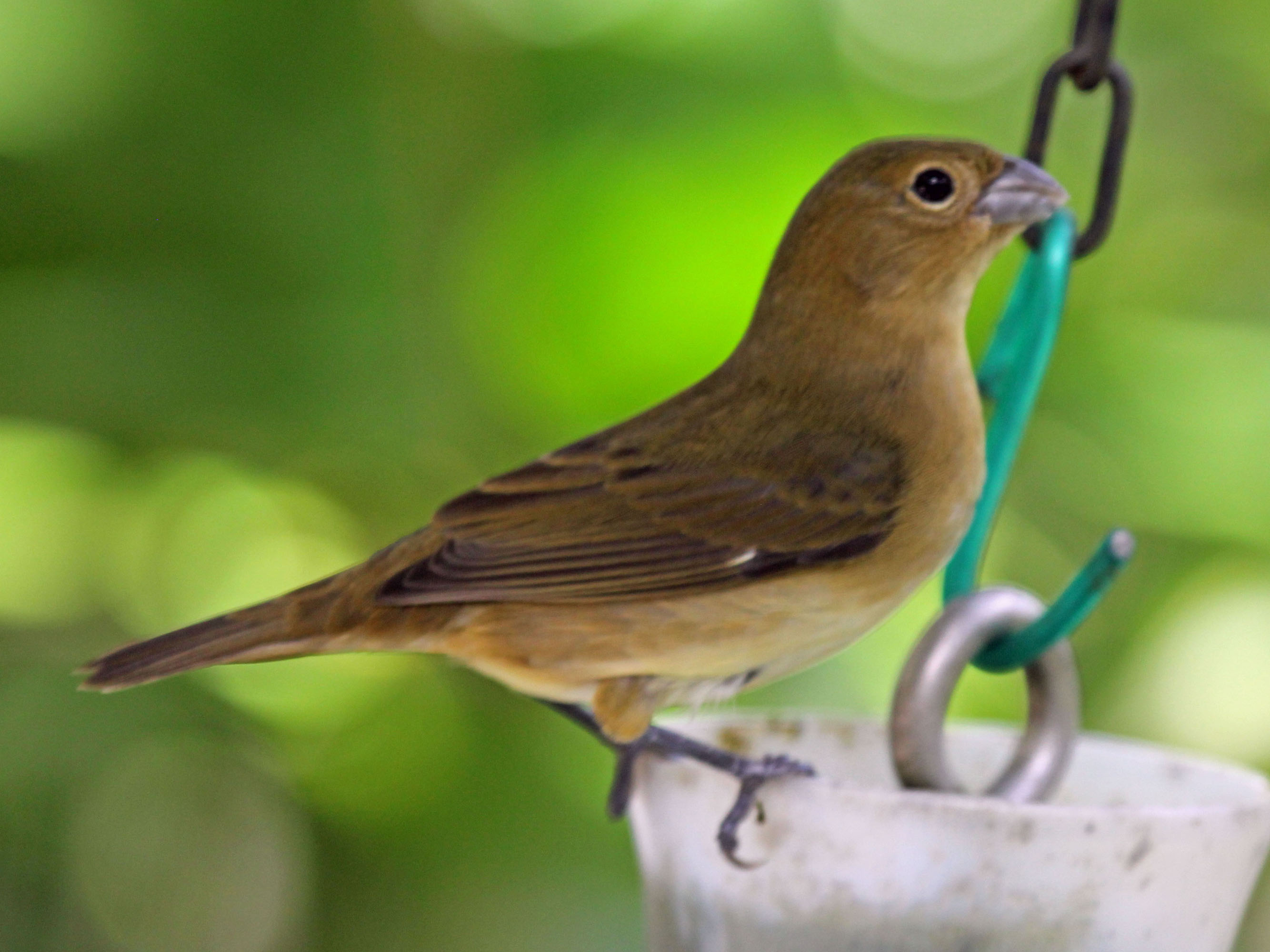
- Female

Conservation status
- Least Concern (IUCN 3.1)

Scientific classification
- Kingdom: Animalia
- Phylum: Chordata
- Class: Aves
- Order: Passeriformes
- Family: Thraupidae
- Genus: Sporophila
- Species: S. luctuosa

Binomial name
- Sporophila luctuosa (Lafresnaye, 1843)

= Black-and-white seedeater =

Species of bird

The black-and-white seedeater (Sporophila luctuosa) is a species of bird in the family Thraupidae, the tanagers and allies. It is found in Bolivia, Colombia, Ecuador, Peru, Venezuela, and as a vagrant to Brazil.

== Taxonomy and systematics ==
The black-and-white seedeater has a complicated taxonomic history. It was formally described in 1843 with the binomial Spermophila luctuosa. By 1938 it had been reassigned to its present genus Sporophila, which at the time was a member of the family Fringillidae. By 1970 Sporophila had been reassigned to the family Emberizidae. Based on studies published between 1988 and 2011, beginning in 2012 the genus was moved to its present position in the tanager family Thraupidae.

The black-and-white seedeater is monotypic.

== Description ==
The black-and-white seedeater is about 11 cm (4.3 in) long and weighs an average of 12.5 g (0.44 oz). It has a short thick bill with a rounded culmen. The species is sexually dimorphic. Adult males have a black head and neck with a thin white crescent under the eye. Their upperparts and tail are black. Their wings are mostly black with white bases on the primaries that show as a patch on the folded wing. Their throat and flanks are black and sharply demarcated from the white underparts. Adult females have a buffy brown crown and a paler, warmer, buffy brown face. Their nape, upperparts, wings, and tail are also buffy brown. Their throat, breast, flanks, and crissum are pale warm cinnamon and their belly and undertail coverts are a paler buff. Juveniles resemble adult females. Both sexes have a dark brown iris and blackish legs. Males have a blue-gray bill and females a blackish bill. Juveniles resemble adult females.

== Distribution and habitat ==
The black-and-white seedeater is found in the Venezuelan Andes from northeastern Trujillo south through all three ranges of the Colombian Andes and continuing south in the Andes through Ecuador and Peru into central Bolivia. The species has also been observed a few times as a vagrant in extreme western Brazil.

The black-and-white seedeater inhabits grassy areas within and at the edges of forest, pastures, and shrubby areas. In Venezuela it ranges in elevation between 900 and 3,100 m (3,000 and 10,200 ft) with most records between 1,400 and 2,200 m (4,600 and 7,200 ft). It occurs between 1,300 and 2,600 m (4,300 and 8,500 ft) in Colombia, locally as high as 2,400 m (7,900 ft) in Ecuador, and between 1,400 and 3,200 m (4,600 and 10,500 ft) but locally down to 450 m (1,500 ft) in Peru.

== Behavior ==
=== Movement ===
The black-and-white seedeater is a partial migrant though details of its movements are scant. It is also thought to be somewhat nomadic in search of grasses in seed. At least in Ecuador and Peru some individuals move from higher elevations east into the extreme western Amazon basin.

=== Feeding ===
The black-and-white seedeater feeds primarily on seeds; those of grasses and Chusquea bamboo are part of its diet. It takes seeds from grass while clinging to the stems. In the breeding season it usually forages in pairs; outside that time it forms flocks that may number 30 individuals of its species and other Sporophila species.

=== Breeding ===
The black-and-white seedeater's breeding season in Colombia includes September. In Peru its season spans at least April to August and in Ecuador it breeds "during the first half of the year". In Venezuela it possibly breeds in loose colonies. Nothing else is known about the species' breeding biology.

=== Vocalization ===
The black-and-white seedeater's song is described as "a distinctive, quite unmusical series of 6-8 rapidly delivered harsh notes, sometimes two-parted, with [an] almost icterid [blackbird-like] quality" that is unlike the song of any others of its genus. The species' calls include a "nasal nhhheep and harsher phhhp!".

== Status ==
The IUCN has assessed the black-and-white seedeater as being of Least Concern. It has a very large range; its population size is not known but is believed to be stable. No immediate threats have been identified. It is considered "very local" in Venezuela, "common but erratic" in Colombia, and "fairly common" in Peru. "This species’ liking for second-growth edge may lead to its having more habitat as montane forests are disturbed or degraded."

== Gallery ==
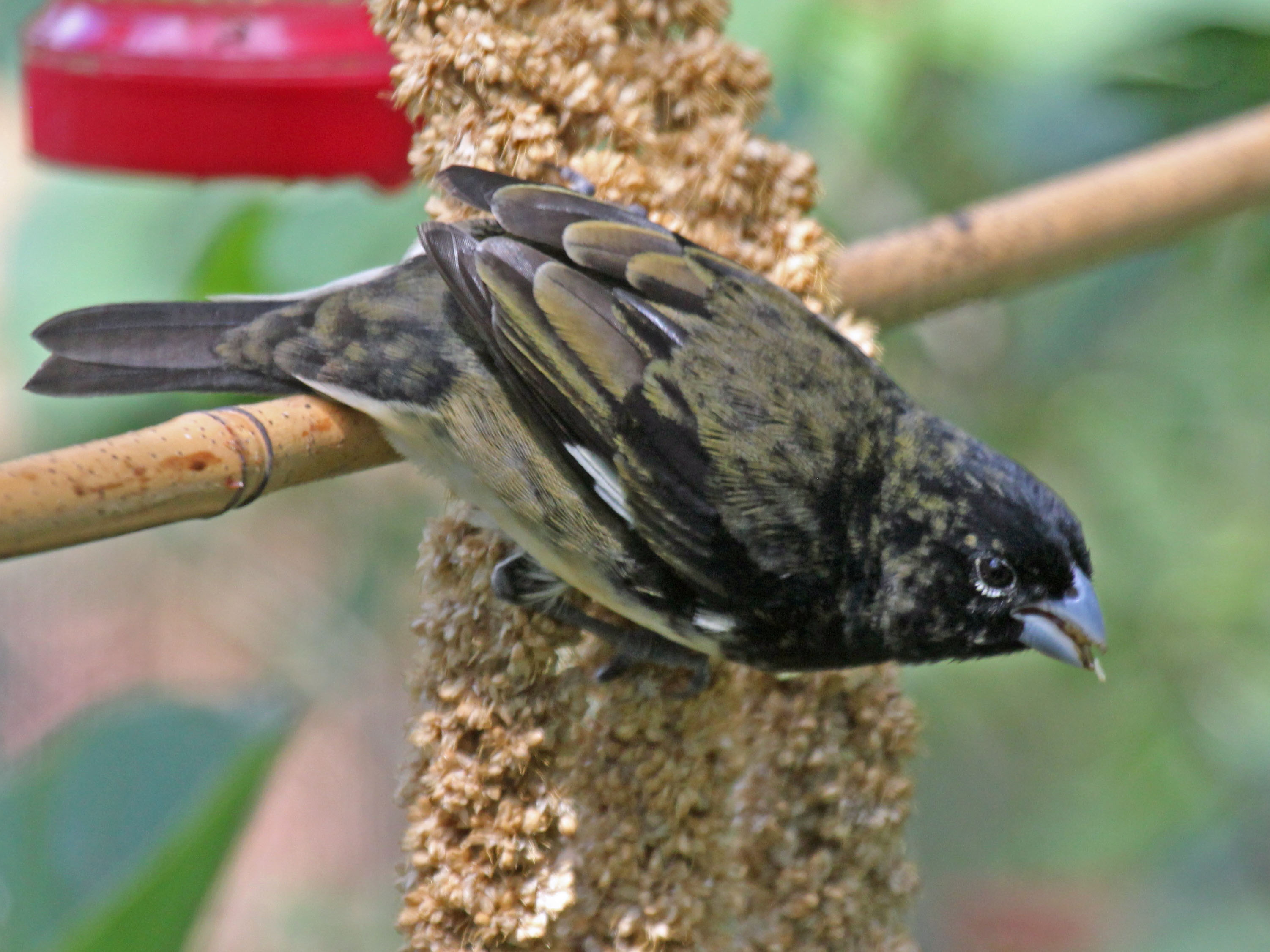
Captive male

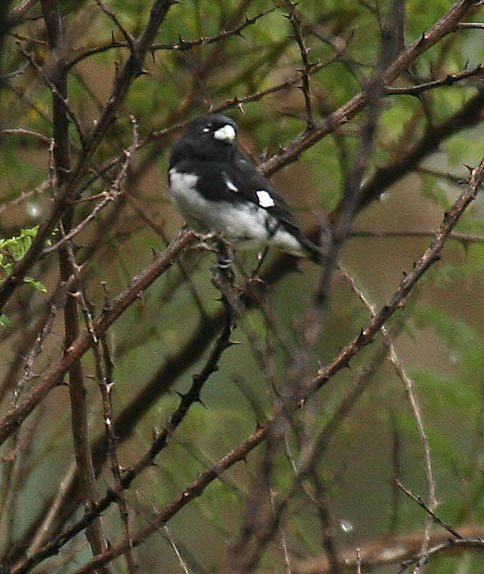
Male in Ecuador
