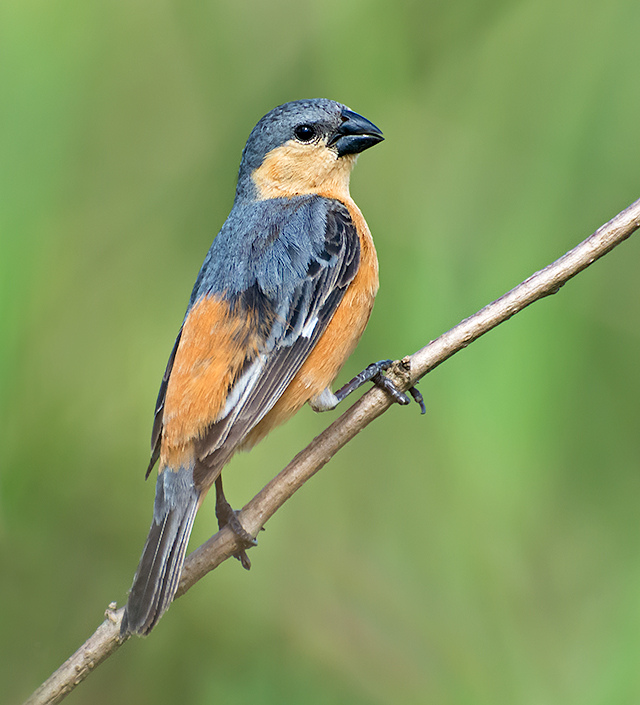

Conservation status
- Least Concern (IUCN 3.1)

Scientific classification
- Kingdom: Animalia
- Phylum: Chordata
- Class: Aves
- Order: Passeriformes
- Family: Thraupidae
- Genus: Sporophila
- Species: S. hypoxantha

Binomial name
- Sporophila hypoxantha Cabanis, 1851

= Tawny-bellied seedeater =

Species of bird

The tawny-bellied seedeater (Sporophila hypoxantha) is a species of bird in the family Thraupidae, the tanagers and allies. It is found in Argentina, Bolivia, Brazil, Paraguay, Uruguay, and as a vagrant to Peru.

== Taxonomy and systematics ==
The black-and-tawny seedeater has a somewhat complicated taxonomic history. It was formally described in 1851 with its current binomial Sporophila hypoxantha. The genus was then in the family Fringillidae. By 1938 it had been reclassified as a subspecies of Sporophila minuta, still in the family Fringillidae. By 1970 it had again been recognized as a full species, and the genus had been reassigned to the family Emberizidae. Based on studies published between 1988 and 2011, beginning in 2012 Sporophila was moved to the tanager family Thraupidae.

The tawny-bellied seedeater is monotypic.

== Description ==
The tawny-bellied seedeater is about 10 cm (3.9 in) long and weighs about 10.5 g (0.37 oz). It is one of the smallest of its genus. It has a short, thick bill with a rounded culmen. The species is sexually dimorphic. Adult males have a grayish crown and a tawny to rufous face. Their nape and upper back are grayish and their lower back and rump are tawny. Their tail is blackish with gray edges on the outer feathers. Their wings are dark grayish with sandy brown edges on the greater coverts and tertials. Their wing's primaries have white bases that sometimes shows as a very small patch on the folded wing. Their throat and underparts are tawny to pale rufous that is often darkest on the belly. Females have a sandy brown head with sometimes a paler buff forehead and supercilium. Their upperparts are also sandy brown. Their tail is darker brown. Their wings are darker brown with sandy edges on the coverts and tertials and a small whitish primary patch. Their underparts are warm buff that is palest in the middle of the throat and on the belly. Both sexes have a dark brown iris. Males have a black bill and legs; females have a dark horn-colored to blackish bill and legs. Juveniles resemble adult females.

== Distribution and habitat ==
The tawny-bellied seedeater is found from northern and eastern Bolivia south through most of Paraguay into northern Argentina narrowly to northern Córdoba Province, to northeastern Argentina to extreme northern Buenos Aires Province, and to western Uruguay. From those countries its range extends east through Brazil to the Atlantic. There its range's southern border is from northern Uruguay arcing north and east to Santa Catarina state. Its northern border is from Bolivia in far southwestern Mato Grosso northeast to north-central Goías and then south to southern São Paulo state. The South American Classification Committee also has records of the species as a vagrant in Peru.

The tawny-bellied seedeater inhabits tall moist grasslands, often near marshes or other moist landscapes. In elevation it ranges from sea level to 1,100 m (3,600 ft).

== Behavior ==
=== Movement ===
The populations of the tawny-bellied seedeater south of a line from Chaco Province in northeastern Argentina east to the Atlantic in Brazil's Paraná state are mostly or entirely migratory. They move north in February or March and return in November-December. The northern extent of their movement is not known but appears to be in central Brazil. (Note that the map does not reflect these breeding-only and year-round distributions.)

=== Feeding ===
The tawny-bellied seedeater feeds on grass seeds. It typically feeds while clinging to stems. It forages in small groups and sometimes in large ones that include other seed-eating species.

=== Breeding ===
The tawny-bellied seedeater breeds mostly between October and February but in some areas its season continues to April The female builds the nest, a cup made of grass well-hidden in a shrub or among dense grass. It is placed up to about 1 m (3 ft) above the ground but usually does not exceed half that height. The clutch is two or three eggs that are cream-colored with dark markings. The female alone incubates, for 11 to 12 days, and fledging occurs about nine or 10 days after hatch. The female feeds young nestlings and both parents feed older ones.

=== Vocalization ===
The tawny-bellied seedeater's song is "simple and sweet, comprising clear descending whistles...cheeu cheeu chewee chu". However, at least five geographical variants have been identified. Its usual call is "a mellow, descending pheeooo; [it] also gives [a] thin tsi or tsit".

== Status ==
The IUCN has assessed the tawny-bellied seedeater as being of Least Concern. It has a very large range; its population size is not known but is believed to be stable. No immediate threats have been identified. It is considered generally fairly common though rare and possibly extinct in Uruguay. It is "frequent to uncommon" in Brazil. "The old/tall grasslands required by this species are becoming less common throughout its range owing to conversion to commercial crops such as soya and sunflower, overgrazing and, in some areas, frequent burning."
