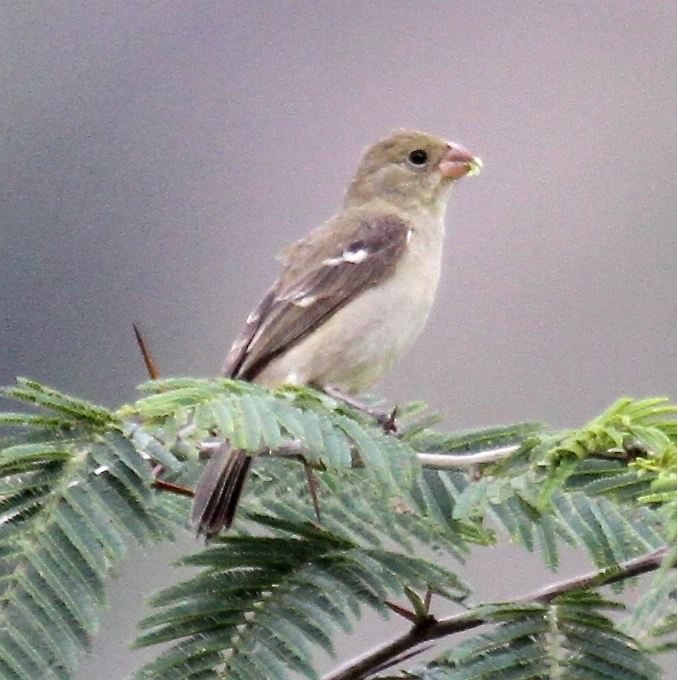

Conservation status
- Least Concern (IUCN 3.1)

Scientific classification
- Kingdom: Animalia
- Phylum: Chordata
- Class: Aves
- Order: Passeriformes
- Family: Thraupidae
- Genus: Sporophila
- Species: S. simplex

Binomial name
- Sporophila simplex (Taczanowski, 1874)

= Drab seedeater =

Species of bird

The drab seedeater (Sporophila simplex) is a species of bird in the family Thraupidae, the tanagers and allies. It is found in Ecuador and Peru.

== Taxonomy and systematics ==
The drab seedeater has a somewhat complicated taxonomic history. It was formally described in 1874 with the binomial Spermophila simplex. It was reassigned to its present genus Sporophila in 1892. At the time genus Sporophila was in the family Fringillidae. By 1970 the genus had been reassigned to the family Emberizidae. Based on studies published between 1988 and 2011, beginning in 2012 Sporophila was moved to the tanager family Thraupidae.

The drab seedeater is monotypic.

== Description ==
The drab seedeater is 11 to 11.5 cm (4.3 to 4.5 in) long. It has a short, thick bill with a rounded culmen. The species is sexually dimorphic though not dramatically so. Adult males have a grayish brown head and upperparts. Their tail is a darker grayish brown. Their wings are darker grayish brown with white tips on the greater and median coverts that show as two thin wing bars. The wings have white bases on the primaries that show as a patch on the closed wing. Their throat and underparts are whitish with a grayish to buff wash. Females have a brownish buff head, upperparts, wings, and tail. Their wings have whitish upper and buffy lower wing bars and a buffy white primary patch. Both sexes have a dark brown iris and black legs. Males have a dull yellow-orange bill and females a dusky maxilla and an orange-horn mandible.

== Distribution and habitat ==
The drab seedeater is found from intermontane valleys in the southern Ecuadoran provinces of Azuay and Loja south into the Marañón River valley in northern Peru to San Martín Department and also on the western Andean slope of Peru south to Ica Department. It inhabits arid scrublands, shrublands, and nearby agricultural lands. In Ecuador it ranges in elevation from 650 to 1,900 m (2,100 to 6,200 ft). In northern Peru it ranges from 500 to 2,500 m (1,600 to 8,200 ft) but is found down to sea level in the south.

== Behavior ==
=== Movement ===
The drab seedeater is a year-round resident.

=== Feeding ===
The drab seedeater feeds primarily on grass seeds. It usually feeds while clinging to stems. Outside the breeding season it usually forages in flocks.

=== Breeding ===
Nothing is known about the drab seedeater's breeding biology.

=== Vocalization ===
One description of the drab seedeater's song is "a series of short, rather harsh phrases, e.g. tche-tzjee-tzjee-tche-tjzeee-tjzeee-dzjit". Another is "a variable, rich, rapid jumble of warbled phrases and buzzes". Its calls are "a squeaky, rising zwee? and du".

== Status ==
The IUCN has assessed the drab seedeater as being of Least Concern. It has a large range; its population size is not known but is believed to be increasing. No immediate threats have been identified. It is considered local in Ecuador and uncommon in Peru.
