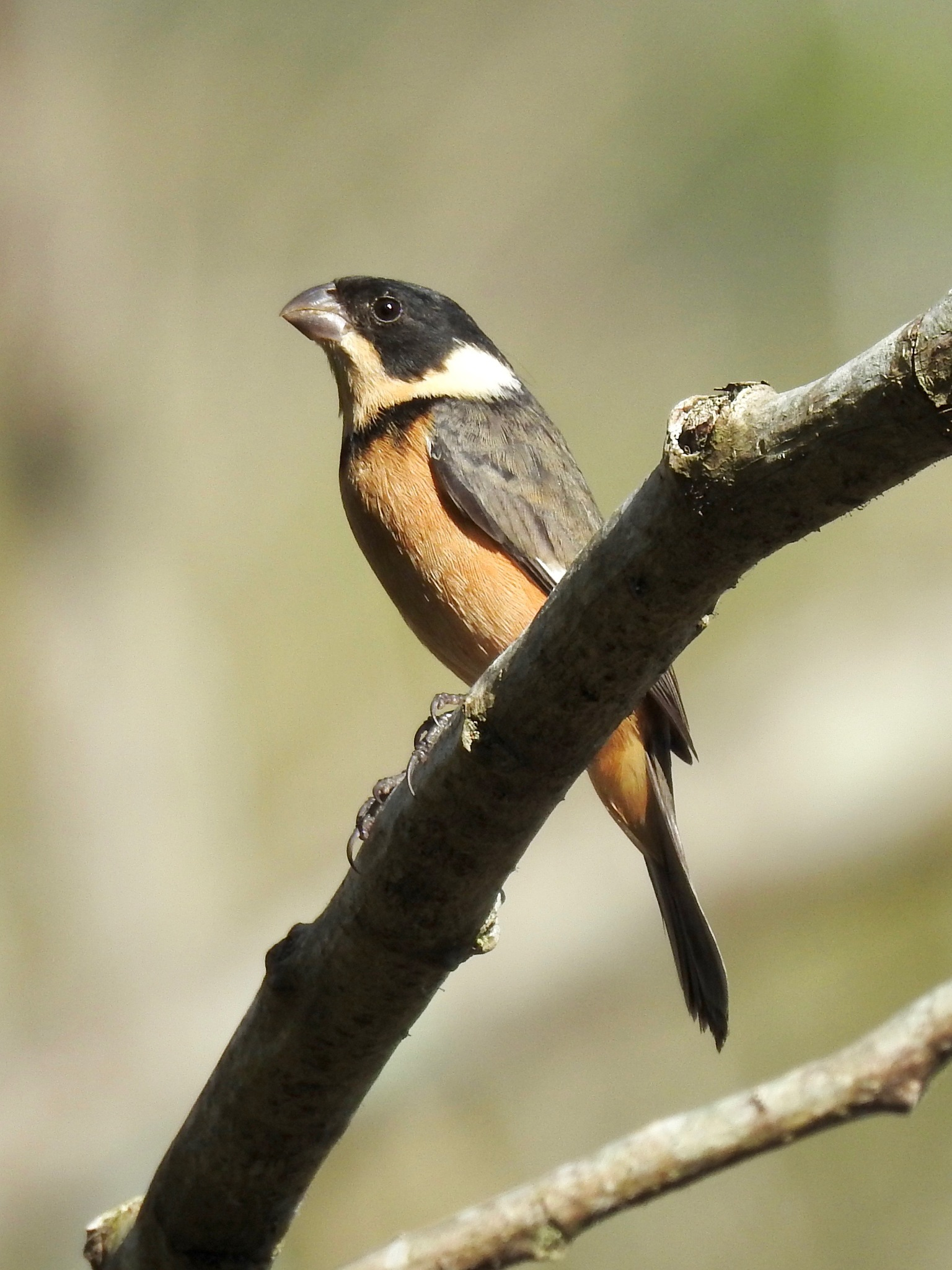

Conservation status
- Least Concern (IUCN 3.1)

Scientific classification
- Kingdom: Animalia
- Phylum: Chordata
- Class: Aves
- Order: Passeriformes
- Family: Thraupidae
- Genus: Sporophila
- Species: S. torqueola

Binomial name
- Sporophila torqueola (Bonaparte, 1850)

= Cinnamon-rumped seedeater =

Species of bird

The cinnamon-rumped seedeater (Sporophila torqueola) is a species of bird in the family Thraupidae, the tanagers and allies. It is endemic to Mexico.

== Taxonomy and systematics ==
The cinnamon-rumped seedeater has a complicated taxonomic history. It was formally described in 1850 with the binomial Spermophila torqueola. By 1938 it had been reassigned to its present genus Sporophila that had been introduced by the German ornithologist Jean Cabanis in 1844. At the time genus Sporophila was a member of the family Fringillidae. Also at that time it included three subspecies, S. t. torqueola, S. t. morelleti, and S. t. sharpei. By 1970 Sporophila had been reassigned to the family Emberizidae. Based on studies published between 1988 and 2011, beginning in 2012 the genus was moved to its present position in the tanager family Thraupidae.

By 2012 the species had also acquired two more subspecies, S. t. atriceps and S. t. mutanda and the English name "white-collared seedeater". Between 2016 and 2018 taxonomic systems split S. t. morelleti, S. t. sharpei, and S. t. mutanda from the other two as S. morelleti. The American Ornithological Society, the Clements taxonomy, and the IOC called the new species Morelet's seedeater. However, BirdLife International's Handbook of the Birds of the World (HBW) confusingly uses "white-collared seedeater", which had applied to S. torqueola, for Morelet's. The systems renamed the "leftover" S. t. torqueola and S. t. atriceps the cinnamon-rumped seedeater. A study published in 2018 showed that the cinnamon-rumped seedeater is more closely related to other Sporophila seedeaters than it is to Morelet's seedeater.

== Description ==
The cinnamon-rumped seedeater is 9.5 to 11 cm (3.7 to 4.3 in) long and weighs 8.6 to 10 g (0.30 to 0.35 oz). It has a short thick bill with a rounded culmen. The species is sexually dimorphic. Adult males of the nominate subspecies S. t. torqueola have a mostly blackish brown head with a whitish throat whose color extends back in a band across the side of the neck to the nape. Their nape and upperparts are blackish brown and their rump cinnamon. Their wings are mostly blackish with white bases on the primaries that show as a patch on the closed wing. Their tail is also blackish. They have a black band below the throat and pale cinnamon underparts that are palest on the belly and undertail coverts. Adult females have a grayish olive head and upperparts. Their wings and tail are dark brown with two whitish bars on the wings. Their throat and breast are pale creamy buff and their belly and vent pale cinnamon. Males of subspecies S. t. atriceps has a grayish brown to olivaceous brown back and a smaller white wing patch than the nominate. Females do not differ. Both sexes of both subspecies have a blackish iris and blackish legs. Males have a blackish bill and females a dark horn bill.

== Distribution and habitat ==
Subspecies S. t. atriceps of the cinnamon-rumped seedeater is the more northerly of the two. It is found along the Pacific side of Mexico from central Sinaloa and western Durango south to Nayarit and northern Jalisco and also in the far south of Baja California. The nominate is found from Jalisco and Guanajuato south to Oaxaca and as far east as Morelos and Puebla. The species inhabits open landscapes including grassy and weedy fields and pastures, croplands, moist savanna, and scrubby beaches. It favors areas with Polygonum grass. In elevation it ranges from near sea level to at least 2,000 m (6,600 ft).

== Behavior ==
=== Movement ===
The cinnamon-rumped seedeater is believed to be a year-round resident.

=== Feeding ===
The cinnamon-rumped seedeater feeds mostly on grass seeds, especially those of Polygonum, and much smaller amounts of berries and insects. In the breeding season it usually forages in pairs; at other times it is often in flocks of several hundred individuals that may include other seed-eating species.

=== Breeding ===
The cinnamon-rumped seedeater breeds between January and August. One nest has been found with two eggs. Nothing else is known about the species' breeding biology.

=== Vocalization ===
The cinnamon-rumped seedeater's song is "high-pitched and canary-like, a clear sweet sweet sweet cheer cheer cheer" and its call is "an abrupt chéh".

== Status ==
The IUCN has assessed the cinnamon-rumped seedeater as being of Least Concern. It has a large range; its estimated population of at least 5.8 million mature individuals is believed to be increasing. No immediate threats have been identified. It is "[c]ommon to fairly common [and] abundant in many parts of its range".
