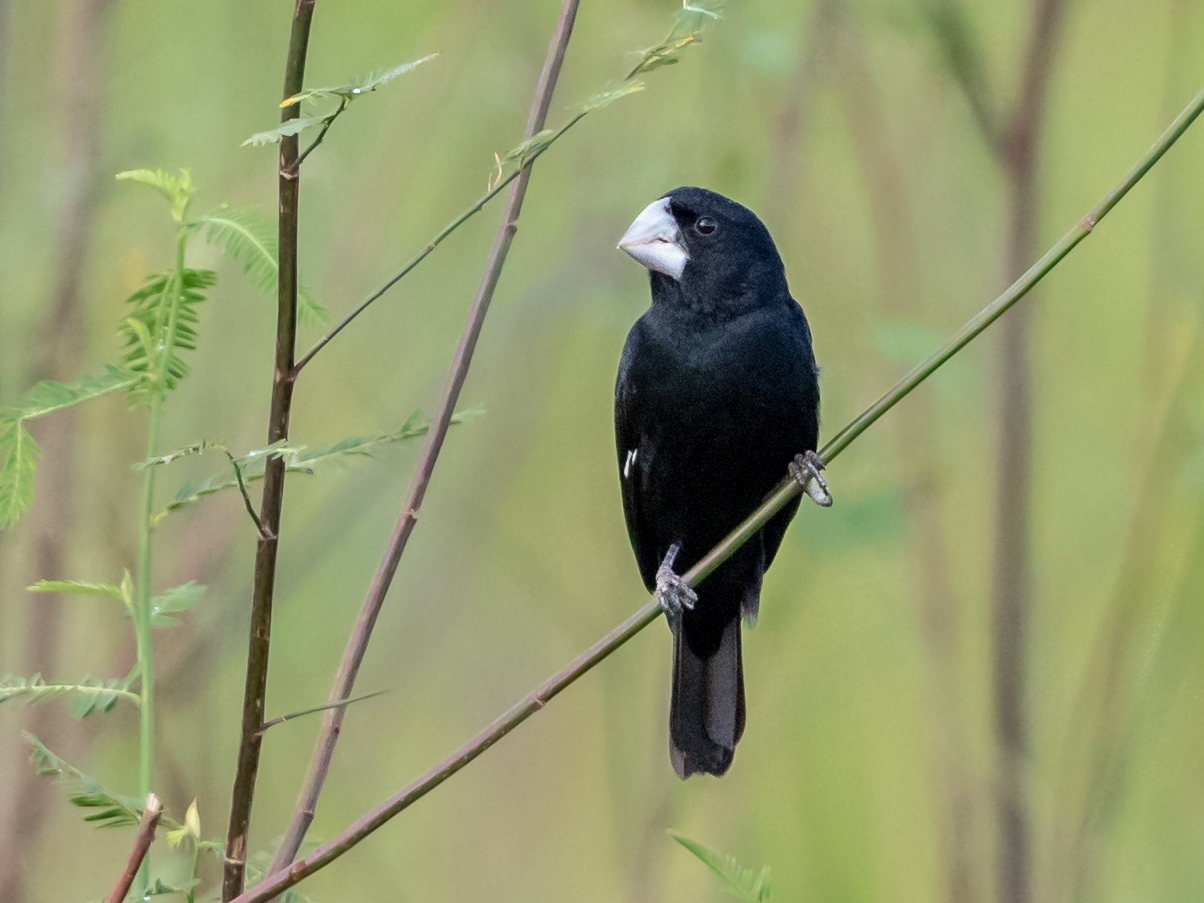
- male

Conservation status
- Endangered (IUCN 3.1)

Scientific classification
- Kingdom: Animalia
- Phylum: Chordata
- Class: Aves
- Order: Passeriformes
- Family: Thraupidae
- Genus: Sporophila
- Species: S. maximiliani

Binomial name
- Sporophila maximiliani (Cabanis, 1851)

Synonyms
- Oryzoborus maximiliani

= Great-billed seed finch =

Species of bird

The great-billed seed finch (Sporophila maximiliani) is a species of bird in the family Thraupidae. Its natural habitats are subtropical or tropical moist shrubland, swamps, and heavily degraded former forest. They are found in two separate general populations, one in the northern Amazon rainforest and the other in the Cerrado. They live in flooded areas with nests low to the ground. The adults express strong sexual dimorphism. Males are black with white under wing-coverts and ivory white bills, and the females are generally light brown with white under wing-coverts and black bills. Both the male and female have very large, thick bills. The great-billed seed finch has a melodious call, which has made it a target for trapping.

Although the population is quickly declining due to trapping and loss of habitat, not much is known about its behavior and ecology.

== Taxonomy ==
The great-billed seed finch was called Fringilla crassirostris when a female was collected on the eastern coast of Brazil in 1815 by Prince Maximilian of Wied-Neuwied. Twenty years after his description was published, the seed finch was included in the newly proposed genus Oryzoborus by Jean Louis Cabanis (1851).

The seed finches were once categorized in the genus Oryzoborus. They are a group of six species: the chestnut-bellied seed finch (Oryzoborus angolensis), large-billed seed finch (Oryzoborus crassirostris), black-billed seed finch (Oryzoborus atrirostris), thick-billed seed finch (Oryzoborus funereus), great-billed seed finch (Oryzoborus maximiliani), and the Nicaraguan seed finch (Oryzoborus nuttingi). The females of seed finches are very similar in morphology. The taxonomy is therefore almost exclusively based on the male plumages. Categorization of the seed finches had been historically based on male plumage patterning with color groups such as gray and chestnut-colored. Further molecular and morphological analyses of the birds led to the genus Oryzoborus being subsumed into the genus Sporophila.

The great-billed seed finch includes two subspecies:

- S. m. maximiliani which is found mainly in Cerrado, eastern Bolivia, and in the Brazilian states of Goiás, Bahia, Minas Gerais, Espirito Santo, São Paulo, Mato Grosso, and Mato Grosso do Sul.
- S. m. parkesi which is found in southeastern Sucre to Elta Amacuro, northern South America, eastern Venezuela, northern Bolivia, western Guyana, and the northernmost part of Brazil.

== Description ==
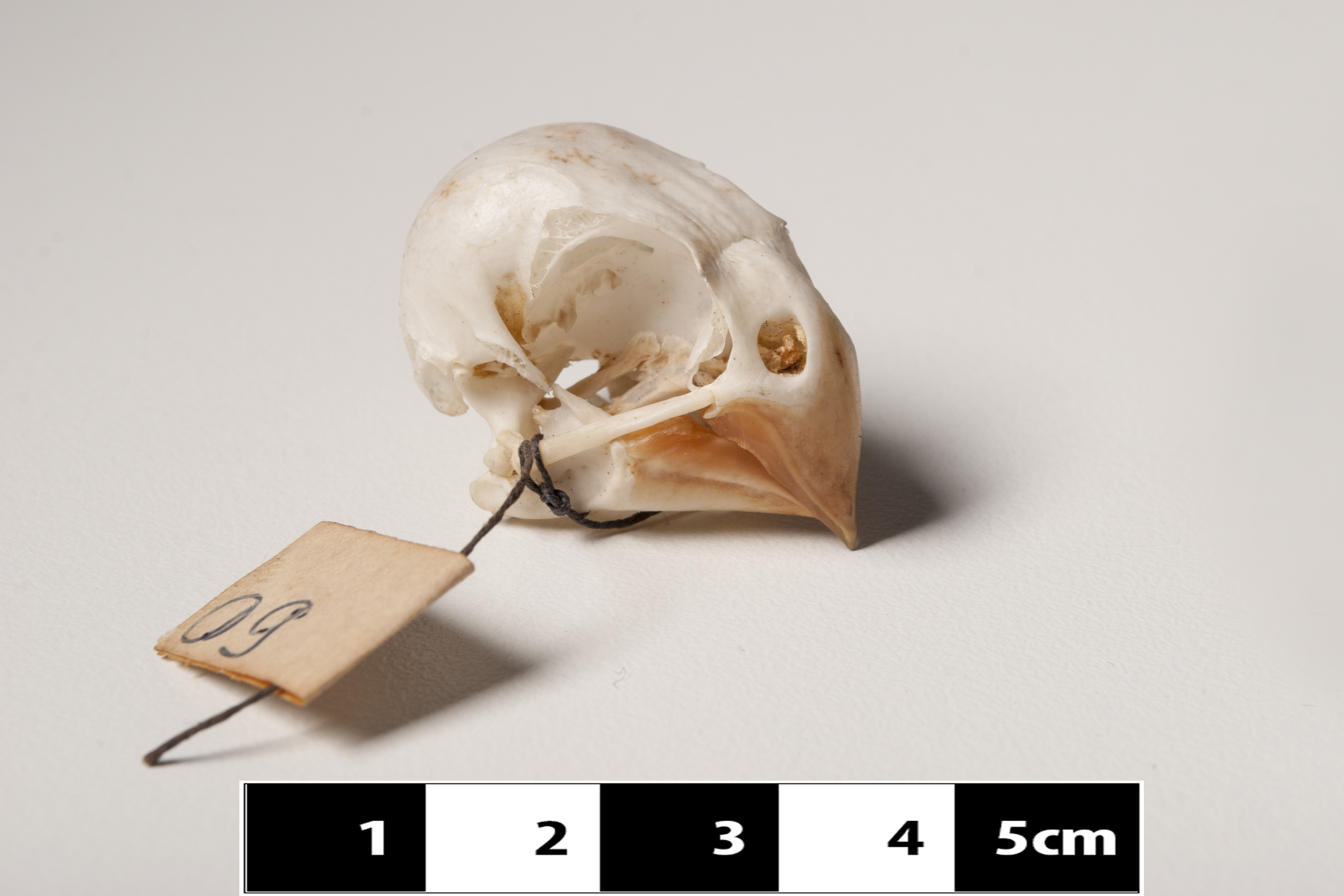
great-billed seed finch skull

The great-billed seed finch is sexually dimorphic. They have an extremely large and thick bill, that is chalky white in males and black in females. The beak volume is about 840mm³. The males are black with white or white and black under wing-coverts. The females have a warm brown back and a buffy brown belly with white under wing-coverts. The females are very similar to other adult females of the Sporophila genus. Both the male and female great-billed seed finch are very similar in appearance to the male and female large-billed seed finch. It is a medium-sized finch at around 14.5–16.5 cm (5.7–6.5 in) in length. The juvenile is similar in appearance to the female. Sexual dimorphism presents itself in males when they begin to sing. The male juvenile eventually moults its black feathers, having a patchy appearance for several months until it is fully black.

Due to their similarity with other species, sexual dimorphism, and juvenile appearance, great-billed seed finches can be very difficult to identify morphologically.

The eggs of the great-billed seed finch are grayish white with black blotches and light brown spots.

== Distribution and habitat ==
The great-billed seed finch exists in two separate populations in South America. The southern population is found in the Cerrado and in the Cerrado enclaves into the transition zones in Atlantic Forest. The northern population is found in the northern Amazon rainforest.

The great-billed seed finch is specialized to live in humid environments and is often associated with flooded areas and marshy borders.

== Ecology and behavior ==
=== Feeding ===
The great-billed seed finch is predominantly granivorous and feeds mainly on seeds of many species in the Cyperaceae family. They are usually found in pairs. Not much more is known.

=== Breeding ===
Breeding season generally begins around November or December during spring and summer in central and southern Brazil and extends until the end of February or early March. Breeding in the great-billed seed finch is stimulated by the first torrential rains of spring. The spring rains cause the fruiting of the Cyperaceae species, which then produce mature seeds in the middle of the rainy season. During breeding season, the seed finch is especially territorial and aggressive. Their nests are cup-shaped and anywhere from one to three meters high. They lay eggs in clutch sizes of two to three eggs which are incubated by the female.

== Relationship with humans ==
The three larger seed finches (large-billed seed finch, black-billed seed finch, and great-billed seed finch), have been hunted by bird trappers and have thus had a severe and steady decline in population. They are sought after for their melodious song. The species are also facing a decline in population due to the loss of habitat. The native grasslands that the seed finches nest in are being converted into agricultural fields. Manmade fires for the purpose of agriculture and cattle ranching as well as aerial pesticides also impact the population of the seed finch.

== Status ==
It is rare to uncommon. The population size is decreasing and there is estimated to be anywhere from 1000-2499 individuals. The International Union for Conservation of Nature (IUCN) considers the species to be a species that is endangered globally.
