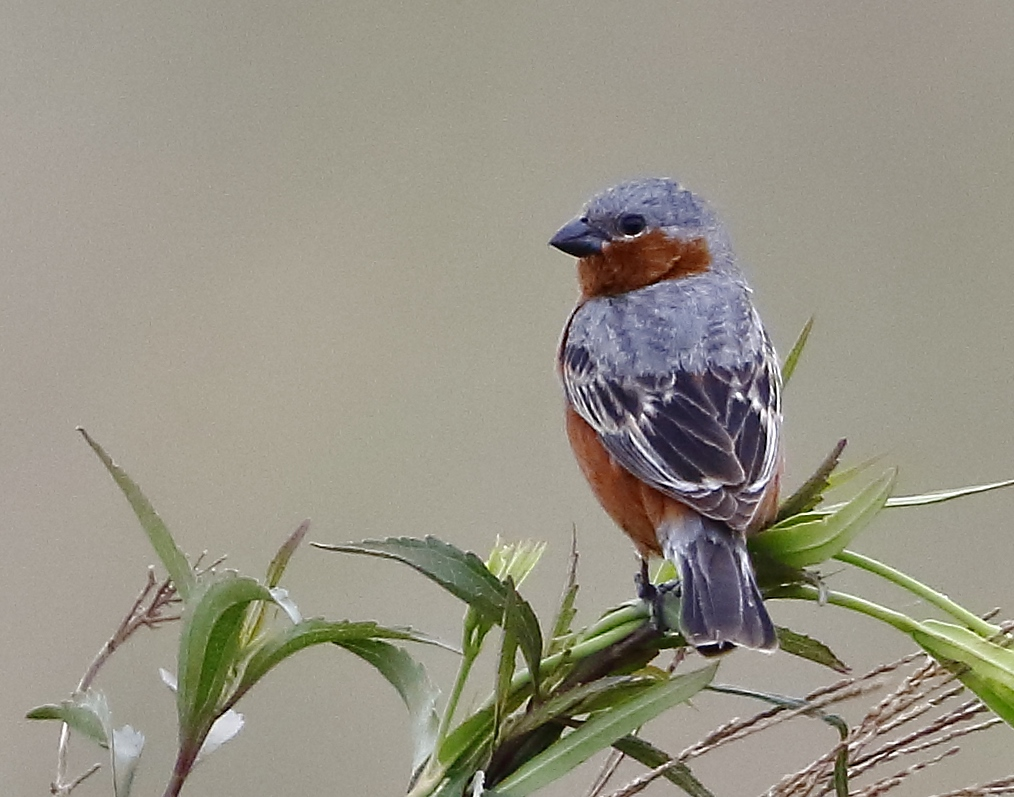

Conservation status
- Near Threatened (IUCN 3.1)

Scientific classification
- Kingdom: Animalia
- Phylum: Chordata
- Class: Aves
- Order: Passeriformes
- Family: Thraupidae
- Genus: Sporophila
- Species: S. hypochroma

Binomial name
- Sporophila hypochroma Todd, WEC, 1915
- Breeding Non-Breeding

= Rufous-rumped seedeater =

Species of bird

The rufous-rumped seedeater (Sporophila hypochroma), also known as the grey-and-chestnut seedeater, is a Near Threatened species of bird in the family Thraupidae, the tanagers and allies. It is found in Argentina, Bolivia, Brazil, Paraguay, and Uruguay.

== Taxonomy and systematics ==
The rufous-rumped seedeater has a somewhat complicated taxonomic history. It was formally described in 1915 with its current binomial Sporophila hypochroma. The genus was then in the family Fringillidae. By 1970 the genus Sporophila had been reassigned to the family Emberizidae. Based on studies published between 1988 and 2011, beginning in 2012 Sporophila was moved to the tanager family Thraupidae.

The rufous-rumped seedeater is monotypic.

== Description ==
The rufous-rumped seedeater is about 10 cm (3.9 in) long; one young male weighed 9.7 g (0.34 oz). It is one of the smallest of its genus. It has a smallish bill with a rounded culmen. The species is sexually dimorphic. Adult males have a grayish crown and nape that give a "helmeted" appearance; the rest of their face is chestnut. Their mantle and upper back are grayish and their lower back and rump are chestnut. Their tail is mostly blackish with gray edges on the outer feathers. Their wings are blackish with white bases on the primaries that show as a patch on the folded wing. Their tertials are black with gray edges. Their throat and underparts are chestnut. Females have a sandy brown head with often a paler buff forehead and supercilium. Their upperparts are also warm brown and their tail is darker brown. Their wings are darker brown with sandy edges on the tertials and a small whitish primary patch like the male's. Their underparts are warm buff that is palest in the middle of the throat and on the belly. Both sexes have a dark brown iris. Males have a dark gray to black bill and legs; females have a dark horn-colored to blackish bill and dusky legs. Juveniles resemble adult females.

== Distribution and habitat ==
The rufous-rumped seedeater is found from northern Buenos Aires Province in Argentina north in a narrow strip to eastern Chaco and eastern Formosa provinces; the strip includes far western Uruguay. From there its range expands into eastern Paraguay and then northwest, north, and northeast to a line from western Beni Department in northern Bolivia east to southern Minas Gerais in Brazil. However, within that overall range it appears to have a disjunct distribution with centers in eastern Bolivia and northeastern Argentina. The rufous-rumped seedeater inhabits tall grasslands near marshes and other open wetlands. In elevation it ranges from sea level to 1,100 m (3,600 ft).

== Behavior ==
=== Movement ===
The rufous-rumped seedeater is migratory but details of its movements, including the exact range of its non-breeding period, are lacking.

=== Feeding ===
The rufous-rumped seedeater feeds on grass seeds. It typically feeds while clinging to stems. It forages in small groups and sometimes in larger ones that include other seed-eating species.

=== Breeding ===
The rufous-rumped seedeater breeds between December and February, and apparently only in seasonally wet grasslands at low elevations. One nest in Uruguay held two eggs. Nothing else is known about the species' breeding biology.

=== Vocalization ===
The rufous-rumped seedeater's song is "a long warble with many inflected ascending or descending nasal whistles" and its call "a rising pwee".

== Status ==
The IUCN originally in 1988 assessed the rufous-rumped seedeater as Threatened and since 1994 as Near Threatened. It has an apparently disjunct distribution; its population size is not known and is believed to be decreasing. "Widespread destruction and modification of grasslands in central South America for mechanised agriculture, intensive cattle-grazing and afforestation with non-native tree genera, and pressure from trappers suggest that the species is declining rapidly." It is "[g]enerally uncommon to rare, and very patchily distributed". It is "uncommon to rare" in Brazil.
