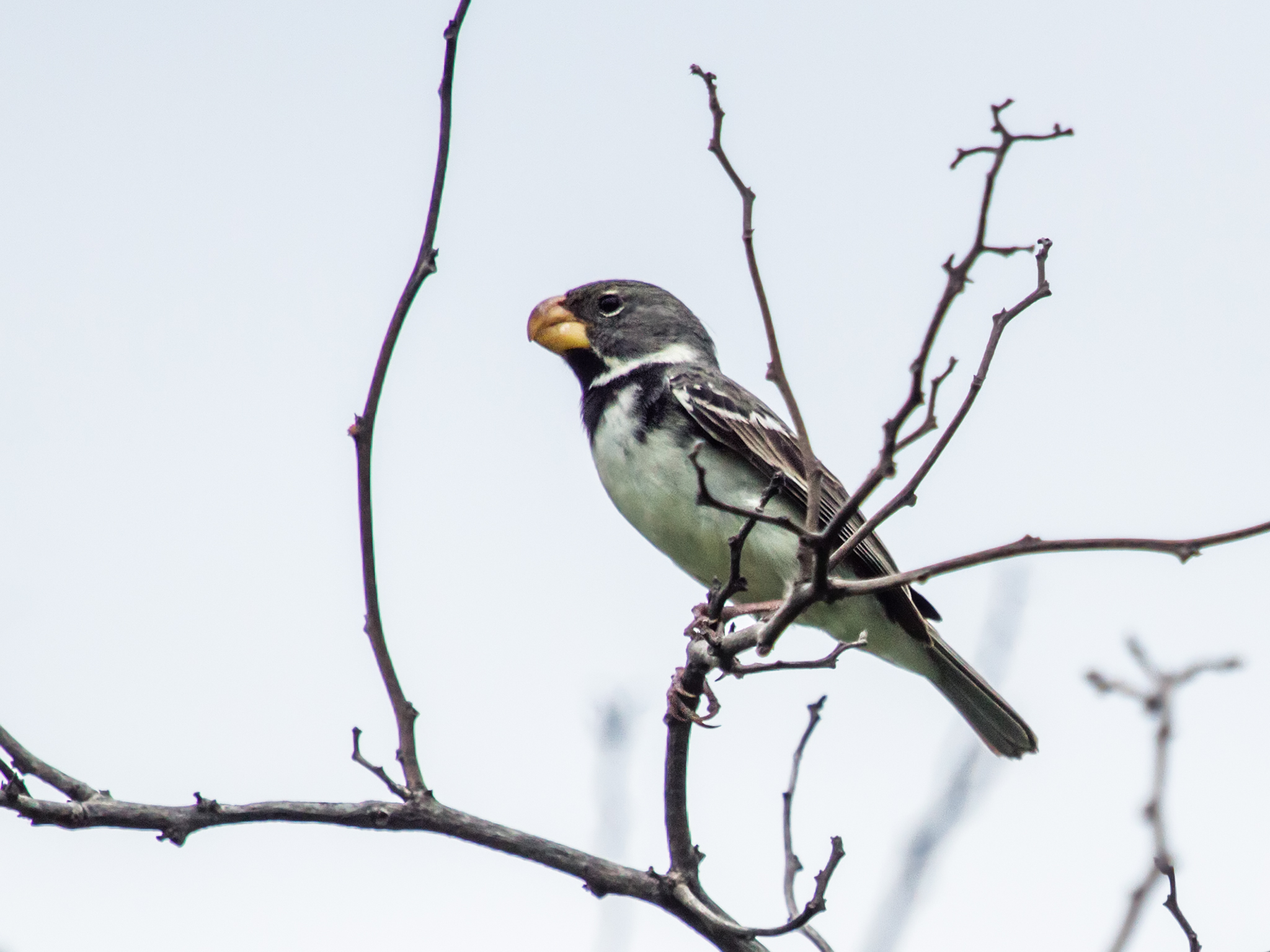
- Male
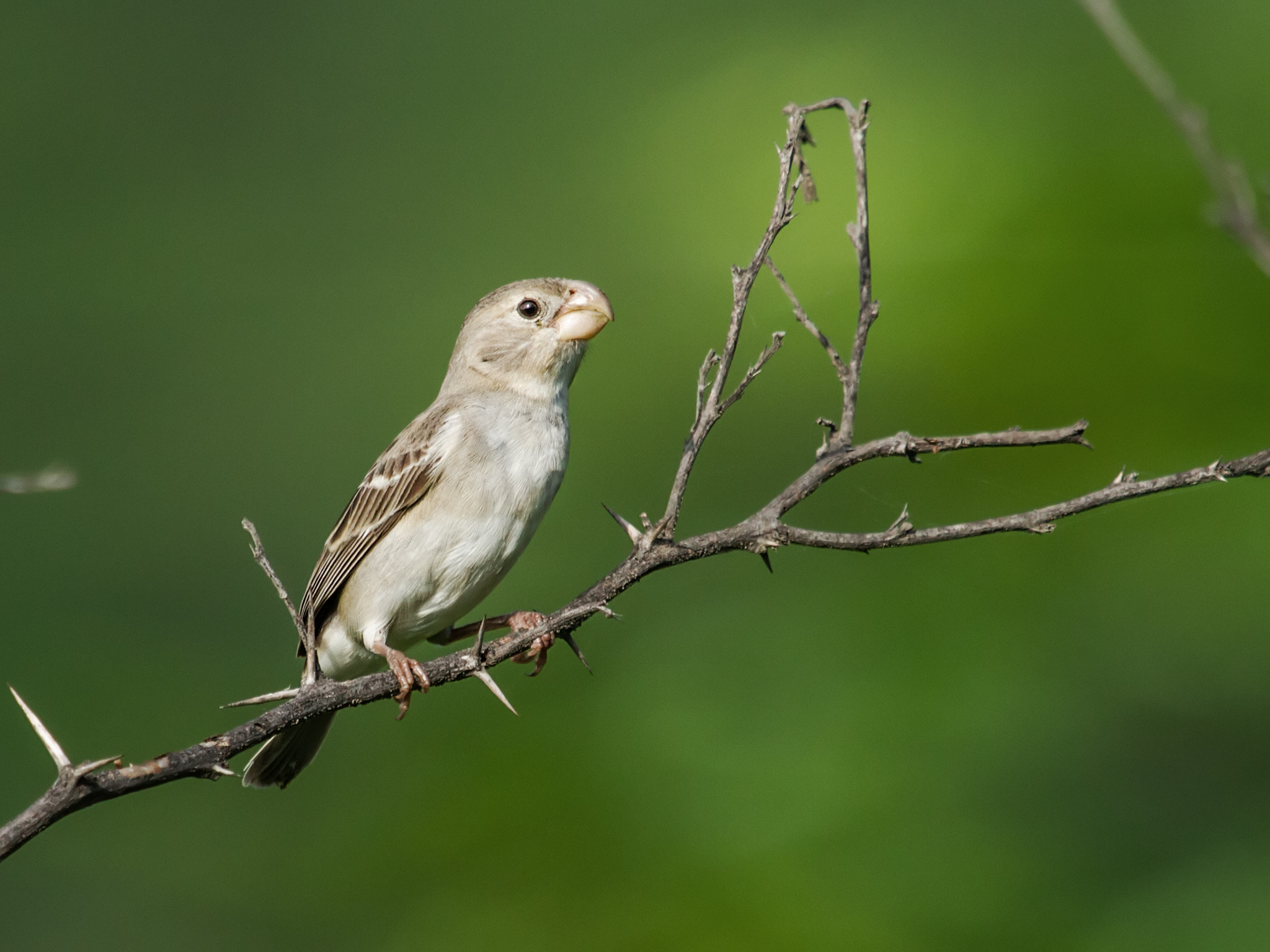
- Female

Conservation status
- Least Concern (IUCN 3.1)

Scientific classification
- Kingdom: Animalia
- Phylum: Chordata
- Class: Aves
- Order: Passeriformes
- Family: Thraupidae
- Genus: Sporophila
- Species: S. peruviana

Binomial name
- Sporophila peruviana (Lesson, RP, 1842)

= Parrot-billed seedeater =

Species of bird

The parrot-billed seedeater (Sporophila peruviana) is a species of bird in the family Thraupidae, the tanagers and allies. It is found in Ecuador and Peru.

== Taxonomy and systematics ==
The parrot-billed seedeater has a complicated taxonomic history. It was formally described in 1842 by René-Primevère Lesson with the binomial Callyrhynchus peruvianus. Lesson erected the genus Callyrhynchus for the species. In 1869 Philip Sclater erected a new genus for it, Neorhynchus, because he misspelled Lesson's Callyrhynchus as Callirhynchus, a genus of fishes. By the principle of priority the apparently previously assigned genus had to be changed. It was still in that genus in 1938 but by 1970 had attained its current place in Sporophila. Sporophila was a genus in the family Emberizidae. Based on studies published between 1988 and 2011, beginning in 2012 Sporophila was moved to the tanager family Thraupidae.

The parrot-billed seedeater has two subspecies, the nominate S. p. peruviana (Lesson, RP, 1842) and S. p. devronis (Verreaux, 1852).

== Description ==
The parrot-billed seedeater is 10.5 to 12.5 cm (4.1 to 4.9 in) long and weighs an average of 12.6 g (0.44 oz). It is a small seedeater with a "massively thick bill showing [a] distinct rounded culmen and slightly hooked tip...appearing like that of a parrot". The species is sexually dimorphic. Adult males of the nominate subspecies have a grayish head with a thin white eye-ring and a white cheek. Their upperparts are grayish brown. Their tail is mostly gray-brown with blackish central feathers. Their wings are grayish brown with buffy edges and whitish tips on the coverts that show as two wing bars. The wings have white bases on the primaries that show as a patch on the closed wing. They have a blackish throat with a white band between it and a dark gray to blackish upper breast. Their underparts are otherwise mostly white with a buffy wash on the flanks. Females have a dusty brown head, upperparts, wings, and tail. Their wings have two faint wing bars and a small whitish patch. Their underparts are off-white with a buffy brown wash on the breast. Subspecies S. p. devronis is smaller than the nominate and has a smaller bill but both sexes are otherwise like the nominate ones. Both sexes of both subspecies have a dark brown iris and grayish legs. Males have an apricot-yellow bill and females a pale horn one with often a duskier maxilla.

== Distribution and habitat ==
The parrot-billed seedeater is found in the coastal lowlands of Ecuador and Peru. Subspecies S. p. devronis is the more northerly of the two. It is found from southern two-thirds of Ecuador's Manabí Province south into northwestern Peru to Lambayeque Department. The nominate is found from La Libertad and far western Cajamarca departments south at least to Ica Department. The species inhabits arid grasslands and shrublands, agricultural areas, and overgrown fields. It ranges in elevation from sea level to 800 m (2,600 ft) in Ecuador and to 600 m (2,000 ft) in Peru.

== Behavior ==
=== Movement ===
The parrot-billed seedeater is mostly a sedentary year-round resident though there is evidence of some seasonal movements.

=== Feeding ===
The parrot-billed seedeater feeds primarily on grass seeds. It feeds mostly on the ground. During the breeding season it typically forages singly, in pairs, or small groups and outside it may gather in very large flocks at water sources. The flocks often include other seed-eating species.

=== Breeding ===
The parrot-billed seedeater breeds during the wet season of February to April and may raise more than one brood in wetter years. Its nest is made from plant fibers, usually in a bush, and often high above the ground. The clutch size, incubation period, time to fledging, and details of parental care are not known. The shiny cowbird (Molothrus bonariensis) is sometimes a brood parasite.

=== Vocalization ===
The male parrot-billed seedeater sings from a hidden perch "persistently, a short phrase of harsh unmusical notes, e.g. jew-jee-jew". A different description of the song is "a short series of musical, deep, buzzy notes, usually introduced with a series of rising djzureet? notes".

== Status ==
The IUCN has assessed the parrot-billed seedeater as being of Least Concern. Its population size is not known but is believed to be increasing. No immediate threats have been identified. It is considered fairly common to common.
