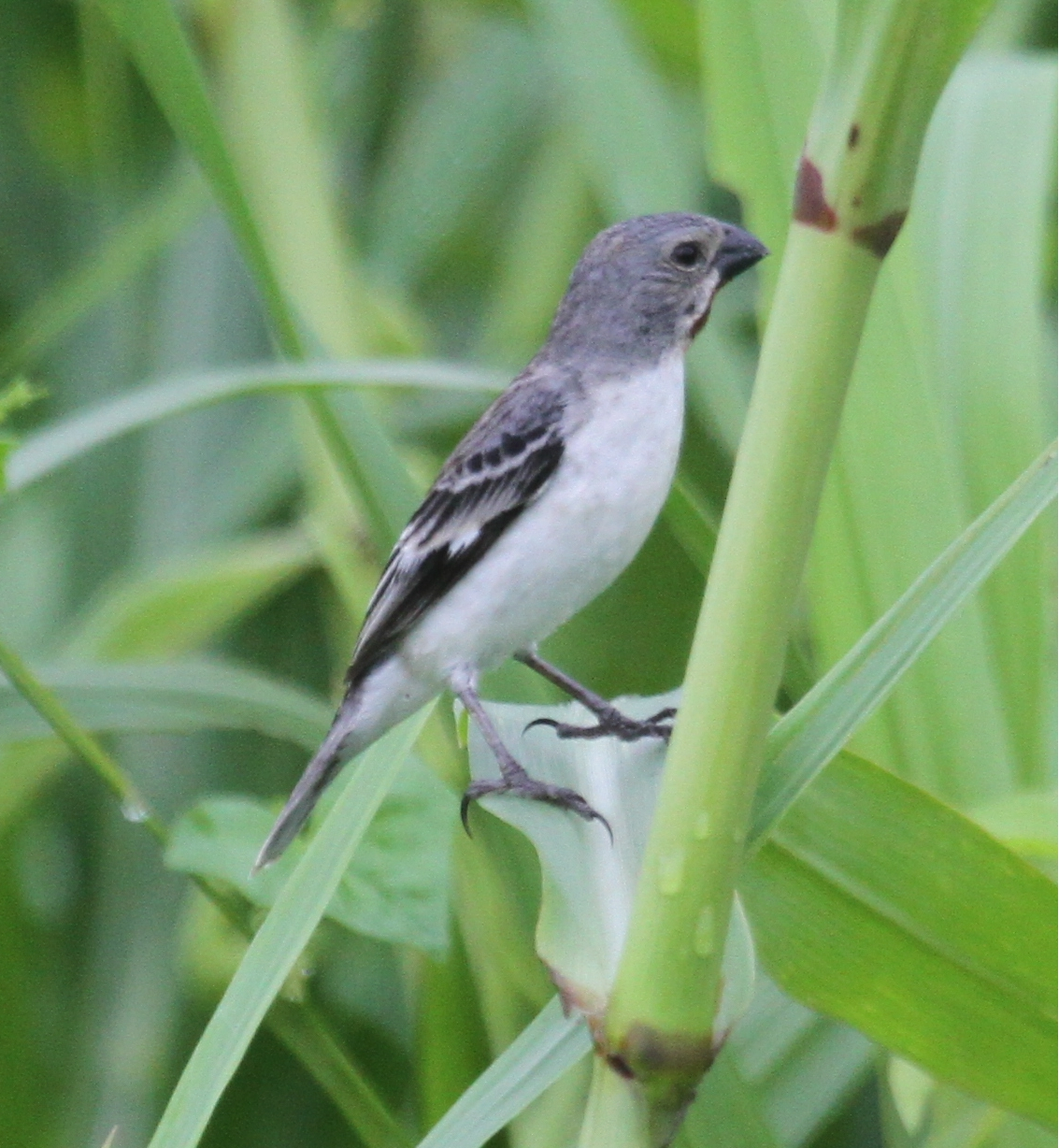

Conservation status
- Least Concern (IUCN 3.1)

Scientific classification
- Kingdom: Animalia
- Phylum: Chordata
- Class: Aves
- Order: Passeriformes
- Family: Thraupidae
- Genus: Sporophila
- Species: S. telasco

Binomial name
- Sporophila telasco (Lesson, RP, 1828)

Synonyms
- See text

= Chestnut-throated seedeater =

Species of bird

The chestnut-throated seedeater (Sporophila telasco) is a Neotropical songbird in the family Thraupidae, the tanagers and allies. It is found in Chile, Colombia, Ecuador, and Peru.

== Taxonomy and systematics ==
The chestnut-throated seedeater has a somewhat complicated taxonomic history. It was formally described in 1828 with the binomial Pyrrhula telasco. For a time it bore the binomial Spermophila telasco but by 1938 had been reassigned to its present genus Sporophila. Sporophila was a genus in the family Emberizidae. Based on studies published between 1988 and 2011, beginning in 2012 Sporophila was moved to the tanager family Thraupidae.

What had been called the Tumaco seedeater (S. insulata) (Chapman, 1921) was later proven to be genetically indistinguishable from the chestnut-throated despite having more chestnut on its underparts. It was therefore merged into the chestnut-throated as a color morph.

The chestnut-throated seedeater is monotypic.

== Description ==
The chestnut-throated seedeater is 10 to 10.5 cm (3.9 to 4.1 in) long; two males weighed 8.4 and 10.9 g (0.30 and 0.38 oz). It has a short, thick bill with a rounded culmen. The species is sexually dimorphic. Adult males have a medium gray head with deep chestnut bases on the crown feathers that show as the feathers wear. Their upperparts are mostly grayish with a slightly browner hindneck and lower back and dusky streaks on the crown and mantle. Their rump is white and their uppertail coverts gray. Their tail is mostly blackish with grayish feather edges and a small amount of white on the feathers' bases. Their wings are blackish with grayish edges on the coverts and tertials that sometimes show as two faint wing bars. The wings have white bases on the primaries that show as a patch on the closed wing. Their throat and upper breast are dark chestnut with tiny white spots at the base of the bill and the rest of their underparts are whitish. "Tumaco" seedeaters have mostly chestnut underparts with a whitish belly center. Females have a warm brown head and upperparts with darker streaks on the crown, nape, and mantle. Their wings are blackish with warm brown edges on the coverts and tertials and the same white primary patch as males. Their tail is blackish with warm brown feather edges. Their throat is white with a buffy band on the breast that continues along the flanks. The rest of their underparts are whitish. Both sexes have a dark brown iris. Males have a black bill and black legs; females have dull pinkish bill and dusky legs.

== Distribution and habitat ==
The chestnut-throated seedeater is found in southwestern Colombia on Gorgona Island off Cauca Department and Tumaco Island off Nariño Department. Its range continues in the coastal lowlands for the lengths of Ecuador and Peru into far northern Chile's Arica y Parinacota Region. In Ecuador it reaches the Andean foothills in El Oro and Loja provinces and in Peru is also inland in the valley of the Marañón River. It inhabits grassy and shrubby landscapes including dry grasslands, agricultural areas, desert oases, and settled areas. In elevation in Ecuador it is mostly below 500 m (1,600 ft) but locally reaches 1,400 m (4,600 ft). It reaches 700 m (2,300 ft) in Peru.

== Behavior ==
=== Movement ===
The chestnut-throated seedeater is overall a year-round resident though some small local movements are suspected.

=== Feeding ===
The chestnut-throated seedeater feeds primarily on grass seeds. It usually feeds while clinging to stems but sometimes on the ground. Outside the breeding season it often forages in flocks that include other seed-eating species.

=== Breeding ===
In Ecuador and Peru the chestnut-throated seedeater breeds during the February to May rainy season. Its nest is a cup made from dried grass and is usually placed not far above the ground in a low bush. The clutch size, incubation period, time to fledging, and details of parental care are not known. The shiny cowbird (Molothrus bonariensis) is sometimes a brood parasite.

=== Vocalization ===
One description of the chestnut-throated seedeater's song is "a short staccato musical warbling, sometimes with a little sputter at the end". Another is "a rapid, jerky series of warbled, snappy, and squeaky phrases, some buzzy". Its calls are "a dull thck, a rich tchip, and a Carduelis-like dcher".

== Status ==
The IUCN has assessed the chestnut-throated seedeater as being of Least Concern. It has a large range; its population size is not known but is believed to be increasing. No immediate threats have been identified. It is considered common in Ecuador and fairly common in Peru. "Agriculture in desert areas is likely increasing the amount of suitable habitat for this species."
