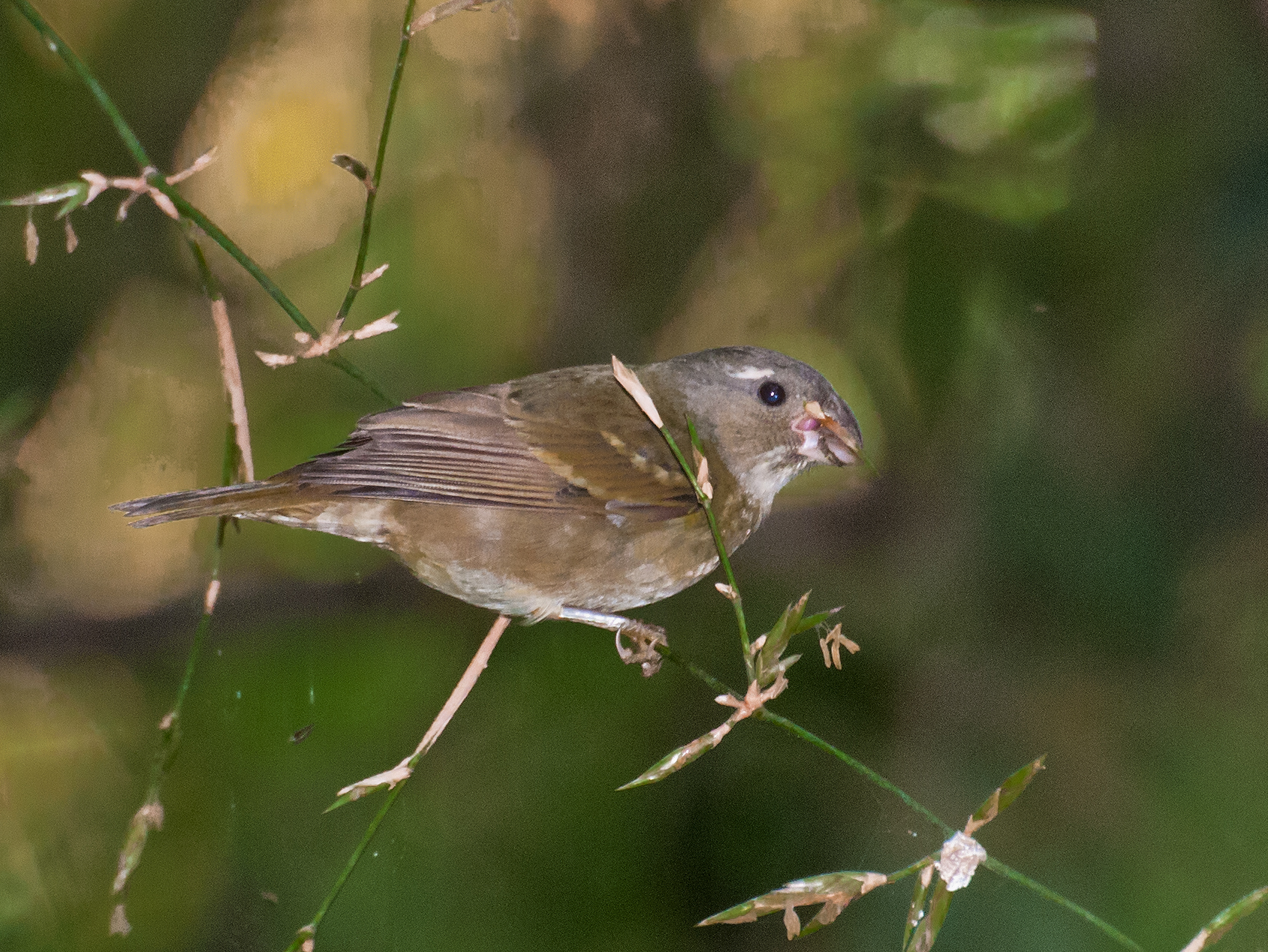
- In São Paulo, Brazil

Conservation status
- Vulnerable (IUCN 3.1)

Scientific classification
- Kingdom: Animalia
- Phylum: Chordata
- Class: Aves
- Order: Passeriformes
- Family: Thraupidae
- Genus: Sporophila
- Species: S. frontalis

Binomial name
- Sporophila frontalis (Verreaux, J, 1869)

= Buffy-fronted seedeater =

Species of bird

The buffy-fronted seedeater (Sporophila frontalis) is a Vulnerable species of bird in the family Thraupidae, the tanagers and allies. It is endemic to Brazil though there are unconfirmed reports from Argentina and Paraguay.

== Taxonomy and systematics ==
The buffy-fronted seedeater has a somewhat complicated taxonomic history. It was formally described in 1869 with the binomial Callirhynchus frontalis. By 1938 it had been reassigned to its present genus Sporophila, a genus in the family Emberizidae. Based on studies published between 1988 and 2011, beginning in 2012 Sporophila was moved to the tanager family Thraupidae.

The buffy-fronted seedeater is monotypic.

== Description ==
The buffy-fronted seedeater is about 12.5 cm (4.9 in) long and weighs 19.8 to 21 g (0.70 to 0.74 oz). It is the largest member of genus Sporophila and has a short bill with a deep base and a strongly curved culmen. Adult males have a mostly grayish head with a creamy "eyebrow" behind the eye, a white arc below the ear coverts, and sometimes creamy patches above the lores that do not meet on the forehead (the "front"). Their upperparts and tail are olive. Their wings are mostly olive with buffish tips on the median and greater coverts and buffish bases on the outer primaries. The former show as two wing bars and the latter as a "handkerchief" on the folded wing. Their throat is white with an olive band below it across the breast and continuing along the flanks. The rest of their underparts are mostly whitish with buffy undertail coverts. Females have an olive head without the male's white and creamy areas. Their upperparts and tail are olive and their wings olive with buffy olive wing bars. Their throat and underparts are pale olive. Both sexes have a dark iris and dusky pinkish to blackish legs. Males have an orange to dull horn bill with sometimes a duskier culmen; female's bills are similar but darker.

== Distribution and habitat ==
The buffy-fronted seedeater is found along the southeastern Brazilian coastal area mostly from Espirito Santo and eastern Minas Gerais south to northern Rio Grande do Sul. There are a number of records to the north in Bahia and scattered records to the west of the main range. Though some sources also place the species in Argentina and Paraguay the South American Classification Committee has only unconfirmed records from those countries. It is a species of the Atlantic Forest. It inhabits humid forest, nearby secondary forest, and the edges and clearings of denser forest. It is almost entirely found in areas with Guadua and Chusquea bamboo. In elevation it ranges up to 1,500 m (4,900 ft).

== Behavior ==
=== Movement ===
Though the buffy-fronted seedeater is not migratory, it is nomadic, wandering to find areas with seeding bamboo and disappearing when the seeding event is over.

=== Feeding ===
The buffy-fronted seedeater feeds primarily on the seeds of grasses. It appears to prefer those of Guadua bamboo but readily feeds on Chusquea and Merostachys seeds as well. In the absence of bamboo seeds it takes some insects. It typically forages in large flocks, taking the seeds while clinging to vegetation rather than on the ground.

=== Breeding ===
The buffy-fronted seedeater's breeding is timed to coincide with the seeding of bamboo and so is not confined to a particular calendar season. Nothing else is known about its breeding biology.

=== Vocalization ===
One description of the male buffy-fronted seedeater's song is a "loud, fast, staccato tje-te-tetrrít. Another is an "explosive and far-carrying, unmusical and grating, jeje jet or cheh-cheh-chew". A different song "starts with a short burst and ends with a thin high-pitched note, tchp-chiita-tziiip". The species' call is "a sharp tchew!, repeated at intervals".

== Status ==
The IUCN originally in 1988 assessed the buffy-fronted seedeater as Threatened, then in 1994 as Endangered, and since 2000 as Vulnerable. It has a limited range and its estimated population of between 2500 and 10,000 mature individuals is believed to be decreasing. "Rapid and continuing forest clearance has extended the intervals between major bamboo flowerings and nestings, and its nomadic habits suggest that existing reserves may afford inadequate protection. Persecution for the pet trade is severe, with lots of 100-200 birds recorded on sale at certain times in Rio de Janeiro." It is considered "uncommon to rare" in Brazil.
