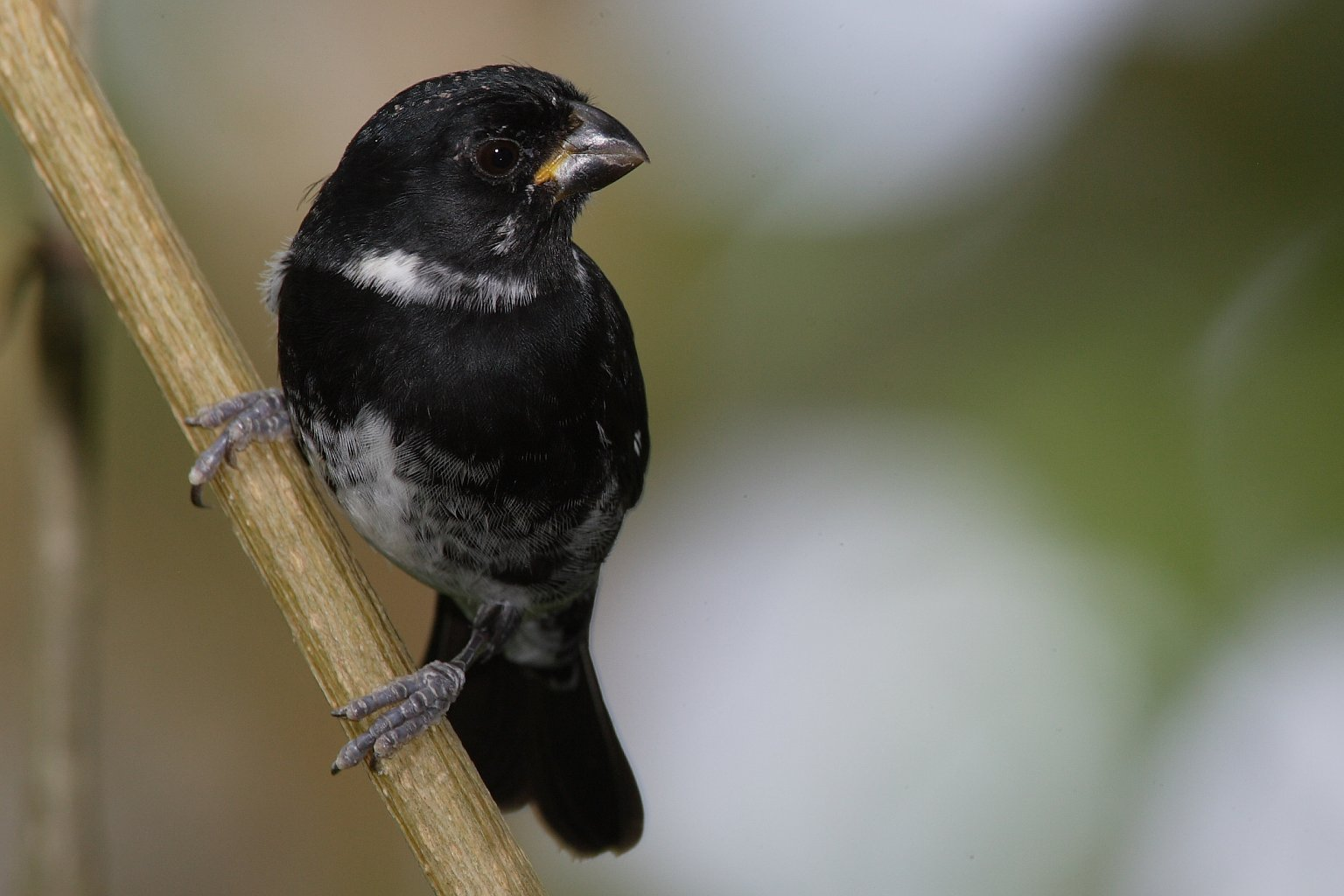
- Male variable seedeater
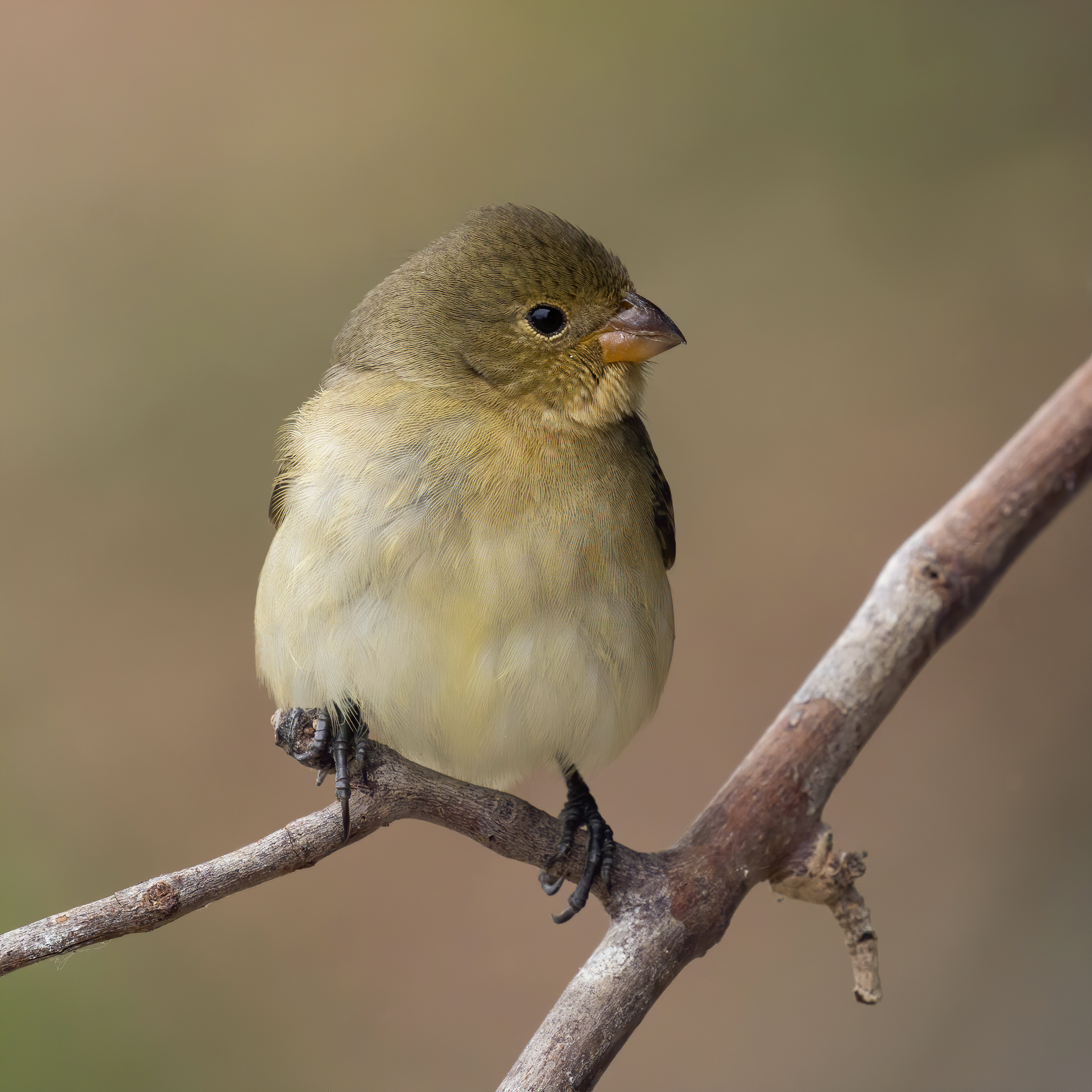
- Female

Scientific classification
- Kingdom: Animalia
- Phylum: Chordata
- Class: Aves
- Order: Passeriformes
- Family: Thraupidae
- Genus: Sporophila; Cabanis, 1844

Type species
- Pyrrhula falcirostris Temminck, 1820

= Sporophila =

Genus of birds

Sporophila is a genus of Neotropical birds in the tanager family Thraupidae. The genus now includes the six seed finches that were previously placed in the genus Oryzoborus.

They are relatively small with stubby, conical bills adapted for feeding on seeds and alike. Most species are strongly sexually dimorphic, and while "typical" adult males often are distinctive, female and immatures of both sexes can be very difficult (in some species virtually impossible) to identify to exact species. Females of at least some of these species have different ultraviolet colours, which can be seen by birds, but not humans. Female-like (paedomorphic) males apparently also occur, at least in some species.

The genus Spermophila was introduced by the English naturalist William Swainson in 1827. The type species was subsequently designated as Temminck's seedeater (Sporophila falcirostris) by George Robert Gray in 1841. As the genus name Spermophila had been introduced by John Richardson in 1825 for a genus of mammals, the German ornithologist Jean Cabanis coined the present name Sporophila as a replacement in 1844. The name combines the Ancient Greek sporos meaning "seed" and philos meaning "-loving".

The genus now includes the six seed finches that were previously placed in Oryzoborus as well as the thick-billed seed finch that was the only species in Dolospingus. A molecular phylogenetic study published in 2014 found that these seven species were embedded in Sporophila.

The genus contains the following 41 species:

| Image | Common name | Scientific name | Distribution |
|---|---|---|---|
| | Lesson's seedeater | Sporophila bouvronides | Bolivia, Brazil, Colombia, Ecuador, French Guiana, Guyana, Panama, Peru, Suriname, Trinidad and Tobago, and Venezuela. |
| | Lined seedeater | Sporophila lineola | Argentina, Bolivia, Brazil, Colombia, Ecuador, French Guiana, Guyana, Panama, Paraguay, Peru, Suriname, and Venezuela. |
| | Cinnamon-rumped seedeater | Sporophila torqueola | western Mexico |
| | Morelet’s seedeater | Sporophila morelleti | Rio Grande Valley through eastern Mexico and Central America to western Panama |
| | Variable seedeater | Sporophila corvina | southern Mexico through Central America to the Chocó of northwestern South America |
| | Grey seedeater | Sporophila intermedia | Brazil, Colombia, Ecuador, Guyana, Trinidad and Tobago, and Venezuela. |
| | Wing-barred seedeater | Sporophila americana | north-eastern Venezuela, Tobago, the Guianas, Brazil |
| | White-naped seedeater | Sporophila fringilloides | Brazil, Colombia, and Venezuela. |
| | Black-and-white seedeater | Sporophila luctuosa | Bolivia, Brazil, Colombia, Ecuador, Peru, and Venezuela. |
| | Double-collared seedeater | Sporophila caerulescens | Argentina, Bolivia, Brazil, Paraguay, Peru, and Uruguay |
| | Yellow-bellied seedeater | Sporophila nigricollis | Costa Rica to Bolivia |
| | Dubois's seedeater | Sporophila ardesiaca | east-central Brazil |
| | Thick-billed seed finch | Sporophila funerea | southern Mexico, through Central America, to the Chocó in Colombia and Ecuador. |
| | Chestnut-bellied seed finch | Sporophila angolensis | Trinidad, Tobago, east Colombia, Venezuela, the Guianas, Bolivia to east Brazil, Paraguay and northeast Argentina |
| | Nicaraguan seed finch | Sporophila nuttingi | Costa Rica, Nicaragua and northwestern Panama. |
| | Great-billed seed finch | Sporophila maximiliani | Brazil |
| | Large-billed seed finch | Sporophila crassirostris | Brazil, Colombia, Ecuador, French Guiana, Guyana, Peru, Suriname, Trinidad and Tobago, and Venezuela. |
| | Black-billed seed finch | Sporophila atrirostris | Ecuador, Peru and northwestern Bolivia |
| | Slate-coloured seedeater | Sporophila schistacea | Central America, the southwestern Amazon Basin, Colombia, Venezuela, Trinidad and Tobago and the Guianas. |
| | Temminck's seedeater | Sporophila falcirostris | Argentina and southeastern Brazil |
| | Buffy-fronted seedeater | Sporophila frontalis | northeastern Argentina and along the southeastern Brazil |
| | Plumbeous seedeater | Sporophila plumbea | Argentina, Bolivia, Brazil, Colombia, French Guiana, Guyana, Paraguay, Peru, Suriname, and Venezuela. |
| | Tropeiro seedeater | Sporophila beltoni | Brazil |
| | Rusty-collared seedeater | Sporophila collaris | Argentina, Bolivia, Brazil, Paraguay, and Uruguay. |
| | White-throated seedeater | Sporophila albogularis | Brazil. |
| | White-bellied seedeater | Sporophila leucoptera | Bolivia, Paraguay and eastern Brazil |
| | Parrot-billed seedeater | Sporophila peruviana | Ecuador and western Peru. |
| | Chestnut-throated seedeater | Sporophila telasco | southwestern Colombia to far northern Chile. |
| | Drab seedeater | Sporophila simplex | Ecuador and Peru. |
| | Chestnut-bellied seedeater | Sporophila castaneiventris | Bolivia, Brazil, Colombia, Ecuador, French Guiana, Guyana, Peru, Suriname, and Venezuela |
| | Ruddy-breasted seedeater | Sporophila minuta | Brazil, Colombia, Costa Rica, Ecuador, El Salvador, French Guiana, Guatemala, Guyana, Honduras, Mexico, Nicaragua, Panama, Suriname, Trinidad and Tobago, and Venezuela. |
| | Copper seedeater | Sporophila bouvreuil | Brazil and Suriname. |
| | Black-and-tawny seedeater | Sporophila nigrorufa | eastern Bolivia and southwestern Brazil. |
| | Tawny-bellied seedeater | Sporophila hypoxantha | Argentina, Bolivia, Brazil, Paraguay, and Uruguay. |
| | Dark-throated seedeater | Sporophila ruficollis | Argentina, Bolivia, Brazil, Paraguay, and Uruguay |
| | Pearly-bellied seedeater | Sporophila pileata | Brazil, Paraguay, northern Uruguay and northeastern Argentina. |
| | Rufous-rumped seedeater | Sporophila hypochroma | Bolivia, Brazil, Paraguay, Argentina, and Uruguay |
| | Chestnut seedeater | Sporophila cinnamomea | Argentina, Brazil, Paraguay, and Uruguay |
| | Marsh seedeater | Sporophila palustris | Argentina, Brazil, Paraguay, and Uruguay. |
| | Black-bellied seedeater | Sporophila melanogaster | Brazil. |
| | Ibera seedeater | Sporophila iberaensis | Argentina. |

Possible extinct species:

- Hooded seedeater, Sporophila melanops – possibly extinct (20th century?), a hybrid or a color morph of S. nigricollis
