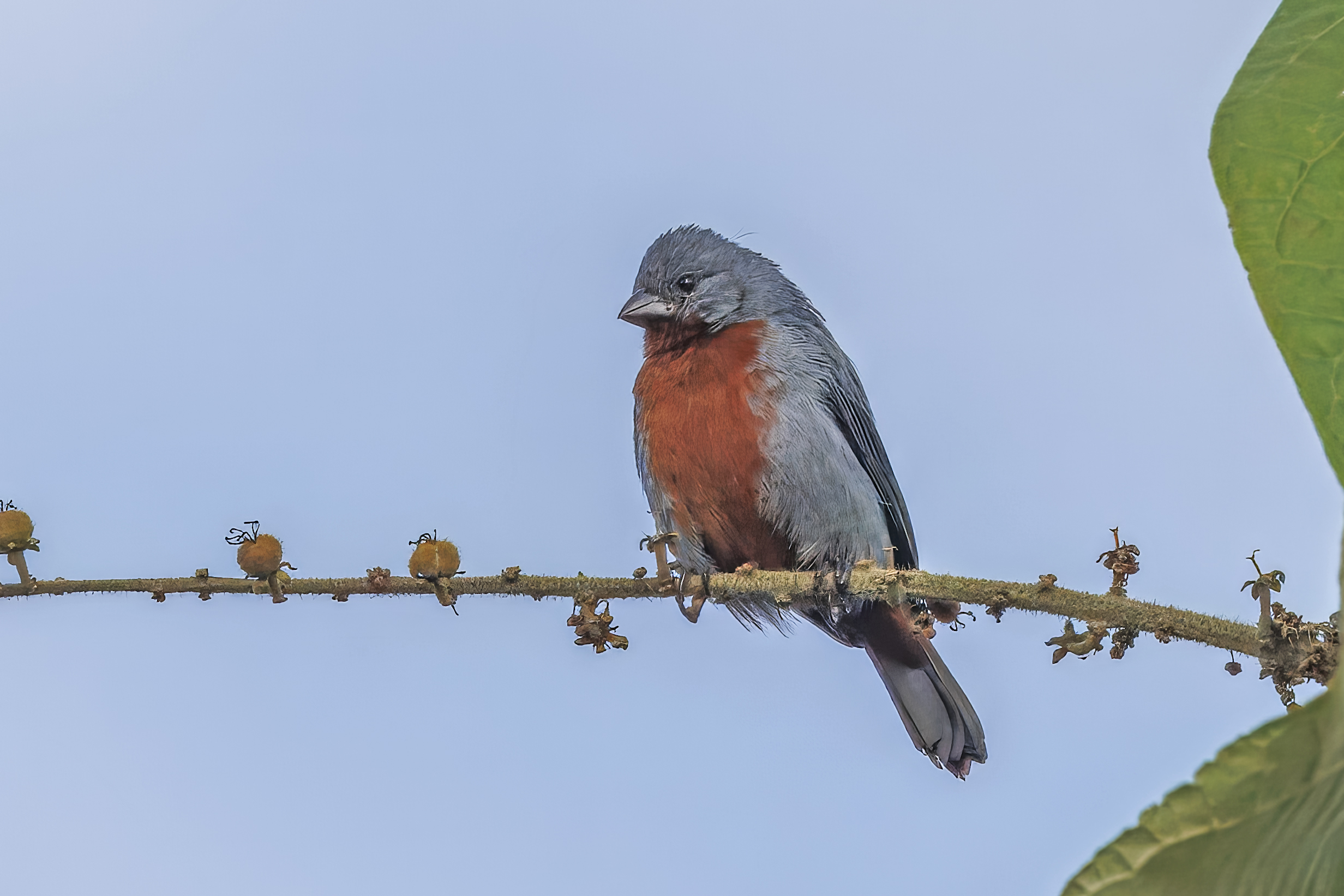
- Male, Ecuador

Conservation status
- Least Concern (IUCN 3.1)

Scientific classification
- Kingdom: Animalia
- Phylum: Chordata
- Class: Aves
- Order: Passeriformes
- Family: Thraupidae
- Genus: Sporophila
- Species: S. castaneiventris

Binomial name
- Sporophila castaneiventris Cabanis, 1849

= Chestnut-bellied seedeater =

Species of bird

The chestnut-bellied seedeater (Sporophila castaneiventris) is a species of bird in the family Thraupidae, the tanagers and allies. It is found in every mainland South American country except Argentina, Chile, Paraguay, and Uruguay.

== Taxonomy and systematics ==
The chestnut-bellied seedeater was formally described in 1849 with its present binomial Sporophila castaneiventris. At the time genus Sporophila was in the family Fringillidae. Sporophila was later in the family Emberizidae. Based on studies published between 1988 and 2011, beginning in 2012 Sporophila was moved to the tanager family Thraupidae.

The chestnut-bellied seedeater is monotypic.

== Description ==
The chestnut-bellied seedeater is about 10 cm (3.9 in) long and weighs an average of 7.8 g (0.28 oz). It has a short, thick bill with a rounded culmen. The species is sexually dimorphic. Adult males have a blue-gray head and upperparts with sometimes a tiny white spot behind the bill. Their tail is mostly blackish with gray edges at the base of the outer feathers. Their wings are blackish with grayish edges on most feathers. Their throat and breast are widely chestnut that narrows through the belly between blue-gray flanks and again widens on the vent and undertail coverts. Females have a buff face on an otherwise warm sandy brown head. Their upperparts are also warm sandy brown. Their wings are a darker brown with sandy brown edges on the coverts. Their tail is also a darker brown. Their throat and underparts are warm buff that is palest on the belly. Both sexes have a dark brown iris. Males have a black bill and black legs; females have dark horn to blackish bill and blackish legs.

== Distribution and habitat ==
The chestnut-bellied seedeater is found from extreme southwestern Amazonas state in southern Venezuela south and west through the southeastern third of Colombia and eastern Ecuador and Peru into northern Bolivia. From Colombia, Peru, and Bolivia its range continues through Brazil to the Atlantic in Amapá. Its northern limit in Brazil roughly follows a line from where northern Amazonas meets Venezuela south to the Amazon River in central Amazonas and then northeast to Amapá. Its southern boundary is from western Rondônia at northeastern Bolivia northeast to the Atlantic. From Amapá its range continues west across northern French Guiana, Suriname, and Guyana almost to Venezuela.

The chestnut-bellied seedeater inhabits grassy and shrubby landscapes including clearings in forest, agricultural areas, lawns and parks in settled areas, and even floating vegetation in lakes and marshes. In elevation it reaches about 200 m (700 ft) in Venezuela, 500 m (1,600 ft) in Colombia, 1,300 m (4,300 ft) in Ecuador, 1,400 m (4,600 ft) in Peru, and 500 m (1,600 ft) in Brazil.

== Behavior ==
=== Movement ===
There is little information on the chestnut-bellied seedeater's movements. It is suspected to be a partial migrant.

=== Feeding ===
The chestnut-bellied seedeater feeds primarily on grass seeds but also includes fruits and Müllerian bodies of Cecropia trees in its diet. It feeds mostly while clinging to grass stems but will feed on the ground when stems are lying down. It often forages in small flocks.

=== Breeding ===
Nothing is known about the chestnut-bellied seedeater's breeding biology.

=== Vocalization ===
The chestnut-bellied seedeater's song is a "rapid, rather long, varied series, starting with very high, clear warbling, then slightly descending to more nasal twittering". Its calls are "a descending cheeoo whistle or a shorter tsiep".

== Status ==
The IUCN has assessed the chestnut-bellied seedeater as being of Least Concern. It has an extremely large range; its population size is not known but is believed to be stable. Though no immediate threats have been identified, the species "has been reported as used in trade at a high prevalence, being found in three of the seven trade datasets evaluated". It is known in Venezuela from only a few records. It is considered common in Colombia and Ecuador, "a familiar sight" in Peru, and "common to frequent" in Brazil.
