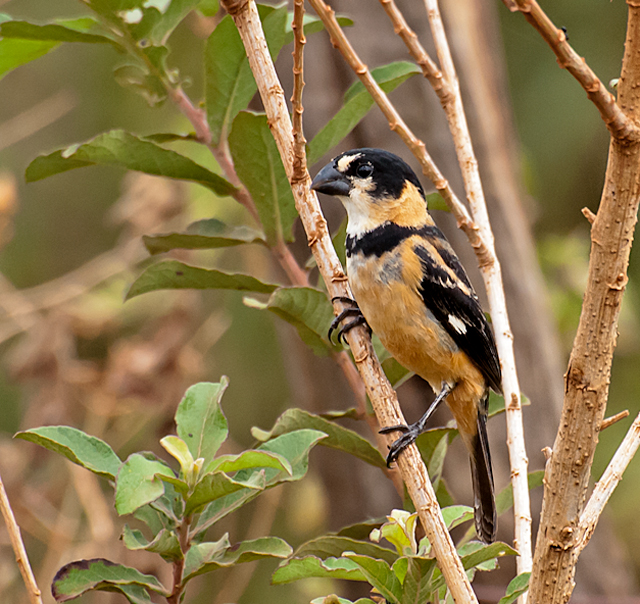
- Male in São Paulo, Brazil
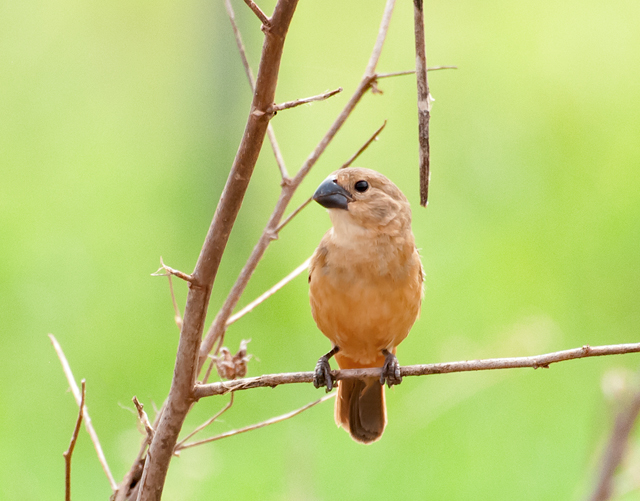
- Female in São Paulo, Brazil

Conservation status
- Least Concern (IUCN 3.1)

Scientific classification
- Kingdom: Animalia
- Phylum: Chordata
- Class: Aves
- Order: Passeriformes
- Family: Thraupidae
- Genus: Sporophila
- Species: S. collaris

Binomial name
- Sporophila collaris (Boddaert, 1783)

= Rusty-collared seedeater =

Species of bird

The rusty-collared seedeater (Sporophila collaris) is a species of bird in the family Thraupidae, the tanagers and allies. It is found in Argentina, Bolivia, Brazil, Paraguay, and Uruguay.

== Taxonomy and systematics ==
The rusty-collared seedeater has a complicated taxonomic history. It was included by the French polymath Georges-Louis Leclerc, Comte de Buffon in 1775 in his Histoire Naturelle des Oiseaux. The bird was also illustrated in a hand-colored plate engraved by François-Nicolas Martinet in the Planches Enluminées D'Histoire Naturelle which was produced under the supervision of Edme-Louis Daubenton to accompany Buffon's text. Neither the plate caption nor Buffon's description included a scientific name but in 1783 the Dutch naturalist Pieter Boddaert coined the binomial name Loxia collaris in his catalogue of the Planches Enluminées. Buffon mistakenly believed that his specimen had come from Angola. In 1904 the Austrian ornithologist Carl Eduard Hellmayr designated the type location as Rio de Janeiro in Brazil. Hellmayr also reassigned the species to the genus Sporophila. At the time the genus Sporophila wase in the family Emberizidae. Based on studies published between 1988 and 2011, beginning in 2012 Sporophila was moved to the tanager family Thraupidae.

The genus name combines the Ancient Greek sporos meaning "seed" and philos meaning "-loving". The specific epithet collaris is Latin for "of the neck".

The rusty-collared seedeater has these three subspecies:

- S. c. ochrascen Hellmayr, 1904
- S. c. collaris (Boddaert, 1783)
- S. c. melanocephala (Vieillot, 1817)

== Description ==
The rusty-collared seedeater is about 12 cm (4.7 in) long and weighs 7.5 to 14 g (0.26 to 0.49 oz). It has a longish tail and thick bill with a rounded culmen. The species is sexually dimorphic. Adult males of the nominate subspecies S. c. collaris have a mostly black head with a white spot above the lores, a white arc below the eye, and a white throat whose color extends rearward as a partial collar most of the way around the neck. Their mantle and upper back are blackish gray, their scapulars blackish gray with wide paler edges, and their lower back and rump pale buff. Their tail is black. Their wings are black with white edges on the coverts that show as two wing bars and white bases on the primaries that show as a large patch on the closed wing. They have a narrow black band below the throat and the rest of their underparts are pale buffish. Females have a similar pattern to males but are much duller overall. They have a warm brown head with the same white arc under the eye as males and a whitish throat without a black band below it. Their upperparts, wings, and tail are warm brown; the wings have buffy wing bars and a smaller white primary patch than males. Their underparts are tawny-buff. Subspecies S. c. melanocephala is brighter overall than the nominate. The male's collar is cinnamon-tawny, its rump tawny, its wing bars cinnamon, and its underparts a richer buff than the nominate's. S. c. ochrascen has olive-gray to brownish upperparts, a lighter rust-yellow collar, and mostly rust-yellow underparts with a cream lower breast. Both sexes of all subspecies have a dark brown iris, a black bill, and black legs.

== Distribution and habitat ==
The rusty-collared seedeater's subspecies are found thus:

- S. c. ochrascen: northern and eastern Bolivia from La Paz Department east into Brazil, there from northern Mato Grosso south to western São Paulo state.
- S. c. collaris: eastern Brazil from extreme southeastern Pará south through far western Tocantins, Goiás, Minas Gerais, and far southeastern Bahia to Rio de Janeiro state
- S. c. melanocephala: from southwestern Mato Grosso south in Brazil to Paraná and south through Paraguay into Argentina to central Buenos Aires Province and from there east across Uruguay and southern Rio Grande do Sul in Brazil.

The rusty-collared seedeater inhabits wet grasslands and shrubby marshes and also drier landscapes by rivers and lakes. It favors marshes that have tall vegetation and greatly favors the large sedge Cyperus giganteus. In elevation it ranges from sea level to 500 m (1,600 ft).

== Behavior ==
=== Movement ===
The rusty-collared seedeater is generally a year-round resident, but is known to make some local movements.

=== Feeding ===
The rusty-collared seedeater feeds primarily on grass seeds but also includes insects in its diet. It feeds while perched in the vegetation and only rarely on the ground. It usually forages in pairs or small groups.

=== Breeding ===
The rusty-collared seedeater's breeding season has not been fully defined, but spans November to April in Argentina and at least November to March in far southern Brazil. The female builds the cup nest from plant fibers and dry leaves. It is usually in a shrub, about 1.5 to 2 m (5 to 7 ft) up, and often over water. The clutch is two or three eggs that are greenish blue or whitish green with dark markings. The female alone incubates, for 12 to 13 days, and fledging occurs nine to 12 days after hatch. Both parents provision nestlings.

=== Vocalization ===
The rusty-collared seedeater's song is "a rapid warble that ascends and descends, mixed with twittering sounds and often incorporating imitations of other species". It has been likened to canary song. The species' call is "a nasal ghep or sharper tchep".

== Status ==
The IUCN has assessed the rusty-collared seedeater as being of Least Concern. It has a very large range; its population size is not known but is believed to be stable. No immediate threats have been identified. It is considered "frequent to uncommon" in Brazil. It is captured for the cage bird trade.
