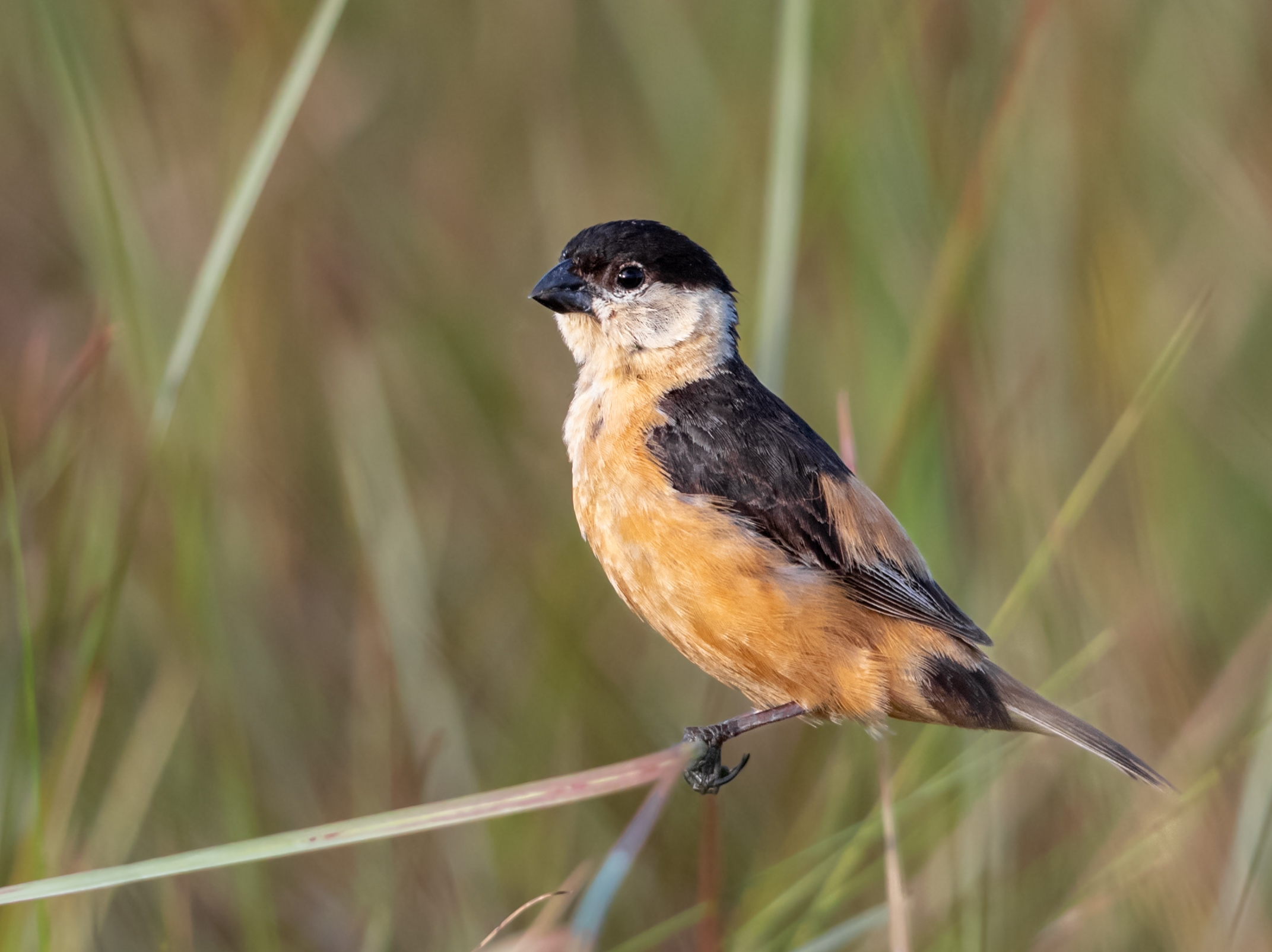

Conservation status
- Vulnerable (IUCN 3.1)

Scientific classification
- Kingdom: Animalia
- Phylum: Chordata
- Class: Aves
- Order: Passeriformes
- Family: Thraupidae
- Genus: Sporophila
- Species: S. nigrorufa

Binomial name
- Sporophila nigrorufa (D'Orbigny & Lafresnaye, 1837)

= Black-and-tawny seedeater =

Species of bird

The black-and-tawny seedeater (Sporophila nigrorufa) is a Vulnerable species of bird in the family Thraupidae, the tanagers and allies. It is found in Bolivia and Brazil.

== Taxonomy and systematics ==
The black-and-tawny seedeater has a somewhat complicated taxonomic history. It was formally described in 1837 with the binomial Pyrrhula nigro-rufa. By 1938 it had been assigned to the genus Sporophila as S. nigro-rufa. The genus was then in the family Fringillidae. By 1970 it had attained its current spelling of S. nigrorufa, and the genus had been reassigned to the family Emberizidae. Based on studies published between 1988 and 2011, beginning in 2012 Sporophila was moved to the tanager family Thraupidae.

The black-and-tawny seedeater is monotypic.

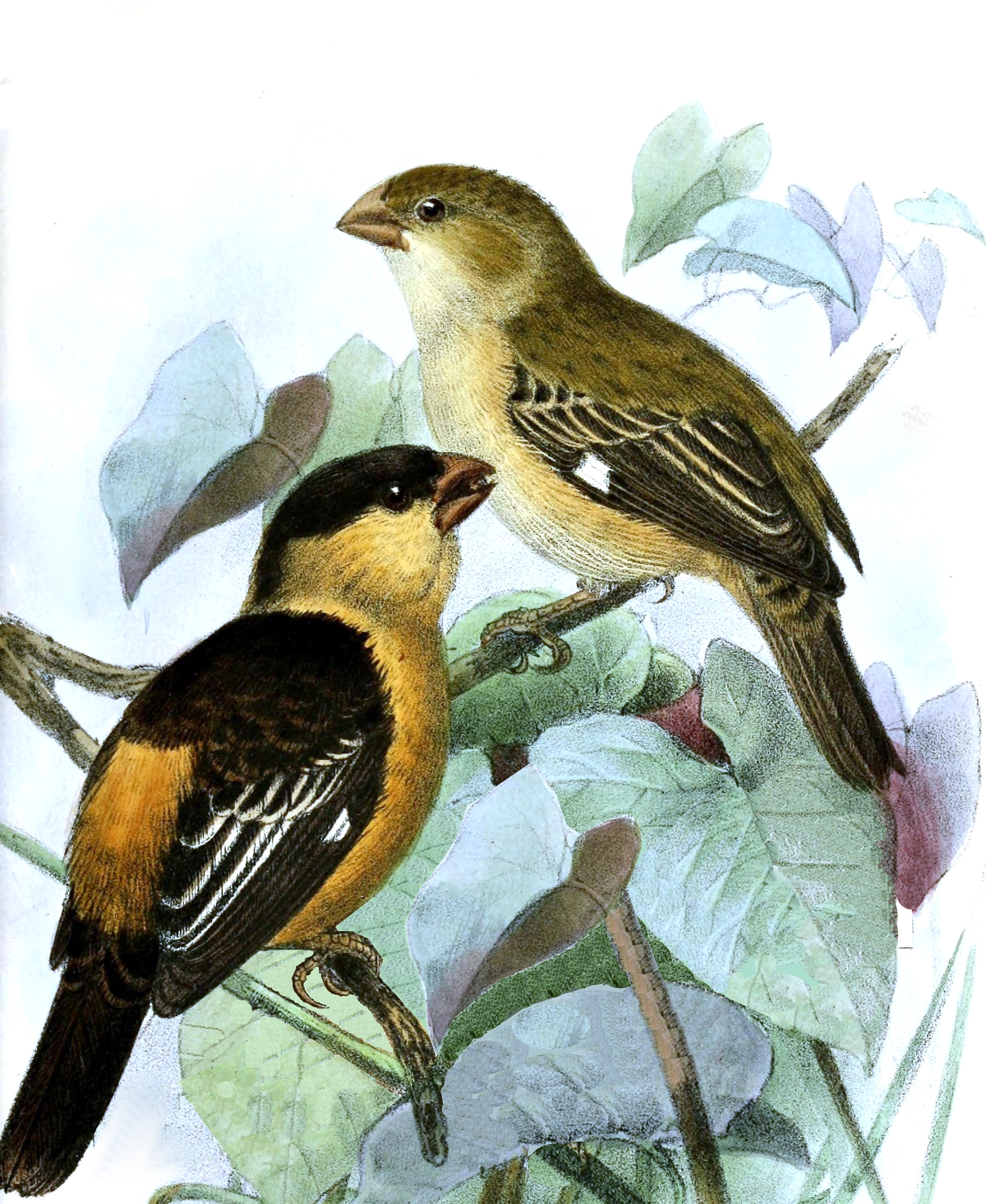
Illustration by John Gerrard Keulemans, 1871

== Description ==
The black-and-tawny seedeater is about 10 cm (3.9 in) long. It is one of the smallest of its genus. It has a short, thick bill with a rounded culmen. The species is sexually dimorphic. Adult males have a black cap down to just past the eye. Their face and nape are tawny-cinnamon except for a thin black line down the center of the nape. Their upper back is black and their lower back and rump are dark tawny. Their tail is black. Their wings are black with white edges on the greater coverts and tertials. Their wing's primaries have white bases that show as a very small patch on the folded wing. Their throat and underparts are cinnamon-tawny. Females have an olive-brown head and upperparts. Their wings and tail are dusky olive with paler feather edges. Their throat is pale yellowish, their breast olive-tinged yellowish, and the rest of their underparts off-white to pale cinnamon. Both sexes have a dark brown iris. Males have a blackish bill and black legs; females have a horn-colored bill and dusky legs.

== Distribution and habitat ==
The black-and-tawny seedeater is found from eastern Bolivia's Santa Cruz and Beni departments east into southwestern Brazil's Mato Grosso and far northern Mato Grosso do Sul states. It inhabits grassy landscapes including Cerrado, tall grasslands near water, and savanna at elevations up to 500 m (1,600 ft).

== Behavior ==
=== Movement ===
The black-and-tawny seedeater appears to be migratory, though details of its movements are lacking. It is present in Bolivia from October to December and absent during July to October. It is assumed to migrate east into Brazil for the austral winter.

=== Feeding ===
The black-and-tawny seedeater feeds on grass seeds. It typically feeds while clinging to stems up to about 1.5 m (5 ft) above the ground. In what is thought to be its non-breeding season it often gathers in flocks that can exceed 100 individuals.

=== Breeding ===
Beyond its apparent migratory behavior, nothing is known about the black-and-tawny seedeater's breeding biology.

=== Vocalization ===
The black-and-tawny seedeater's song is "a pleasant series of whistles...delivered at [a] slow and leisurely pace, cheeooo cheeooo, tp-twee, tp-cheeo, tp-twee, tpweeo, tp-twee, chp-weeo, tp-twee ...". Its calls include a "nasal phhht, sharper puut and rising cheeé".

== Status ==
The IUCN originally in 1988 assessed the black-and-tawny seedeater as being of Least Concern, in 1994 as Endangered, and since 2000 as Vulnerable. It has a limited range and its estimated population of between 2500 and 10,000 mature individuals is believed to be decreasing. "The effects of extensive and continuing conversion of grassland habitats to agriculture are intensified by its possibly nomadic and/or migratory behaviour...Breeding sites are presumably affected by cattle-grazing and trampling. Trapping for the cagebird trade may be an additional threat." It is a very poorly known species and is considered rare and local. It does occur in at least one national park in each country.
