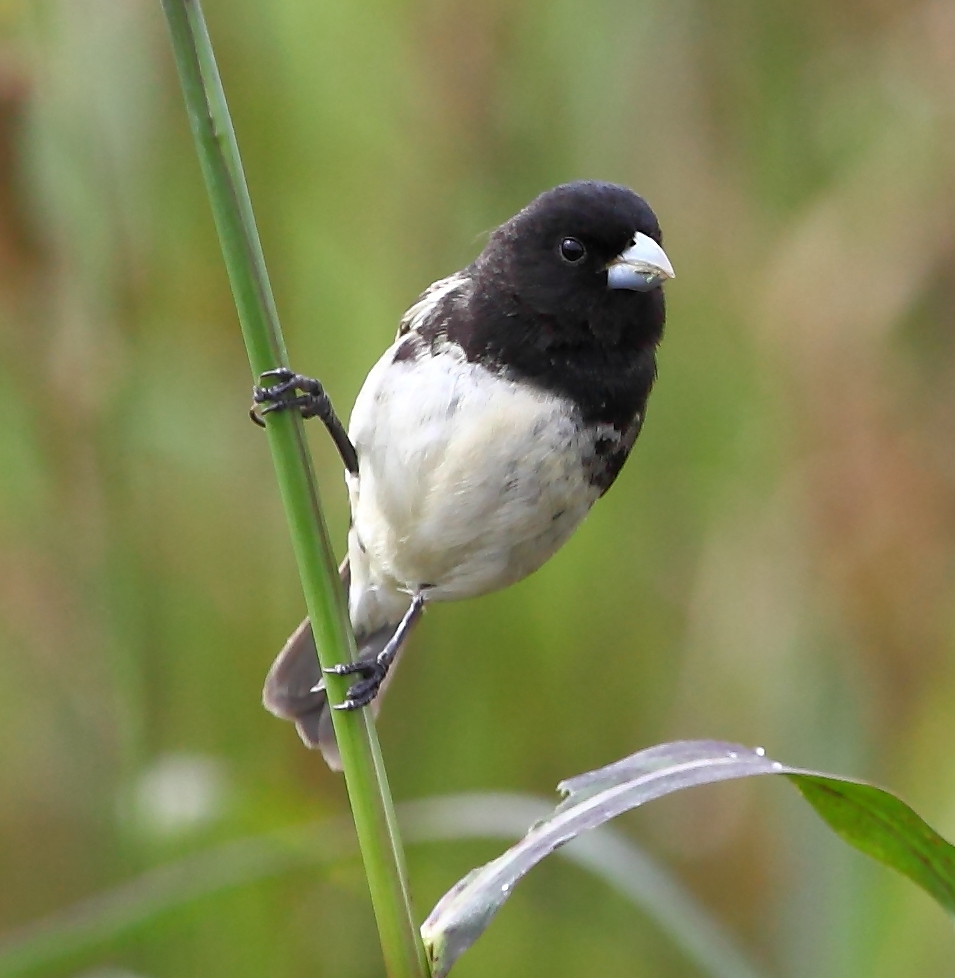
- male at Sacramento, Minas Gerais state, Brazil

Conservation status
- Least Concern (IUCN 3.1)

Scientific classification
- Kingdom: Animalia
- Phylum: Chordata
- Class: Aves
- Order: Passeriformes
- Family: Thraupidae
- Genus: Sporophila
- Species: S. ardesiaca

Binomial name
- Sporophila ardesiaca (Dubois, 1894)

= Dubois's seedeater =

Species of bird

Dubois's seedeater (Sporophila ardesiaca) is a bird in the family Thraupidae, the tanagers and allies. It is endemic to Brazil.

== Taxonomy and systematics ==
DuBois's seedeater has a complicated taxonomic history. It was formally described in 1864 with the binomial Spermophila ardesiaca. In a 1938 publication Carl Eduard Hellmayr noted that it had been reassigned to its present genus Sporophila. However he tentatively listed it as "an artificial variety of S. nigricollis", the yellow-bellied seedeater. At the time Sporophila was a member of the family Fringillidae. By 1970 Sporophila had been reassigned to the family Emberizidae. Based on studies published between 1988 and 2011, beginning in 2012 the genus was moved to its present position in the tanager family Thraupidae.

The bird's status remains uncertain. Major taxonomic systems treat it as a full species with no subspecies. However, some authors continue to suggest it as a subspecies of S. nigricollis, others suggest it is a variant but not a full subspecies of S. nigricollis, and still others suggest it is a hybrid between S. nigricollis and the double-collared seedeater (S. caerulescens). The South American Classification Committee is seeking a proposal to settle the matter.

This article follows the full-species model.

== Description ==
DuBois's seedeater is about 11 cm (4.3 in) long. It has a short thick bill with a rounded culmen. The species is sexually dimorphic. Adult males have a black head and nape. Their upperparts are grayish with some faint but darker streaks on the back. Their wings are mostly brownish with wide gray edges on the coverts and tertials. Their tail is also brownish. Their throat and upper breast are black with a sharp demarcation from the white underparts; the latter often have dark blurry spots on the flanks. Adult females have a warm buffy brown head, nape, upperparts, wings, and tail. Their throat, breast, and flanks are warm buffy brown, their belly and vent paler buff, and their crissum a darker buff. Both sexes have a dark brown iris and blackish legs. Males have a blue-gray bill and females a dusky one.

== Distribution and habitat ==
DuBois's seedeater is found in southeastern Brazil in eastern Goias, southeastern Bahia, most of Minas Gerais, northern São Paulo state, Espirito Santo, and Rio de Janeiro state. It inhabits "shrubby and grassy places [and] roadsides" at elevations from sea level to 800 m (2,600 ft).

== Behavior ==
=== Movement ===
Some sources state that DuBois's seedeater is a non-migratory year-round resident. However, the map in van Perlo's field guide shows it as a resident in eastern Minas Gerais, Espirito Santo, and Rio de Janeiro state. It shows it present in the austral winter in the rest of its range.

=== Feeding ===
DuBois's seedeater feeds almost entirely on grass seeds. It plucks them while clinging to grass stems. It usually forages in small flocks that often include yellow-bellied seedeaters.

=== Breeding ===
Nothing is known about the breeding biology of DuBois's seedeater.

=== Vocalization ===
The song of DuBois's seedeater is almost identical to that of the local population of yellow-bellied seedeaters. It is "a loud and melodious warble with some doubled notes and an accented or different ending, tweew-tweew, chu-chu, tweeta-cheww-pheeeééé". Its call is "a high-pitched tiip.

== Status ==
The IUCN has assessed DuBois's seedeater as being of Least Concern. It has a restricted range; its population size is not known but is believed to be increasing. No immediate threats have been identified. It is considered "frequent to uncommon" in both its resident and winter ranges.
