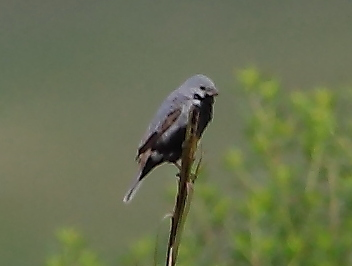

Conservation status
- Near Threatened (IUCN 3.1)

Scientific classification
- Kingdom: Animalia
- Phylum: Chordata
- Class: Aves
- Order: Passeriformes
- Family: Thraupidae
- Genus: Sporophila
- Species: S. melanogaster

Binomial name
- Sporophila melanogaster (Pelzeln, 1870)
- Breeding Non-Breeding

= Black-bellied seedeater =

Species of bird

The black-bellied seedeater (Sporophila melanogaster) is a Near Threatened species of bird in the family Thraupidae, the tanagers and allies.. It is endemic to Brazil but has been recorded as a vagrant to Argentina.

== Taxonomy and systematics ==
The black-bellied seedeater has a somewhat complicated taxonomic history. It was formally described in 1871 with the binomial Spermophila melanogaster. The genus was in the family Fringillidae. By 1938 it had been reclassified as Sporophila melanogaster, still in the family Fringillidae. By 1970 the genus Sporophila had been reassigned to the family Emberizidae. Based on studies published between 1988 and 2011, beginning in 2012 Sporophila was moved to the tanager family Thraupidae.

The black-bellied seedeater is monotypic.

== Description ==
The black-bellied seedeater is 10 to 10.6 cm (3.9 to 4.2 in) long and weighs 8 to 10.5 g (0.28 to 0.37 oz). It is one of the smallest of its genus. It has a smallish bill with a rounded culmen. The species is sexually dimorphic. Adult males have a mostly bluish gray head and neck with a black throat. Their upperparts are bluish gray and their tail blackish gray. Their wings are blackish gray with white bases on the primaries that show as a patch on the folded wing. Their sides are bluish gray and the rest of their underparts black. Females have an olive-brown head and back. Their tail and wings are a darker olive-brown with the same white primary patch as males. Their underparts are a buffier brown. Both sexes have a brown iris and dark legs. Males have a black or dark gray bill; females have a brownish gray bill with a pale yellowish mandible. Juveniles resemble adult females.

== Distribution and habitat ==
The black-bellied seedeater is found in southeastern Brazil. It ranges from northeastern Rio Grande do Sul north to eastern Mato Grosso do Sul, the southern half of Goías, and the western half of Minas Gerais. It inhabits tall moist grasslands, including marshes, and scrubby areas. In elevation it ranges from near sea level to 1,100 m (3,600 ft).

The South American Classification Committee has records of the species as a vagrant in Argentina.

== Behavior ==
=== Movement ===
The black-bellied seedeater breeds at the southern end of its range in Rio Grande do Sul, Santa Catarina, and extreme southeastern Paraná. Its non-breeding range is to the north of there but remains incompletely defined. Its migration timing is associated with the seeding of grasses.

=== Feeding ===
The black-bellied seedeater feeds on grass seeds, especially those of native grasses but also those of exotics, and also includes some small arthropods in its diet. It typically feeds while clinging to stems, sometimes upside down as the stem bends. In the breeding season it forages in pairs or family groups and outside it in larger groups that include other seed-eating species.

=== Breeding ===
The black-bellied seedeater breeds between early November and late March with peak activity from late November to early January. The nest is a cup made from plant fibers and much spider web. The average clutch is two eggs though one and three are known. The incubation period is not known; fledging occurs about nine days after hatch. Both parents provision nestlings.

=== Vocalization ===
The black-bellied seedeater's song is a "very high twittering, interspersed with see-u calls".

== Status ==
The IUCN has assessed the black-bellied seedeater as Near Threatened. Its estimated population of between 2500 and 10,000 mature individuals is believed to be decreasing. "The main threats to the species are illegal capture as a cagebird and habitat loss due to conversion to agriculture (for crops, including soybeans and Pinus spp., and grazing pasture)...Invasive grasses are degrading the habitat and pesticides may be detrimental. Habitat is being lost both within the breeding areas and along the migration route." The species is considered "frequent to uncommon" in its breeding range and "uncommon to rare" in its larger non-breeding range. It is found in a few protected areas within its breeding range.
