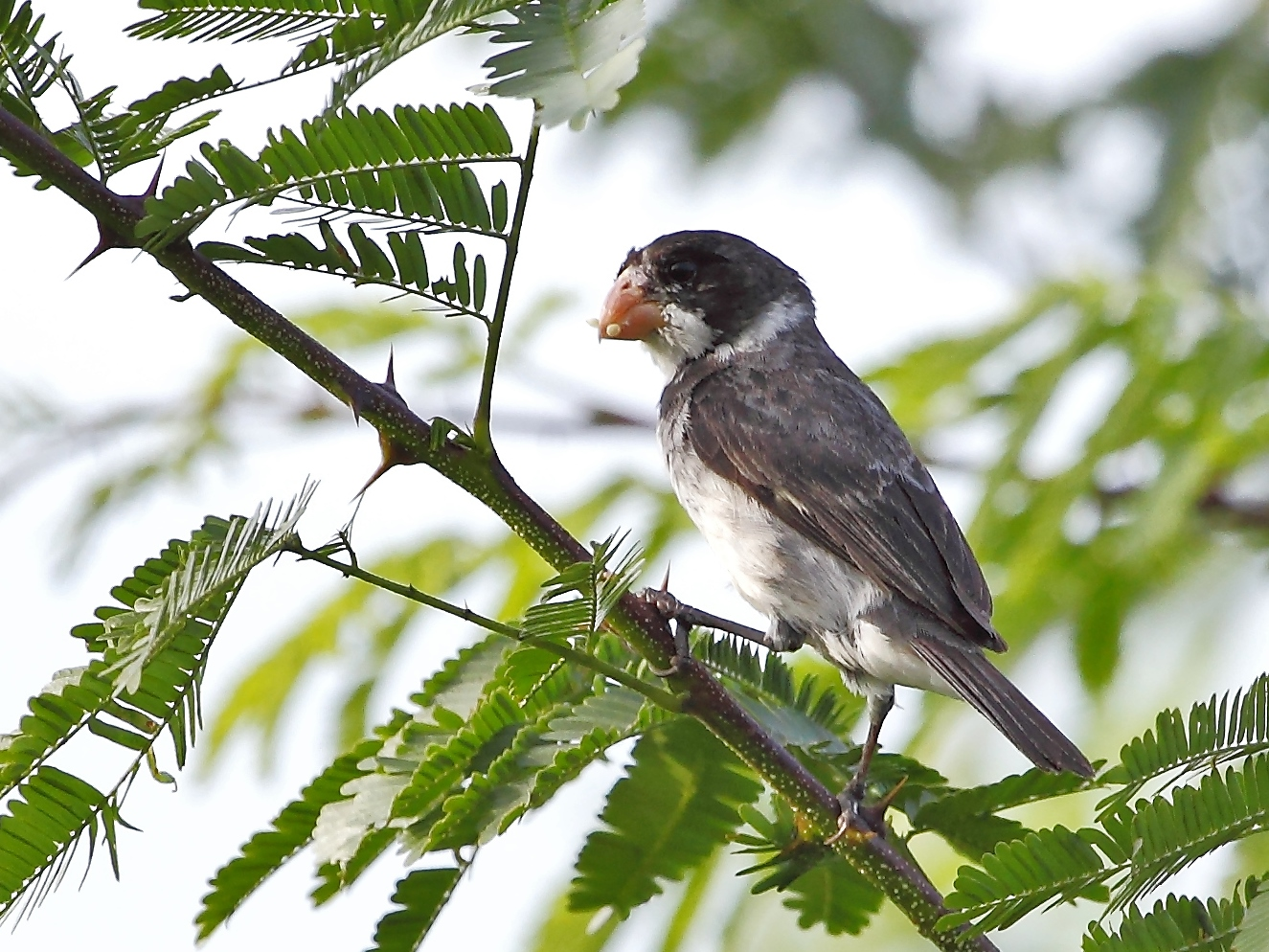
- Male
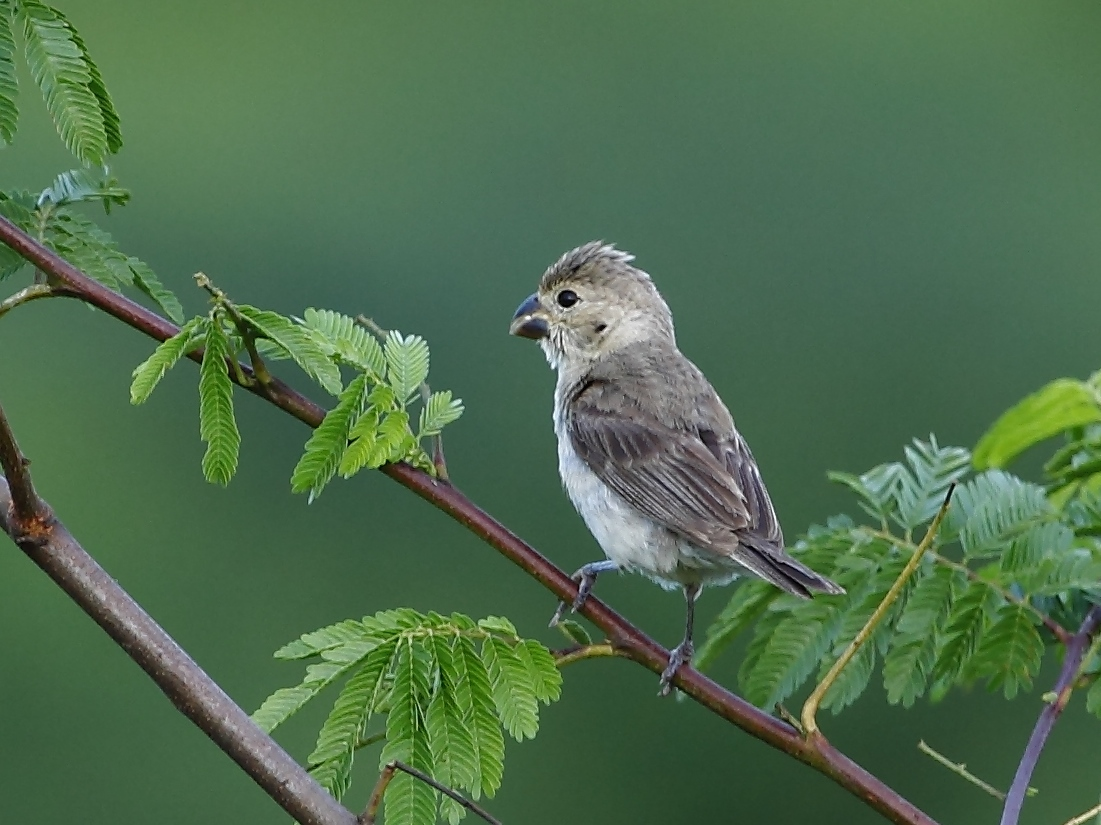
- Female

Conservation status
- Least Concern (IUCN 3.1)

Scientific classification
- Kingdom: Animalia
- Phylum: Chordata
- Class: Aves
- Order: Passeriformes
- Family: Thraupidae
- Genus: Sporophila
- Species: S. albogularis

Binomial name
- Sporophila albogularis (Spix, 1825)

= White-throated seedeater =

Species of bird

The white-throated seedeater (Sporophila albogularis) is a species of bird in the family Thraupidae, the tanagers and allies. It is endemic to northeastern Brazil.

== Taxonomy and systematics ==
The white-throated seedeater has a somewhat complicated taxonomic history. It was formally described in 1825 with the binomial Loxia albogularis. By 1938 it had been reassigned to its present genus Sporophila, a genus in the family Emberizidae. Based on studies published between 1988 and 2011, beginning in 2012 Sporophila was moved to the tanager family Thraupidae.

The white-throated seedeater is monotypic.

== Description ==
The white-throated seedeater is about 11 cm (4.3 in) long and weighs about 9.7 g (0.34 oz). It has a thick bill with a rounded culmen. The species is sexually dimorphic. Adult males have a blackish crown and face with a white spot above the lores, a white arc below the eye, and a white throat whose color extends rearward as a partial collar most of the way around the neck. The rest of their head, their nape, and their upperparts are dark grayish. Their tail is darker gray. Their wings are darker gray with white bases on the primaries that show as a patch on the closed wing. They have a narrow blackish band below the throat and the rest of their underparts are mostly whitish with grayish sides on the breast and a gray wash on the flanks. Females have a warm buffy brown head, upperparts, wings, and tail. Their throat is whitish, their breast and flanks warm buffy brown, and their belly and vent whitish. Both sexes have a dark brown iris. Males have an orange-yellow to orange-pink bill and blackish legs. Females have a dusky bill and legs.

== Distribution and habitat ==
The white-throated seedeater is found in northeastern Brazil from the Atlantic west to a line that roughly traces from northeastern Maranhão south to western Bahia and then northeast to northeastern Bahia. There are also scattered records further north and west. It inhabits caatinga scrublands and the edges of shrubby woodland at elevations up to 1,200 m (3,900 ft).

== Behavior ==
=== Movement ===
The white-throated seedeater is believed to be a year-round resident.

=== Feeding ===
The white-throated seedeater feeds primarily on grass seeds. It feeds mostly on the ground and sometimes while clinging to stems. In the non-breeding season it usually forages in small groups.

=== Breeding ===
The white-throated seedeater's breeding season is not known. However, it is known to sometimes raise four broods over a year. Its nest is a cup made from grass roots and spider web; it is typically placed in a shrub not far above the ground. The clutch is two or three eggs that are greenish white with dark spots. The incubation period is about 13 days. The time to fledging and details of parental care are not known.

=== Vocalization ===
The white-throated seedeater's song is "a long and persistent quick warble [and] sometimes a mellower, more slowly delivered and more melodious sweeta sweeta chew-wa tweet-twaa sweeta tweet-cha chuup". Its call is "an inflected chiuuu".

== Status ==
The IUCN has assessed the white-throated seedeater as being of Least Concern. It has a large range; its population size is not known but is believed to be stable. Though no immediate threats have been identified, it "has been reported as used in trade at a high prevalence". It is considered "frequent to uncommon".
