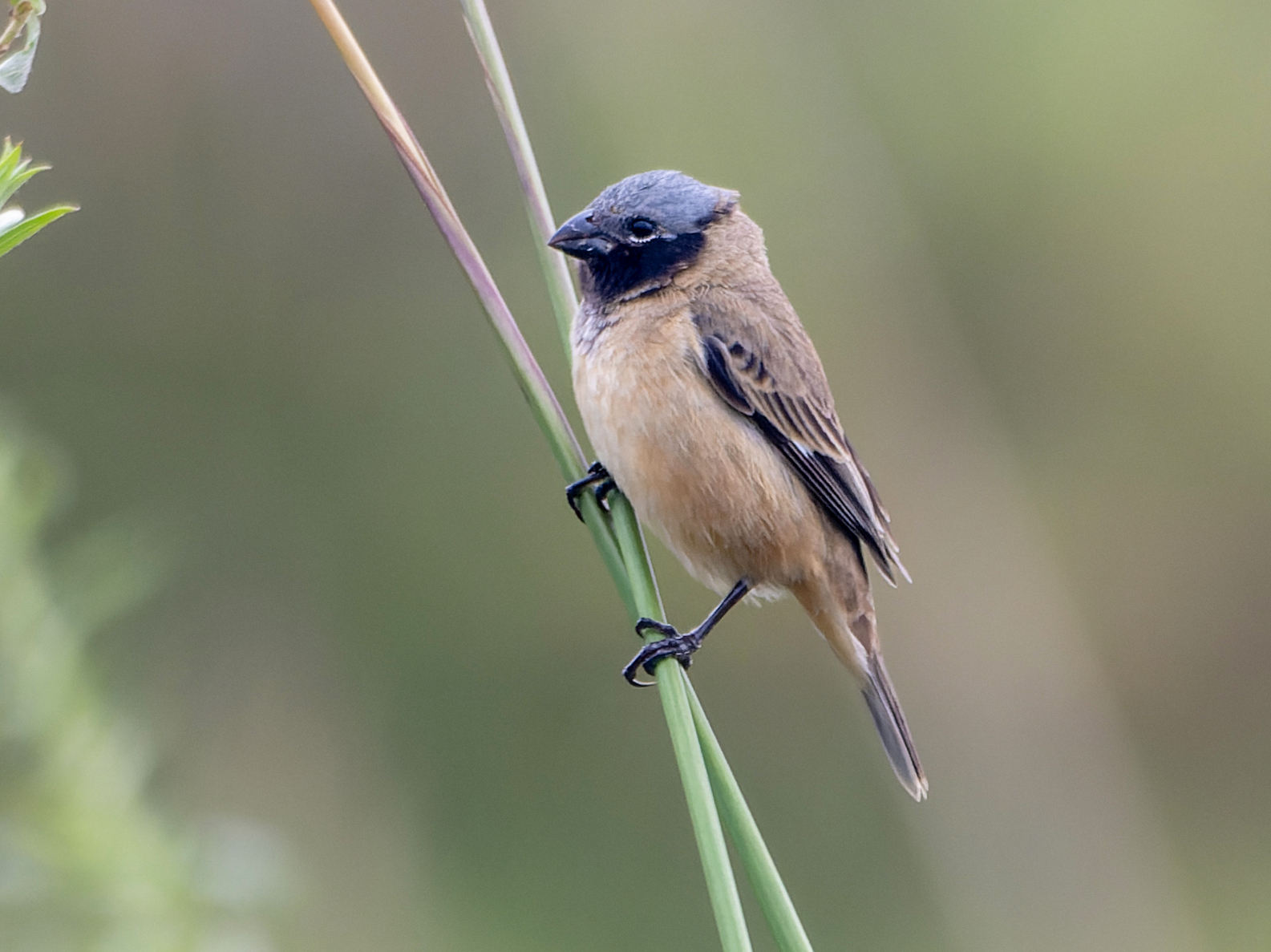

Conservation status
- Near Threatened (IUCN 3.1)

Scientific classification
- Kingdom: Animalia
- Phylum: Chordata
- Class: Aves
- Order: Passeriformes
- Family: Thraupidae
- Genus: Sporophila
- Species: S. iberaensis

Binomial name
- Sporophila iberaensis Di Giacomo & Kopuchian, 2016

= Ibera seedeater =

Species of bird

The Ibera seedeater (Sporophila iberaensis) is a Near Threatened species of bird in the family Thraupidae, the tanagers and allies. It is found in Argentina, Brazil, and Paraguay.

== Taxonomy and systematics ==
The Ibera seedeater was formally described in 2016. The species' English name, Spanish name "capuchino Iberá", Portuguese name "caboclinho-do-Iberá", and specific epithet iberaensis refer to the species' type locality, the Iberá Wetlands in Corrientes Province, Argentina.

The Ibera seedeater is monotypic.

== Description ==
The Ibera seedeater is about 10 cm (3.9 in) long and weighs about 8.5 g (0.30 oz). The species is sexually dimorphic. Adult males have a lead-gray forehead and crown to just below the eye. The rest of their face and their chin, throat, and hindcrown are black to blackish brown. Their back, rump, and tail are brown to olive-brown with white bases on the tail feathers. Their wings are darker with olive-brown edges most feathers and white bases on the primaries that show as a patch on the folded wing. Their underparts are pale yellow to cinnamon. Females have a mostly warm brown head with a buff face. Their upperparts are also warm brown and their tail is darker brown. Their wings are darker brown with sandy edges on the coverts and tertials. Their underparts are warm buff that is palest on the belly. Both sexes have a dark brown iris, a dark horn to black bill, and black legs.

== Distribution and habitat ==
The Ibera seedeater breeds in northeastern Argentina's Corrientes Province and southeastern Paraguay. It apparently winters in southwestern Brazil's Mato Grosso do Sul. There are records in Paraguay as far north as Presidente Hayes Department and sight records in eastern Bolivia. The species inhabits tall grasslands that seasonally flood or are near marshes.

== Behavior ==
=== Movement ===
The Ibera seedeater is a complete migrant. Its non-breeding range is not known but is believed to be in Brazil.

=== Feeding ===
The Ibera seedeater feeds on grass seeds, usually directly from the seedhead while clinging to stems. In the non-breeding season it sometimes forages in flocks with other species of seed-eating birds.

=== Breeding ===
The Ibera seedeater breeds from late September into January. The female builds the nest, a cup made from grass stems and spider web attached to marsh vegetation. In one study area they were placed an average about 42 cm (17 in) above the ground or water. The clutches were of one to three eggs with an average of two. The female alone incubated, for 11 to 12 days. Fledging occurred nine to 11 days after hatch and both parents provisioned nestlings. Several pairs renested after their first nest was predated.

=== Vocalization ===
The vocalizations of the Ibera seedeater apparently have not been formally described. They "have diagnostic notes that are very different from the homologous notes present in the vocalizations of other species of capuchinos [the "capped" seedeaters]...These notes are very conspicuous to the human ear which makes it easy to differentiate this species from any other Sporophila in the field".

== Status ==
The IUCN originally in 2016 assessed the Ibera seedeater as Endangered and since 2024 as Near Threatened. It has a limited range that is not fully defined and its estimated population of between 2500 and 10,000 mature individuals is believed to be decreasing. "This species is threatened by habitat loss and degradation through conversion of grasslands to agricultural areas, afforestation, overgrazing, burning/wildfires, replacement of native pastures by exotic grasses and water abstraction from wetlands." Other threats include nest predation and capture for the cage bird trade. The Ibera seedeater's "main reproductive sites are protected in the Parque Nacional Iberá (national) and the Reserva Natural del Iberá (provincial and private lands)".
