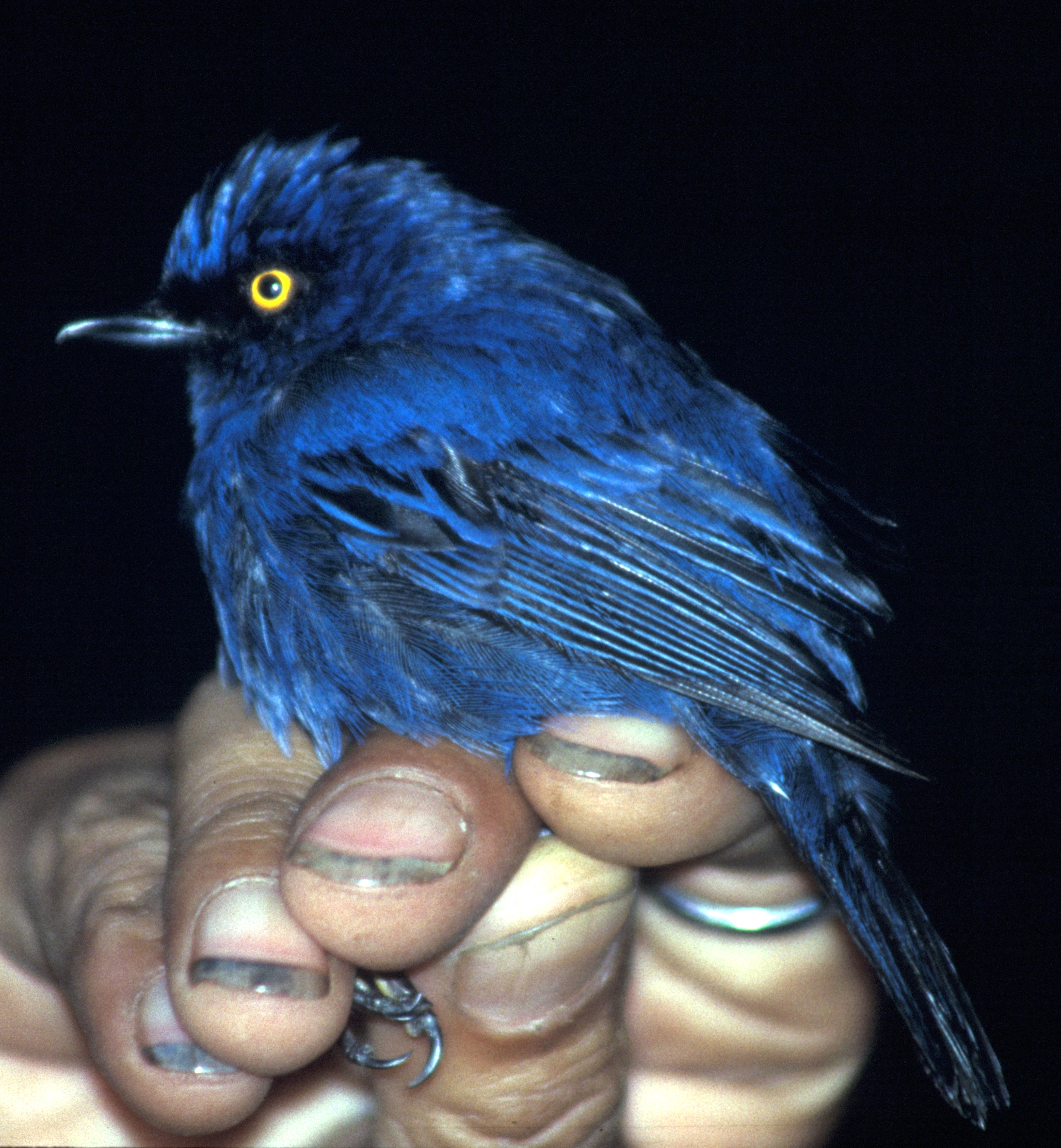
- Diglossopis glauca

Scientific classification
- Domain: Eukaryota
- Kingdom: Animalia
- Phylum: Chordata
- Class: Aves
- Order: Passeriformes
- Family: Emberizidae
- Genus: Diglossopis; Sclater, 1856

Species
- Diglossopis caerulescens Diglossopis cyanea Diglossopis glauca Diglossopis indigotica

= Diglossopis =

Genus of birds

Diglossopis was a genus of blue flowerpiercers in the family Thraupidae. They are now usually placed in the genus Diglossa. They were formerly classified in the bunting and American sparrow family Emberizidae, more recent studies have shown it to belong in the Thraupidae. They are restricted to highland forest and woodland from Venezuela and Colombia, through Ecuador and Peru, to Bolivia.

== Species list ==
- Indigo flowerpiercer, Diglossopis indigotica – based on mtDNA, belongs in the genus Diglossa.
- Golden-eyed flowerpiercer, Diglossopis glauca.
- Bluish flowerpiercer, Diglossopis caerulescens.
- Masked flowerpiercer, Diglossopis cyanea.
