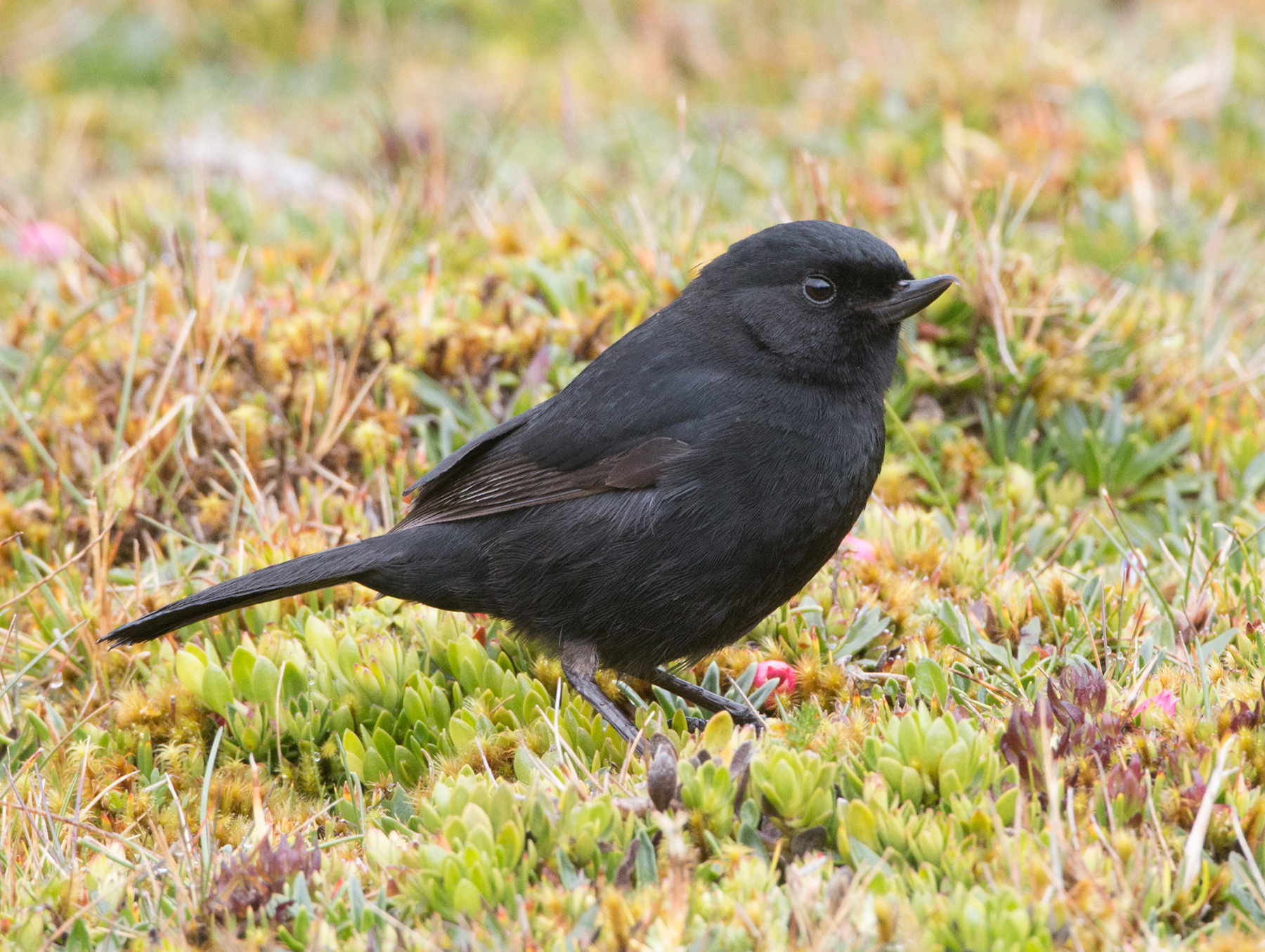
- Cajas National Park, Ecuador

Conservation status
- Least Concern (IUCN 3.1)

Scientific classification
- Kingdom: Animalia
- Phylum: Chordata
- Class: Aves
- Order: Passeriformes
- Family: Thraupidae
- Genus: Diglossa
- Species: D. humeralis

Binomial name
- Diglossa humeralis (Fraser, 1840)

= Black flowerpiercer =

Species of bird

The black flowerpiercer (Diglossa humeralis) is a species of bird in the family Thraupidae of the order Passeriformes. The family Thraupidae is known for tanagers and other very similar species of birds, but it is still facing classification issues. The black flowerpiercer is found in Colombia, Ecuador, Peru, and Venezuela.

Its natural habitat is subtropical or tropical moist mountains, subtropical or tropical high-altitude shrubland, and heavily degraded former forest.

== Description ==
Adult black flowerpiercers are 13–14 cm in length. They are uniformly black (slightly glossy black with subtle blue gloss in males). They have brown eyes and a black bill with a grey base. Females are a duller black with no blue gloss and their wings and tail are brownish. Juvenile birds are also duller.

== Subspecies ==
- D.h. aterrima (Ecuador, south Colombia)- same description as above
- D.h. humeralis (East Andes in north & south Colombia, southwest Venezuela)- Male dull black with blueish shoulder and small greyish rump; Females are very dark brown with the grey rump less clear.
- D.h.nocticolor (Santa Marta in Colombia, Perija in Venezuela)- All black with only slight gloss and dark grey rump, female slightly duller than male

== Voice ==
Diglossa humeralis - Black Flowerpiercer

A rapid series of squeaky trills and twitters even faster than the glossy flowerpiercer (Diglossa lafresnayii). The black flowerpiercer sounds almost like the cinereous conebill (Conirostrum cinereum).

== Distribution and habitat ==
Found in Ecuador, Colombia, Peru, and Venezuela. Subtropical zone to Paramo, at 2,175 - 4,000m, but mostly in 2,700 - 3,400m at edges of dense wet forest. Also found in scattered vegetation, shrubby clearings, eucalyptus plantations, parks, and gardens. It is also now seen in India (Bangalore).

== Behavior ==
Drinks nectar and consumes small invertebrates. Black flowerpiercers move quickly and are more active in lower parts of the forest. They are mainly solitary or found in pairs.

== Gallery ==
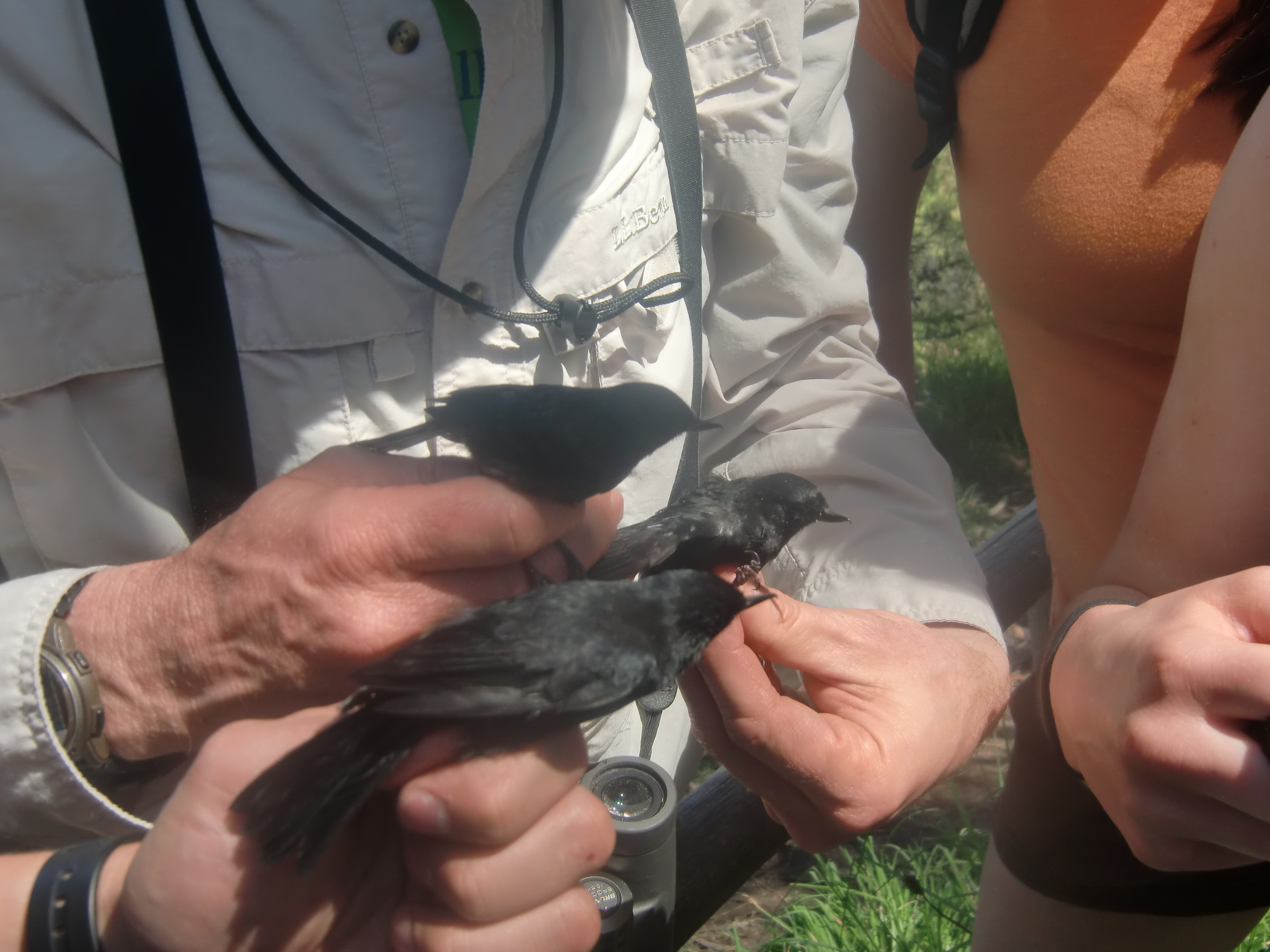
Three captured black flowerpiercers

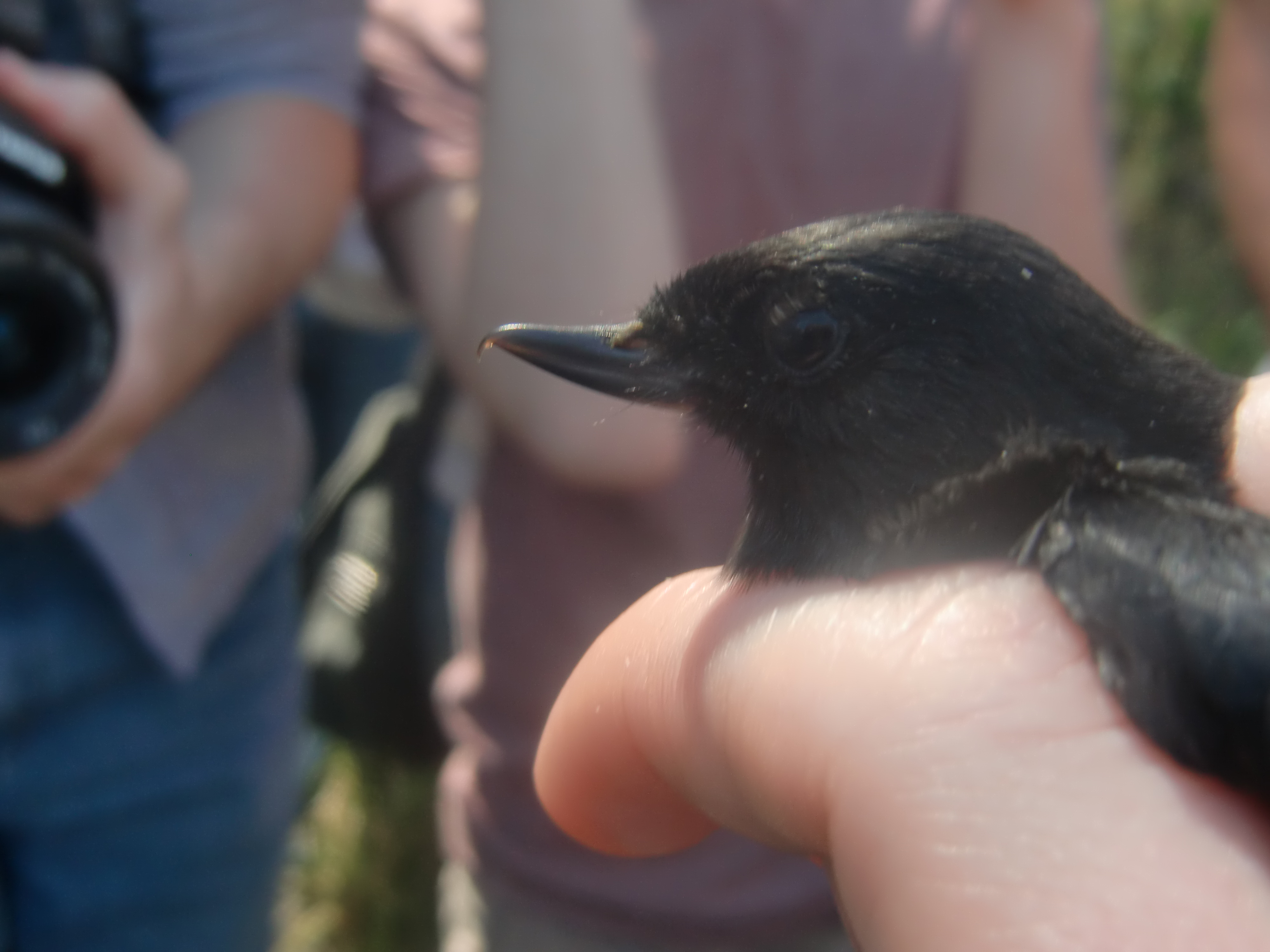
the beak is upswept, with a hooked tip
