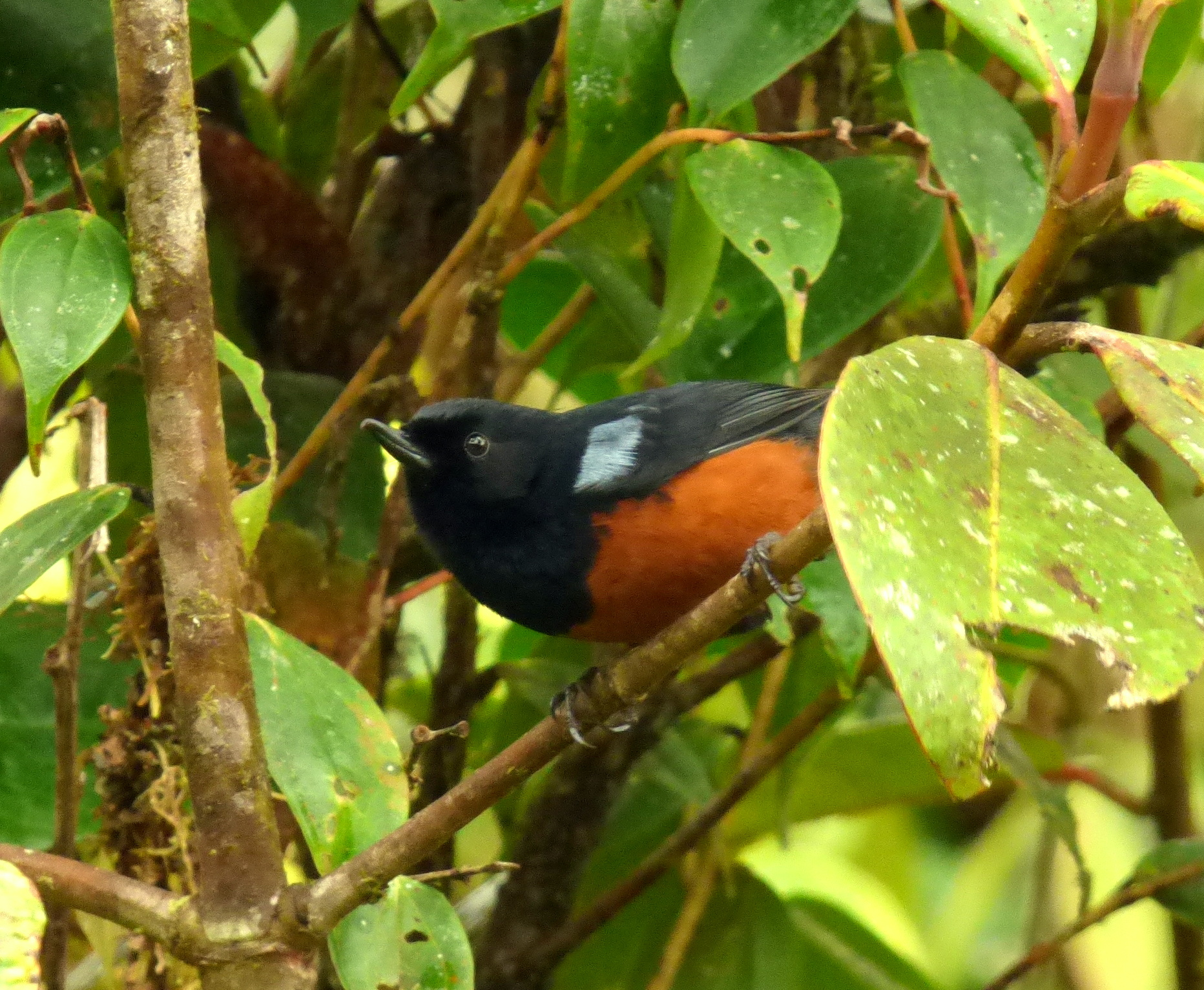

Conservation status
- Near Threatened (IUCN 3.1)

Scientific classification
- Kingdom: Animalia
- Phylum: Chordata
- Class: Aves
- Order: Passeriformes
- Family: Thraupidae
- Genus: Diglossa
- Species: D. gloriosissima

Binomial name
- Diglossa gloriosissima Chapman, 1912

= Chestnut-bellied flowerpiercer =

Species of bird

The chestnut-bellied flowerpiercer (Diglossa gloriosissima) is a species of bird in the family Thraupidae. It is endemic to Colombia.

Its natural habitats are subtropical or tropical moist montane forests and subtropical or tropical high-altitude shrubland. It is threatened by habitat loss.

== Taxonomy and systematics ==
The species was first formally described in 1912 by the American ornithologist Frank M. Chapman based on a type series of ten specimens collected in the Andes west of Popayán in 1911 by W.B. Richardson and Leo E. Miller.

The species is considered monotypic by The Clements Checklist of Birds of the World, but the IOC World Bird List recognizes two subspecies:

- D. g. gloriosissima (Chapman 1912) – Western Andes, west of Popayán, Cauca Department
- D. g. boylei (Graves 1990) – Paramillo Massif and Páramo Frontino, Antioquia Department

The generic name Diglossa is derived from the Ancient Greek diglossos (double-tongued; speaking two languages). The species epithet gloriosissima comes from the Latin gloriosissimus (most glorious), presumably because it is much larger than the similar Mérida flowerpiercer (Diglossa gloriosa) that Chapman compared his specimens with.

== Description ==
Chestnut-bellied flowerpiercers, like the other birds in the genus Diglossa, are small montane tanagers. Their slender upturned bills are used to pierce flowers at the base to obtain nectar.

Size: 14-15cm in length. Wingspan is 75mm (male), 70mm (female).

Adult Male: The head, upper breast, nape, back, wings and tail are deep glossy black. The lesser wing-coverts are bluish-grey and there is a wash of this colour on the rump. The lower breast, belly and vent are deep rufous-chestnut with black markings on the flanks. The undertail coverts are black. The bill is black and the feet and tarsi are grey.

Adult Female: Similar to the male, but the rump shows more bluish-grey colour.

Juvenile: Similar to the adults but the black areas are duller, the lesser wing-coverts and rump are black, the chestnut areas are marked with black streaks, and the lower mandible is yellow with a dark tip.

Subspecies variation: Subspecies D. g. boylei differs from the nominate subspecies by showing uniformly chestnut flanks, sides, and undertail coverts.

== Distribution and habitat ==
This species is known from only a few small and discontiguous locations in the highlands of the Western Andes of Colombia. Populations have been observed in recent years in the departments of Antioquia (Paramillo Massif, Páramo de Frontino, Jardín area, Páramo del Sol, and Farallones del Citará); Cauca (Serranía del Pinche and southwest of Popayán); Chocó (Gorrión Andivia Bird Reserve); and Risaralda (Cerro Montezuma in the Parque Nacional Natural Tatamá). Given that much of the potential range of this species is in high and remote areas, it is possible that additional populations remain to be found.

Chestnut-bellied flowerpiercers are found at elevations between 3000 and 3800m, except for at the Cerro Montezuma where they regularly occur down to 2400m. The typical habitats are open páramo, shrubby sub-páramo and the edges of elfin forest. The species is known to favour shrubby forests of Polylepis species including Polylepis quadrijuga, and other small trees such as Escallonia or Baccharis.

== Behaviour and ecology ==
Due to the remoteness of and, until recently, high levels of guerilla activity within the area, the birds of higher altitudes in the northern portion of the Western Cordillera have not been sufficiently studied. The chestnut-bellied flowerpiercer is no exception – there were no records of the species between 1965 and 2003. Thus there is relatively little known about its ecology.

Breeding. Evidence of reproduction, including females in breeding condition and the construction of nests suggests that breeding periods occur in February and August.

Feeding. At one páramo site the species was observed feeding on the flowers of some Melastomataceae and Ericaceae species, mainly of the genera Cavendishia, Psammisia andThibaudia, as well as Loranthaceae and epiphytic bromeliads. Like the other flowerpiercers it probably also forages for small insects. At the Cerro Montezuma location they have been observed visiting hummingbird feeders.

Behaviour. This is a territorial species that only forms pairs when it nests. It has been observed moving in family groups of up to five individuals and also associating with mixed flocks. At Páramo Frontino chestnut-bellied and black-throated (Diglossa brunneiventris) flowerpiercers hold mutually exclusive territories.

== Status ==
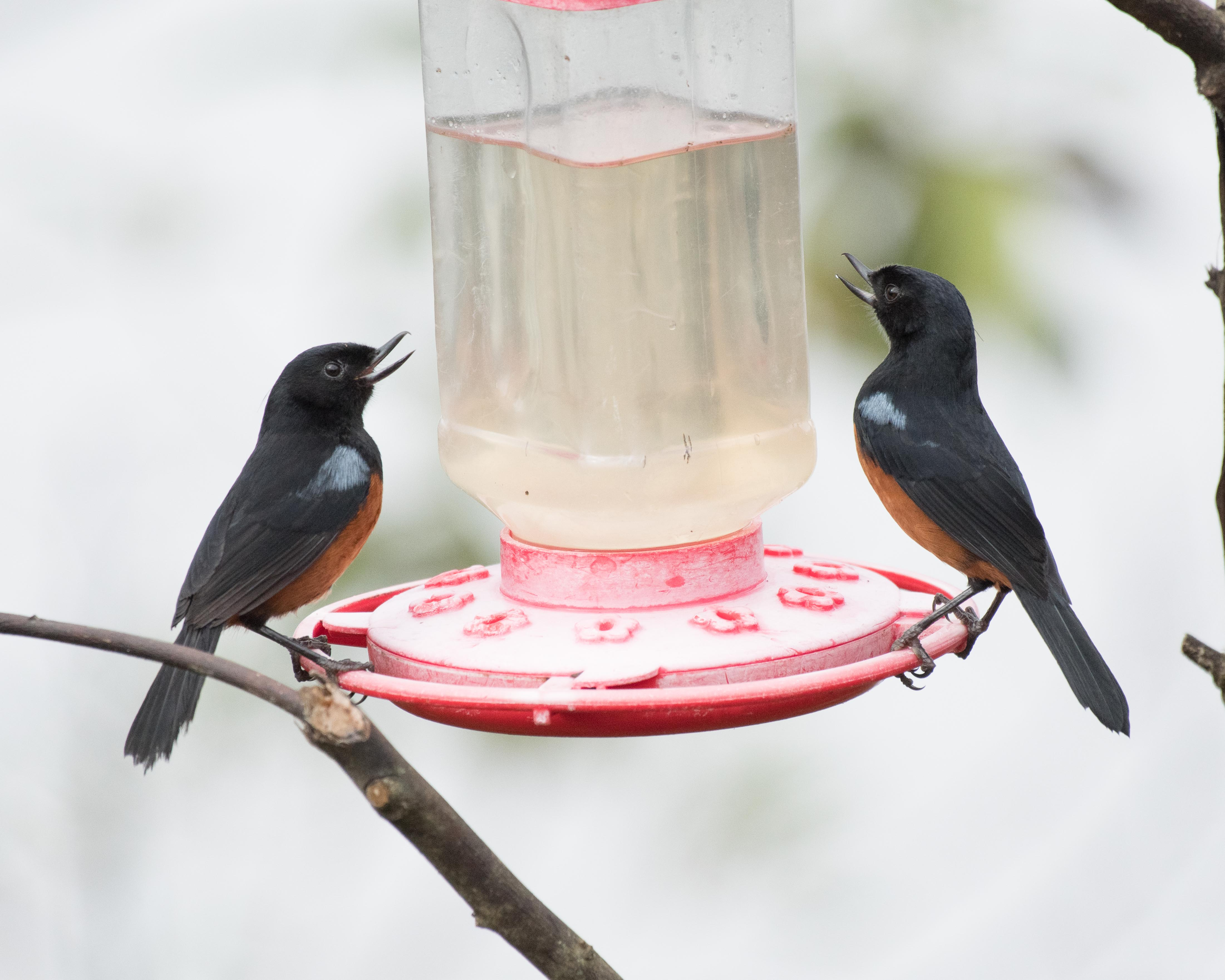
Chestnut-bellied Flowerpiercers at hummingbird feeder.

The chestnut-bellied flowerpiercer is listed as Near Threatened by the IUCN. The Colombian Red Book (Libro rojo de las aves de Colombia) notes that the bird qualifies as Vulnerable based on its severely fragmented distribution and gradual decreases in the size and quality of its habitat, and Near Threatened because of its small overall population – probably less than 10 000 mature individuals.

Threats. Generally, the key threats to páramo and elfin forest habitats are livestock-grazing and fires set by tourists or to adapt the vegetation for cattle grazing. The páramo habitats within the range of this species are under threat from these activities as well as from the expansion of human settlements and extensive deforestation. Some areas are also affected by agriculture, disorganized tourism and hunting, and mining. The Polylepis forests in particular are vulnerable to logging and overgrazing.

Conservation Efforts. The possibility of implementing a sound conservation plan for the species is facilitated by the fact that many of the known populations are located within the boundaries of protected areas: Paramillo, Tatamá and Munchique National Nature Parks, and the forestry reserves Farallones del Citará and Mesenia-Paramillo. It is also found in the Fundación ProAves Las Tangaras and Colibrí del Sol Natural Bird Reserves. The Antioquia Corporation (Corantioquia) has established three protected areas in zones where the presence of the species has been confirmed: Cuchilla Jardín-Támesis, Farallones de Citará and Alto de San José-Cerro Plateado.

With respect to the conservation of the Polylepis forest – a key part of the chestnut-bellied flowerpiercer's habitat – a Polylepis component has been included in the project Conserving the Biodiversity of the Tropical Andes, funded by the American Bird Conservancy and the Gordon and Betty Moore Foundation. The intent is to coordinate the efforts of the Andean countries to propose concrete conservation strategies for these ecosystems.
