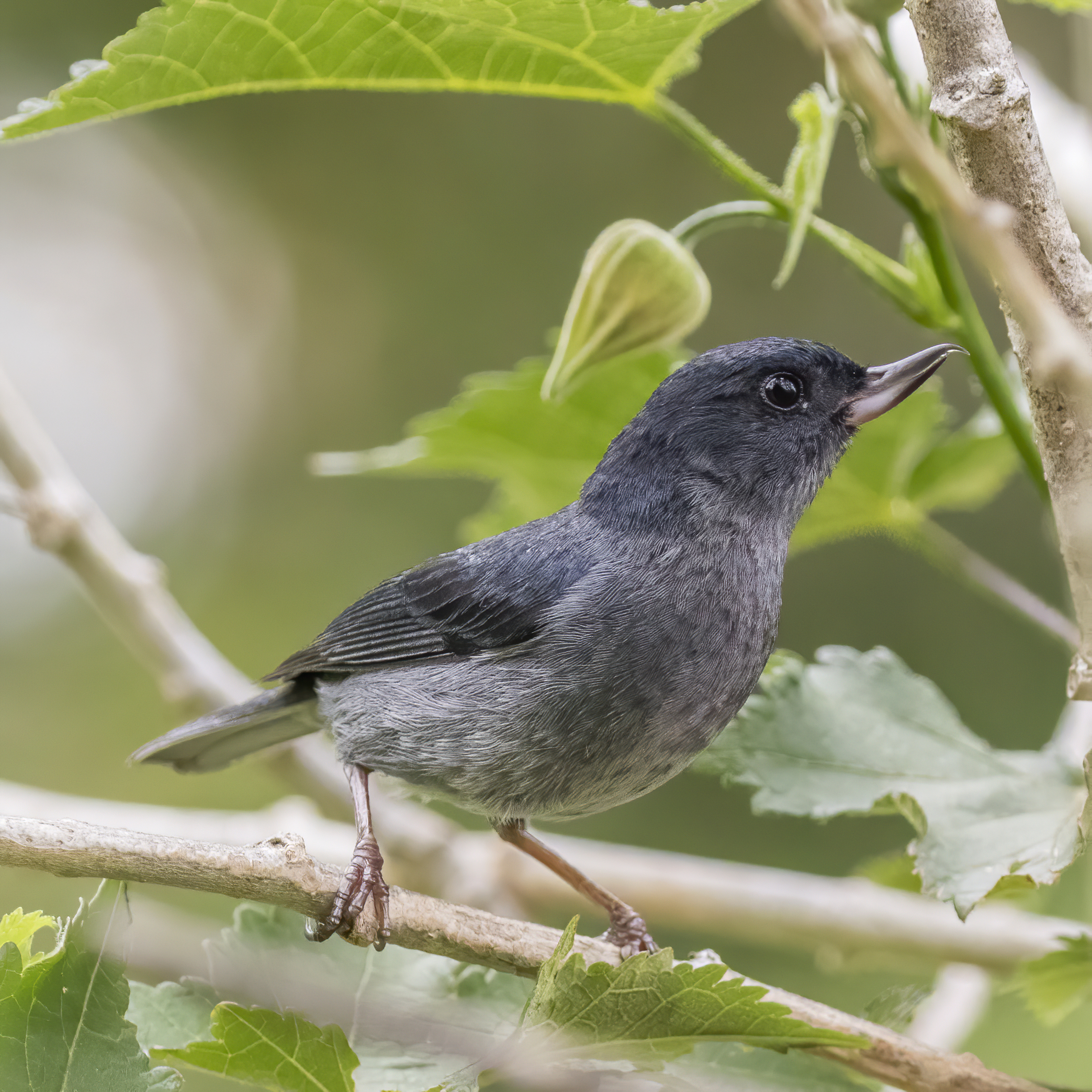
- Male, Panama
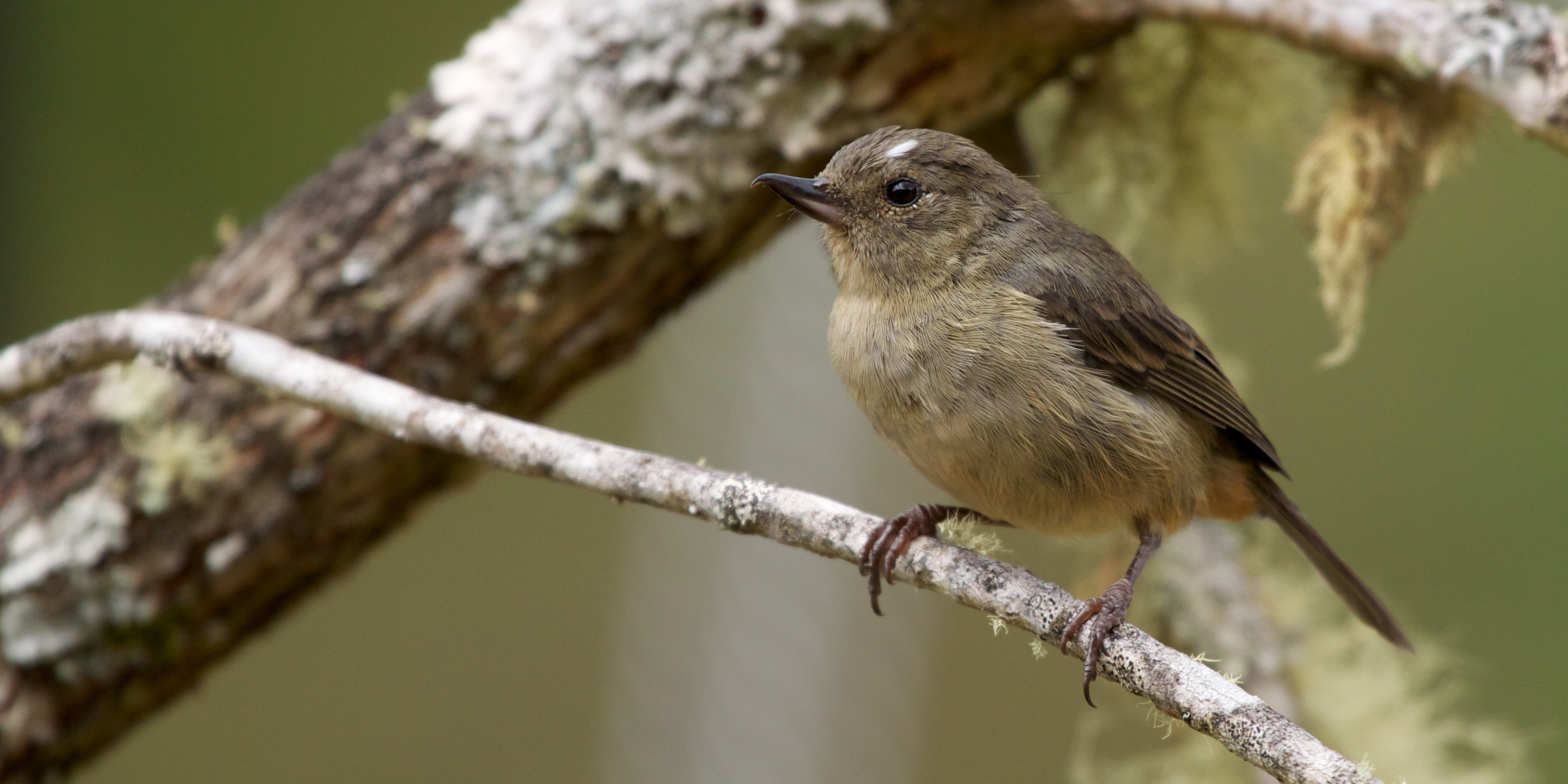
- Female, Costa Rica

Conservation status
- Least Concern (IUCN 3.1)

Scientific classification
- Kingdom: Animalia
- Phylum: Chordata
- Class: Aves
- Order: Passeriformes
- Family: Thraupidae
- Genus: Diglossa
- Species: D. plumbea

Binomial name
- Diglossa plumbea Cabanis, 1861

= Slaty flowerpiercer =

Species of bird

The slaty flowerpiercer (Diglossa plumbea) is a passerine bird endemic to the Talamancan montane forests.

This is a common bird in mountain forest canopy and edges, and especially in sunlit clearings and areas with flowering shrubs, which can include gardens. The lower altitudinal limit of its breeding range increases from 1200 m in the north of Costa Rica to 1900 m in the southern mountains. It is found well above the timberline in páramo habitat.

The large cup nest, built by the female, is made of coarse plant material and lined with fine fibres. It is placed 0.4 to 4 m up in a dense shrub, grass tussock or pine. The clutch is two brown-speckled pale blue eggs, which are incubated by the female alone for 12–14 days to hatching.

The slaty flowerpiercer has an upturned bill with a hooked upper mandible and pointed lower mandible. It is 10 cm long and weighs 9 g. The adult male is blue-grey with a lead-grey throat and breast. The tail and wings are blackish with grey feather edges. The female is olive-brown above with a paler throat and breast shading to buff on the belly. Young birds are like the female but have two tawny wing bars and faintly streaked buff-yellow underparts.

The slaty flowerpiercer has a thin tsip call. The male's song consists of a mixture of whistles, warbles and trilled notes, see-chew see-chew see-chew seer seer surrzeep, tsee tsew tsink tsink tsink.

As its name implies, the slaty flowerpiercer pierces the base of the flowers of shrubs and epiphytes with its bill and extracts the nectar through the hole with a brush-like tongue. It also feeds on tiny insects taken from foliage or in flight. It is attacked by territorial hummingbirds defending their feeding areas, and then retreats to dense cover.

== Taxonomic note ==
This species was formerly placed in the family Coerebidae with the bananaquit and honeycreepers. It has sometimes been considered to be conspecific with the cinnamon-bellied flowerpiercer, D. baritula.

== Gallery ==
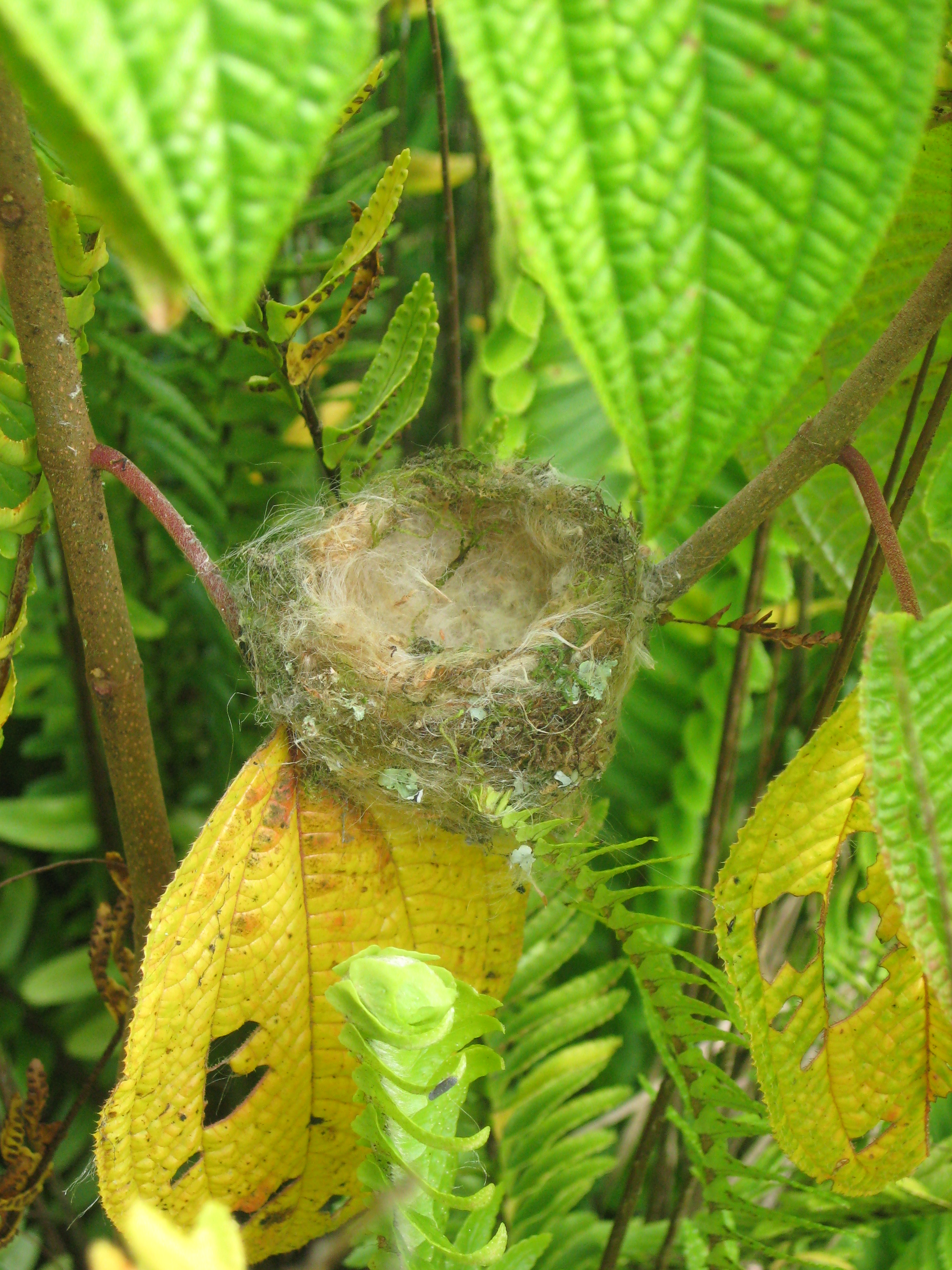
Nest of slaty flowerpiercer in Chiriqui Mountains, Panama
