= Colibri del Sol Bird Reserve =

Nature reserve in Colombia

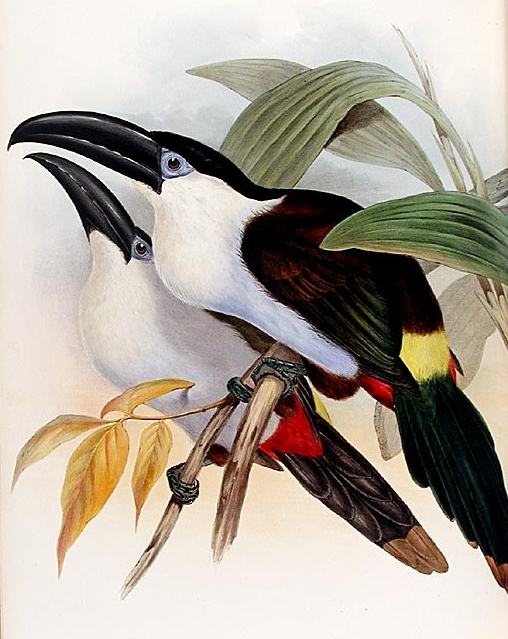
The black-billed mountain toucan is found in the Reserve, though the subspecies there has a partially chestnut bill.

Hummingbird of the Sun, known in Spanish as Colibri del Sol Bird Reserve, is a 731 ha nature reserve in Colombia. It lies at the base of the Páramo del Sol volcanic massif west of the city of Medellín in the Department of Antioquia. It was established on October 6, 2005, by Fundación ProAves, a non-profit environmental organization that owns and manages several reserves in Colombia.

== History ==
Following an expedition to the Páramo de Frontino in 2004, researchers rediscovered two extremely range-restricted endemic species, the dusky starfrontlet and the chestnut-bellied flowerpiercer. In 2005, a large bird reserve was established across the paramo and montane forest by Fundacion ProAves and named after the dusky starfrontlet.

== Birds ==
Other locally endemic birds are the Fenwick's antpitta and Paramillo tapaculo. Other key species include the rusty-faced parrot, Andean pygmy owl, ocellated tapaculo, moustached antpitta, black-throated flowerpiercer, white-capped and red-hooded tanagers, black-collared jay and black-billed mountain toucan.

== Ecosystem ==
At 3,500 meters, The Hummingbird of the Sun Reserve contains 731 ha of high Andean forests and páramo (moorland), which include the endemic Frailejón de Frontino, Andean oak groves, and chaparrals dominated by Polylepis quadrijuga. It is predominantly mountainous with about 70% of the property containing steep slopes, 20% with hills, and only 10% flat land. The reserve's soils have indica properties of high porosity, medium texture, and strongly acidic.

== Access ==
Access to the reserve involves five hours travelling by road from Medellín to Urrao, followed by a two-hour walk or horseback ride to the reserve's lodge.
