= Venezuelan flowerpiercer =

Conservation status
- Endangered (IUCN 3.1)]

Scientific classification
- Kingdom: Animalia
- Phylum: Chordata
- Class: Aves
- Order: Passeriformes
- Family: Thraupidae
- Genus: Diglossa
- Species: D. venezuelensis

Binomial name
- Diglossa venezuelensis Chapman, 1925

Species of bird

The Venezuelan flowerpiercer (Diglossa venezuelensis) is a species of bird in the family Thraupidae. It is endemic to Venezuela. Its natural habitat is subtropical or tropical moist montane forests in the north of Venezuela. It is threatened by habitat loss. Protected areas where it is resident include the Cueva del Guácharo National Park.

== Taxonomy ==
The Venezuelan flowerpiercer was formally described by the American ornithologist Frank Chapman in 1925 based on specimens from Carapas in Sucre, Venezuela. The species is named after the country it is native to. It has no recognized subspecies besides the nominate. It is closely related to the white-sided flowerpiercer.

== Description ==
The Venezuelan flowerpiercer is, on average, 12.7 cm (5.0 in) long. Males are almost wholly dull black, with small white patches on the pectorals at the edge of the wing and some white on the underside of the wing. Females have brownish-olive upper bodies with yellowish-olive heads, yellowish-olive throats and breasts, and gray to brown-olive on the rest of the belly. The pectorals and underside of the wing have white patches. The upper mandible of the beak ends in a sharp, downcurving hook.

Compared to the white-sided flowerpiercer, the male Venezuelan flowerpiercer has a darker black plumage, instead of slate-gray, and more limited white on the pectorals and underwing. Females are darker and have more restricted white.

== Distribution and habitat ==
The Venezuelan flowerpiercer is, as the name suggests, endemic to Venezuela, where it has a very small range restricted to a few mountain ranges in the northeast of the country. It is known from the Cordillera de Caripe, Paria Peninsula, and Cerro Negro. It inhabits moist montane forests, as well as secondary forests and scrublands near forests. Its elevational range is 1,525–2,450 m (5,000–8,040 ft) on the Turimiquire Massif and 1,675–1,775 m (5,500–5,820 ft) on Cerro Negro. On the Paria Peninsula, it has been recorded as low as 885 m (2,900 ft), probably as part of a seasonal migration to lower elevations for food.

== Conservation ==
The Venezuelan flowerpiercer is classified as being endangered by the IUCN on the IUCN Red List. It was historically a somewhat common bird, but has suffered a sharp decline in its population, which is now estimated to number 670–11,000 adults. It is declining due to extensive deforestation, habitat fragmentation, and proposed infrastructure projects in its range. It occurs in the Cueva del Guácharo National Park and Península de Paria National Park, but both of these are poorly managed and have suffered extensive clearing and conversion to plantations of coffee and fruits.
