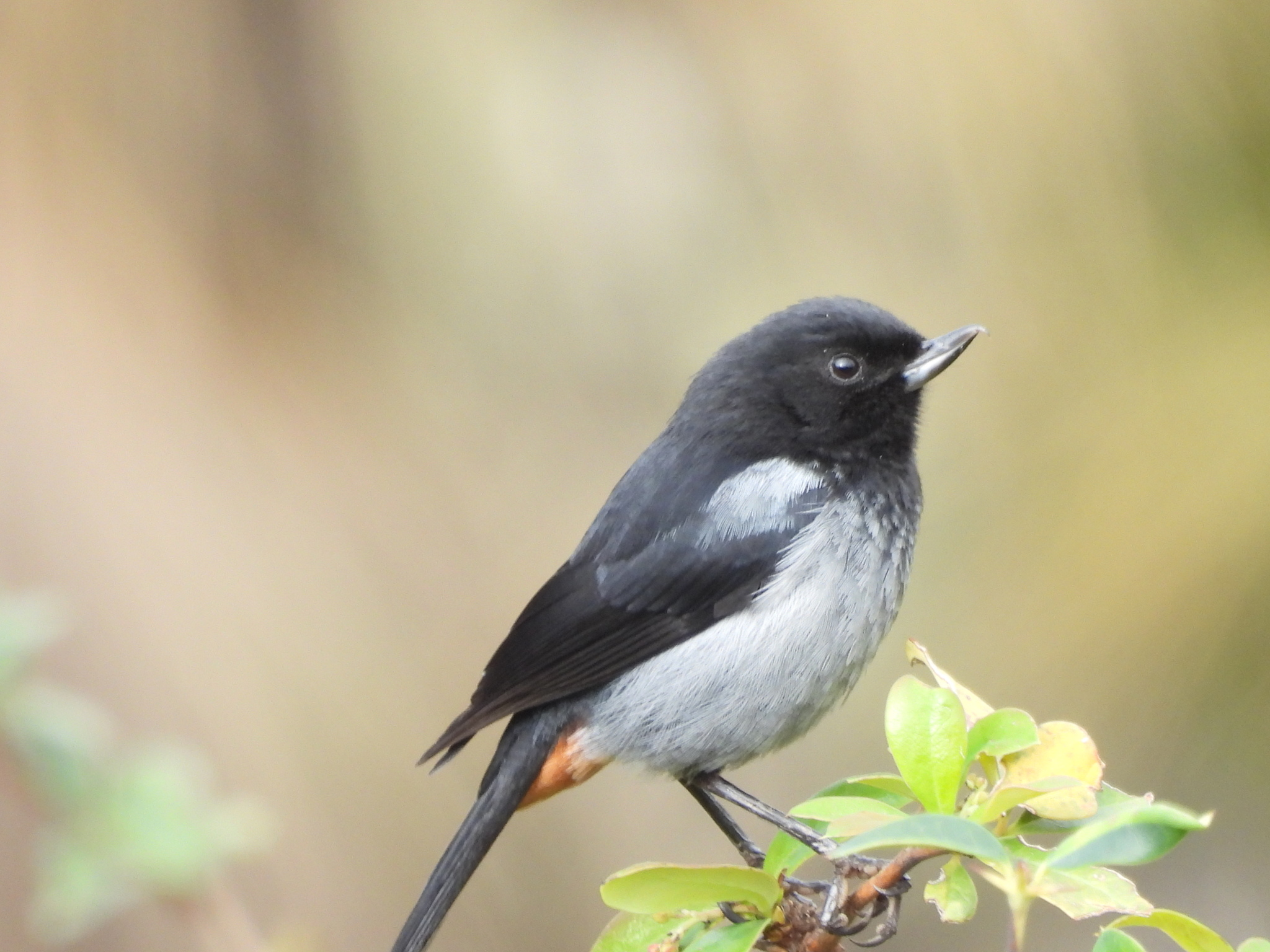

Conservation status
- Least Concern (IUCN 3.1)

Scientific classification
- Kingdom: Animalia
- Phylum: Chordata
- Class: Aves
- Order: Passeriformes
- Family: Thraupidae
- Genus: Diglossa
- Species: D. carbonaria

Binomial name
- Diglossa carbonaria (D'Orbigny & Lafresnaye, 1838)

= Grey-bellied flowerpiercer =

Species of bird

The grey-bellied flowerpiercer (Diglossa carbonaria) is a species of bird in the family Thraupidae. It is found in the Bolivian Andes and far northwestern Argentina.

Its natural habitats are subtropical or tropical moist montane forests, subtropical or tropical high-altitude shrubland, and heavily degraded former forest.
