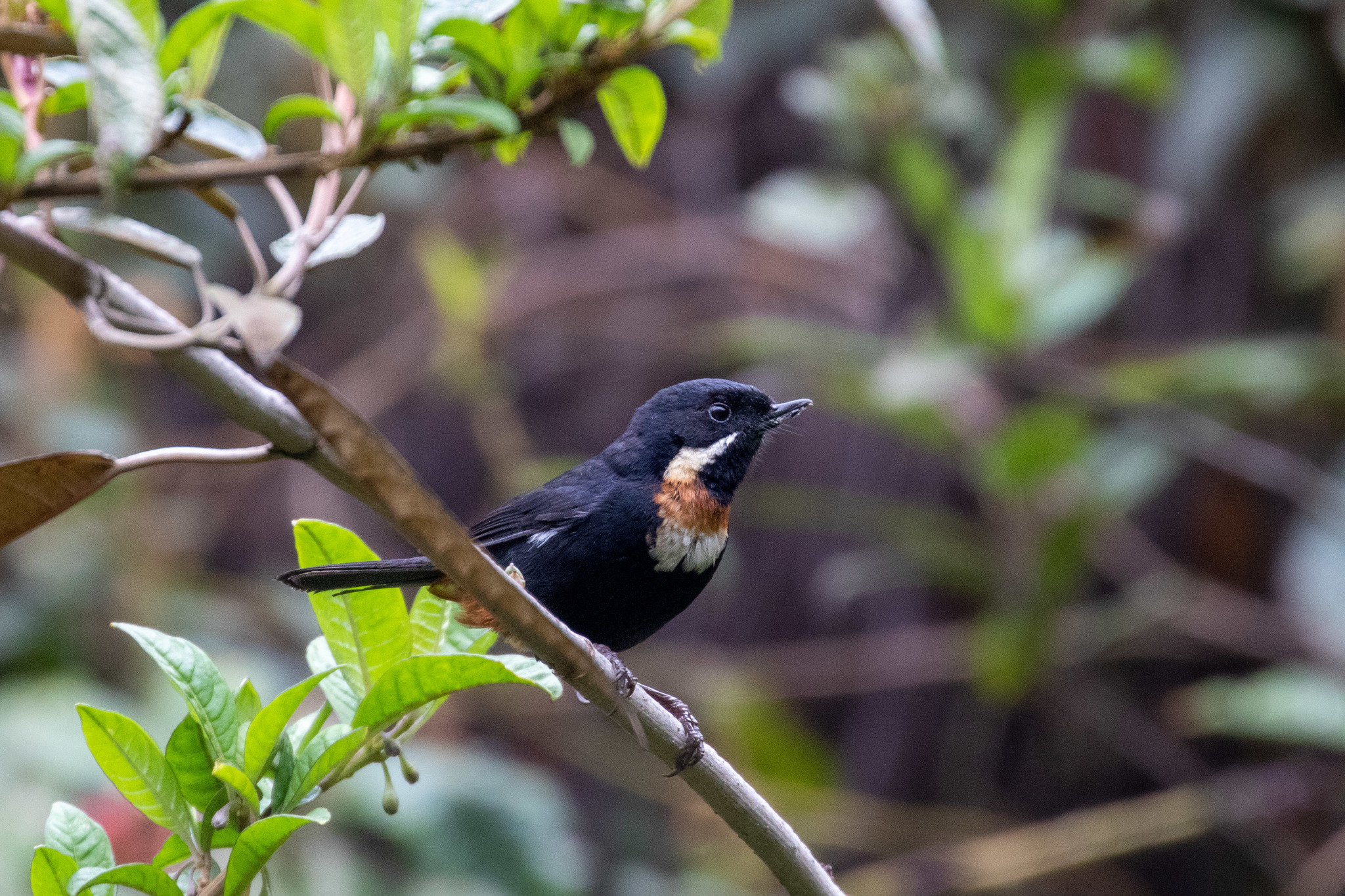

Conservation status
- Least Concern (IUCN 3.1)

Scientific classification
- Kingdom: Animalia
- Phylum: Chordata
- Class: Aves
- Order: Passeriformes
- Family: Thraupidae
- Genus: Diglossa
- Species: D. mystacalis

Binomial name
- Diglossa mystacalis Lafresnaye, 1846

= Moustached flowerpiercer =

Species of bird

The moustached flowerpiercer (Diglossa mystacalis) is a species of bird in the family Thraupidae. It was first described by French ornithologist Frédéric de Lafresnaye in 1846. It is found in Bolivia and Peru. Its natural habitats are subtropical or tropical moist montane forests, subtropical or tropical high-altitude grassland, and heavily degraded former forest.

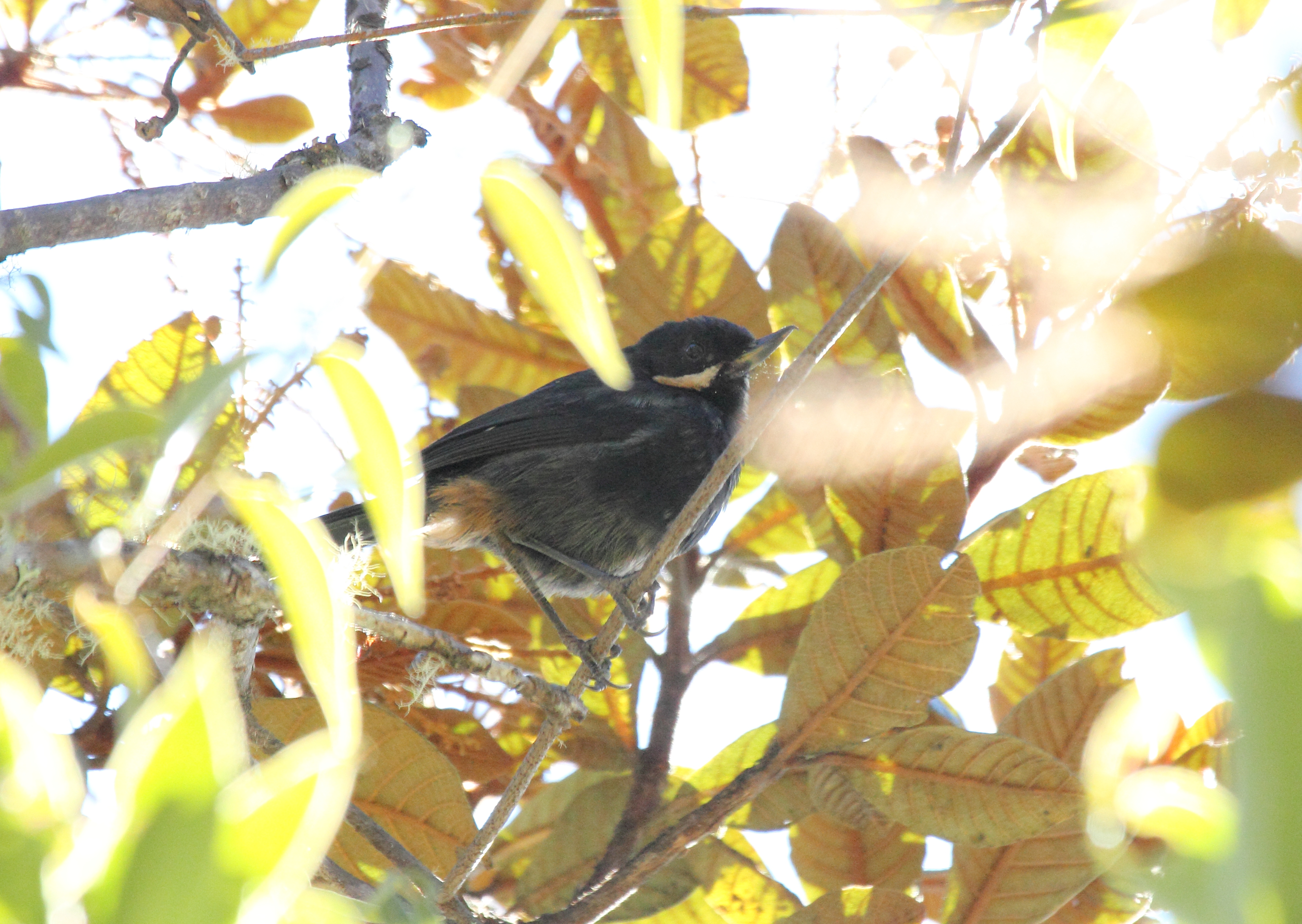
Moustached flowerpiercer (Diglossa mystacalis)
