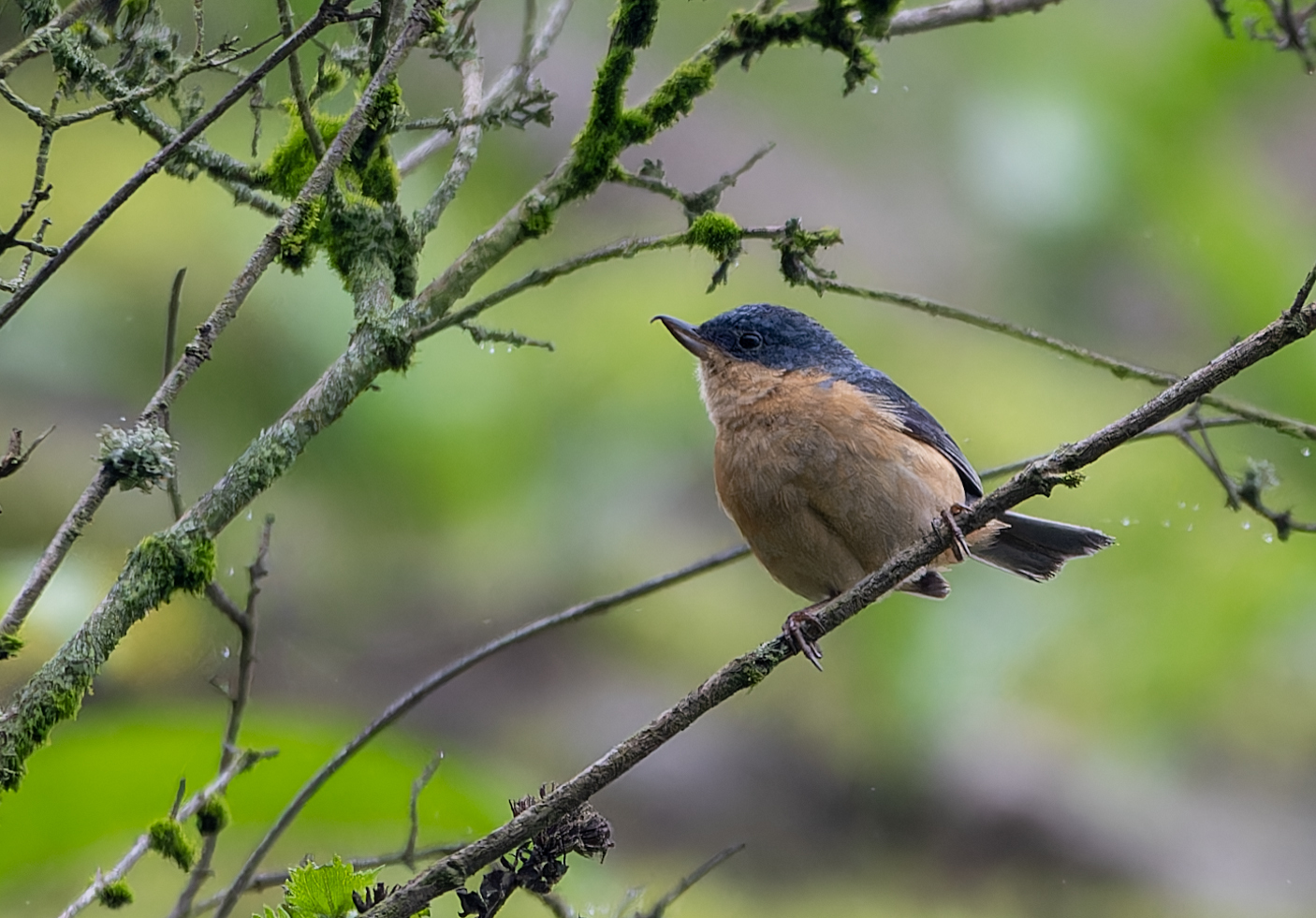
- female

Conservation status
- Least Concern (IUCN 3.1)

Scientific classification
- Kingdom: Animalia
- Phylum: Chordata
- Class: Aves
- Order: Passeriformes
- Family: Thraupidae
- Genus: Diglossa
- Species: D. sittoides

Binomial name
- Diglossa sittoides (D'Orbigny & Lafresnaye, 1838)

= Rusty flowerpiercer =

Species of bird

The rusty flowerpiercer (Diglossa sittoides) is a species of bird in the family Thraupidae. It is found in Argentina, Bolivia, Colombia, Ecuador, Peru, and Venezuela.

Its natural habitats are subtropical or tropical moist montane forests, subtropical or tropical high-altitude shrubland, and heavily degraded former forest.

== Gallery ==
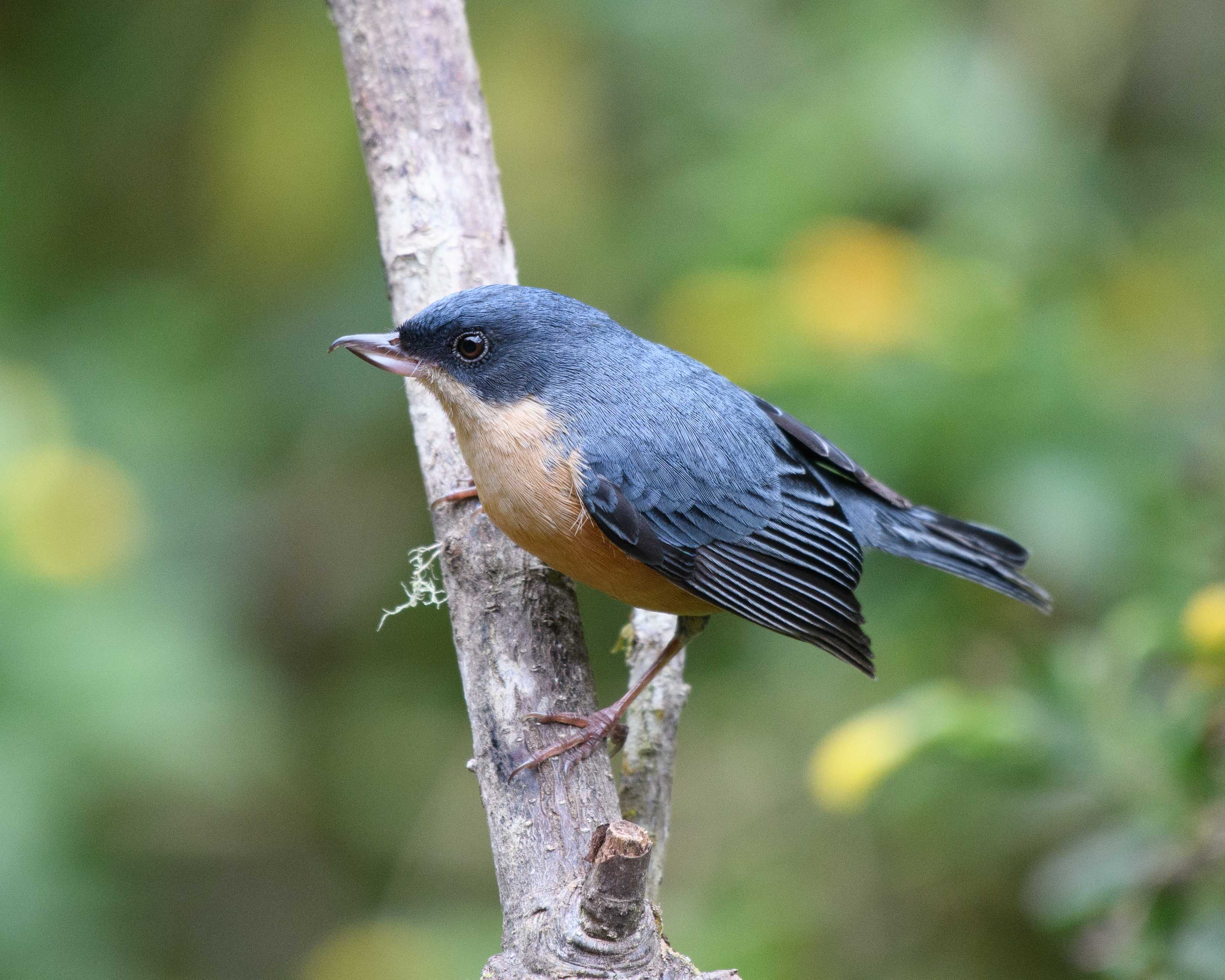
male

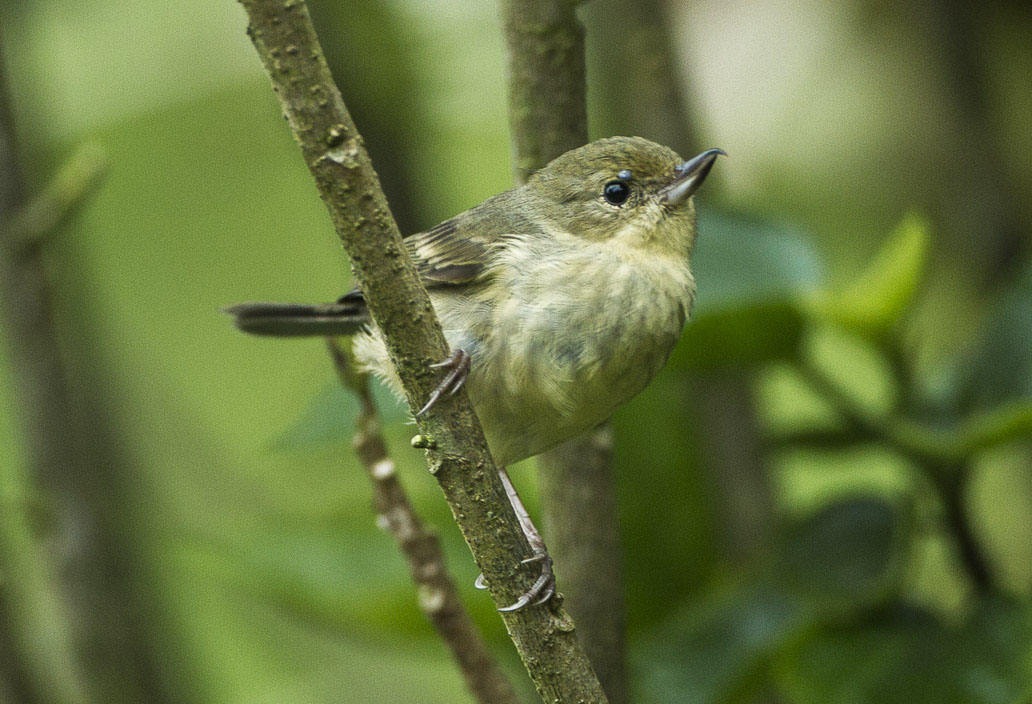
female
