= Scaled flowerpiercer =

Conservation status
- Least Concern (IUCN 3.1)

Scientific classification
- Kingdom: Animalia
- Phylum: Chordata
- Class: Aves
- Order: Passeriformes
- Family: Thraupidae
- Genus: Diglossa
- Species: D. duidae

Binomial name
- Diglossa duidae Chapman, 1929

Species of bird

The scaled flowerpiercer (Diglossa duidae) is a species of bird in the family Thraupidae. It is found in the tepuis of Brazil and Venezuela.

Its natural habitats are subtropical or tropical moist montane forests and subtropical or tropical high-altitude shrubland.
