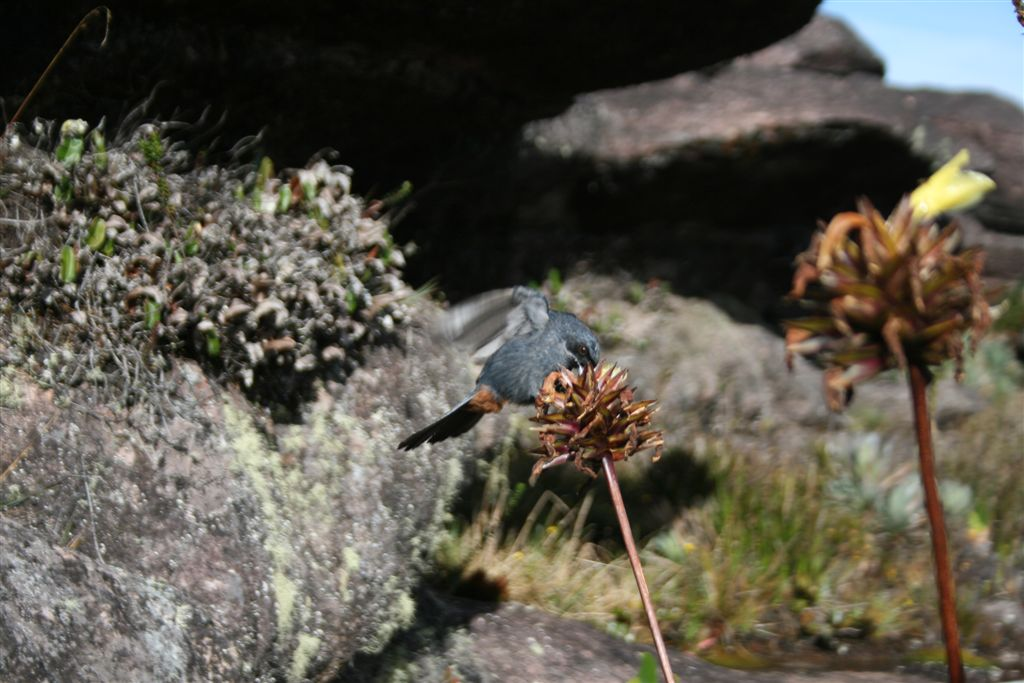
- Feeding from Orectanthe sceptrum

Conservation status
- Least Concern (IUCN 3.1)

Scientific classification
- Kingdom: Animalia
- Phylum: Chordata
- Class: Aves
- Order: Passeriformes
- Family: Thraupidae
- Genus: Diglossa
- Species: D. major

Binomial name
- Diglossa major Cabanis, 1849

= Greater flowerpiercer =

Species of bird

The greater flowerpiercer (Diglossa major) is a species of bird in the family Thraupidae. It is found in the tepuis of western Guyana, eastern Venezuela, and far northern Brazil. Its natural habitats are subtropical or tropical moist montane forests and subtropical or tropical high-altitude shrubland.

== Description ==
The greater flowerpiercer grows to a length of about 16.5 cm (6.5 in) and is larger than any other species in the genus. The adult has a black mask but is otherwise a bluish-slate colour, with a silvery moustachial streak and silvery streaks on the crown and mantle. It has a chestnut crissum (the area around the cloaca). It is unlikely to be confused with related species because no other members of the genus share its range.

== Distribution and habitat ==
The greater flowerpiercer occurs around the tepuis (flat-topped mountains) that are found in the southeastern part of Venezuela and the adjoining areas of northern Brazil and western Guyana. Its altitudinal range is from 1,300 to 2,800 m (4,300 to 9,200 ft), but it is most common above 1,800 m (5,900 ft). It typically occurs in clearings and edges of montane forest, in shrubland, and in stunted woodland.

== Ecology ==
This bird usually forages alone or in pairs, but sometimes joins small mixed species groups. It feeds on insects as well as nectar, which it extracts by probing and piercing flowers. The nest is constructed of grasses and fine twigs and is cup-shaped. It is built among rocks, often under an overhang.

== Status ==
The greater flowerpiercer has a somewhat restricted range. Although the population size has not been quantified, the trend is thought to be downwards because of the gradual decline in the quality of its habitat. The bird is described as being "fairly common but patchily distributed", and the International Union for Conservation of Nature has assessed its conservation status as being of "least concern".
