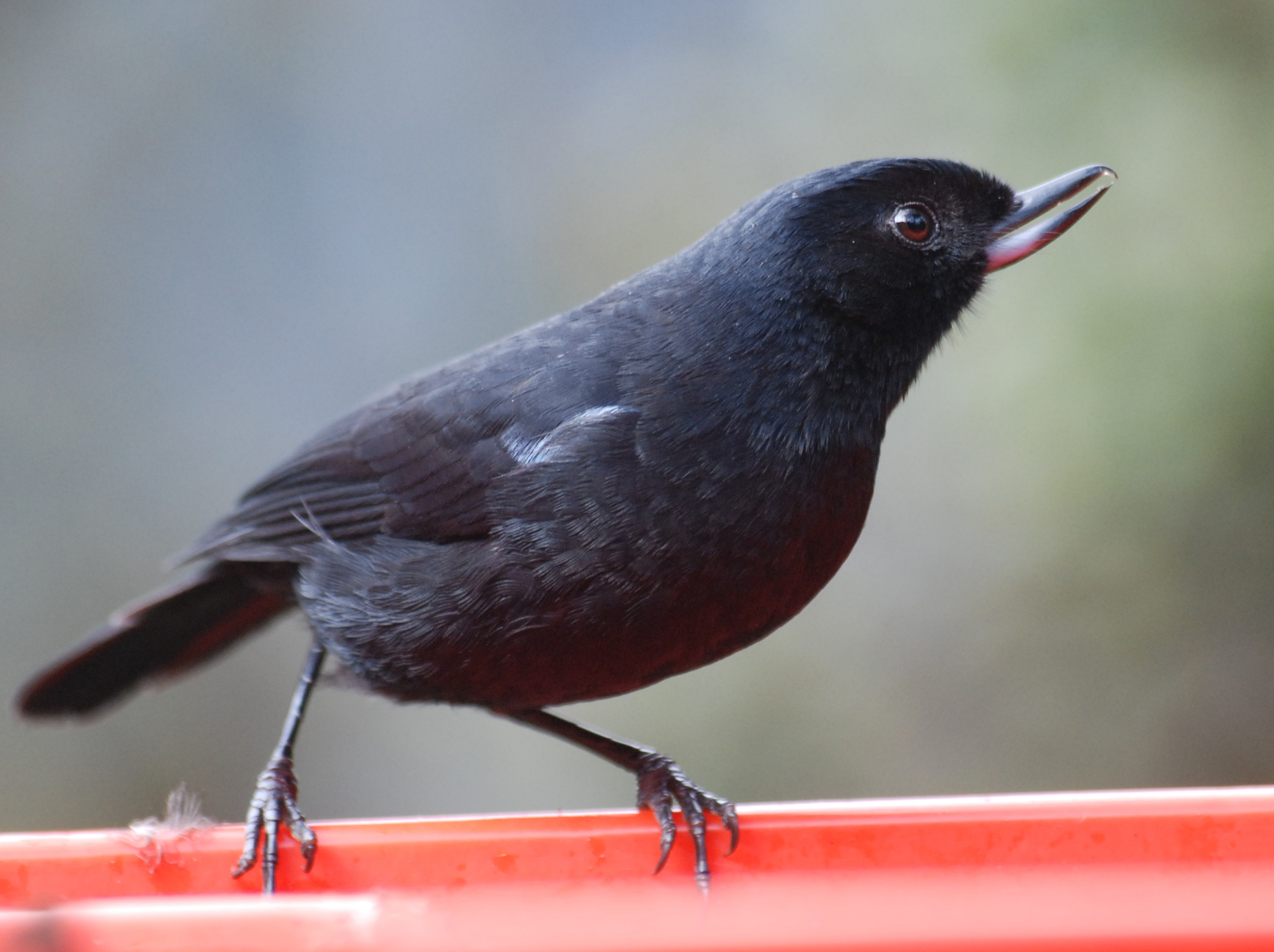
- Glossy flowerpiercer (D. lafresnayii)

Scientific classification
- Kingdom: Animalia
- Phylum: Chordata
- Class: Aves
- Order: Passeriformes
- Family: Thraupidae
- Genus: Diglossa; Wagler, 1832

Type species
- Diglossa baritula Wagler, 1832

Species
- See text

= Flowerpiercer =

Genus of birds

Diglossa is a genus in the family Thraupidae. They are commonly known as flowerpiercers because of their habit of piercing the base of flowers to access nectar that otherwise would be out of reach. This is done with their highly modified bill, which is typically upswept, with a hook at the tip. Most members of the genus Diglossa are found in highlands of South America (especially the Andes), but two species are found in Central America.

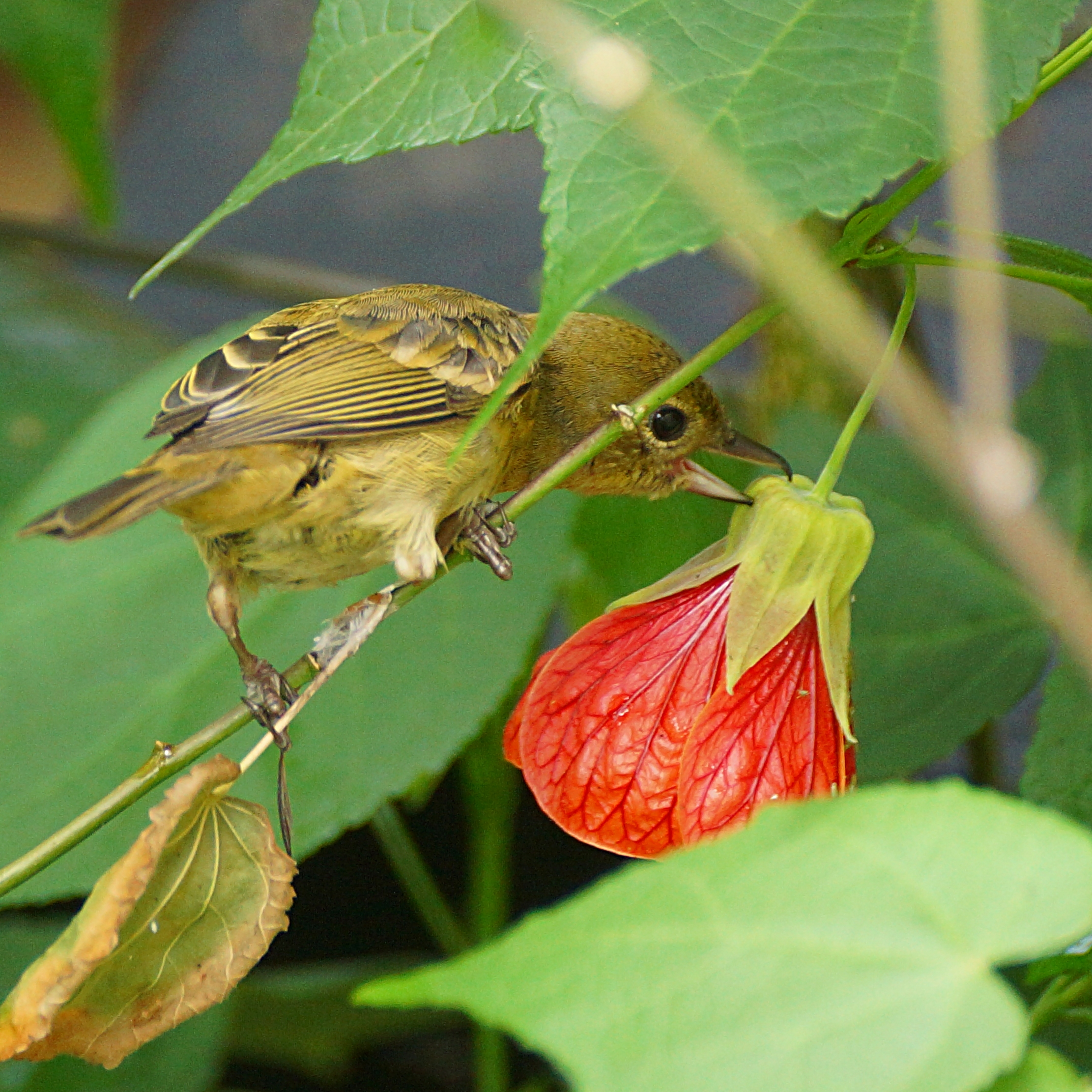
Rusty flowerpiercer, female, piercing the base of an Abutilon flower to access the nectar inside.

== Taxonomy and species list ==
The genus Diglossa was introduced by the German naturalist Johann Georg Wagler in 1832 with the cinnamon-bellied flowerpiercer (Diglossa baritula) as the type species. The genus name is from the Ancient Greek diglōssos meaning "double-tongued" or "speaking two languages".

The genus now includes the following 19 species.

Genus Diglossa – Wagler, 1832 – nineteen species
| Common name | Scientific name and subspecies | Range | Size and ecology | IUCN status and estimated population |
|---|---|---|---|---|
| Golden-eyed flowerpiercer | Diglossa glauca Sclater, PL & Salvin, 1876 | Humid Andean forests of Colombia, Ecuador, Peru and Bolivia | Size: Habitat: Humid Andean forests Diet: | LC |
| Bluish flowerpiercer | Diglossa caerulescens (Sclater, PL, 1856) | Bolivia, Colombia, Ecuador, Peru and Venezuela | Size: Habitat: Humid montane forest Diet: | LC |
| Warbling masked flowerpiercer | Diglossa cyanea (Lafresnaye, 1840) Four subspecies: D. c. obscura (Phelps, WH & Phelps, WH Jr, 1952); D. c. tovarensis (Zimmer, JT & Phelps, WH, 1952); D. c. cyanea (Lafresnaye, 1840); D. c. dispar (Zimmer, JT, 1942) | Andes of Venezuela, Colombia, Ecuador and northern Peru | Size: 15 cm (5.9 in) Habitat: Montane forest, cloud forest, secondary forest, scrubby woodland and forest edges, at 2,000–3,500 m (6,600–11,500 ft) Diet: Insects and fruit, foraging through foliage and probing into flowers with its beak; often in small groups or mixed flocks | LC Stable |
| Whistling masked flowerpiercer | Diglossa melanopis Tschudi, 1844 | Eastern slopes of the Andes in Peru and northern Bolivia | Size: Habitat: Montane evergreen forest, elfin forest, secondary growth and scattered trees and bushes, at 1,450–3,600 m (4,800–11,800 ft) Diet: Forages in the upper levels of the forest, piercing small fruit (especially Melastomataceae) for juice and making short flights to capture flying insects; in mixed-species flocks | NE |
| Indigo flowerpiercer | Diglossa indigotica Sclater, PL, 1856 | Lower west Andean slopes in northern Ecuador and Colombia | Size: Habitat: Humid forest Diet: | LC |
| Rusty flowerpiercer | Diglossa sittoides (D'Orbigny & Lafresnaye, 1838) | Argentina, Bolivia, Colombia, Ecuador, Peru and Venezuela | Size: Habitat: Subtropical or tropical moist montane forests, high-altitude shrubland and heavily degraded former forest Diet: | LC |
| Slaty flowerpiercer | Diglossa plumbea Cabanis, 1861 | Endemic to the Talamancan montane forests | Size: 10 cm (3.9 in); 9 g (0.32 oz) Habitat: Mountain forest canopy and edges, especially sunlit clearings and areas with flowering shrubs, including gardens; also páramo well above the timberline; the lower limit of its breeding range rises from 1,200 m (3,900 ft) in northern Costa Rica to 1,900 m (6,200 ft) in the southern mountains Diet: Pierces the base of flowers of shrubs and epiphytes and extracts nectar with a brush-like tongue; also takes tiny insects from foliage or in flight | LC |
| Cinnamon-bellied flowerpiercer | Diglossa baritula Wagler, 1832 | El Salvador, Guatemala, Honduras and Mexico | Size: Habitat: Subtropical or tropical moist montane forests and heavily degraded former forest Diet: Nectar robber, taking nectar without pollinating the plant | LC |
| Moustached flowerpiercer | Diglossa mystacalis Lafresnaye, 1846 | Bolivia and Peru | Size: Habitat: Subtropical or tropical moist montane forests, high-altitude grassland and heavily degraded former forest Diet: | LC |
| Glossy flowerpiercer | Diglossa lafresnayii (Boissonneau, 1840) | Colombia, Ecuador, Peru and Venezuela | Size: Habitat: Subtropical or tropical moist montane forests, high-altitude grassland and heavily degraded former forest Diet: | LC |
| Chestnut-bellied flowerpiercer | Diglossa gloriosissima Chapman, 1912 Two subspecies: D. g. gloriosissima (Chapman, 1912); D. g. boylei (Graves, 1990) | Endemic to Colombia: a few small, discontiguous locations in the highlands of the Western Andes (Antioquia, Cauca, Chocó and Risaralda departments) | Size: 14–15 cm (5.5–5.9 in) Habitat: Open páramo, shrubby sub-páramo and edges of elfin forest, favouring shrubby Polylepis forests, at 3,000–3,800 m (9,800–12,500 ft), regularly down to 2,400 m (7,900 ft) at Cerro Montezuma Diet: Nectar from flowers (Melastomataceae, Ericaceae, Loranthaceae and epiphytic bromeliads) and probably small insects; visits hummingbird feeders; territorial, pairing only to nest, and seen in family groups of up to five and in mixed flocks | NT Probably fewer than 10,000 mature individuals; habitat gradually decreasing |
| Scaled flowerpiercer | Diglossa duidae Chapman, 1929 | Tepuis of Brazil and Venezuela | Size: Habitat: Subtropical or tropical moist montane forests and high-altitude shrubland Diet: | LC |
| Greater flowerpiercer | Diglossa major Cabanis, 1849 | Tepuis of western Guyana, eastern Venezuela and far northern Brazil | Size: 16.5 cm (6.5 in) Habitat: Clearings and edges of montane forest, shrubland and stunted woodland, at 1,300–2,800 m (4,300–9,200 ft), most common above 1,800 m (5,900 ft) Diet: Insects and nectar, extracted by probing and piercing flowers; usually alone or in pairs, sometimes joining small mixed-species groups | LC Thought to be decreasing, owing to gradual decline in habitat quality; population size not quantified |
| Venezuelan flowerpiercer | Diglossa venezuelensis Chapman, 1925 | Endemic to Venezuela: a few mountain ranges in the northeast (Cordillera de Caripe, Paria Peninsula and Cerro Negro) | Size: 12.7 cm (5.0 in) Habitat: Moist montane forests, secondary forests and scrublands near forests; 1,525–2,450 m (5,000–8,000 ft) on the Turimiquire Massif, 1,675–1,775 m (5,500–5,800 ft) on Cerro Negro, and as low as 885 m (2,900 ft) on the Paria Peninsula, probably seasonally Diet: | EN Decreasing; 670–11,000 adults |
| White-sided flowerpiercer | Diglossa albilatera Lafresnaye, 1843 Four subspecies: D. a. federalis; D. a. albilatera (Lafresnaye, 1843); D. a. schistacea; D. a. affinis | Colombia, Ecuador, Peru and Venezuela | Size: 12.2–13.2 cm (4.8–5.2 in); 9.84–10.2 g (0.35–0.36 oz) Habitat: Subtropical or tropical moist montane forests and heavily degraded former forest Diet: | LC |
| Grey-bellied flowerpiercer | Diglossa carbonaria (D'Orbigny & Lafresnaye, 1838) | Bolivian Andes and far northwestern Argentina | Size: Habitat: Subtropical or tropical moist montane forests, high-altitude shrubland and heavily degraded former forest Diet: | LC |
| Black-throated flowerpiercer | Diglossa brunneiventris Lafresnaye, 1846 | Northern Andes, mainly in Peru but also in Colombia, western Bolivia and far northern Chile | Size: Habitat: Subtropical or tropical moist montane forests, high-altitude shrubland and heavily degraded former forest Diet: | LC |
| Mérida flowerpiercer | Diglossa gloriosa Sclater, PL & Salvin, 1871 | Endemic to Venezuela | Size: Habitat: Subtropical or tropical moist montane forests and high-altitude shrubland Diet: | LC |
| Black flowerpiercer | Diglossa humeralis (Fraser, 1840) Three subspecies: D. h. aterrima; D. h. humeralis (Fraser, 1840); D. h. nocticolor | Colombia, Ecuador, Peru and Venezuela | Size: 13–14 cm (5.1–5.5 in) Habitat: Edges of dense wet forest, also scattered vegetation, shrubby clearings, eucalyptus plantations, parks and gardens; subtropical zone to páramo, at 2,175–4,000 m (7,100–13,100 ft), mostly 2,700–3,400 m (8,900–11,200 ft) Diet: Nectar and small invertebrates; moves quickly, more active in the lower parts of the forest, mainly solitary or in pairs | LC |
