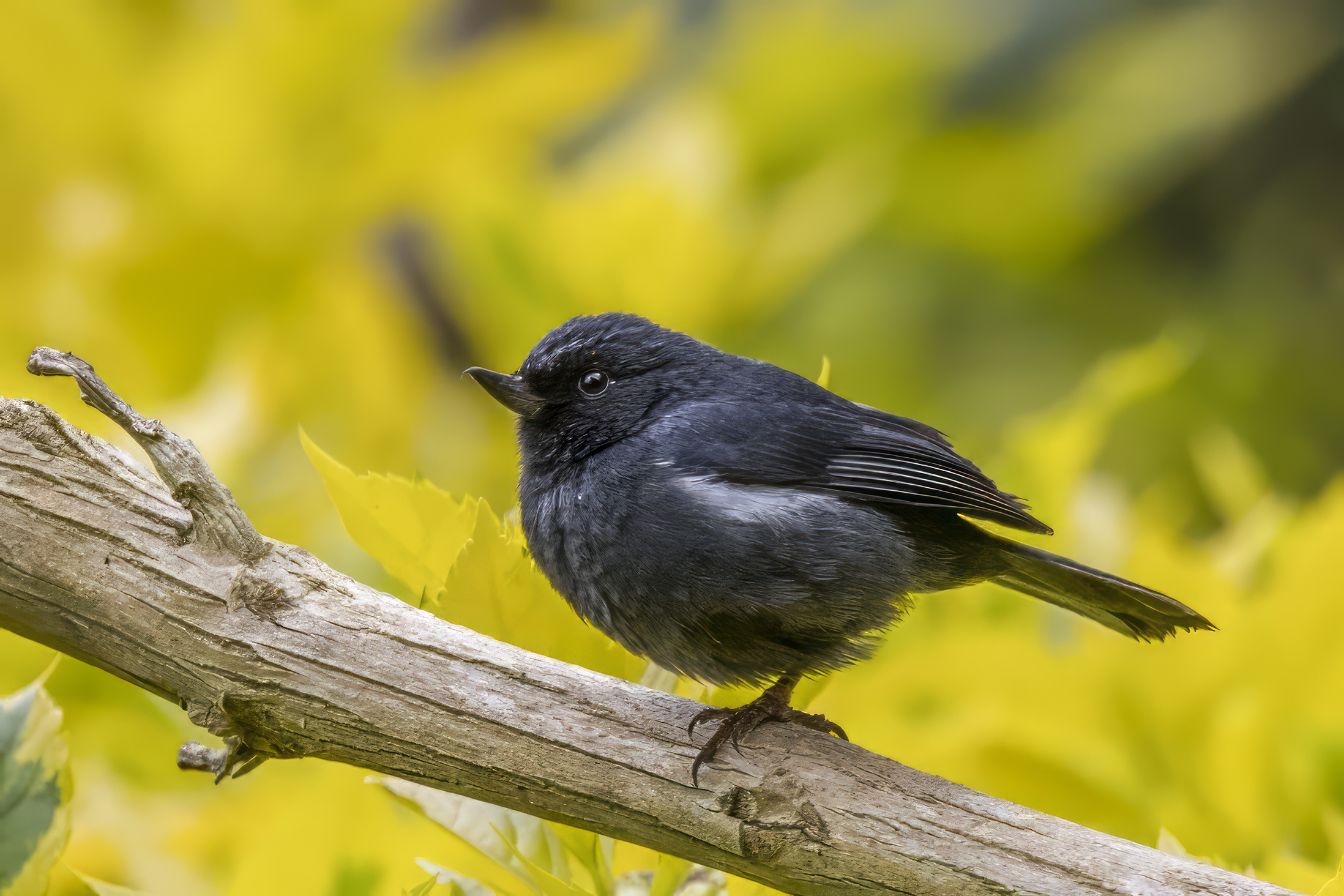
- male Song of White-sided Flowerpiercer

Conservation status
- Least Concern (IUCN 3.1)

Scientific classification
- Kingdom: Animalia
- Phylum: Chordata
- Class: Aves
- Order: Passeriformes
- Family: Thraupidae
- Genus: Diglossa
- Species: D. albilatera

Binomial name
- Diglossa albilatera Lafresnaye, 1843

= White-sided flowerpiercer =

Species of bird

The white-sided flowerpiercer (Diglossa albilatera) is a fairly common and widespread species of flowerpiercer. Flowerpiercers are a genus of birds within the tanager family Thraupidae, with specially adapted bills that enable them to pierce the sides of flower blossoms to access the nectar. The white-sided flowerpiercer is found in Colombia, Ecuador, Peru, and Venezuela. Its natural habitats are subtropical or tropical moist montane forests and heavily degraded former forest.

== Taxonomy and systematics ==
The species was first described as diglossa albi-latera in 1843 by the French ornithologist Frédéric de Lafresnaye.

The generic name Diglossa comes from Ancient Greek diglossos (double-tongued; speaking two languages). The specific epithet albilatera derives from Latin albus (white) and lateralis (flanks).

The IOC recognizes four subspecies:

- D. a. federalis, found along the coastal cordillera of northern Venezuela
- D. a. albilatera (the nominate subspecies), found in the Andes of Venezuela, the Serranía del Perijá on the Colombia-Venezuela border, the Sierra Nevada de Santa Marta of Colombia, and all three ranges of the Andes south to southern Ecuador and probably to northern Peru
- D. a. schistacea, found in extreme southwest Ecuador and northwest Peru west of the Marañón River
- D. a. affinis, found in Peru from the watershed of the Utucamba River in Amazonas, east of the Marañón River, and on the west slope in Ayacucho south to northwest Cuzco

== Description ==
A fairly small flowerpiercer - slightly larger than a black-capped chickadee and slightly smaller than a great tit. Length is 12.2-13.2cm, mass is typically 9.84-10.2g.

The male is a blackish-slate colour overall with the exception of white "sides" (pectoral tufts and underwing linings). On a perched bird these white markings are not always noticeable but when the bird flicks its wings as it frequently does the white flash is obvious. Females are olive-brown above and buffy-brown below, with the same white sides. Both males and females have dark brown irises, bills that are blackish (sometimes paler at the base of the lower mandible), and grey legs.

Immature males resemble females but their plumage is a duller brown with blurred streaks on the breast. Juveniles are dark grey-brown with their dark tipped feathers giving a faintly scaled appearance.

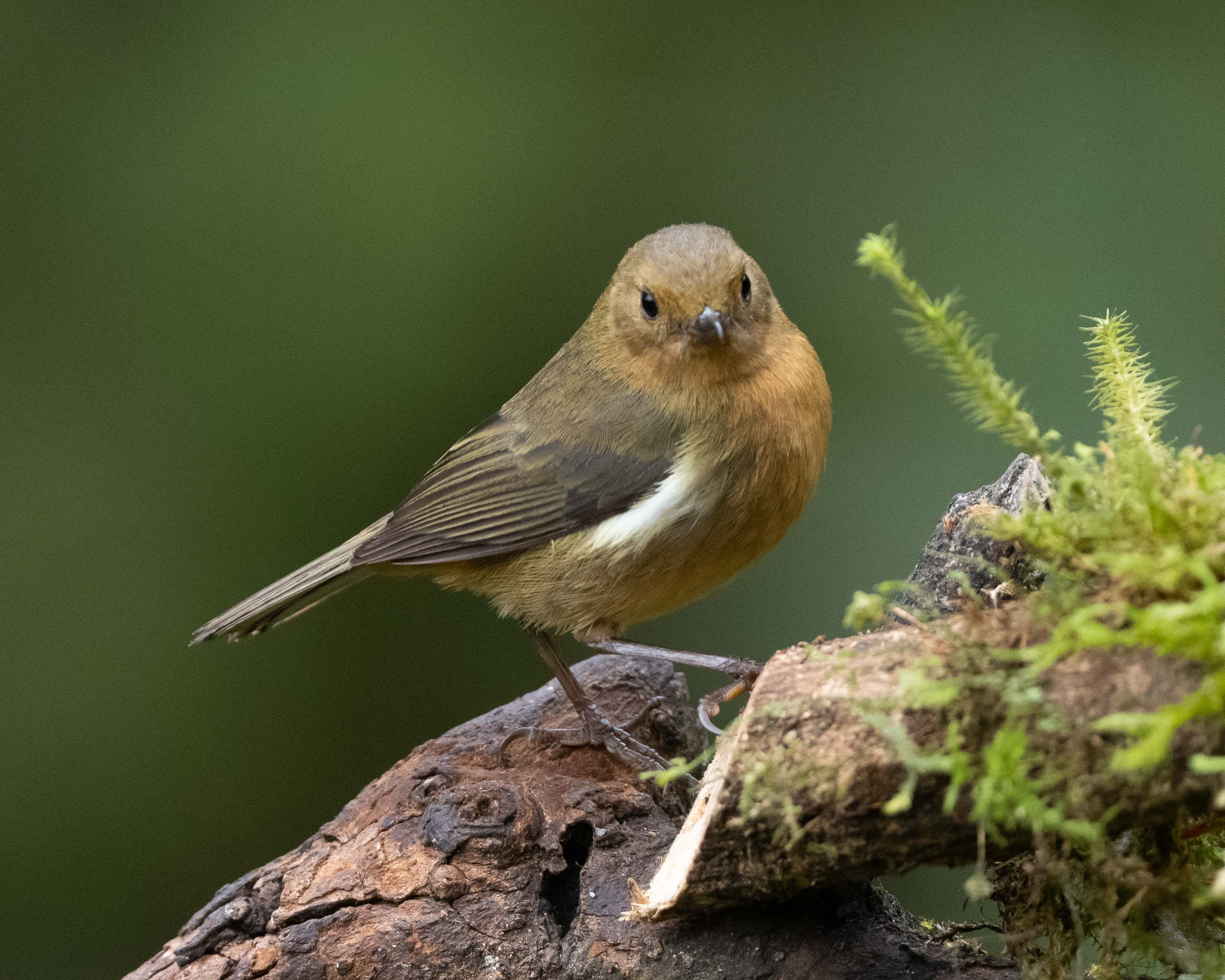
White-sided flowerpiercer (female)

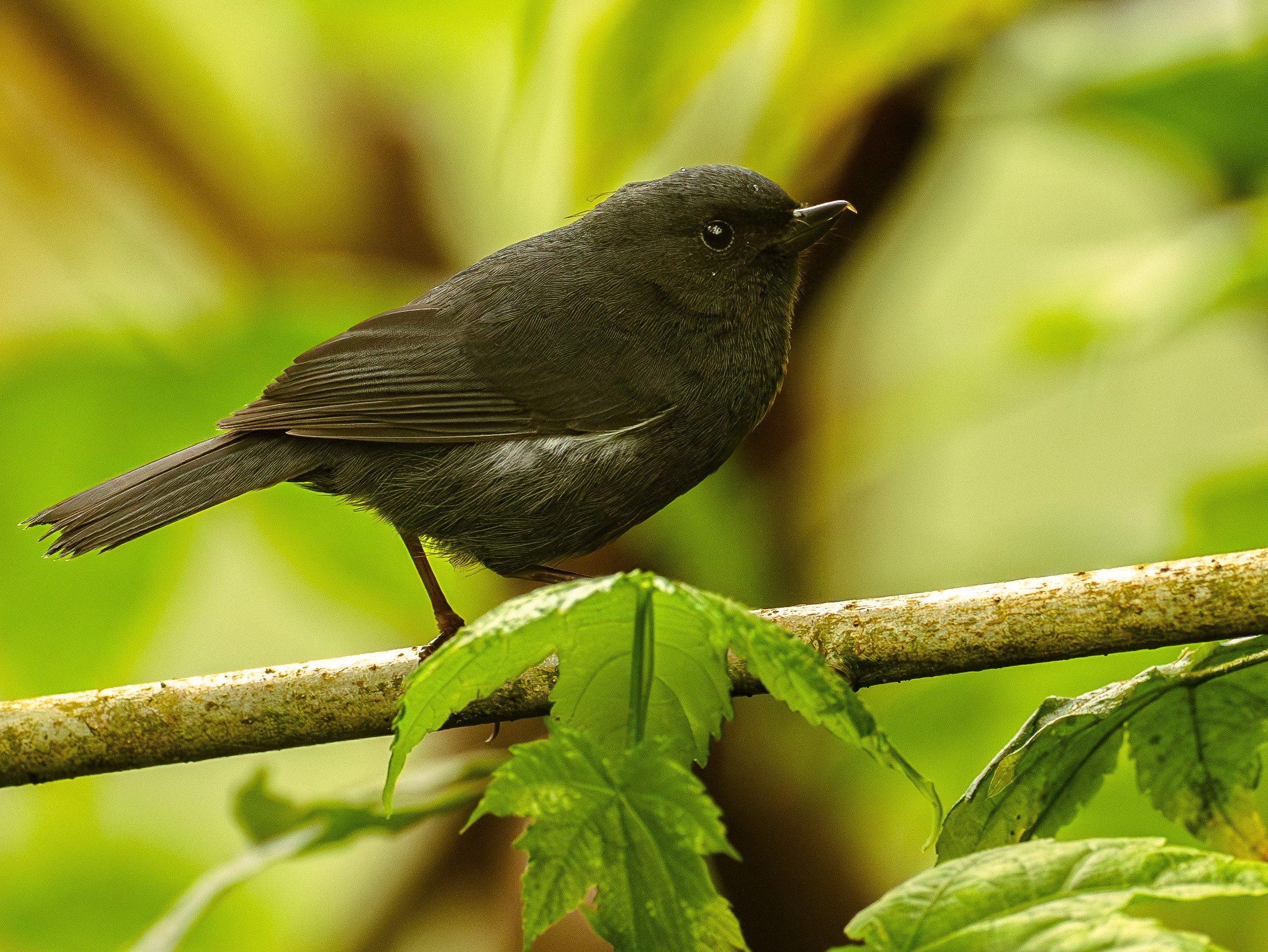
White-sided flowerpiercer (male)

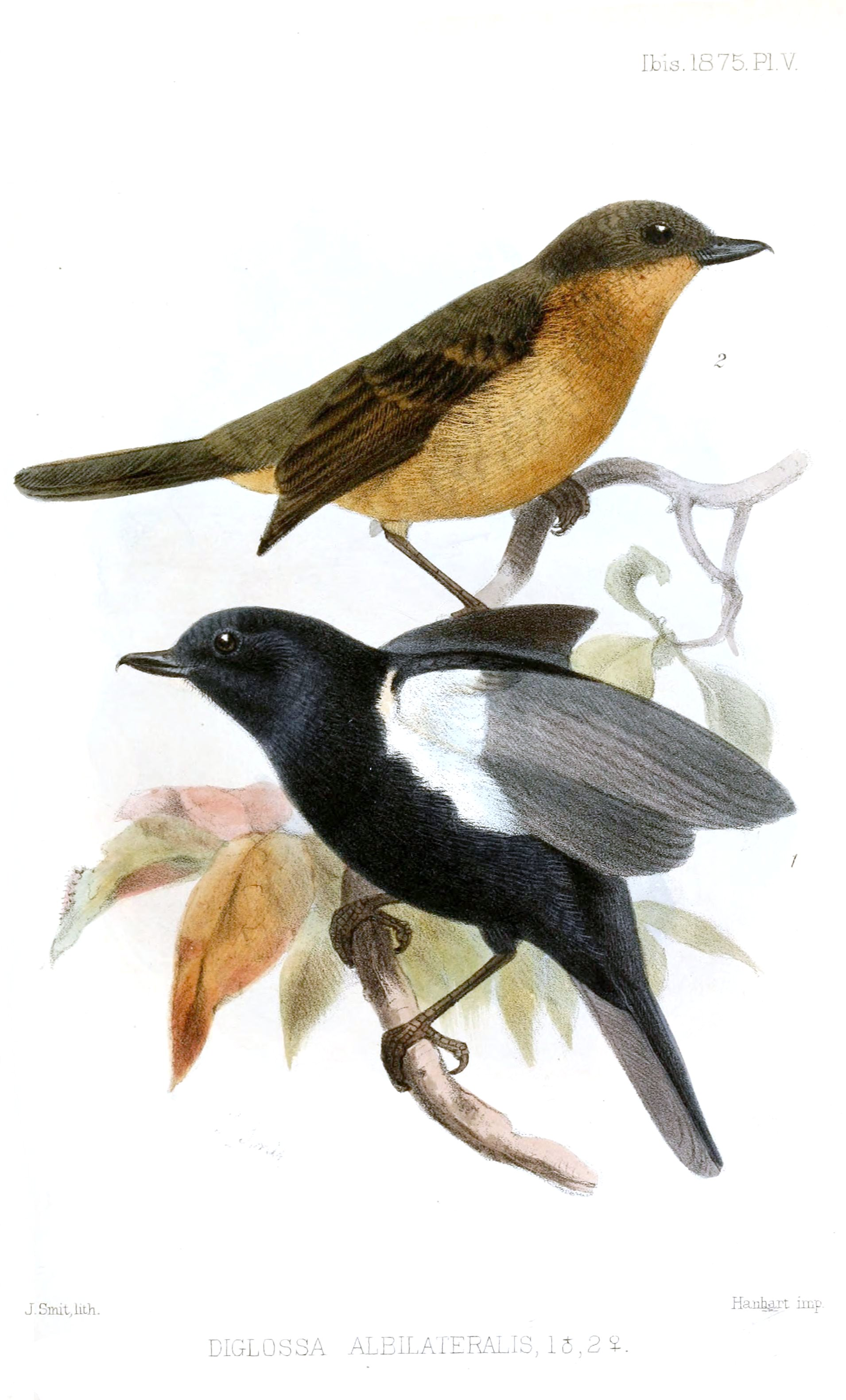
