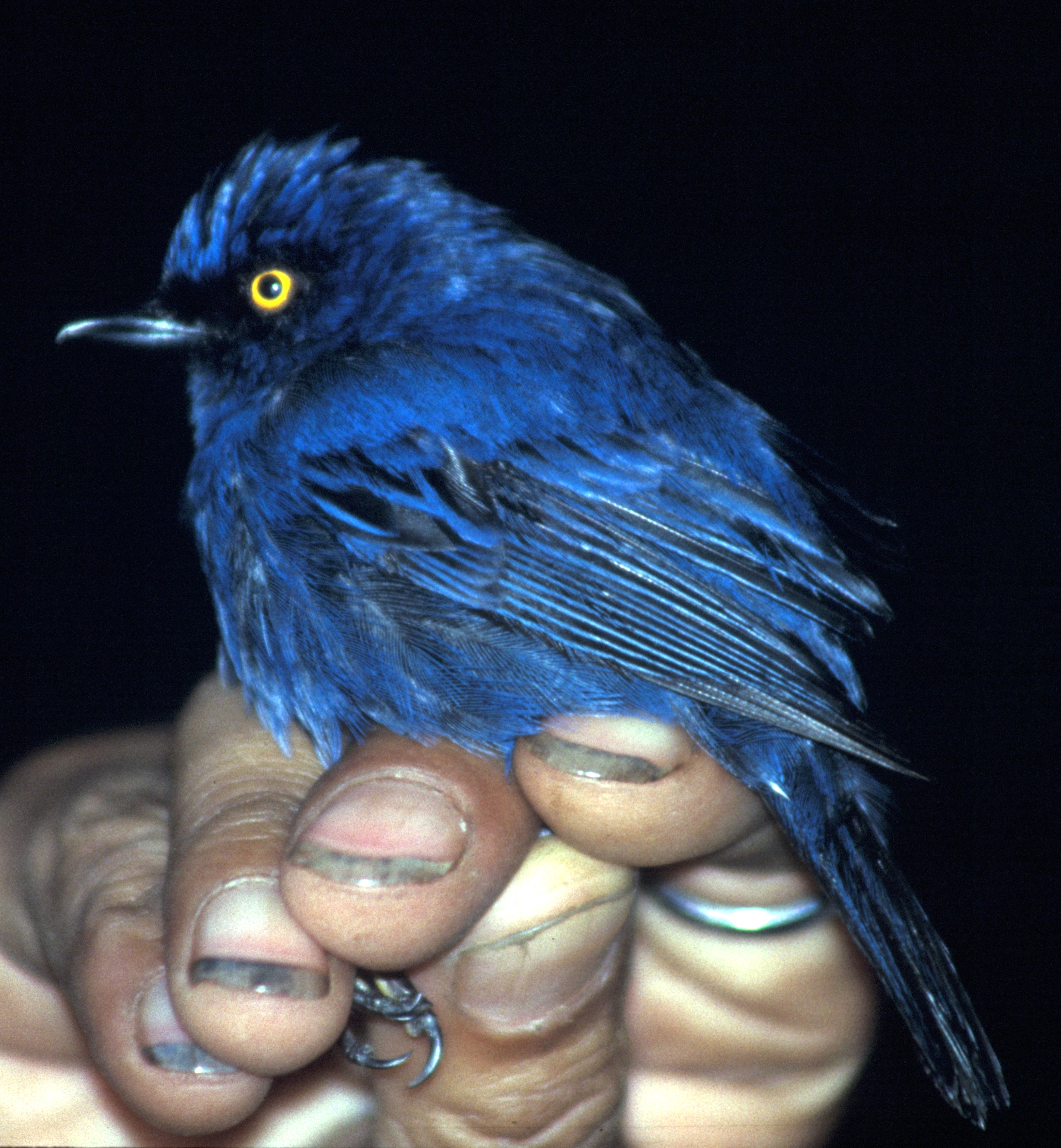

Conservation status
- Least Concern (IUCN 3.1)

Scientific classification
- Kingdom: Animalia
- Phylum: Chordata
- Class: Aves
- Order: Passeriformes
- Family: Thraupidae
- Genus: Diglossa
- Species: D. glauca

Binomial name
- Diglossa glauca Sclater, PL & Salvin, 1876

Synonyms
- Diglossopis glauca

= Golden-eyed flowerpiercer =

Deep-blue flowerpiercer

Species of bird

The golden-eyed flowerpiercer (Diglossa glauca), also known as the deep-blue flowerpiercer, is a species of bird in the tanager family Thraupidae. It is found in humid Andean forests in Colombia, Ecuador, Peru and Bolivia. It is the only species of flowerpiercer with bright yellow eyes.
