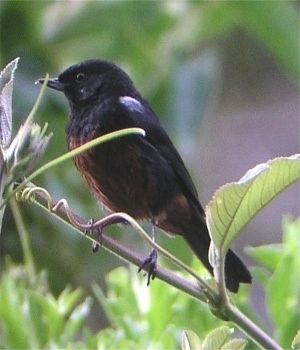

Conservation status
- Least Concern (IUCN 3.1)

Scientific classification
- Kingdom: Animalia
- Phylum: Chordata
- Class: Aves
- Order: Passeriformes
- Family: Thraupidae
- Genus: Diglossa
- Species: D. gloriosa

Binomial name
- Diglossa gloriosa Sclater, PL & Salvin, 1871

= Mérida flowerpiercer =

Species of bird

The Mérida flowerpiercer (Diglossa gloriosa) is a species of bird in the family Thraupidae. It is endemic to Venezuela.

Its natural habitats are subtropical or tropical moist montane forests and subtropical or tropical high-altitude shrubland.
