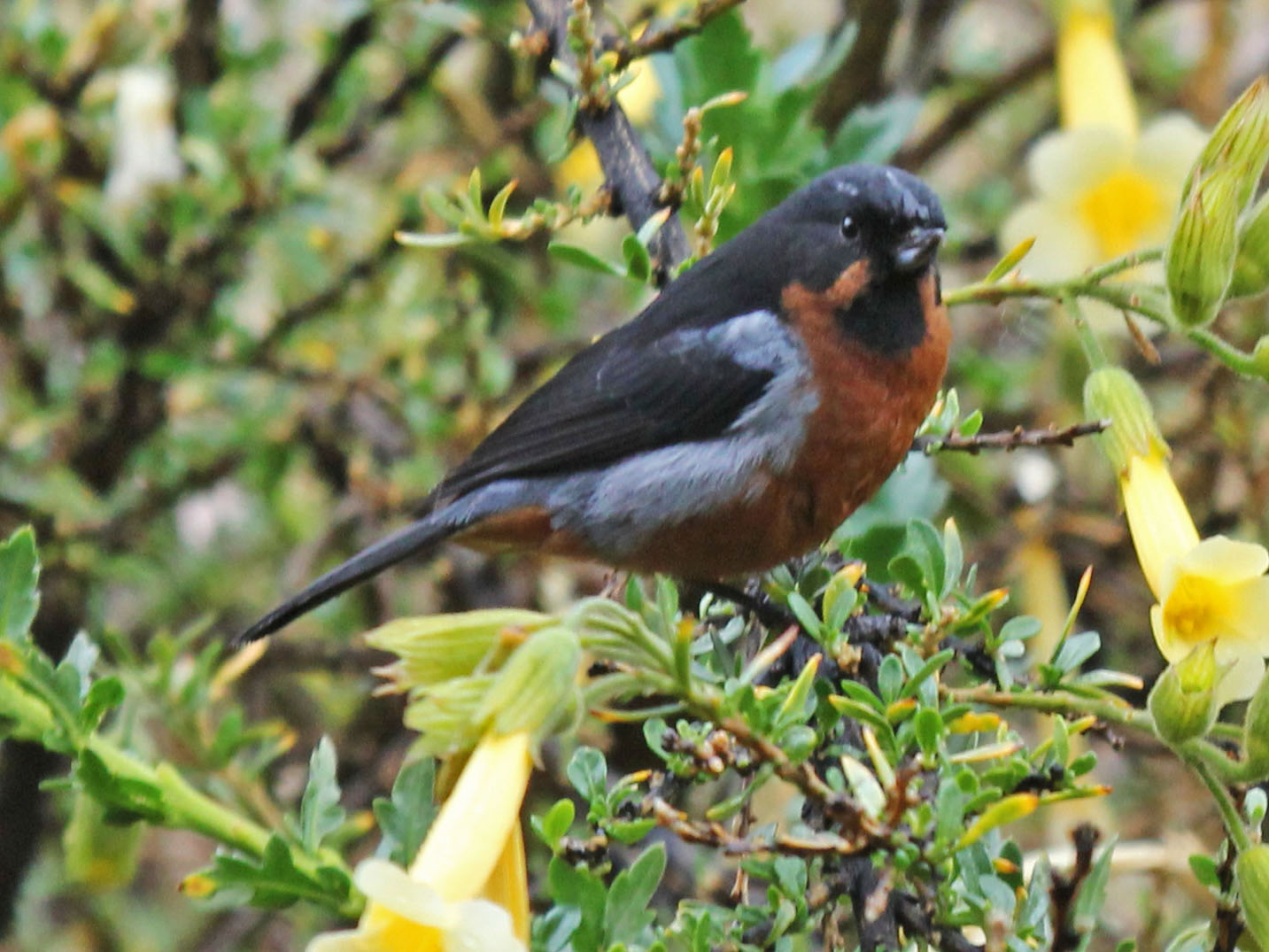

Conservation status
- Least Concern (IUCN 3.1)

Scientific classification
- Kingdom: Animalia
- Phylum: Chordata
- Class: Aves
- Order: Passeriformes
- Family: Thraupidae
- Genus: Diglossa
- Species: D. brunneiventris

Binomial name
- Diglossa brunneiventris Lafresnaye, 1846

= Black-throated flowerpiercer =

Species of bird

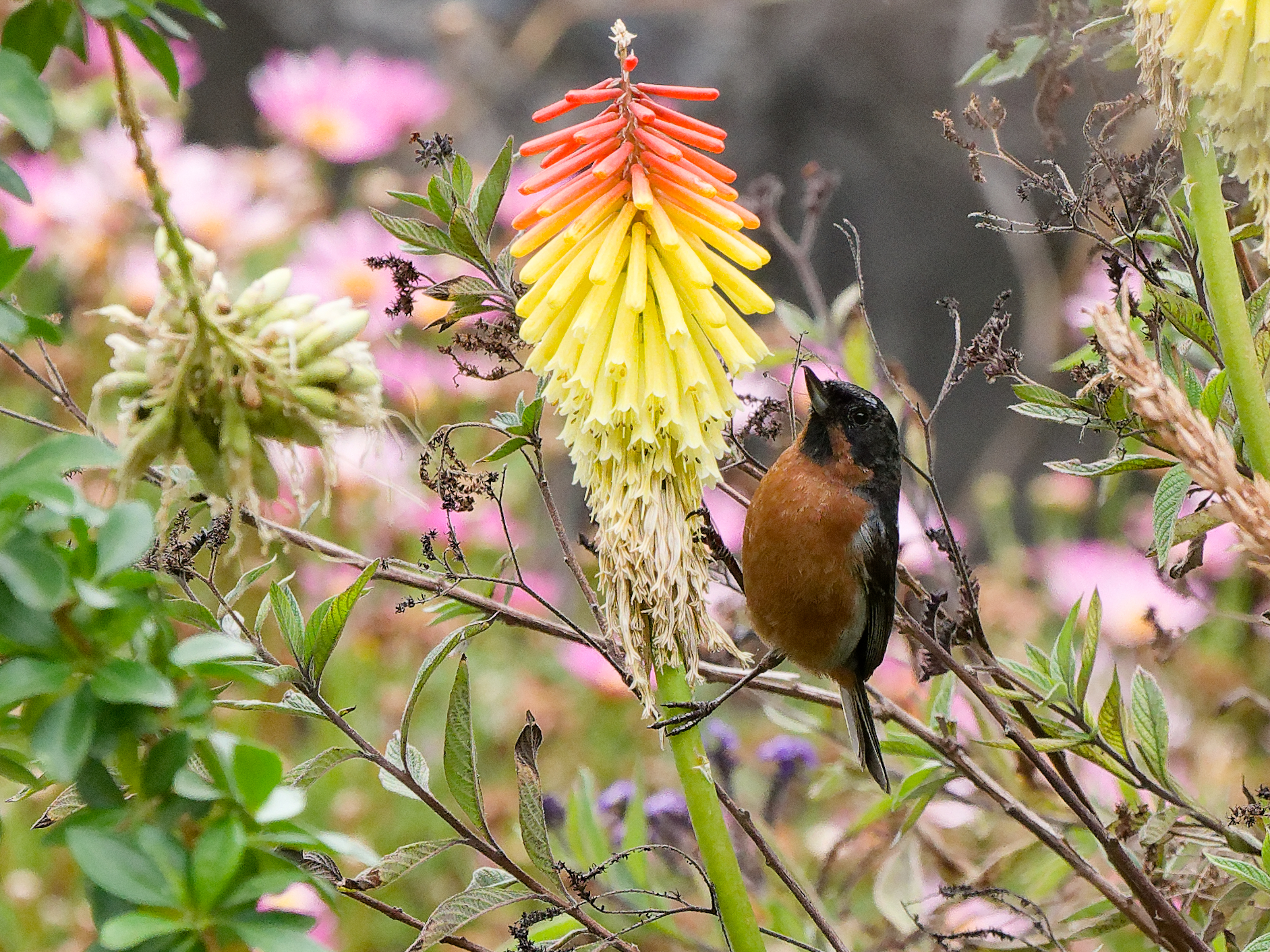
Black-throated Flowerpiercer in Peru

The black-throated flowerpiercer (Diglossa brunneiventris) is a species of bird in the family Thraupidae.

It is found in the northern Andes (mainly in Peru but also in Colombia, western Bolivia and far northern Chile). Its natural habitats are subtropical or tropical moist montane forests, subtropical or tropical high-altitude shrubland, and heavily degraded former forest.

== Gallery ==
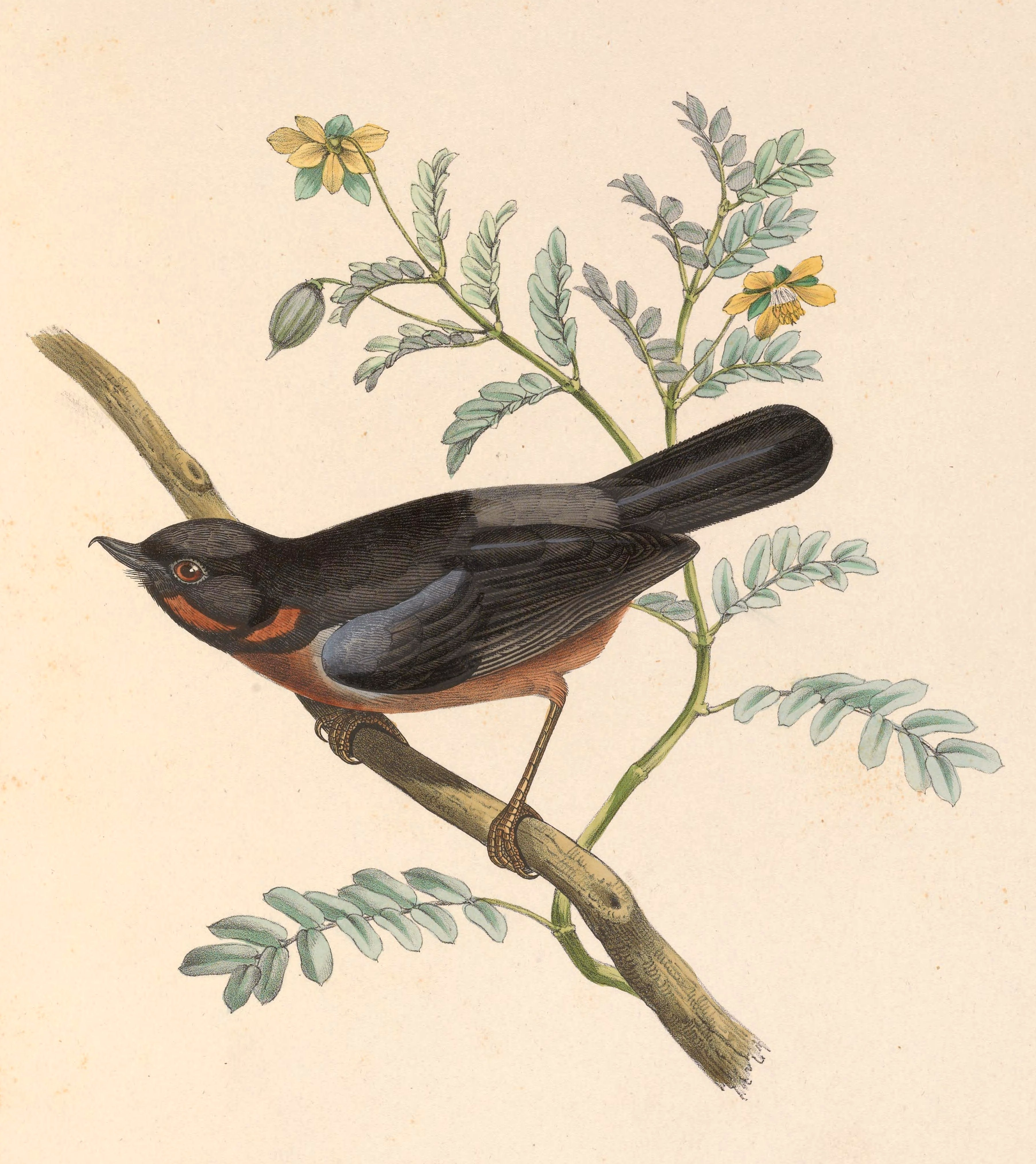
