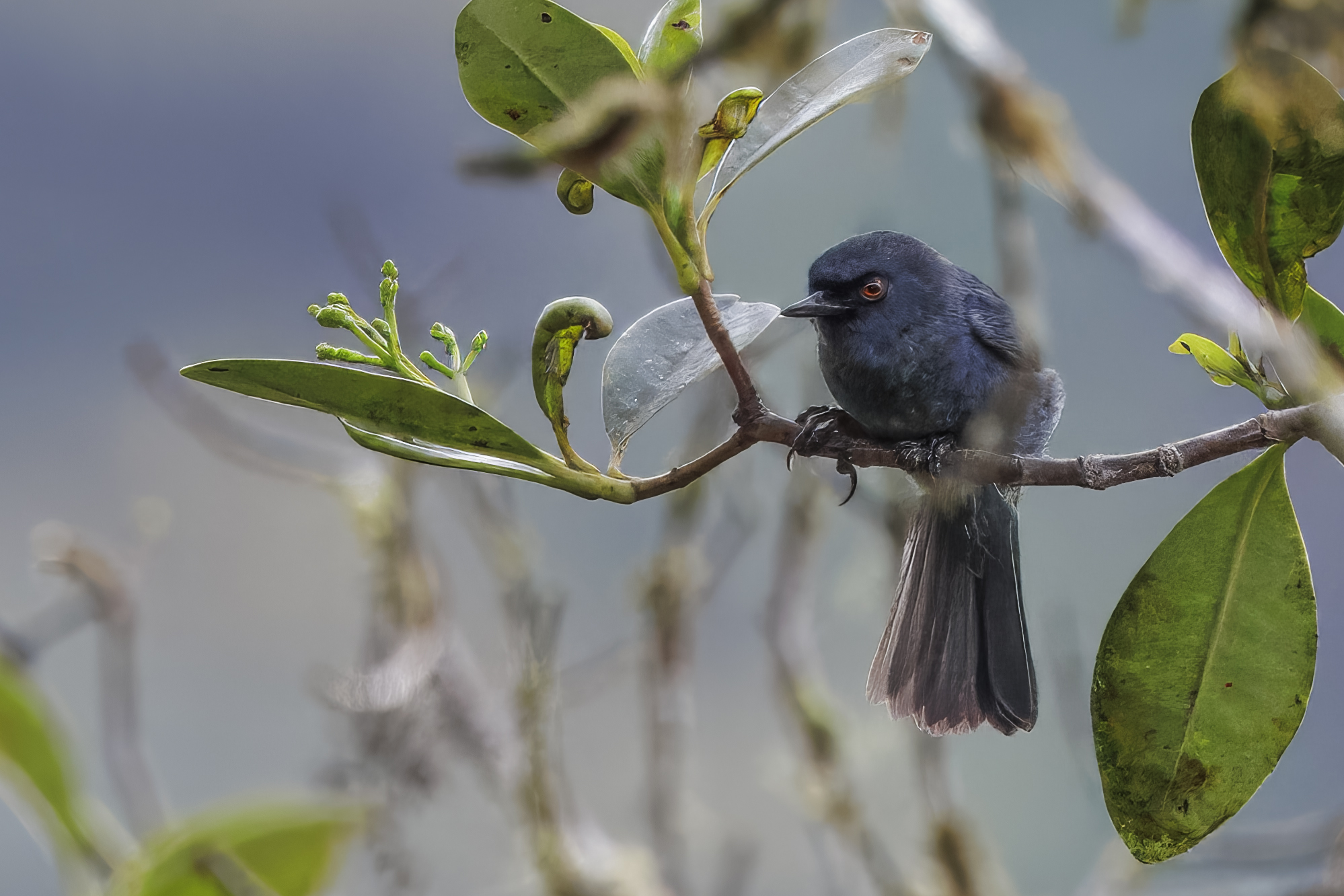
- In Ecuador

Conservation status
- Least Concern (IUCN 3.1)

Scientific classification
- Kingdom: Animalia
- Phylum: Chordata
- Class: Aves
- Order: Passeriformes
- Family: Thraupidae
- Genus: Diglossa
- Species: D. caerulescens

Binomial name
- Diglossa caerulescens (Sclater, PL, 1856)

Synonyms
- Diglossopis caerulescens

= Bluish flowerpiercer =

Species of bird

The bluish flowerpiercer (Diglossa caerulescens) is a species of bird in the family Thraupidae. It is found in humid montane forest in Bolivia, Colombia, Ecuador, Peru and Venezuela.
