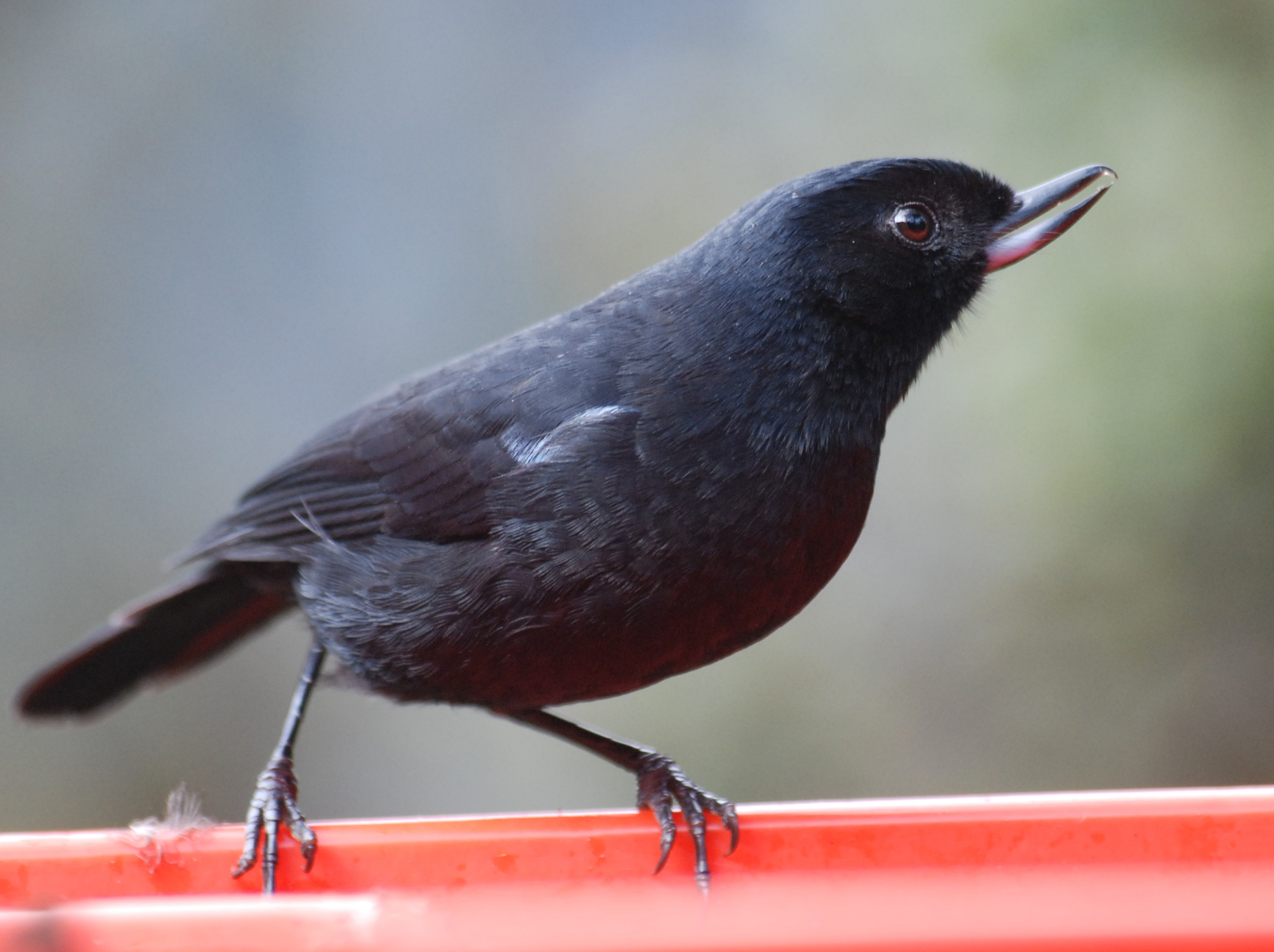
- Diglossa lafresnayii - Glossy Flowerpiercer (song)

Conservation status
- Least Concern (IUCN 3.1)

Scientific classification
- Kingdom: Animalia
- Phylum: Chordata
- Class: Aves
- Order: Passeriformes
- Family: Thraupidae
- Genus: Diglossa
- Species: D. lafresnayii

Binomial name
- Diglossa lafresnayii (Boissonneau, 1840)

= Glossy flowerpiercer =

Species of bird

The glossy flowerpiercer (Diglossa lafresnayii) is a species of bird in the family Thraupidae. It is found in Colombia, Ecuador, Peru, and Venezuela.

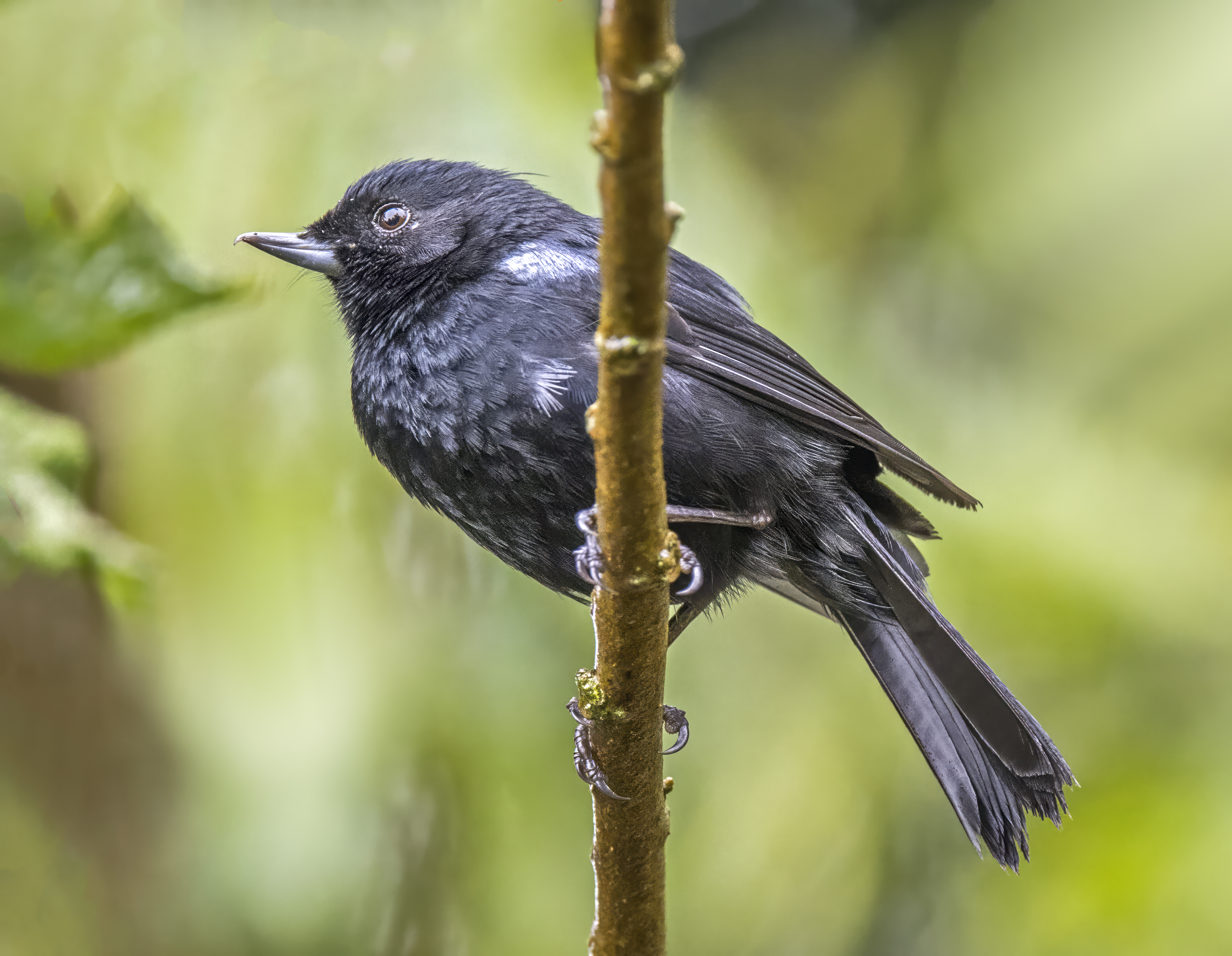
Colombia

Its natural habitats are subtropical or tropical moist montane forests, subtropical or tropical high-altitude grassland, and heavily degraded former forest.
