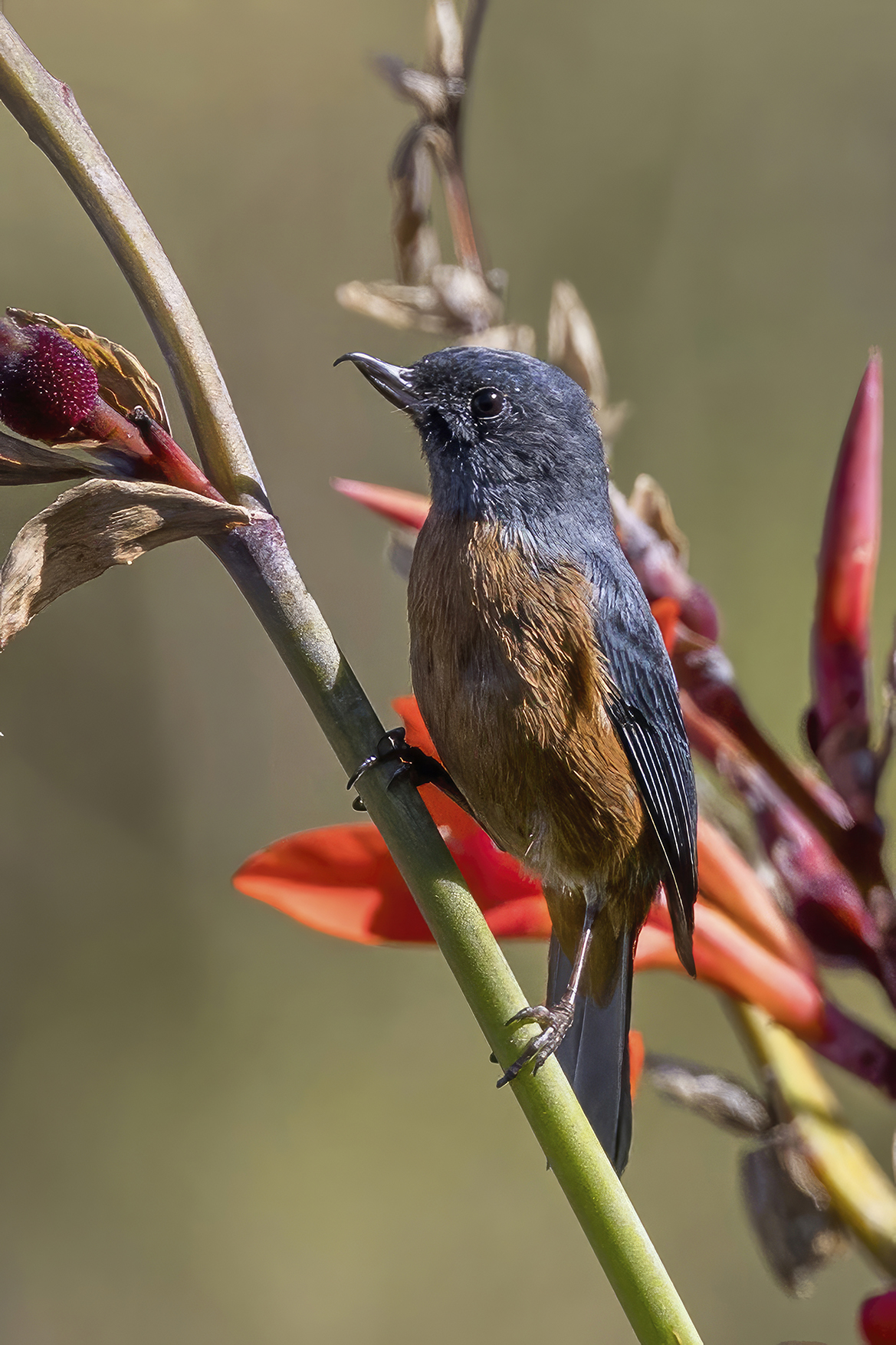
- Male, Antigua Guatemala

Conservation status
- Least Concern (IUCN 3.1)

Scientific classification
- Kingdom: Animalia
- Phylum: Chordata
- Class: Aves
- Order: Passeriformes
- Family: Thraupidae
- Genus: Diglossa
- Species: D. baritula

Binomial name
- Diglossa baritula Wagler, 1832

= Cinnamon-bellied flowerpiercer =

Species of bird

The cinnamon-bellied flowerpiercer (Diglossa baritula) is a species of bird in the family Thraupidae. It is found in El Salvador, Guatemala, Honduras, and Mexico.

Its natural habitats are subtropical or tropical moist montane forests and heavily degraded former forest. It is a species known to be a nectar robber, apparently taking nectar while not pollinating the plant.
