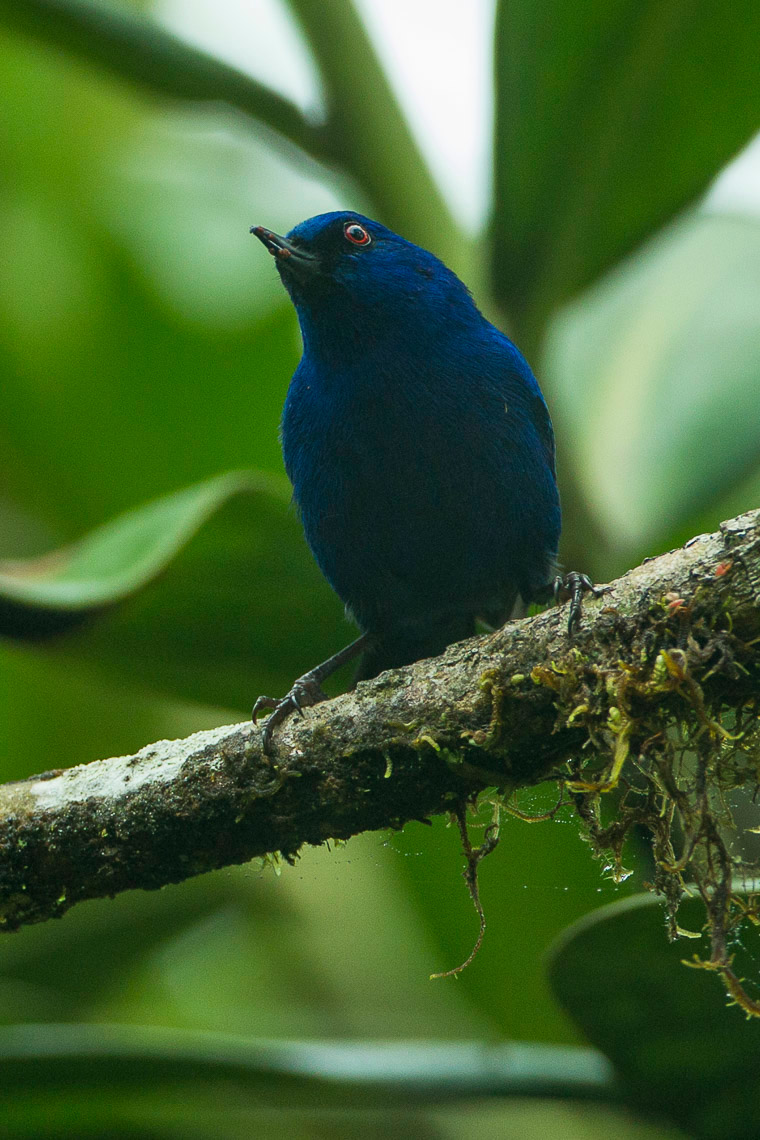

Conservation status
- Least Concern (IUCN 3.1)

Scientific classification
- Kingdom: Animalia
- Phylum: Chordata
- Class: Aves
- Order: Passeriformes
- Family: Thraupidae
- Genus: Diglossa
- Species: D. indigotica

Binomial name
- Diglossa indigotica Sclater, PL, 1856

Synonyms
- Diglossopis indigotica

= Indigo flowerpiercer =

Species of bird

The indigo flowerpiercer (Diglossa indigotica) is a species of bird in the family Thraupidae. It is found in humid forest on the lower west Andean slopes in northern Ecuador and Colombia.
