= List of tanager species =

The International Ornithological Committee (IOC) recognizes these 392 tanager species in family Thraupidae, which are distributed among 107 genera. One species on the list, the St. Kitts bullfinch, is extinct. Confusingly, only 149 of the species are called "tanager"; another 108 are called "finch". This family is found only in the New World, primarily in South and Middle America and the Caribbean, though a few species are occasionally found in the United States. (The 20 species called tanagers in genera Piranga, Habia, and Chlorothraupis are members of another family, Cardinalidae). This list is presented in IOC taxonomic sequence and is also sortable alphabetically by common name, binomial name, status, population (not all are fully assessed), and trends.

== List ==
| Common name | Population | Trend | Status | Binomial name + authority | IOC sequence |
|---|---|---|---|---|---|
| Plushcap | Unknown | ▼ | LC | Catamblyrhynchus diadema Lafresnaye, 1842 | 1 |
| Coal-crested finch | Unknown | ▼ | NT | Charitospiza eucosma Oberholser, 1905 | 2 |
| Brown tanager | Unknown | ▼ | NT | Orchesticus abeillei (Lesson, RP, 1839) | 3 |
| Yellow-shouldered grosbeak | Unknown | ▼ | LC | Parkerthraustes humeralis (Lawrence, 1867) | 4 |
| Hooded tanager | Unknown | Steady | LC | Nemosia pileata (Boddaert, 1783) | 5 |
| Cherry-throated tanager | 30-200 | ▼ | CR | Nemosia rourei Cabanis, 1870 | 6 |
| Blue-backed tanager | Unknown | ▼ | LC | Cyanicterus cyanicterus (Vieillot, 1819) | 7 |
| White-capped tanager | Unknown | ▼ | VU | Sericossypha albocristata (Lafresnaye, 1843) | 8 |
| Scarlet-throated tanager | Unknown | Steady | LC | Compsothraupis loricata (Lichtenstein, MHC, 1819) | 9 |
| Black-masked finch | 6,000-15,000 | ▼ | VU | Coryphaspiza melanotis (Temminck, 1822) | 10 |
| Pampa finch | Unknown | Steady | LC | Embernagra platensis (Gmelin, JF, 1789) | 11 |
| Serra finch | Unknown | ▼ | LC | Embernagra longicauda Strickland, 1844 | 12 |
| Lesser grass-finch | Unknown | Steady | LC | Emberizoides ypiranganus Ihering, HFA & Ihering, R, 1907 | 13 |
| Wedge-tailed grass finch | Unknown | ▼ | LC | Emberizoides herbicola (Vieillot, 1817) | 14 |
| Duida grass finch | Unknown | ? | DD | Emberizoides duidae Chapman, 1929 | 15 |
| Great Inca finch | Unknown | Steady | LC | Incaspiza pulchra (Sclater, PL, 1886) | 16 |
| Rufous-backed Inca finch | Unknown | Steady | LC | Incaspiza personata (Salvin, 1895) | 17 |
| Grey-winged Inca finch | 2,500-9,999 | Steady | LC | Incaspiza ortizi Zimmer, JT, 1952 | 18 |
| Buff-bridled Inca finch | Unknown | ▼ | LC | Incaspiza laeta (Salvin, 1895) | 19 |
| Little Inca finch | 250-999 | ▼ | VU | Incaspiza watkinsi Chapman, 1925 | 20 |
| Mourning sierra finch | | | | Rhopospina fruticeti (Kittlitz, 1833) | 21 |
| Blue finch | | | | Rhopospina caerulescens (Wied-Neuwied, M, 1830) | 22 |
| Band-tailed sierra finch | | | | Rhopospina alaudina (Kittlitz, 1833) | 23 |
| Carbonated sierra finch | | | | Rhopospina carbonaria (d'Orbigny & Lafresnaye, 1837) | 24 |
| Green honeycreeper | | | | Chlorophanes spiza (Linnaeus, 1758) | 25 |
| Golden-collared honeycreeper | | | | Iridophanes pulcherrimus (Sclater, PL, 1853) | 26 |
| Scarlet-and-white tanager | | | | Chrysothlypis salmoni (Sclater, PL, 1886) | 27 |
| Black-and-yellow tanager | | | | Chrysothlypis chrysomelas (Sclater, PL & Salvin, 1869) | 28 |
| Sulphur-rumped tanager | | | | Heterospingus rubrifrons (Lawrence, 1865) | 29 |
| Scarlet-browed tanager | | | | Heterospingus xanthopygius (Sclater, PL, 1855) | 30 |
| Yellow-backed tanager | | | | Hemithraupis flavicollis (Vieillot, 1818) | 31 |
| Guira tanager | | | | Hemithraupis guira (Linnaeus, 1766) | 32 |
| Rufous-headed tanager | | | | Hemithraupis ruficapilla (Vieillot, 1818) | 33 |
| Swallow tanager | | | | Tersina viridis (Illiger, 1811) | 34 |
| Purple honeycreeper | | | | Cyanerpes caeruleus (Linnaeus, 1758) | 35 |
| Red-legged honeycreeper | | | | Cyanerpes cyaneus (Linnaeus, 1766) | 36 |
| Short-billed honeycreeper | | | | Cyanerpes nitidus (Hartlaub, 1847) | 37 |
| Shining honeycreeper | | | | Cyanerpes lucidus (Sclater, PL & Salvin, 1859) | 38 |
| Scarlet-breasted dacnis | | | | Dacnis berlepschi Hartert, EJO, 1900 | 39 |
| Scarlet-thighed dacnis | | | | Dacnis venusta Lawrence, 1862 | 40 |
| Blue dacnis | | | | Dacnis cayana (Linnaeus, 1766) | 41 |
| Yellow-bellied dacnis | | | | Dacnis flaviventer d'Orbigny & Lafresnaye, 1837 | 42 |
| Turquoise dacnis | | | | Dacnis hartlaubi Sclater, PL, 1855 | 43 |
| Black-faced dacnis | | | | Dacnis lineata (Gmelin, JF, 1789) | 44 |
| Yellow-tufted dacnis | | | | Dacnis egregia Sclater, PL, 1855 | 45 |
| Viridian dacnis | | | | Dacnis viguieri Oustalet, 1883 | 46 |
| Black-legged dacnis | | | | Dacnis nigripes Pelzeln, 1856 | 47 |
| White-bellied dacnis | | | | Dacnis albiventris (Sclater, PL, 1852) | 48 |
| Many-colored Chaco finch | | | | Saltatricula multicolor (Burmeister, 1860) | 49 |
| Black-throated saltator | | | | Saltatricula atricollis (Vieillot, 1817) | 50 |
| Orinoco saltator | | | | Saltator orenocensis Lafresnaye, 1846 | 51 |
| Green-winged saltator | | | | Saltator similis d'Orbigny & Lafresnaye, 1837 | 52 |
| Cinnamon-bellied saltator | | | | Saltator grandis (Deppe, 1830) | 53 |
| Olive-grey saltator | | | | Saltator olivascens Cabanis, 1849 | 54 |
| Bluish-grey saltator | | | | Saltator coerulescens Vieillot, 1817 | 55 |
| Streaked saltator | | | | Saltator striatipectus Lafresnaye, 1847 | 56 |
| Lesser Antillean saltator | | | | Saltator albicollis Vieillot, 1817 | 57 |
| Buff-throated saltator | | | | Saltator maximus (Müller, PLS, 1776) | 58 |
| Black-winged saltator | | | | Saltator atripennis Sclater, PL, 1857 | 59 |
| Black-headed saltator | | | | Saltator atriceps (Lesson, RP, 1832) | 60 |
| Black-cowled saltator | | | | Saltator nigriceps (Chapman, 1914) | 61 |
| Black-throated grosbeak | | | | Saltator fuliginosus (Daudin, 1800) | 62 |
| Slate-colored grosbeak | | | | Saltator grossus (Linnaeus, 1766) | 63 |
| Masked saltator | | | | Saltator cinctus Zimmer, JT, 1943 | 64 |
| Thick-billed saltator | | | | Saltator maxillosus Cabanis, 1851 | 65 |
| Golden-billed saltator | | | | Saltator aurantiirostris Vieillot, 1817 | 66 |
| Bananaquit | | | | Coereba flaveola (Linnaeus, 1758) | 67 |
| Yellow-faced grassquit | | | | Tiaris olivaceus (Linnaeus, 1766) | 68 |
| Orangequit | | | | Euneornis campestris (Linnaeus, 1758) | 69 |
| Puerto Rican bullfinch | | | | Melopyrrha portoricensis (Daudin, 1800) | 70 |
| St. Kitts bullfinch | | | | Melopyrrha grandis (Lawrence, 1881) | 71 |
| Greater Antillean bullfinch | | | | Melopyrrha violacea (Linnaeus, 1758) | 72 |
| Cuban bullfinch | | | | Melopyrrha nigra (Linnaeus, 1758) | 73 |
| Grand Cayman bullfinch | | | | Melopyrrha taylori Hartert, EJO, 1896 | 74 |
| Yellow-shouldered grassquit | | | | Loxipasser anoxanthus (Gosse, 1847) | 75 |
| Cuban grassquit | | | | Phonipara canora (Gmelin, JF, 1789) | 76 |
| Barbados bullfinch | | | | Loxigilla barbadensis Cory, 1886 | 77 |
| Lesser Antillean bullfinch | | | | Loxigilla noctis (Linnaeus, 1766) | 78 |
| St. Lucia black finch | | | | Melanospiza richardsoni (Cory, 1886) | 79 |
| Black-faced grassquit | | | | Melanospiza bicolor (Linnaeus, 1766) | 80 |
| Sooty grassquit | | | | Asemospiza fuliginosa (Wied-Neuwied, M, 1830) | 81 |
| Dull-colored grassquit | | | | Asemospiza obscura (d'Orbigny & Lafresnaye, 1837) | 82 |
| Green warbler-finch | | | | Certhidea olivacea Gould, 1837 | 83 |
| Grey warbler-finch | | | | Certhidea fusca Sclater, PL & Salvin, 1870 | 84 |
| Vegetarian finch | | | | Platyspiza crassirostris (Gould, 1837) | 85 |
| Cocos finch | | | | Pinaroloxias inornata (Gould, 1843) | 86 |
| Mangrove finch | | | | Camarhynchus heliobates (Snodgrass & Heller, 1901) | 87 |
| Medium tree finch | | | | Camarhynchus pauper Ridgway, 1890 | 88 |
| Woodpecker finch | | | | Camarhynchus pallidus (Sclater, PL & Salvin, 1870) | 89 |
| Small tree finch | | | | Camarhynchus parvulus (Gould, 1837) | 90 |
| Large tree finch | | | | Camarhynchus psittacula Gould, 1837 | 91 |
| Small ground finch | | | | Geospiza fuliginosa Gould, 1837 | 92 |
| Sharp-beaked ground finch | | | | Geospiza difficilis Sharpe, 1888 | 93 |
| Genovesa ground finch | | | | Geospiza acutirostris Ridgway, 1894 | 94 |
| Vampire ground finch | | | | Geospiza septentrionalis Rothschild & Hartert, EJO, 1899 | 95 |
| Espanola cactus finch | | | | Geospiza conirostris Ridgway, 1890 | 96 |
| Genovesa cactus finch | | | | Geospiza propinqua Ridgway, 1894 | 97 |
| Large ground finch | | | | Geospiza magnirostris Gould, 1837 | 98 |
| Common cactus finch | | | | Geospiza scandens (Gould, 1837) | 99 |
| Medium ground finch | | | | Geospiza fortis Gould, 1837 | 100 |
| Blue-black grassquit | | | | Volatinia jacarina (Linnaeus, 1766) | 101 |
| Black-and-white tanager | | | | Conothraupis speculigera (Gould, 1855) | 102 |
| Cone-billed tanager | | | | Conothraupis mesoleuca (Berlioz, 1939) | 103 |
| Rufous-crested tanager | | | | Creurgops verticalis Sclater, PL, 1858 | 104 |
| Slaty tanager | | | | Creurgops dentatus (Sclater, PL & Salvin, 1876) | 105 |
| Grey-headed tanager | | | | Eucometis penicillata (Spix, 1825) | 106 |
| Black-goggled tanager | | | | Trichothraupis melanops (Vieillot, 1818) | 107 |
| Inti tanager | | | | Heliothraupis oneilli Lane, Aponte, Rheindt, Rosenberg, GH, Schmitt, CJ, & Terrill, 2021 | 108 |
| Flame-crested tanager | | | | Loriotus cristatus (Linnaeus, 1766) | 109 |
| White-shouldered tanager | | | | Loriotus luctuosus (d'Orbigny & Lafresnaye, 1837) | 110 |
| Yellow-crested tanager | | | | Loriotus rufiventer (Spix, 1825) | 111 |
| Grey pileated finch | | | | Coryphospingus pileatus (Wied-Neuwied, M, 1821) | 112 |
| Red pileated finch | | | | Coryphospingus cucullatus (Müller, PLS, 1776) | 113 |
| Fulvous-crested tanager | | | | Tachyphonus surinamus (Linnaeus, 1766) | 114 |
| Tawny-crested tanager | | | | Tachyphonus delatrii Lafresnaye, 1847 | 115 |
| White-lined tanager | | | | Tachyphonus rufus (Boddaert, 1783) | 116 |
| Red-shouldered tanager | | | | Tachyphonus phoenicius Swainson, 1838 | 117 |
| Ruby-crowned tanager | | | | Tachyphonus coronatus (Vieillot, 1822) | 118 |
| Crimson-breasted finch | | | | Rhodospingus cruentus (Lesson, RP, 1844) | 119 |
| White-winged shrike-tanager | | | | Lanio versicolor (d'Orbigny & Lafresnaye, 1837) | 120 |
| Fulvous shrike-tanager | | | | Lanio fulvus (Boddaert, 1783) | 121 |
| Black-throated shrike-tanager | | | | Lanio aurantius Lafresnaye, 1846 | 122 |
| White-throated shrike-tanager | | | | Lanio leucothorax Salvin, 1865 | 123 |
| Crimson-collared tanager | | | | Ramphocelus sanguinolentus (Lesson, RP, 1831) | 124 |
| Flame-rumped tanager | | | | Ramphocelus flammigerus (Jardine & Selby, 1833) | 125 |
| Lemon-rumped tanager | | | | Ramphocelus icteronotus Bonaparte, 1838 | 126 |
| Scarlet-rumped tanager | | | | Ramphocelus passerinii Bonaparte, 1831 | 127 |
| Brazilian tanager | | | | Ramphocelus bresilia (Linnaeus, 1766) | 128 |
| Crimson-backed tanager | | | | Ramphocelus dimidiatus Lafresnaye, 1837 | 129 |
| Masked crimson tanager | | | | Ramphocelus nigrogularis (Spix, 1825) | 130 |
| Huallaga tanager | | | | Ramphocelus melanogaster (Swainson, 1838) | 131 |
| Silver-beaked tanager | | | | Ramphocelus carbo (Pallas, 1764) | 132 |
| Lesson's seedeater | | | | Sporophila bouvronides (Lesson, RP, 1831) | 133 |
| Lined seedeater | | | | Sporophila lineola (Linnaeus, 1758) | 134 |
| Cinnamon-rumped seedeater | | | | Sporophila torqueola (Bonaparte, 1850) | 135 |
| Morelet's seedeater | | | | Sporophila morelleti (Bonaparte, 1850) | 136 |
| Variable seedeater | | | | Sporophila corvina (Sclater, PL, 1860) | 137 |
| Grey seedeater | | | | Sporophila intermedia Cabanis, 1851 | 138 |
| Wing-barred seedeater | | | | Sporophila americana (Gmelin, JF, 1789) | 139 |
| White-naped seedeater | | | | Sporophila fringilloides (Pelzeln, 1870) | 140 |
| Black-and-white seedeater | | | | Sporophila luctuosa (Lafresnaye, 1843) | 141 |
| Double-collared seedeater | | | | Sporophila caerulescens (Vieillot, 1823) | 142 |
| Yellow-bellied seedeater | | | | Sporophila nigricollis (Vieillot, 1823) | 143 |
| Dubois's seedeater | | | | Sporophila ardesiaca (Dubois, AJC, 1894) | 144 |
| Thick-billed seed finch | | | | Sporophila funerea (Sclater, PL, 1860) | 145 |
| Chestnut-bellied seed finch | | | | Sporophila angolensis (Linnaeus, 1766) | 146 |
| Nicaraguan seed finch | | | | Sporophila nuttingi (Ridgway, 1884) | 147 |
| Great-billed seed finch | | | | Sporophila maximiliani (Cabanis, 1851) | 148 |
| Large-billed seed finch | | | | Sporophila crassirostris (Gmelin, JF, 1789) | 149 |
| Black-billed seed finch | | | | Sporophila atrirostris (Sclater, PL & Salvin, 1878) | 150 |
| Slate-colored seedeater | | | | Sporophila schistacea (Lawrence, 1862) | 151 |
| Temminck's seedeater | | | | Sporophila falcirostris (Temminck, 1820) | 152 |
| Buffy-fronted seedeater | | | | Sporophila frontalis (Verreaux, J, 1869) | 153 |
| Plumbeous seedeater | | | | Sporophila plumbea (Wied-Neuwied, M, 1830) | 154 |
| Tropeiro seedeater | | | | Sporophila beltoni Repenning & Fontana, 2013 | 155 |
| Rusty-collared seedeater | | | | Sporophila collaris (Boddaert, 1783) | 156 |
| White-throated seedeater | | | | Sporophila albogularis (Spix, 1825) | 157 |
| White-bellied seedeater | | | | Sporophila leucoptera (Vieillot, 1817) | 158 |
| Parrot-billed seedeater | | | | Sporophila peruviana (Lesson, RP, 1842) | 159 |
| Chestnut-throated seedeater | | | | Sporophila telasco (Lesson, RP, 1828) | 160 |
| Drab seedeater | | | | Sporophila simplex (Taczanowski, 1874) | 161 |
| Chestnut-bellied seedeater | | | | Sporophila castaneiventris Cabanis, 1849 | 162 |
| Ruddy-breasted seedeater | | | | Sporophila minuta (Linnaeus, 1758) | 163 |
| Copper seedeater | | | | Sporophila bouvreuil (Müller, PLS, 1776) | 164 |
| Black-and-tawny seedeater | | | | Sporophila nigrorufa (d'Orbigny & Lafresnaye, 1837) | 165 |
| Tawny-bellied seedeater | | | | Sporophila hypoxantha Cabanis, 1851 | 166 |
| Dark-throated seedeater | | | | Sporophila ruficollis Cabanis, 1851 | 167 |
| Ibera seedeater | | | | Sporophila iberaensis Di Giacomo & Kopuchian, 2016 | 168 |
| Pearly-bellied seedeater | | | | Sporophila pileata (Sclater, PL, 1865) | 169 |
| Rufous-rumped seedeater | | | | Sporophila hypochroma Todd, 1915 | 170 |
| Chestnut seedeater | | | | Sporophila cinnamomea (Lafresnaye, 1839) | 171 |
| Marsh seedeater | | | | Sporophila palustris (Barrows, 1883) | 172 |
| Black-bellied seedeater | | | | Sporophila melanogaster (Pelzeln, 1870) | 173 |
| Cinereous finch | | | | Piezorina cinerea (Lafresnaye, 1843) | 174 |
| Slender-billed finch | | | | Xenospingus concolor (d'Orbigny & Lafresnaye, 1837) | 175 |
| Grey-hooded bush tanager | | | | Cnemoscopus rubrirostris (Lafresnaye, 1840) | 176 |
| Black-headed hemispingus | | | | Pseudospingus verticalis (Lafresnaye, 1840) | 177 |
| Drab hemispingus | | | | Pseudospingus xanthophthalmus (Taczanowski, 1874) | 178 |
| Bolivian warbling finch | | | | Poospiza boliviana Sharpe, 1888 | 179 |
| Cinnamon warbling finch | | | | Poospiza ornata (Landbeck, 1865) | 180 |
| Black-and-rufous warbling finch | | | | Poospiza nigrorufa (d'Orbigny & Lafresnaye, 1837) | 181 |
| Black-and-chestnut warbling finch | | | | Poospiza whitii Sclater, PL, 1883 | 182 |
| Collared warbling finch | | | | Poospiza hispaniolensis Bonaparte, 1850 | 183 |
| Rufous-breasted warbling finch | | | | Poospiza rubecula Salvin, 1895 | 184 |
| Tucuman mountain finch | | | | Poospiza baeri (Oustalet, 1904) | 185 |
| Cochabamba mountain finch | | | | Poospiza garleppi (Berlepsch, 1893) | 186 |
| Slaty-backed hemispingus | | | | Poospiza goeringi (Sclater, PL & Salvin, 1871) | 187 |
| Rufous-browed hemispingus | | | | Poospiza rufosuperciliaris (Blake & Hocking, 1974) | 188 |
| Grey-capped hemispingus | | | | Kleinothraupis reyi (Berlepsch, 1885) | 189 |
| Black-capped hemispingus | | | | Kleinothraupis atropileus (Lafresnaye, 1842) | 190 |
| White-browed hemispingus | | | | Kleinothraupis auricularis (Cabanis, 1873) | 191 |
| Orange-browed hemispingus | | | | Kleinothraupis calophrys (Sclater, PL & Salvin, 1876) | 192 |
| Parodi's hemispingus | | | | Kleinothraupis parodii (Weske & Terborgh, 1974) | 193 |
| Oleaginous hemispingus | | | | Sphenopsis frontalis (Tschudi, 1844) | 194 |
| Black-eared hemispingus | | | | Sphenopsis melanotis (Sclater, PL, 1855) | 195 |
| Western hemispingus | | | | Sphenopsis ochracea (Berlepsch & Taczanowski, 1884) | 196 |
| Piura hemispingus | | | | Sphenopsis piurae (Chapman, 1923) | 197 |
| Fulvous-headed tanager | | | | Thlypopsis fulviceps Cabanis, 1851 | 198 |
| Buff-bellied tanager | | | | Thlypopsis inornata (Taczanowski, 1879) | 199 |
| Orange-headed tanager | | | | Thlypopsis sordida (d'Orbigny & Lafresnaye, 1837) | 200 |
| Chestnut-headed tanager | | | | Thlypopsis pyrrhocoma Burns, KJ, Unitt & Mason, NA, 2016 | 201 |
| Rust-and-yellow tanager | | | | Thlypopsis ruficeps (d'Orbigny & Lafresnaye, 1837) | 202 |
| Superciliaried hemispingus | | | | Thlypopsis superciliaris (Lafresnaye, 1840) | 203 |
| Rufous-chested tanager | | | | Thlypopsis ornata (Sclater, PL, 1859) | 204 |
| Brown-flanked tanager | | | | Thlypopsis pectoralis (Taczanowski, 1884) | 205 |
| Bay-chested warbling finch | | | | Castanozoster thoracicus (Nordmann, 1835) | 206 |
| Long-tailed reed finch | | | | Donacospiza albifrons (Vieillot, 1817) | 207 |
| White-rumped tanager | | | | Cypsnagra hirundinacea (Lesson, RP, 1831) | 208 |
| Rufous-sided warbling finch | | | | Poospizopsis hypocondria (d'Orbigny & Lafresnaye, 1837) | 209 |
| Chestnut-breasted mountain finch | | | | Poospizopsis caesar (Sclater, PL & Salvin, 1869) | 210 |
| Black-backed bush tanager | | | | Urothraupis stolzmanni Taczanowski & Berlepsch, 1885 | 211 |
| Pardusco | | | | Nephelornis oneilli Lowery & Tallman, 1976 | 212 |
| Buff-throated warbling finch | | | | Microspingus lateralis (Nordmann, 1835) | 213 |
| Grey-throated warbling finch | | | | Microspingus cabanisi (Bonaparte, 1850) | 214 |
| Rusty-browed warbling finch | | | | Microspingus erythrophrys (Sclater, PL, 1881) | 215 |
| Plain-tailed warbling finch | | | | Microspingus alticola (Salvin, 1895) | 216 |
| Ringed warbling finch | | | | Microspingus torquatus (d'Orbigny & Lafresnaye, 1837) | 217 |
| Three-striped hemispingus | | | | Microspingus trifasciatus Taczanowski, 1874 | 218 |
| Black-capped warbling finch | | | | Microspingus melanoleucus (d'Orbigny & Lafresnaye, 1837) | 219 |
| Cinereous warbling finch | | | | Microspingus cinereus (Bonaparte, 1850) | 220 |
| Pearly-breasted conebill | | | | Conirostrum margaritae (Holt, EG, 1931) | 221 |
| Bicolored conebill | | | | Conirostrum bicolor (Vieillot, 1809) | 222 |
| Chestnut-vented conebill | | | | Conirostrum speciosum (Temminck, 1824) | 223 |
| White-eared conebill | | | | Conirostrum leucogenys (Lafresnaye, 1852) | 224 |
| Capped conebill | | | | Conirostrum albifrons Lafresnaye, 1842 | 225 |
| Giant conebill | | | | Conirostrum binghami (Chapman, 1919) | 226 |
| Blue-backed conebill | | | | Conirostrum sitticolor Lafresnaye, 1840 | 227 |
| White-browed conebill | | | | Conirostrum ferrugineiventre Sclater, PL, 1855 | 228 |
| Tamarugo conebill | | | | Conirostrum tamarugense Johnson, AW & Millie, 1972 | 229 |
| Rufous-browed conebill | | | | Conirostrum rufum Lafresnaye, 1843 | 230 |
| Cinereous conebill | | | | Conirostrum cinereum d'Orbigny & Lafresnaye, 1838 | 231 |
| Stripe-tailed yellow finch | | | | Sicalis citrina Pelzeln, 1870 | 232 |
| Sulphur-throated finch | | | | Sicalis taczanowskii Sharpe, 1888 | 233 |
| Bright-rumped yellow finch | | | | Sicalis uropigyalis (d'Orbigny & Lafresnaye, 1837) | 234 |
| Saffron finch | | | | Sicalis flaveola (Linnaeus, 1766) | 235 |
| Orange-fronted yellow finch | | | | Sicalis columbiana Cabanis, 1851 | 236 |
| Grassland yellow finch | | | | Sicalis luteola (Sparrman, 1789) | 237 |
| Citron-headed yellow finch | | | | Sicalis luteocephala (d'Orbigny & Lafresnaye, 1837) | 238 |
| Patagonian yellow finch | | | | Sicalis lebruni (Oustalet, 1891) | 239 |
| Greenish yellow finch | | | | Sicalis olivascens (d'Orbigny & Lafresnaye, 1837) | 240 |
| Monte yellow finch | | | | Sicalis mendozae (Sharpe, 1888) | 241 |
| Greater yellow finch | | | | Sicalis auriventris Philippi & Landbeck, 1864 | 242 |
| Raimondi's yellow finch | | | | Sicalis raimondii Taczanowski, 1874 | 243 |
| Puna yellow finch | | | | Sicalis lutea (d'Orbigny & Lafresnaye, 1837) | 244 |
| Grey-hooded sierra finch | | | | Phrygilus gayi (Gervais, 1834) | 245 |
| Patagonian sierra finch | | | | Phrygilus patagonicus Lowe, 1923 | 246 |
| Black-hooded sierra finch | | | | Phrygilus atriceps (d'Orbigny & Lafresnaye, 1837) | 247 |
| Peruvian sierra finch | | | | Phrygilus punensis Ridgway, 1887 | 248 |
| Inaccessible Island finch | | | | Nesospiza acunhae Cabanis, 1873 | 249 |
| Wilkins's finch | | | | Nesospiza wilkinsi Lowe, 1923 | 250 |
| Nightingale Island finch | | | | Nesospiza questi Lowe, 1923 | 251 |
| Gough finch | | | | Rowettia goughensis (Clarke, WE, 1904) | 252 |
| White-bridled finch | | | | Melanodera melanodera (Quoy & Gaimard, 1824) | 253 |
| Yellow-bridled finch | | | | Melanodera xanthogramma (Gould & Gray, GR, 1839) | 254 |
| Ash-breasted sierra finch | | | | Geospizopsis plebejus (Tschudi, 1844) | 255 |
| Plumbeous sierra finch | | | | Geospizopsis unicolor (d'Orbigny & Lafresnaye, 1837) | 256 |
| Uniform finch | | | | Haplospiza unicolor Cabanis, 1851 | 257 |
| Slaty finch | | | | Haplospiza rustica (Tschudi, 1844) | 258 |
| Peg-billed finch | | | | Acanthidops bairdi Ridgway, 1882 | 259 |
| Streaked dacnis | | | | Xenodacnis petersi Bond, J & Meyer de Schauensee, 1939 | 260 |
| Tit-like dacnis | | | | Xenodacnis parina Cabanis, 1873 | 261 |
| Red-backed sierra finch | | | | Idiopsar dorsalis (Cabanis, 1883) | 262 |
| White-throated sierra finch | | | | Idiopsar erythronotus (Philippi & Landbeck, 1861) | 263 |
| Glacier finch | | | | Idiopsar speculifer (d'Orbigny & Lafresnaye, 1837) | 264 |
| Boulder finch | | | | Idiopsar brachyurus Cassin, 1867 | 265 |
| Band-tailed seedeater | | | | Catamenia analis (d'Orbigny & Lafresnaye, 1837) | 266 |
| Plain-colored seedeater | | | | Catamenia inornata (Lafresnaye, 1847) | 267 |
| Paramo seedeater | | | | Catamenia homochroa Sclater, PL, 1859 | 268 |
| Golden-eyed flowerpiercer | | | | Diglossa glauca Sclater, PL & Salvin, 1876 | 269 |
| Bluish flowerpiercer | | | | Diglossa caerulescens (Sclater, PL, 1856) | 270 |
| Masked flowerpiercer | | | | Diglossa cyanea (Lafresnaye, 1840) | 271 |
| Indigo flowerpiercer | | | | Diglossa indigotica Sclater, PL, 1856 | 272 |
| Rusty flowerpiercer | | | | Diglossa sittoides (d'Orbigny & Lafresnaye, 1838) | 273 |
| Slaty flowerpiercer | | | | Diglossa plumbea Cabanis, 1861 | 274 |
| Cinnamon-bellied flowerpiercer | | | | Diglossa baritula Wagler, 1832 | 275 |
| Moustached flowerpiercer | | | | Diglossa mystacalis Lafresnaye, 1846 | 276 |
| Glossy flowerpiercer | | | | Diglossa lafresnayii (Boissonneau, 1840) | 277 |
| Chestnut-bellied flowerpiercer | | | | Diglossa gloriosissima Chapman, 1912 | 278 |
| Scaled flowerpiercer | | | | Diglossa duidae Chapman, 1929 | 279 |
| Greater flowerpiercer | | | | Diglossa major Cabanis, 1849 | 280 |
| Venezuelan flowerpiercer | | | | Diglossa venezuelensis Chapman, 1925 | 281 |
| White-sided flowerpiercer | | | | Diglossa albilatera Lafresnaye, 1843 | 282 |
| Grey-bellied flowerpiercer | | | | Diglossa carbonaria (d'Orbigny & Lafresnaye, 1838) | 283 |
| Black-throated flowerpiercer | | | | Diglossa brunneiventris Lafresnaye, 1846 | 284 |
| Merida flowerpiercer | | | | Diglossa gloriosa Sclater, PL & Salvin, 1871 | 285 |
| Black flowerpiercer | | | | Diglossa humeralis (Fraser, 1840) | 286 |
| Vermilion tanager | | | | Calochaetes coccineus (Sclater, PL, 1858) | 287 |
| Purplish-mantled tanager | | | | Iridosornis porphyrocephalus Sclater, PL, 1856 | 288 |
| Yellow-throated tanager | | | | Iridosornis analis (Tschudi, 1844) | 289 |
| Golden-collared tanager | | | | Iridosornis jelskii Cabanis, 1873 | 290 |
| Yellow-scarfed tanager | | | | Iridosornis reinhardti Sclater, PL, 1865 | 291 |
| Golden-crowned tanager | | | | Iridosornis rufivertex (Lafresnaye, 1842) | 292 |
| Fawn-breasted tanager | | | | Pipraeidea melanonota (Vieillot, 1819) | 293 |
| Blue-and-yellow tanager | | | | Rauenia bonariensis (Gmelin, JF, 1789) | 294 |
| Rufous-bellied mountain tanager | | | | Pseudosaltator rufiventris (d'Orbigny & Lafresnaye, 1837) | 295 |
| Carriker's mountain tanager | | | | Dubusia carrikeri Wetmore, 1946 | 296 |
| Buff-breasted mountain tanager | | | | Dubusia taeniata (Boissonneau, 1840) | 297 |
| Streak-crowned mountain tanager | | | | Dubusia stictocephala Berlepsch & Stolzmann, 1894 | 298 |
| Chestnut-bellied mountain tanager | | | | Dubusia castaneoventris (Sclater, PL, 1851) | 299 |
| Hooded mountain tanager | | | | Buthraupis montana (d'Orbigny & Lafresnaye, 1837) | 300 |
| Blue-capped tanager | | | | Sporathraupis cyanocephala (d'Orbigny & Lafresnaye, 1837) | 301 |
| Masked mountain tanager | | | | Tephrophilus wetmorei Moore, RT, 1934 | 302 |
| Grass-green tanager | | | | Chlorornis riefferii (Boissonneau, 1840) | 303 |
| Black-chested mountain tanager | | | | Cnemathraupis eximia (Boissonneau, 1840) | 304 |
| Golden-backed mountain tanager | | | | Cnemathraupis aureodorsalis (Blake & Hocking, 1974) | 305 |
| Blue-winged mountain tanager | | | | Anisognathus somptuosus (Lesson, RP, 1831) | 306 |
| Black-chinned mountain tanager | | | | Anisognathus notabilis (Sclater, PL, 1855) | 307 |
| Santa Marta mountain tanager | | | | Anisognathus melanogenys (Salvin & Godman, 1880) | 308 |
| Scarlet-bellied mountain tanager | | | | Anisognathus igniventris (d'Orbigny & Lafresnaye, 1837) | 309 |
| Lacrimose mountain tanager | | | | Anisognathus lacrymosus (Du Bus de Gisignies, 1846) | 310 |
| Glistening-green tanager | | | | Chlorochrysa phoenicotis (Bonaparte, 1851) | 311 |
| Multicolored tanager | | | | Chlorochrysa nitidissima Sclater, PL, 1874 | 312 |
| Orange-eared tanager | | | | Chlorochrysa calliparaea (Tschudi, 1844) | 313 |
| Orange-throated tanager | | | | Wetmorethraupis sterrhopteron Lowery & O'Neill, 1964 | 314 |
| Yellow-green tanager | | | | Bangsia flavovirens (Lawrence, 1867) | 315 |
| Blue-and-gold tanager | | | | Bangsia arcaei (Sclater, PL & Salvin, 1869) | 316 |
| Gold-ringed tanager | | | | Bangsia aureocincta (Hellmayr, 1910) | 317 |
| Moss-backed tanager | | | | Bangsia edwardsi (Elliot, DG, 1865) | 318 |
| Golden-chested tanager | | | | Bangsia rothschildi (Berlepsch, 1897) | 319 |
| Black-and-gold tanager | | | | Bangsia melanochlamys (Hellmayr, 1910) | 320 |
| Grey-crested finch | | | | Lophospingus griseocristatus (d'Orbigny & Lafresnaye, 1837) | 321 |
| Black-crested finch | | | | Lophospingus pusillus (Burmeister, 1860) | 322 |
| Shrike-like tanager | | | | Neothraupis fasciata (Lichtenstein, MHC, 1823) | 323 |
| Diuca finch | | | | Diuca diuca (Molina, 1782) | 324 |
| Yellow cardinal | | | | Gubernatrix cristata (Vieillot, 1817) | 325 |
| Diademed tanager | | | | Stephanophorus diadematus (Temminck, 1823) | 326 |
| Magpie tanager | | | | Cissopis leverianus (Gmelin, JF, 1788) | 327 |
| Black-faced tanager | | | | Schistochlamys melanopis (Latham, 1790) | 328 |
| Cinnamon tanager | | | | Schistochlamys ruficapillus (Vieillot, 1817) | 329 |
| Red-crested cardinal | | | | Paroaria coronata (Miller, JF, 1776) | 330 |
| Red-cowled cardinal | | | | Paroaria dominicana (Linnaeus, 1758) | 331 |
| Crimson-fronted cardinal | | | | Paroaria baeri Hellmayr, 1907 | 332 |
| Yellow-billed cardinal | | | | Paroaria capitata (d'Orbigny & Lafresnaye, 1837) | 333 |
| Masked cardinal | | | | Paroaria nigrogenis (Lafresnaye, 1846) | 334 |
| Red-capped cardinal | | | | Paroaria gularis (Linnaeus, 1766) | 335 |
| Dotted tanager | | | | Ixothraupis varia (Müller, PLS, 1776) | 336 |
| Rufous-throated tanager | | | | Ixothraupis rufigula (Bonaparte, 1851) | 337 |
| Spotted tanager | | | | Ixothraupis punctata (Linnaeus, 1766) | 338 |
| Speckled tanager | | | | Ixothraupis guttata (Cabanis, 1851) | 339 |
| Yellow-bellied tanager | | | | Ixothraupis xanthogastra (Sclater, PL, 1851) | 340 |
| Golden-naped tanager | | | | Chalcothraupis ruficervix (Prévost & des Murs, 1842) | 341 |
| Azure-rumped tanager | | | | Poecilostreptus cabanisi (Sclater, PL, 1868) | 342 |
| Grey-and-gold tanager | | | | Poecilostreptus palmeri (Hellmayr, 1909) | 343 |
| Blue-grey tanager | | | | Thraupis episcopus (Linnaeus, 1766) | 344 |
| Sayaca tanager | | | | Thraupis sayaca (Linnaeus, 1766) | 345 |
| Glaucous tanager | | | | Thraupis glaucocolpa Cabanis, 1851 | 346 |
| Azure-shouldered tanager | | | | Thraupis cyanoptera (Vieillot, 1817) | 347 |
| Yellow-winged tanager | | | | Thraupis abbas (Deppe, 1830) | 348 |
| Golden-chevroned tanager | | | | Thraupis ornata (Sparrman, 1789) | 349 |
| Palm tanager | | | | Thraupis palmarum (Wied-Neuwied, M, 1821) | 350 |
| Black-headed tanager | | | | Stilpnia cyanoptera (Swainson, 1834) | 351 |
| Silver-backed tanager | | | | Stilpnia viridicollis (Taczanowski, 1884) | 352 |
| Sira tanager | | | | Stilpnia phillipsi (Graves, GR & Weske, 1987) | 353 |
| Straw-backed tanager | | | | Stilpnia argyrofenges (Sclater, PL & Salvin, 1876) | 354 |
| Black-capped tanager | | | | Stilpnia heinei (Cabanis, 1851) | 355 |
| Golden-hooded tanager | | | | Stilpnia larvata (Du Bus de Gisignies, 1846) | 356 |
| Blue-necked tanager | | | | Stilpnia cyanicollis (d'Orbigny & Lafresnaye, 1837) | 357 |
| Masked tanager | | | | Stilpnia nigrocincta (Bonaparte, 1838) | 358 |
| Black-backed tanager | | | | Stilpnia peruviana (Desmarest, 1806) | 359 |
| Chestnut-backed tanager | | | | Stilpnia preciosa (Cabanis, 1851) | 360 |
| Green-capped tanager | | | | Stilpnia meyerdeschauenseei (Schulenberg & Binford, 1985) | 361 |
| Scrub tanager | | | | Stilpnia vitriolina (Cabanis, 1851) | 362 |
| Burnished-buff tanager | | | | Stilpnia cayana (Linnaeus, 1766) | 363 |
| Lesser Antillean tanager | | | | Stilpnia cucullata (Swainson, 1834) | 364 |
| Blue-and-black tanager | | | | Tangara vassorii (Boissonneau, 1840) | 365 |
| Beryl-spangled tanager | | | | Tangara nigroviridis (Lafresnaye, 1843) | 366 |
| Spangle-cheeked tanager | | | | Tangara dowii (Salvin, 1863) | 367 |
| Green-naped tanager | | | | Tangara fucosa Nelson, 1912 | 368 |
| Blue-browed tanager | | | | Tangara cyanotis (Sclater, PL, 1858) | 369 |
| Rufous-cheeked tanager | | | | Tangara rufigenis (Sclater, PL, 1857) | 370 |
| Metallic-green tanager | | | | Tangara labradorides (Boissonneau, 1840) | 371 |
| Bay-headed tanager | | | | Tangara gyrola (Linnaeus, 1758) | 372 |
| Rufous-winged tanager | | | | Tangara lavinia (Cassin, 1858) | 373 |
| Golden-eared tanager | | | | Tangara chrysotis (Du Bus de Gisignies, 1846) | 374 |
| Saffron-crowned tanager | | | | Tangara xanthocephala (Tschudi, 1844) | 375 |
| Flame-faced tanager | | | | Tangara parzudakii (Lafresnaye, 1843) | 376 |
| Blue-whiskered tanager | | | | Tangara johannae (Dalmas, 1900) | 377 |
| Green-and-gold tanager | | | | Tangara schrankii (Spix, 1825) | 378 |
| Golden tanager | | | | Tangara arthus Lesson, RP, 1832 | 379 |
| Emerald tanager | | | | Tangara florida (Sclater, PL & Salvin, 1869) | 380 |
| Silver-throated tanager | | | | Tangara icterocephala (Bonaparte, 1851) | 381 |
| Seven-colored tanager | | | | Tangara fastuosa (Lesson, RP, 1831) | 382 |
| Green-headed tanager | | | | Tangara seledon (Müller, PLS, 1776) | 383 |
| Red-necked tanager | | | | Tangara cyanocephala (Müller, PLS, 1776) | 384 |
| Brassy-breasted tanager | | | | Tangara desmaresti (Vieillot, 1819) | 385 |
| Gilt-edged tanager | | | | Tangara cyanoventris (Vieillot, 1819) | 386 |
| Plain-colored tanager | | | | Tangara inornata (Gould, 1855) | 387 |
| Turquoise tanager | | | | Tangara mexicana (Linnaeus, 1766) | 388 |
| White-bellied tanager | | | | Tangara brasiliensis (Linnaeus, 1766) | 389 |
| Paradise tanager | | | | Tangara chilensis (Vigors, 1832) | 390 |
| Opal-crowned tanager | | | | Tangara callophrys (Cabanis, 1849) | 391 |
| Opal-rumped tanager | | | | Tangara velia (Linnaeus, 1758) | 392 |
