= Black-hooded tanager =

Conservation status
- Not evaluated (IUCN 3.1)

Scientific classification
- Domain: Eukaryota
- Kingdom: Animalia
- Phylum: Chordata
- Class: Aves
- Order: Passeriformes
- Family: Thraupidae
- Genus: Stilpnia
- Species: S. whitelyi

Binomial name
- Stilpnia whitelyi (Salvin & Godman, 1884)

Species of bird

The black-hooded tanager (Stilpnia whitelyi) is a species of bird in the family Thraupidae. It is found in southern Venezuela, Guyana and northern Brazil. Its natural habitats are subtropical or tropical moist montane forests, subtropical or tropical high-altitude shrubland, and heavily degraded former forest. The black-hooded tanager was formerly considered as a subspecies of the black-headed tanager (Stilpnia cyanoptera).

== Taxonomy ==
The black-hooded tanager was formally described in 1884 by the English naturalists Osbert Salvin and Frederick DuCane Godman based on a specimen that had been collected by Henry Whitely near Mount Roraima. The mountain is located at the junction of Brazil, Guyana and Venezuela. Salvin and Godman placed the new species in the genus Calliste and coined the binomial name Calliste whitelyi where the specific epithet was chosen to honour the collector. The black-hooded tanager is now one of 15 species placed in the genus Stilpnia that was erected in 2016. The black-hooded tanager was formerly considered as a subspecies of the black-headed tanager Stilpnia cyanoptera) but was separated as a distinct species based on the differences in plumage and vocalizations. The species is monotypic: no subspecies are recognised.
