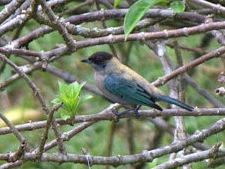

Conservation status
- Least Concern (IUCN 3.1)

Scientific classification
- Kingdom: Animalia
- Phylum: Chordata
- Class: Aves
- Order: Passeriformes
- Family: Thraupidae
- Genus: Stilpnia
- Species: S. cucullata

Binomial name
- Stilpnia cucullata (Swainson, 1834)

= Lesser Antillean tanager =

Species of bird

The Lesser Antillean tanager (Stilpnia cucullata) is a species of bird in the family Thraupidae. Males are largely buff-colored, with purplish-chestnut crowns, blackish masks, and blue-green-edged blackish wings. The tanager is only found in Grenada and Saint Vincent. It inhabits a number of habitats, including rainforests, dry forests, humid forests, secondary growth, woodland edge, and gardens. It is omnivorous.

== Taxonomy ==
The Lesser Antillean tanager was formally described as Aglaia Cucullata by the English naturalist William Swainson in 1834. The type locality of the species was erroneously reported as being Brazil, but it was later corrected to Grenada. The specific epithet is derived from the Latin word meaning "hooded". The species seems to be most closely related to the scrub tanager.

The Lesser Antillean tanager has two recognised subspecies. These subspecies are considered to be distinct species by some authorities.

- S. c. versicolor Lawrence, 1878: It is found on Saint Vincent. It is also known as the Saint Vincent tanager.
- S. c. cucullata Swainson, 1834: The nominate subspecies, it is found on Grenada. It is also known as the Grenada tanager.

== Description ==
Lesser Antillean tanagers grow to a length of 14–15 cm (5.5–5.9 in). Males are largely buff-colored, with yellowish-buff backs from the neck down to the rump and lavender-buff underparts with dark mottling on the throat. The top of the head is purplish-chestnut and there is a blackish mask across the eyes. The wings and tail feathers are blackish with blue-green margins, while the undertail coverts are tawny-buff. Females are paler and more greenish than males. Juveniles are duller than adults and have very indistinct masks and crowns.

== Distribution and habitat ==
The only Stilpnia tanagers found in the Caribbean, Lesser Antillean tanagers are found only on the islands of Saint Vincent and Grenada in the south of the Lesser Antilles. They inhabit a number of habitats, including rainforests, dry forests, humid forests, secondary growth, woodland edge, and gardens. They are more common at higher elevations.

== Ecology ==
Lesser Antillean tanagers are omnivores, eating fruit such as mangoes, figs, and soursops alongside arthropods. They forage in small groups, gleaning prey from leaves and sallying to catch insects. Breeding takes place between April and July, with the tanagers making cup nests of dead leaves several metres up in trees or bushes. These nests are frequently in the vicinity of buildings and contain two bluish-white eggs maculated with brownish-gray.

== Conservation ==
The Lesser Antillean tanager is split into two species, the Saint Vincent tanager and Grenada tanager, by the IUCN. The IUCN classifies both as being of least concern. Although it has an extremely small range, it prefers more open habitats and thus adapts well to human disturbance within its range. It can vary locally from being uncommon to rather common in its range.
