= Sira tanager =

Conservation status
- Least Concern (IUCN 3.1)

Scientific classification
- Kingdom: Animalia
- Phylum: Chordata
- Class: Aves
- Order: Passeriformes
- Family: Thraupidae
- Genus: Stilpnia
- Species: S. phillipsi

Binomial name
- Stilpnia phillipsi (Graves, GR & Weske, 1987)

Species of bird

The Sira tanager (Stilpnia phillipsi) is a species of bird in the family Thraupidae. It is endemic to Peru and exists only in the Sira range.

It was first discovered in July 1969 on an expedition from Graves and Weske. Between 1969 and 1972, John Terborgh and Weske reported about their collections in the Cerros del Sira on the discovery of this new species of tanager that is related to the black-capped tanager.

Its natural habitat is subtropical or tropical moist montane forests. It is threatened by habitat loss.
