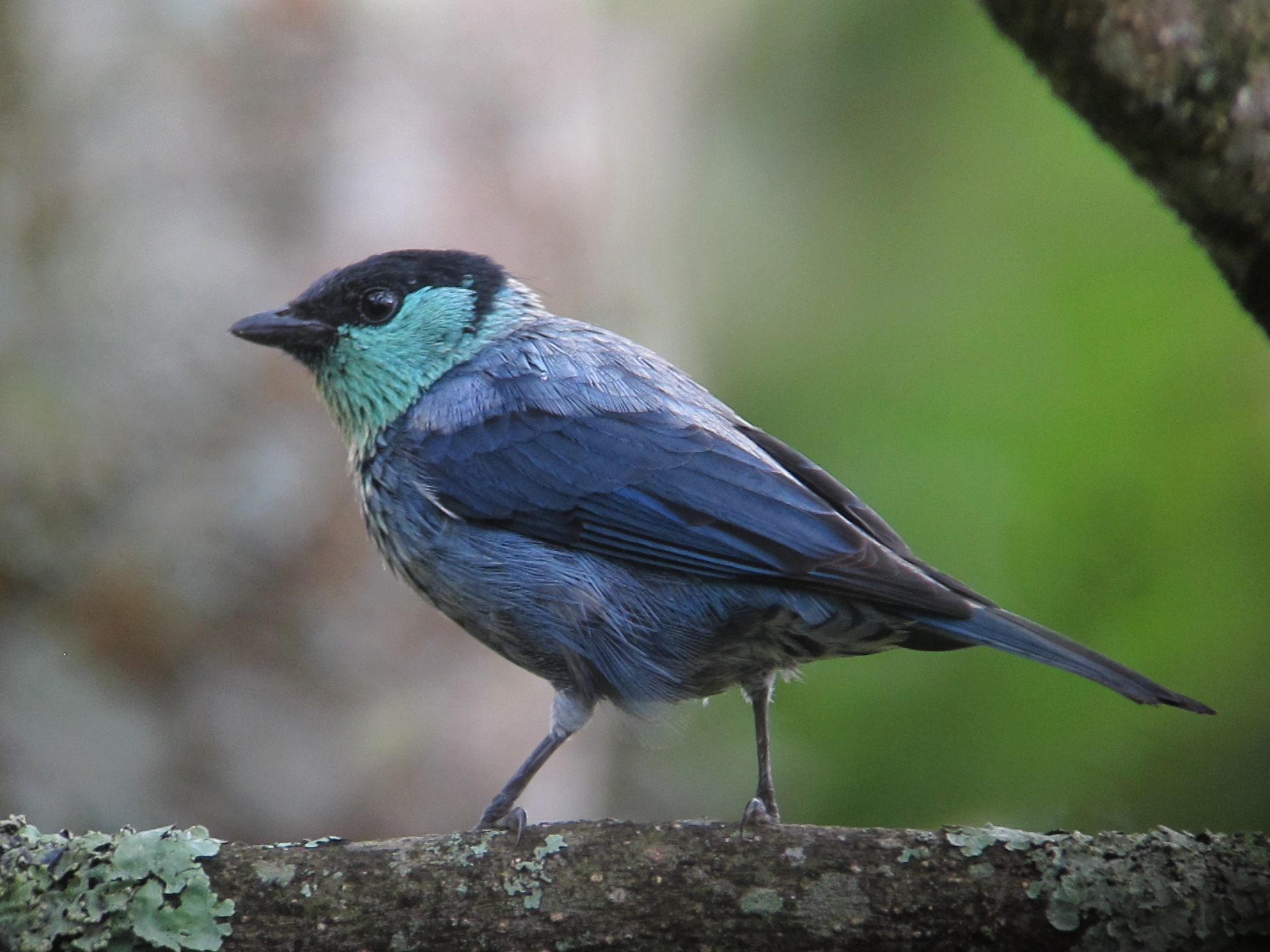
- Black-capped tanager (Stilpnia heinei)

Scientific classification
- Kingdom: Animalia
- Phylum: Chordata
- Class: Aves
- Order: Passeriformes
- Family: Thraupidae
- Genus: Stilpnia; Burns, KJ, Unitt & Mason, NA, 2016

Type species
- Aglaia cyanoptera Swainson, 1834

Species
- See text

= Stilpnia =

Genus of birds

Stilpnia is a genus of Neotropical birds in the tanager family Thraupidae.

Many of these tanagers have a contrasting cap or hood and most have green or gold ear-coverts and throats.

== Taxonomy and species list ==
These species were formerly placed in the genus Tangara. A molecular phylogenetic study published in 2014 found that Tangara was polyphyletic. In the rearrangement to create monophyletic genera, the genus, Stilpnia, was erected in 2016 with the black-headed tanager as the type species. The genus name is from the Ancient Greek στιλπνή (stilpnḗ) meaning "glittering" or "glistening".

The genus contains the following 15 species:

Genus Stilpnia – Burns, Unitt & Mason, 2016 – fifteen species
| Common name | Scientific name and subspecies | Range | Size and ecology | IUCN status and estimated population |
|---|---|---|---|---|
| Black-headed tanager | Stilpnia cyanoptera (Swainson, 1834) | Andes of northeastern Colombia and the Venezuelan Coastal Range | Size: Habitat: Subtropical or tropical moist montane forests, high-altitude shrubland and heavily degraded former forest Diet: | LC |
| Black-hooded tanager | Stilpnia whitelyi (Salvin & Godman, 1884) | Southern Venezuela, Guyana and northern Brazil | Size: Habitat: Subtropical or tropical moist montane forests, high-altitude shrubland and heavily degraded former forest Diet: | NE |
| Silver-backed tanager | Stilpnia viridicollis (Taczanowski, 1884) | Southern Ecuador, Peru and Bolivia; regularly spotted at Machu Picchu | Size: Habitat: Humid highland forests Diet: | LC |
| Sira tanager | Stilpnia phillipsi (Graves, GR & Weske, 1987) | Endemic to Peru, found only in the Sira range | Size: Habitat: Subtropical or tropical moist montane forests Diet: | LC |
| Straw-backed tanager | Stilpnia argyrofenges (Sclater, PL & Salvin, 1876) | Andes of southernmost Ecuador, Peru and Bolivia | Size: Habitat: Humid highland forests Diet: | VU Generally local and uncommon |
| Black-capped tanager | Stilpnia heinei (Cabanis, 1851) | Mountains of Ecuador, Colombia and Venezuela, including the Sierra de Perijá and the Santa Marta mountains in Colombia | Size: About 13 cm (5.1 in); 18–20 g (0.63–0.71 oz) Habitat: Edges of subtropical forest, secondary woodland, and trees and bushes in nearby open spaces; 1,300–2,200 m (4,300–7,200 ft) or 1,000–2,800 m (3,300–9,200 ft) by different sources, mostly 1,500–2,200 m (4,900–7,200 ft) Diet: Mainly insects, in low shrubs and trees, staying close to the trunk on bare or mossy branches; also fruits such as whole berries and cecropia fruit; alone or in pairs, more often independent of mixed flocks | LC Unknown; uncommon, with no evidence of decline |
| Golden-hooded tanager | Stilpnia larvata (Du Bus de Gisignies, 1846) | Resident breeder from southern Mexico south to western Ecuador | Size: 13 cm (5.1 in); 19 g (0.67 oz) Habitat: Canopy of dense forests and semi-open areas such as clearings, second growth and well-vegetated gardens, from sea level to 1,500 m (4,900 ft) Diet: Small fruit (e.g. Trophis racemosa) usually swallowed whole, and insects; in pairs, family groups or mixed-species flocks | LC |
| Blue-necked tanager | Stilpnia cyanicollis (d'Orbigny & Lafresnaye, 1837) | South America, from Colombia to Bolivia | Size: 12 cm (4.7 in); about 17 g (0.60 oz) Habitat: Subtropical or tropical moist lowland forest, moist montane forest and heavily degraded former forest Diet: Fruits, berries, flower blossoms and insects, with fruit the major item; picks insects from leaves or sometimes in flight | LC |
| Masked tanager | Stilpnia nigrocincta (Bonaparte, 1838) | Bolivia, Brazil, Colombia, Ecuador, Guyana, Peru and Venezuela | Size: Habitat: Subtropical or tropical moist lowland forests and heavily degraded former forest Diet: | LC |
| Black-backed tanager | Stilpnia peruviana (Desmarest, 1806) | Endemic to south-eastern Brazil | Size: Habitat: Forests and shrubs Diet: | VU |
| Chestnut-backed tanager | Stilpnia preciosa (Cabanis, 1851) | Southern Brazil, north-eastern Argentina, eastern Paraguay and Uruguay | Size: Habitat: Mature forests, especially edges, up to 1,000 m (3,300 ft) Diet: | LC |
| Green-capped tanager | Stilpnia meyerdeschauenseei (Schulenberg & Binford, 1985) | Endemic to Puno, Peru, and La Paz, Bolivia | Size: Habitat: Forest edge and gardens, at 1,450–2,200 m (4,800–7,200 ft) Diet: | NT Small population; fairly common and possibly spreading |
| Scrub tanager | Stilpnia vitriolina (Cabanis, 1851) | Colombia and Ecuador | Size: Habitat: Subtropical or tropical moist montane forests, high-altitude shrubland and heavily degraded former forest Diet: | LC |
| Burnished-buff tanager | Stilpnia cayana (Linnaeus, 1766) Seven subspecies: S. c. fulvescens (Todd, 1922); S. c. cayana (Linnaeus, 1766); S. c. huberi (Hellmayr, 1910); S. c. flava (Gmelin, JF, 1789); S. c. sincipitalis (Berlepsch, 1907); S. c. chloroptera (Vieillot, 1819); S. c. margaritae (Allen, JA, 1891) | Northern Guianas, most of Venezuela and east-central Colombia; near the Amazon River outlet and most of eastern Brazil, Paraguay and northeast Argentina; very locally in Bolivia and Peru | Size: Habitat: Virtually any semi-open habitat with trees, including gardens, plantations and parks Diet: Largely frugivorous, particularly fond of the fruits of Cecropia, Brazilian pepper and introduced Magnoliaceae such as Michelia champaca; usually singly or in pairs | LC |
| Lesser Antillean tanager | Stilpnia cucullata (Swainson, 1834) Two subspecies: S. c. versicolor Lawrence, 1878; S. c. cucullata Swainson, 1834 | Grenada and Saint Vincent only | Size: 14–15 cm (5.5–5.9 in) Habitat: Rainforests, dry forests, humid forests, secondary growth, woodland edge and gardens; more common at higher elevations Diet: Omnivorous: fruit such as mangoes, figs and soursops, and arthropods; forages in small groups, gleaning prey from leaves and sallying to catch insects | LC |
