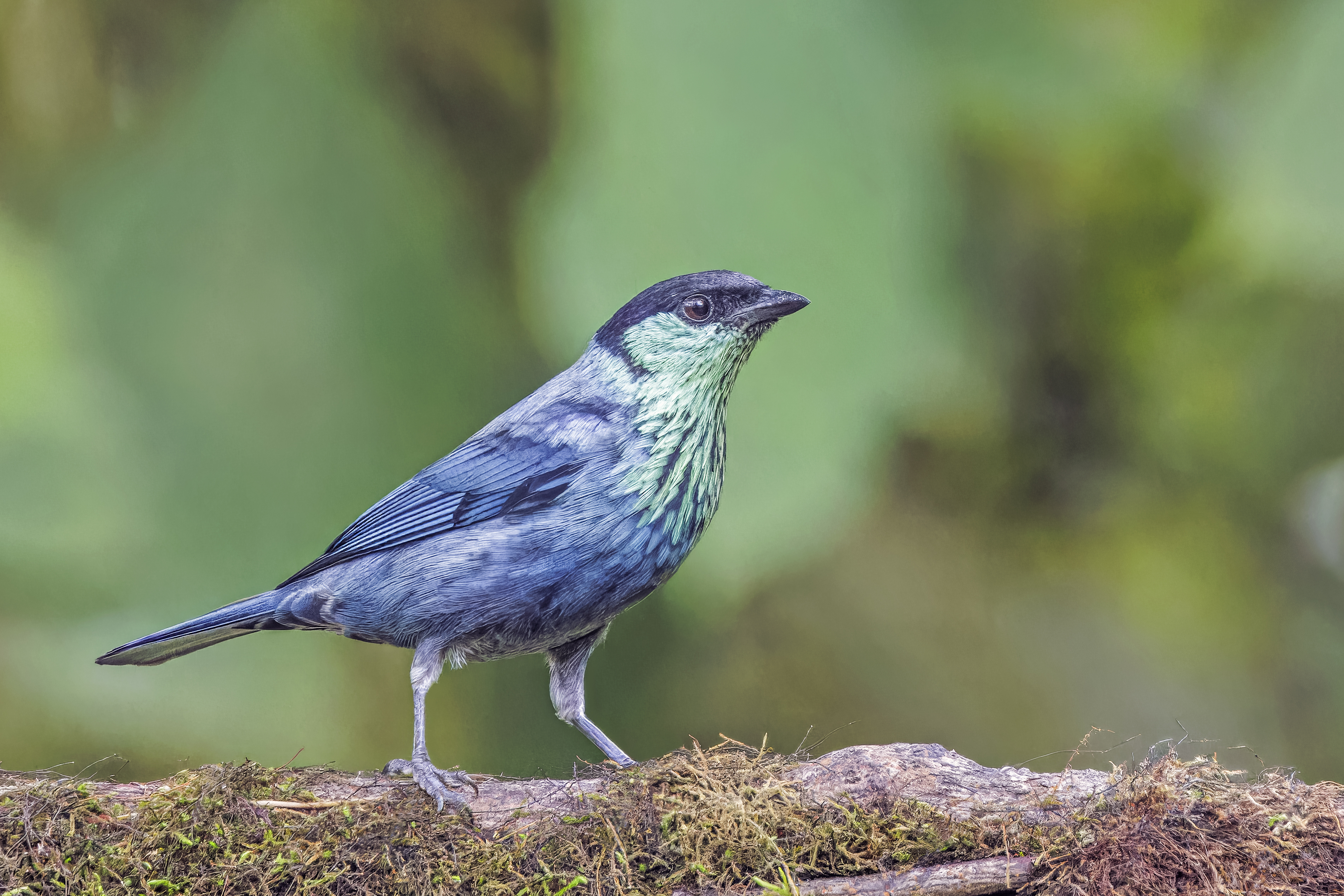
- Male
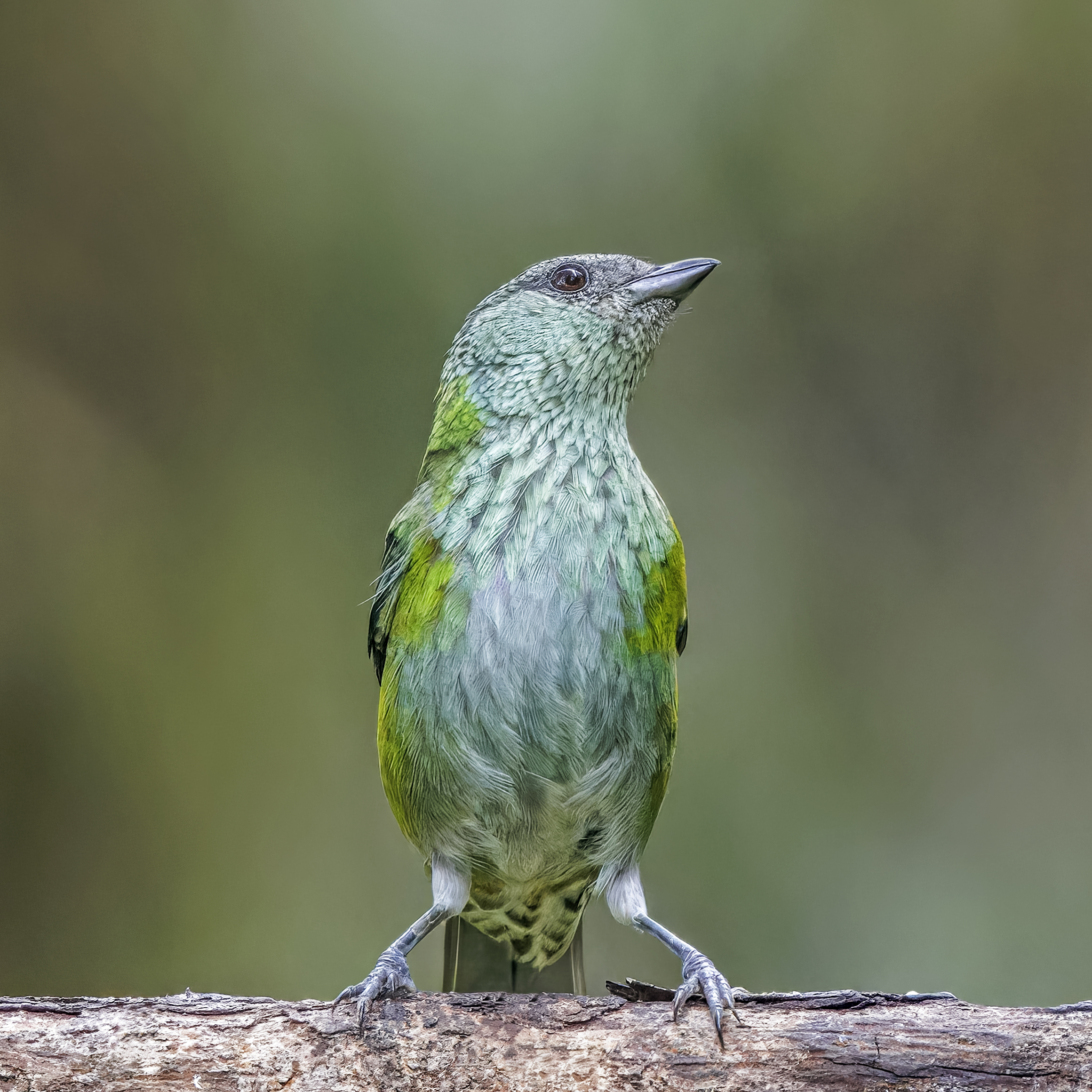
- Female both in Ecuador

Conservation status
- Least Concern (IUCN 3.1)

Scientific classification
- Kingdom: Animalia
- Phylum: Chordata
- Class: Aves
- Order: Passeriformes
- Family: Thraupidae
- Genus: Stilpnia
- Species: S. heinei

Binomial name
- Stilpnia heinei (Cabanis, 1851)

= Black-capped tanager =

South american bird species

The black-capped tanager (Stilpnia heinei) is one of the many species of Neotropical bird in the family Thraupidae. It lives in the mountains of Ecuador, Colombia, and Venezuela year-round. This bird can often be found in open landscapes, alone or in pairs, hiding under branches of trees and bushes. Its natural habitats are subtropical or tropical moist montane forests and heavily degraded former forest.

== Taxonomy and nomenclature ==
The black-capped tanager was described in 1851, from a type specimen collected in Colombia. It is a member of the genus Stilpnia in the tanager family Thraupidae. In Spanish, it is locally called "Tangara gorrinegra" or "Tangara coroninegra". The black-capped tanager is a songbird (Passeriformes). The tanagers are a very diverse group with over 300 species that account for more than 10% of all birds in the Neotropics. The genus name Stilpnia was proposed in 2016 instead of Tangara for T. heinei in order to match the phylogenetic relationships among tanagers. This was based on DNA analysis done in the tanager family. This bird is most closely related to the straw-backed tanager (Stilpnia argyrofenges) from which it diverged during the late Pleistocene glaciation cycles.

"Black-capped tanager" has been designated as the official common name for the species by the International Ornithologists' Union (IOC).

== Description ==
The black-capped tanager is approximately 13 centimetres (5 in) long, and weighs between 18 and 20 grams. The bird's iris is dark brown, while the beak and legs are black. The male of the species has a black crown, with the black extending to the lores, forehead, and upper nape. Its upper-parts are a shining silvery bluish-grey, which extends to the upper tail coverts, and contrasts sharply with the black crown. The upperwing-coverts are a duller bluish-grey, with an edging of duller blue, whereas the primary coverts are black, with a dull blue edge paler than that of the wing coverts. The tertial feathers are also black with a blue outer edge. The throat, the sides of the neck, the sides of the head until the eye, and the chest are a shining aquamarine-green or opalescent green. The feathers are lanceolate, or spear-shaped. Their black bases are thus visible, giving this area of the bird a streaked or scaly appearance, which is especially visible on the chest. The rest of the underparts are a dull and uniform greyish-blue, with the exception of the undertail-coverts: these feathers have dark centers and broad, white edges.

The female, in contrast, has a dusky crown, the feathers of which are edged in green, giving it a slightly scaly appearance. It is also generally duller than the male. The upperparts are a uniform shining green, while the tail is a duller green or olive-green. The primary coverts are dusky, with a green outer edge, while the greater coverts are dusky on the inner half and dull green on the outer half, and the lesser coverts and median upperwing-coverts are greenish, with a dull base, and the lesser and median upperwing-coverts mainly greenish with dusky bases. The wing coverts generally appear green. The flight feathers are dusky, with a bluish-green edging, while the tertial feathers are similar to the greater coverts, being dull green on the outer half. The underside of the female is similar to but duller than the male, with the throat, neck, and chest being green with a scaled appearance similar to the male created by dark bases to the feathers. The rest of the underside is grey, while the sides are olivaceous yellow-green, and the undertail coverts being similar to those of the male.

Juvenile, immature, and subadult males are intermediate in appearance between the adult males and females. Juvenile males resemble the female, but have a pale blue edge to their primary feathers. Immature individuals of both sexes are duller counterparts of the female adults. Subadult males resemble the females but have adult male feathers mixed in with their other plumage, including a mixed green and black crown, and mixed green and silvery-grey feathering on the back and mantle.

The black-capped tanager resembles the silver-backed tanager (Stilpnia viridicollis), which replaces it at the southern edge of its range. Females of the two species are especially alike, but those of the silver-backed tanager have a coppery, rather than a green, throat. The beryl-spangled tanager (Tangara nigroviridis) is also similar, but lacks the dark crown and is uniformly opalescent over its head; it also has a more strongly spangled underside.

In contrast to other members of its genus, the black-capped tanager sings frequently. It shows no preference for singing at specific times of the day. It usually sings from a high and occasionally exposed position. The songs are up to ten seconds long, low-pitched, and have a mechanical, ringing quality, described as "t'kling-t'kling-t'kling". The call is often repeated within a few minutes. Other calls include a high-pitched and nasal "zheet", and a high-pitched "tsit".

== Habitat and distribution ==
Black-capped tanagers are found in tropical moist montane forests in northern Ecuador, Colombia, and Venezuela. The species is found at the edges of subtropical forest, secondary woodland, and trees and bushes in nearby open spaces, although it is locally uncommon. Its elevational range is variously described as being between 1,300 and 2,200 metres (4,300 and 7,200 ft), and between 1,000 and 2,800 metres (3,300 and 9,200 ft) above sea level, although most records occur between 1,500 and 2,200 metres (4,900 and 7,200 ft). An isolated record exists from 700 metres (2,300 ft) above sea level. It is found in the Colombian, Venezuelan, Ecuadoran, and Peruvian Andes, including in the Sierra de Perijá, and also in the Santa Marta mountains in Colombia. Within Ecuador, it was first recorded on the western slopes of the Andes only in 1980, leading researchers to suggest it may have expanded its range as a result of deforestation.

== Behaviour ==
This tanager is found alone or in pairs, hiding under branches. Its behaviour and ecology are generally similar to other species of montane Tangara, though it is more often seen foraging in clearings and outside actual forest, and more often foraging as pairs independent of mixed flocks.

=== Diet ===
Different tanager species can feed together in the same flock without competing for arthropods as they each feed at specific heights, on different parts of the tree with unique positions and movements. The black-capped tanager mainly forages for insects in low shrubs and in trees, staying close to the trunk, on branches that are either bare or covered in moss. This bird also eats fruits such as whole berries and cecropia fruit.

=== Reproduction ===
Usually during wetter periods, both parents feed their young and build the nest. Nevertheless, the male does not always take part in nest construction. The outside of the nest is mostly made of rootlets and lichen, sometimes moss. The whole is held together by spider webs and egg sacs. The inside of the nest contains mainly lichen, rootlets, and grass strips. In order to give the nest its cup-like shape, the female presses her body down into the nest and vibrates. The female incubates the eggs for 14 days on average and broods, meanwhile the male will occasionally feed her. The female will sink into the nest if a nest predator such as the green jay approaches.

== Conservation status ==
Its global population remains unknown, but it is described as being uncommon in its range. In the absence of evidence for population or range declines, the International Union for Conservation of Nature classified it in 2018 as a species of "least concern". This may be because the black-capped tanager lives in disturbed forest habitat and therefore benefits in some ways from human disturbances. However, if someone approaches the nest, the female will stop incubating her eggs, which might put pressure on the bird in the future.

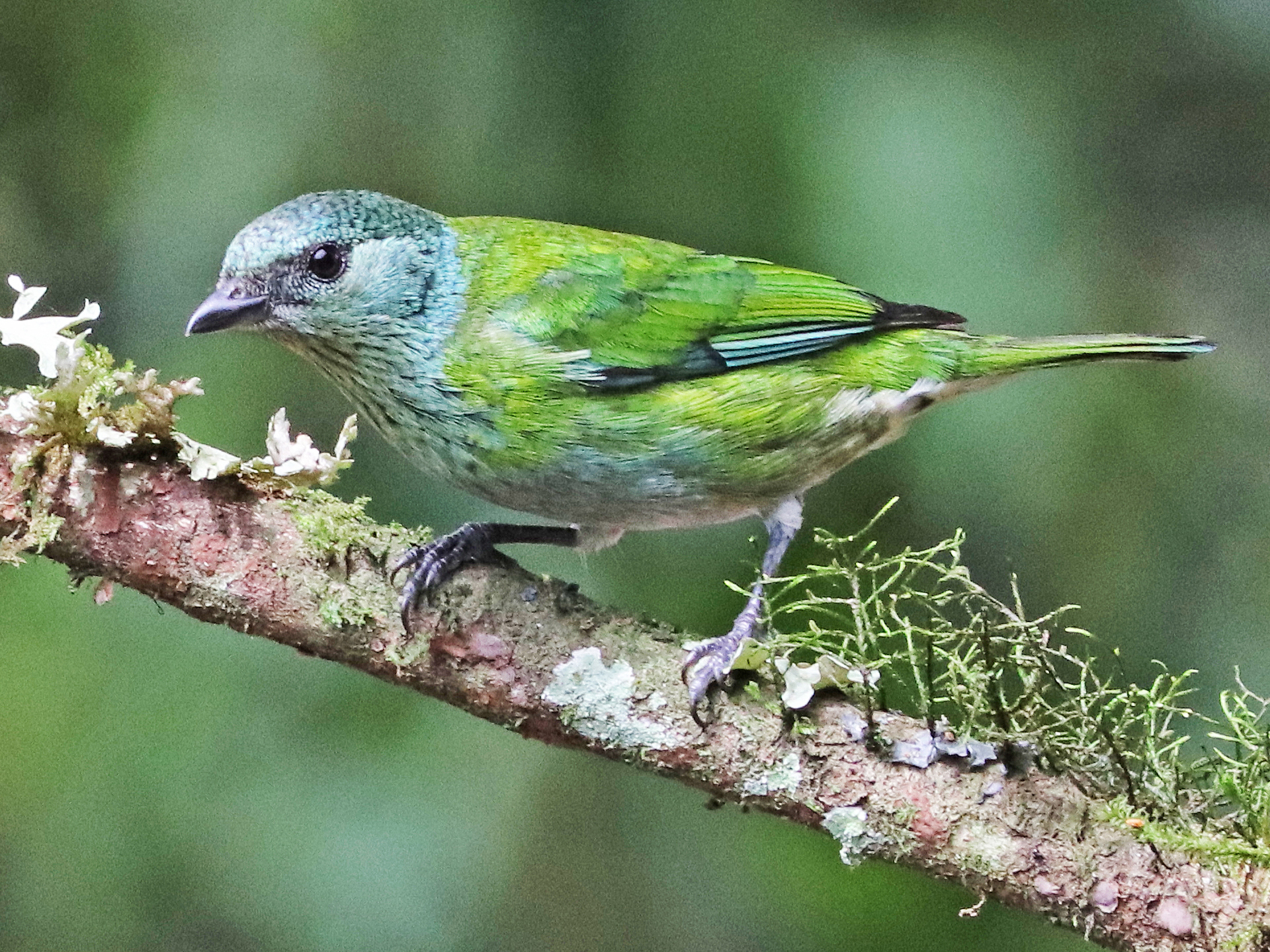
female

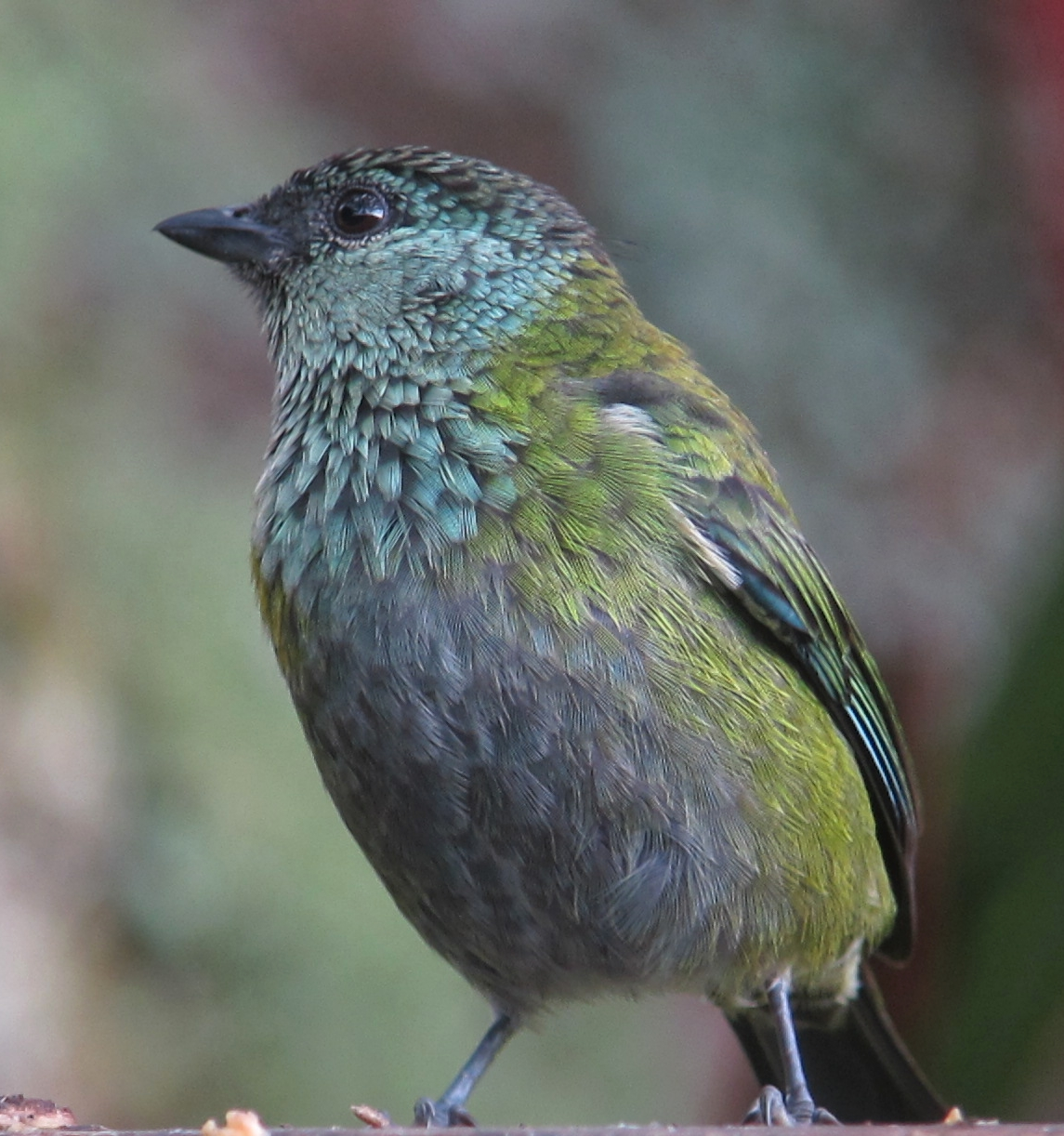
Immature female, Colombia
