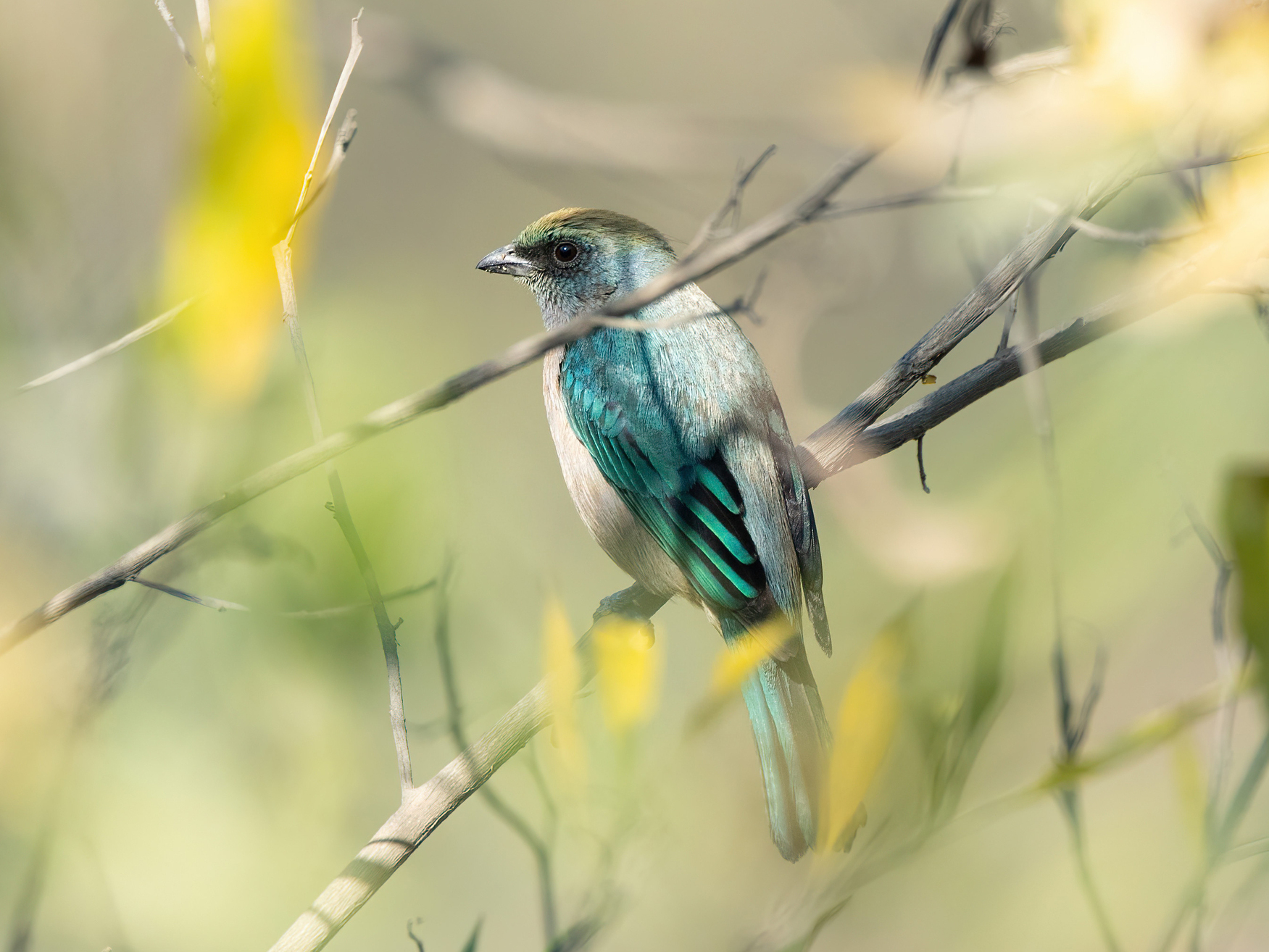

Conservation status
- Near Threatened (IUCN 3.1)

Scientific classification
- Kingdom: Animalia
- Phylum: Chordata
- Class: Aves
- Order: Passeriformes
- Family: Thraupidae
- Genus: Stilpnia
- Species: S. meyerdeschauenseei

Binomial name
- Stilpnia meyerdeschauenseei (Schulenberg & Binford, 1985)

Synonyms
- Tangara meyerdeschauenseei

= Green-capped tanager =

Species of bird

The green-capped tanager (Stilpnia meyerdeschauenseei) is a species of bird in the family Thraupidae. It is endemic to forest edge and gardens at altitudes of 1,450–2,200 m (4,760–7,220 ft) in Puno, Peru, and La Paz, Bolivia. It is fairly common and possibly spreading, but its small population has led to it being evaluated as Near Threatened by BirdLife International and IUCN. It closely resembles the widespread burnished-buff tanager (S. cayana), but its mantle is bluer (male) or greener (female), and its crown is greenish-buff. Its specific name commemorates the ornithologist Rodolphe Meyer de Schauensee.
