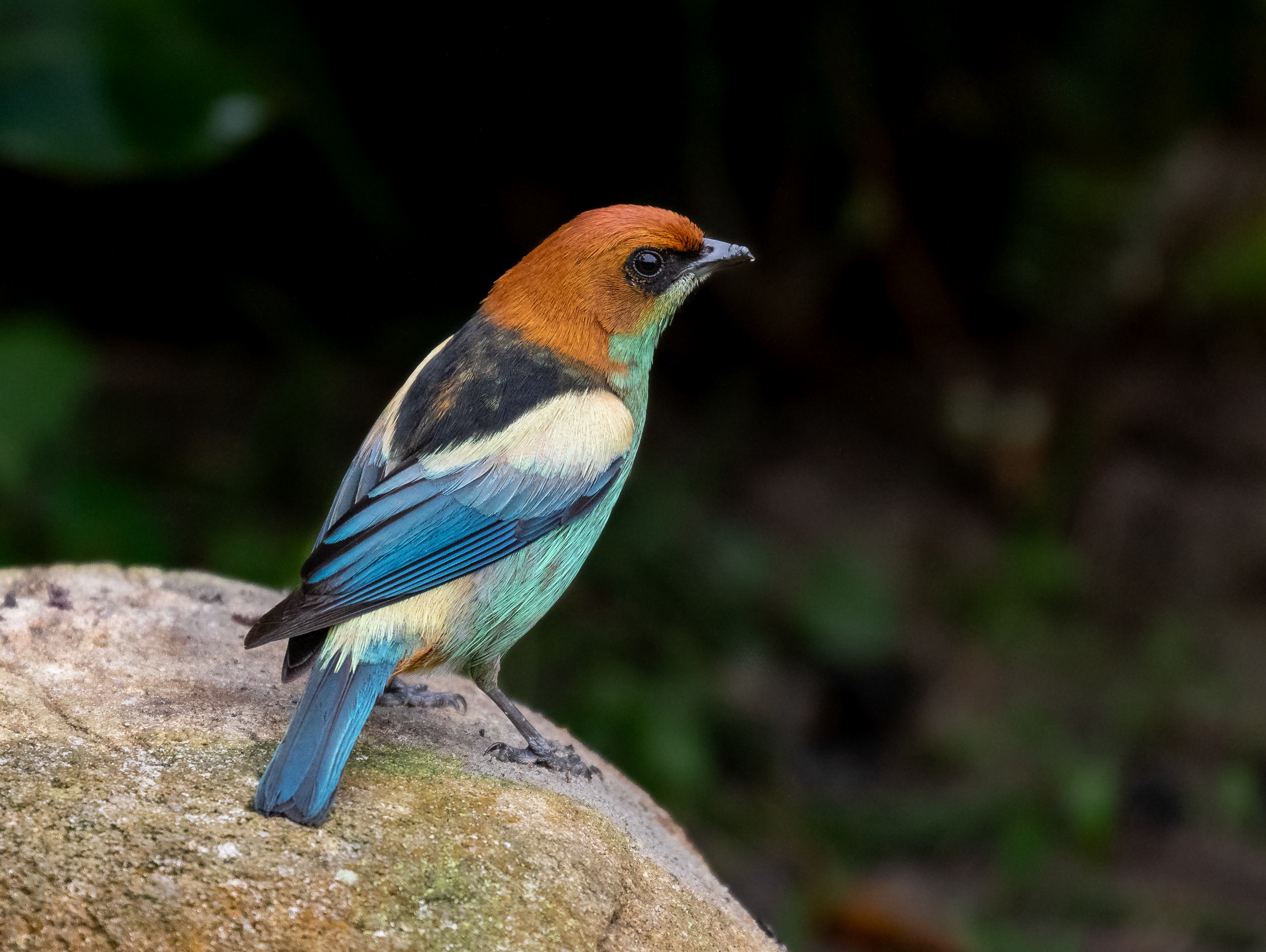
- male
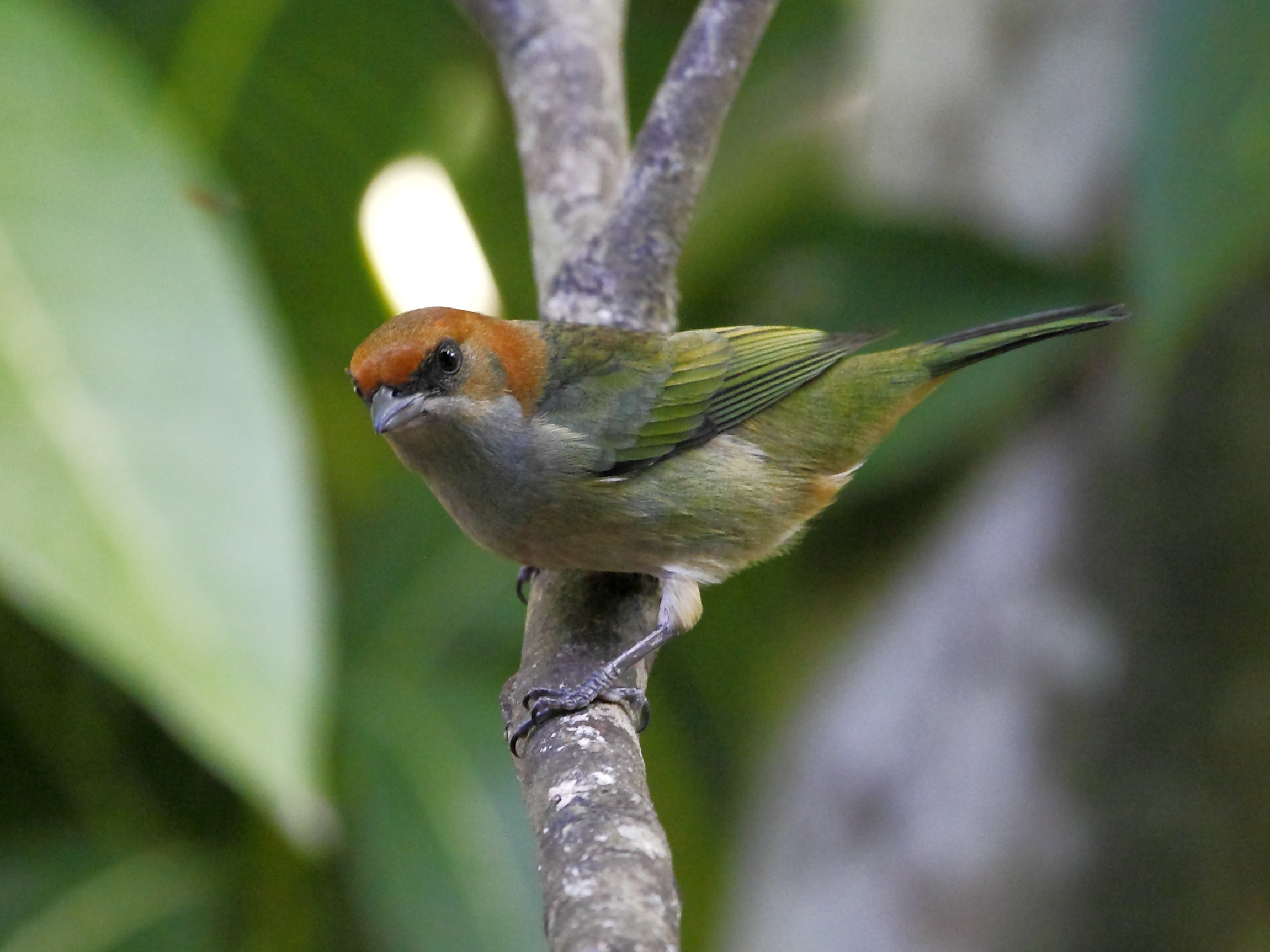
- female

Conservation status
- Vulnerable (IUCN 3.1)

Scientific classification
- Kingdom: Animalia
- Phylum: Chordata
- Class: Aves
- Order: Passeriformes
- Family: Thraupidae
- Genus: Stilpnia
- Species: S. peruviana

Binomial name
- Stilpnia peruviana (Desmarest, 1806)

Synonyms
- Tangara peruviana

= Black-backed tanager =

Species of bird

The black-backed tanager (Stilpnia peruviana) is a bird species in the Thraupidae family. It is endemic to the forests and shrubs of south-eastern Brazil. When first described, it was mistakenly believed that it originates from Peru, leading to the misleading scientific name peruviana. It is closely related to the chestnut-backed tanager, and the two have sometimes been considered conspecific.

It is threatened by habitat loss.
