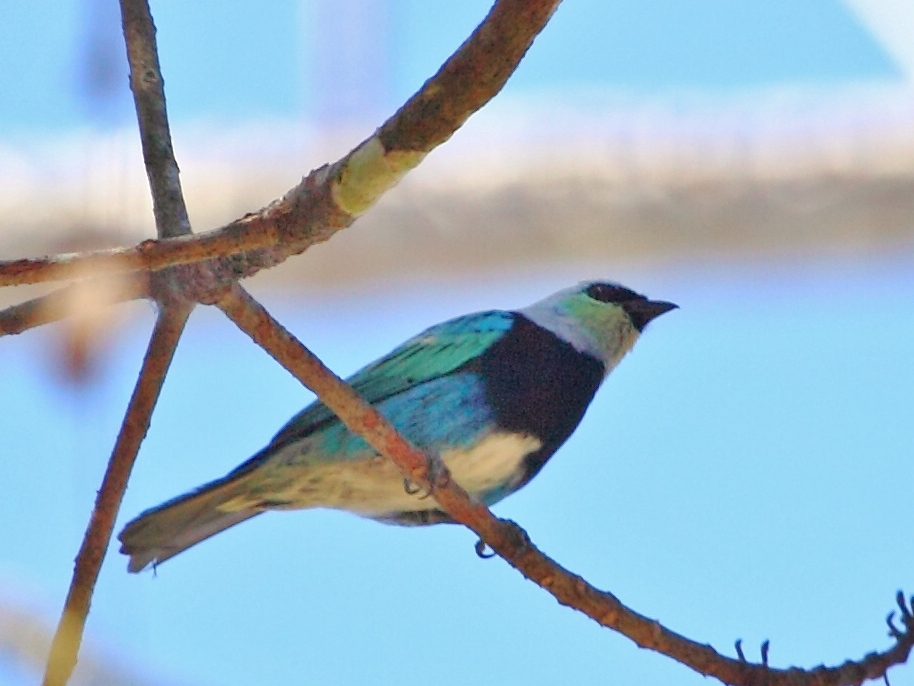

Conservation status
- Least Concern (IUCN 3.1)

Scientific classification
- Kingdom: Animalia
- Phylum: Chordata
- Class: Aves
- Order: Passeriformes
- Family: Thraupidae
- Genus: Stilpnia
- Species: S. nigrocincta

Binomial name
- Stilpnia nigrocincta (Bonaparte, 1838)

Synonyms
- Tangara nigrocincta; Tangara nigro-cincta

= Masked tanager =

Species of bird

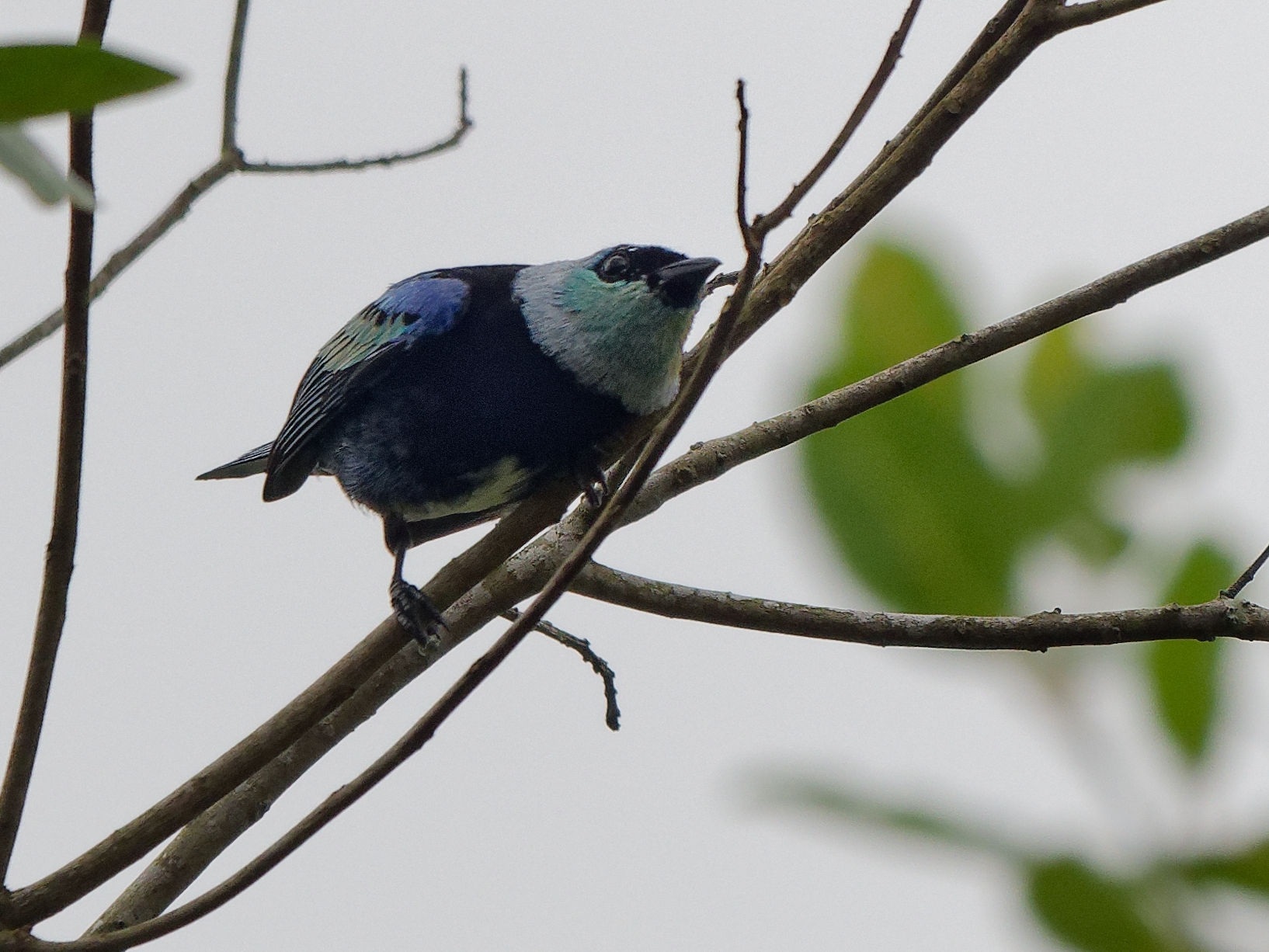
Masked tanager in Peru

The masked tanager (Stilpnia nigrocincta) is a species of bird in the family Thraupidae. It is found in Bolivia, Brazil, Colombia, Ecuador, Guyana, Peru, and Venezuela. Its natural habitats are subtropical or tropical moist lowland forests and heavily degraded former forest.
