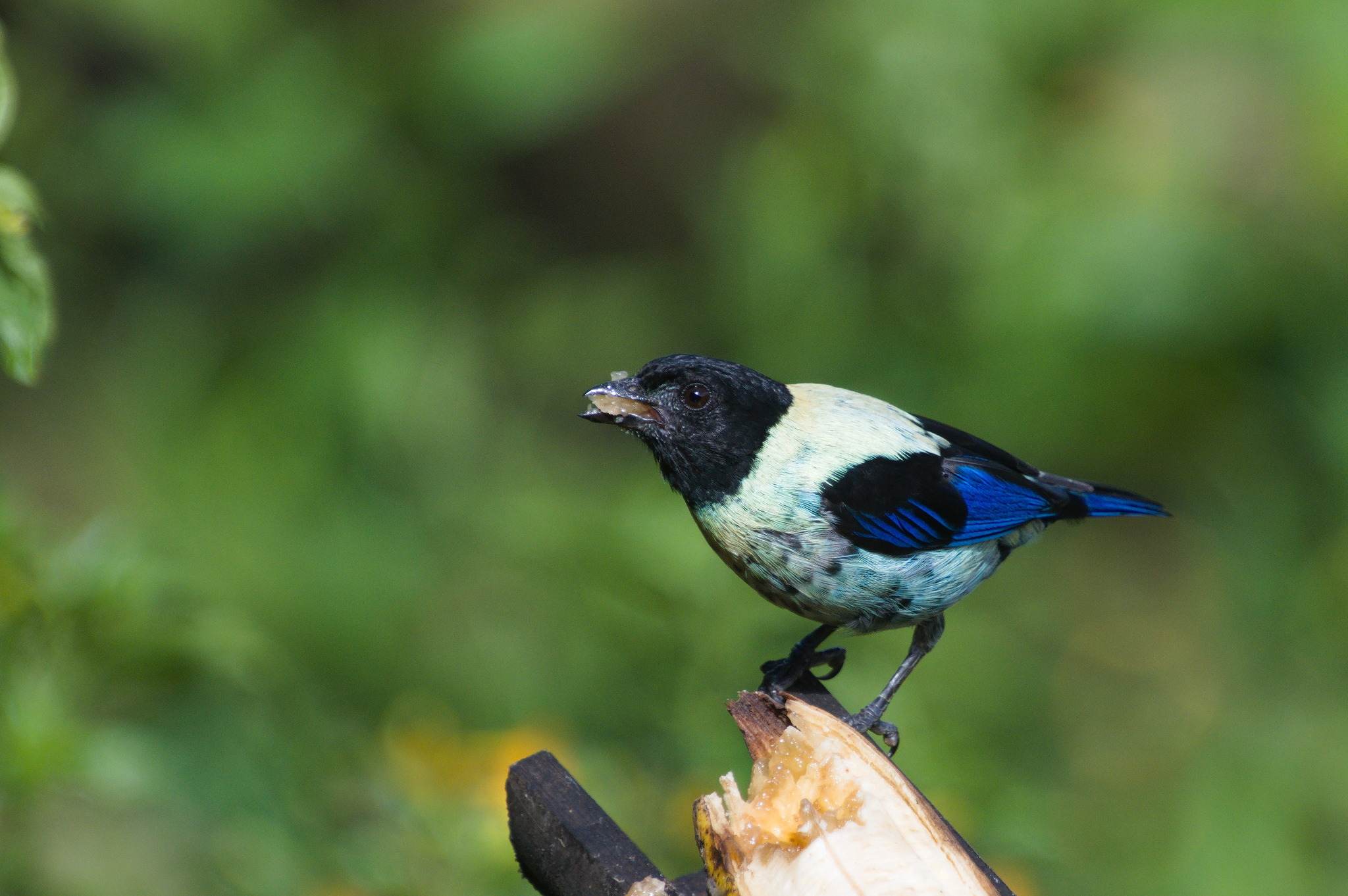

Conservation status
- Least Concern (IUCN 3.1)

Scientific classification
- Kingdom: Animalia
- Phylum: Chordata
- Class: Aves
- Order: Passeriformes
- Family: Thraupidae
- Genus: Stilpnia
- Species: S. cyanoptera

Binomial name
- Stilpnia cyanoptera (Swainson, 1834)

Synonyms
- Tanagra argentea Lafresnaye, 1843

= Black-headed tanager =

Species of bird

The black-headed tanager (Stilpnia cyanoptera) is a species of bird in the family Thraupidae. It is found in the Andes of northeastern Colombia and the Venezuelan Coastal Range. Its natural habitats are subtropical or tropical moist montane forests, subtropical or tropical high-altitude shrubland, and heavily degraded former forest. The black-hooded tanager (Stilpnia whitelyi) was formerly considered to be conspecific with this species.

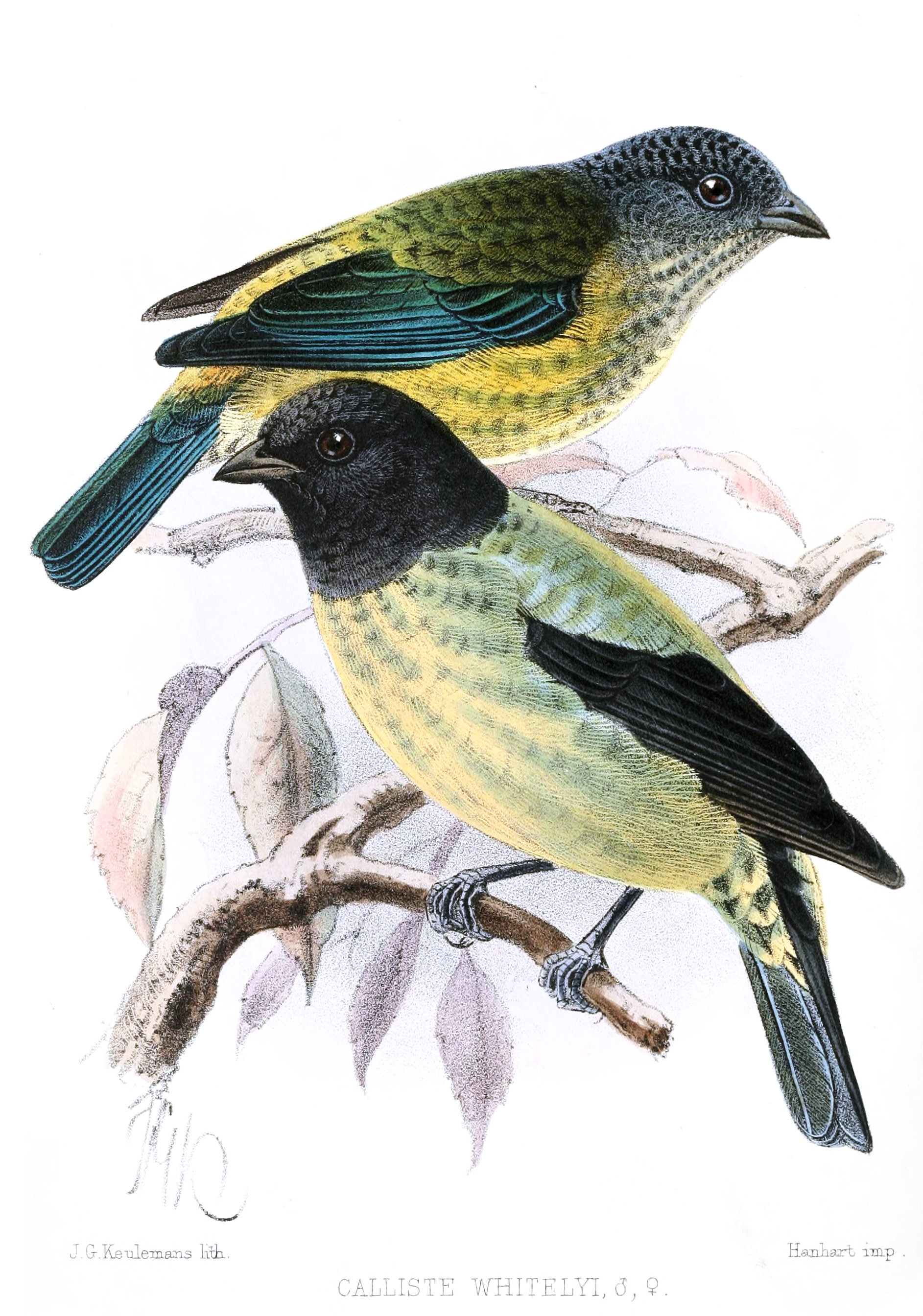

== Taxonomy ==
The black-headed tanager was illustrated in 1834 by the English zoologist William Swainson under the binomial name Aglaia cyanoptera. The specific epithet is from the Ancient Greek κυανοπτερος/kuanopteros meaning "blue-winged" or "dark-winged" from κυανος/kuanos meaning "dark-blue" and -πτερος/-pteros meaning "-winged". Swainson did not give a locality but in 1936 Carl Eduard Hellmayr suggested Caracas in Venezuela. The black-headed tanager is now one of 15 species placed in the genus Stilpnia that was introduced in 2016. The black-hooded tanager (Stilpnia whitelyi) was formerly considered as a subspecies.

When this species is placed in the same genus as the azure-shouldered tanager then under the rules of the International Code of Zoological Nomenclature, the name Aglaia cyanoptera Swainson, 1834 becomes pre-occupied by Saltator cyanopterus Vieillot, 1817 and the synonym Tangara argentea Lafresnaye, 1843 is used for the black-headed tanager.
