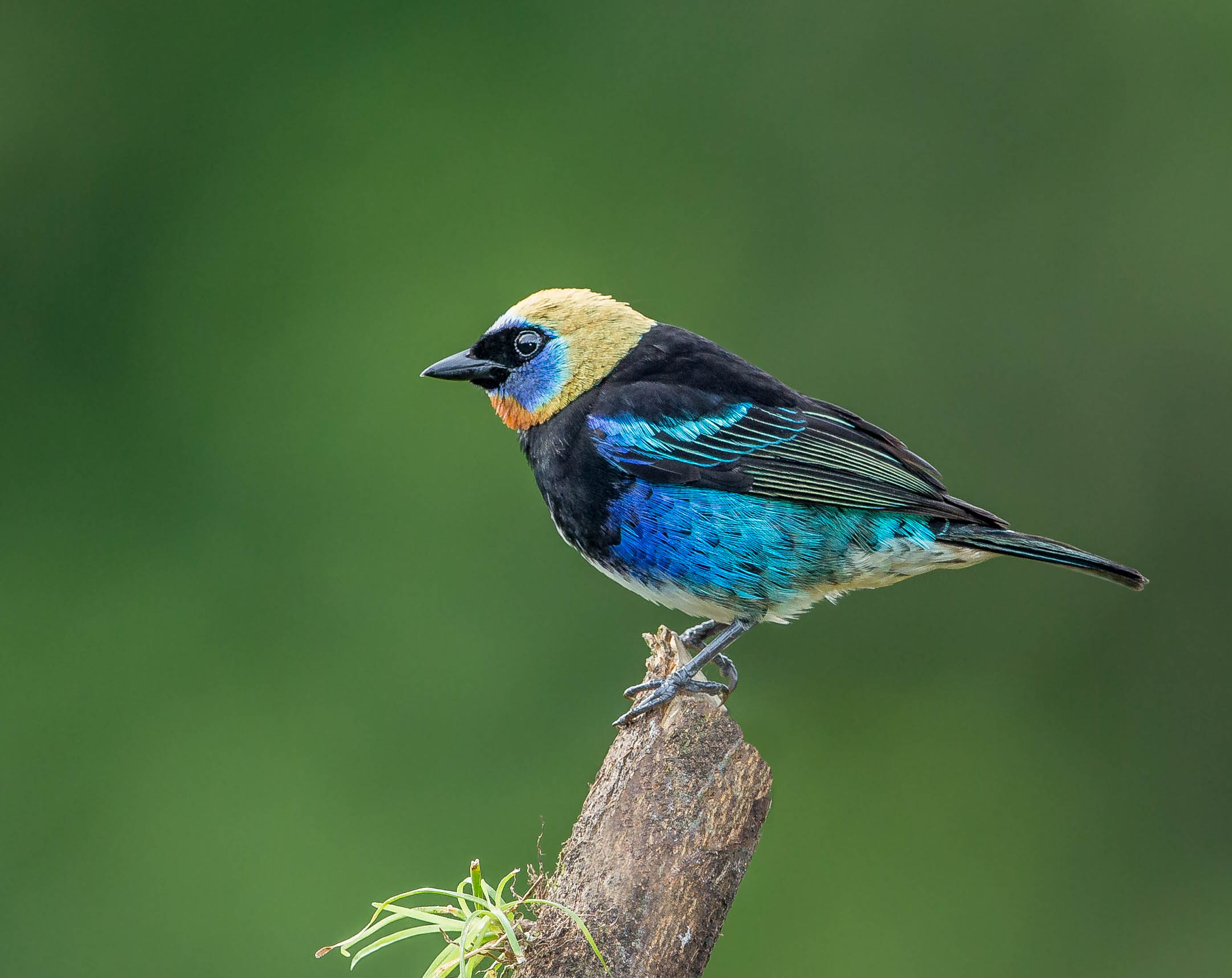
- Adult. Sexes are similar

Conservation status
- Least Concern (IUCN 3.1)

Scientific classification
- Kingdom: Animalia
- Phylum: Chordata
- Class: Aves
- Order: Passeriformes
- Family: Thraupidae
- Genus: Stilpnia
- Species: S. larvata

Binomial name
- Stilpnia larvata (Du Bus de Gisignies, 1846)

Synonyms
- Tangara larvata

= Golden-hooded tanager =

Species of bird

The golden-hooded tanager (Stilpnia larvata) is a medium-sized passerine bird. This tanager is a resident breeder from southern Mexico south to western Ecuador.

Adult golden-hooded tanagers are 13 cm (5.1 in) long and weigh 19 g (0.67 oz). The adult male has a golden head with a black eyemask edged with violet blue above and below. The upperparts of the body are black apart from the turquoise shoulders, rump and edgings of the wings and tail. The flanks are blue and the central belly is white. Females have a greenish tinge to the head, sometimes with black speckling on the crown, and more extensively white underparts. Immatures are duller, with a green head, dark grey upperparts, off-white underparts, and little blue in the plumage.

The golden-hooded tanager's call is a sharp tsit and the song is a tuneless rattled series of tick sounds.

It resides from sea level to 1,500 metres (4,920 ft) altitude in the canopy of dense forests and semi-open areas like clearings, second growth and well-vegetated gardens.

Golden-hooded tanagers occur in pairs, family groups or as part of a mixed-species feeding flock. They eat certain small fruit (e.g. of Trophis racemosa (Moraceae)) usually swallowed whole, and insects are also taken.

The cup nest is built in a tree fork or in a bunch of green bananas, and the normal clutch is two brown-blotched white eggs. This species is often double-brooded, and the young birds from the first clutch assist with feeding the second brood of chicks.

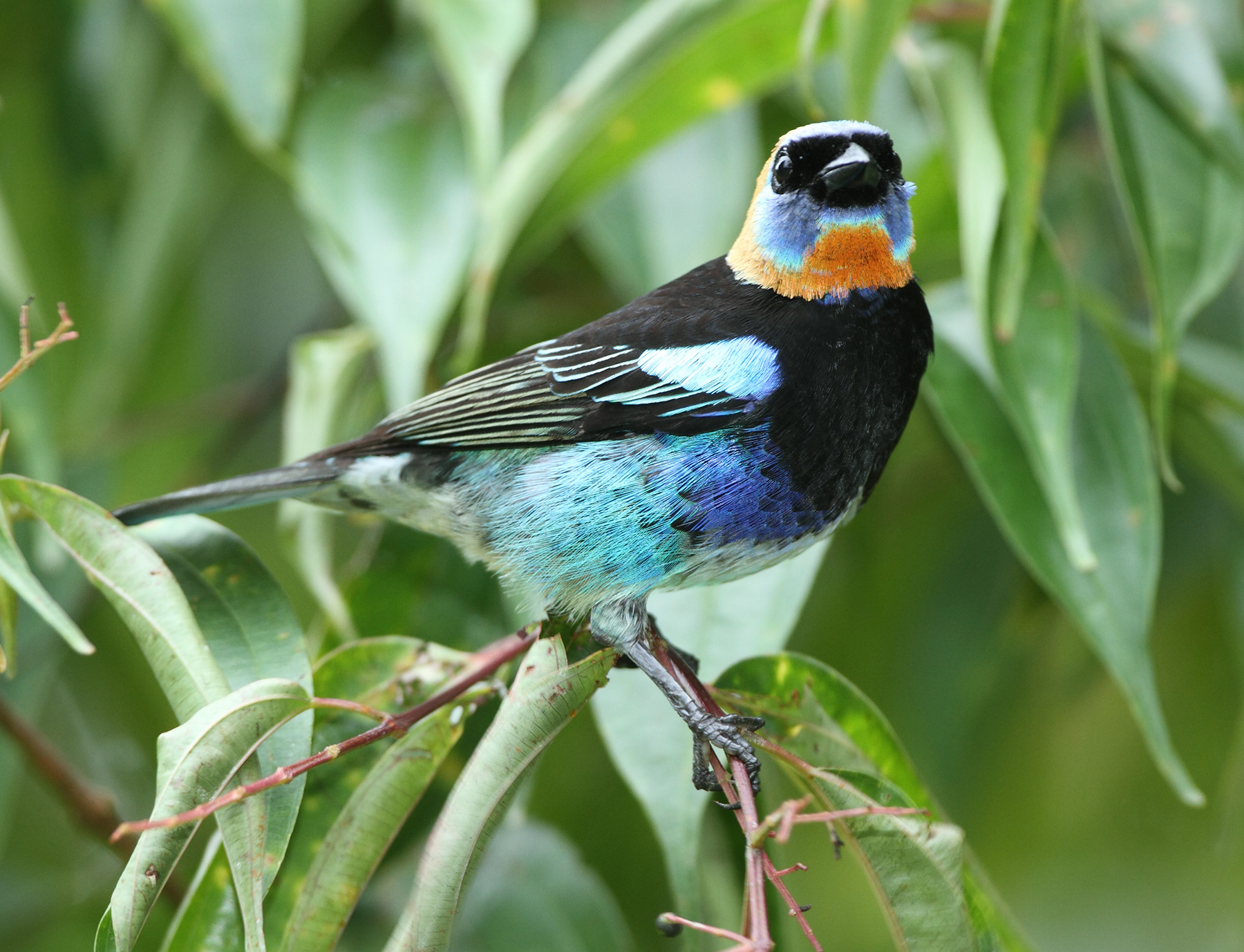
CATIE, Turrialba, Costa Rica
