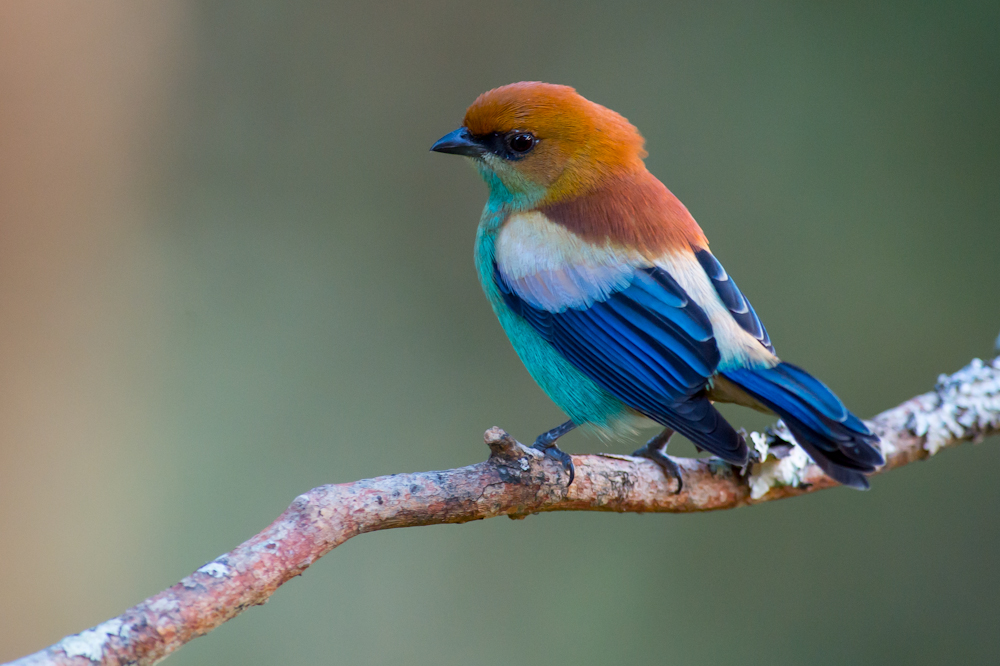
- male

Conservation status
- Least Concern (IUCN 3.1)

Scientific classification
- Kingdom: Animalia
- Phylum: Chordata
- Class: Aves
- Order: Passeriformes
- Family: Thraupidae
- Genus: Stilpnia
- Species: S. preciosa

Binomial name
- Stilpnia preciosa (Cabanis, 1851)

= Chestnut-backed tanager =

Species of bird

The chestnut-backed tanager (Stilpnia preciosa) is a species of bird in the family Thraupidae. It is found in southern Brazil, north-eastern Argentina, eastern Paraguay, and Uruguay in mature forests (especially edges) up to 1000m elevation. It is closely related to the rarer black-backed tanager, which have identical plumage except for the males' mantle (back feathers). Females of the two species are virtually indistinguishable by plumage. This bird is characterized by its blue-green breast and chestnut back. It was previously considered a color morph of the black-backed tanager (Stilpnia peruviana); however, Stilpnia is not known to be polymorphic, and the two species have different habitat preferences and breeding range. The tanager is reported as fairly common in part of its range and unlikely to face any particular threats; as a result, the IUCN has listed it as being of Least Concern.

== Behaviour and ecology ==
The tanager eats a variety of arthropods and wild and cultivated fruits. It can be found in pairs and in small (often mixed-species) flocks.
