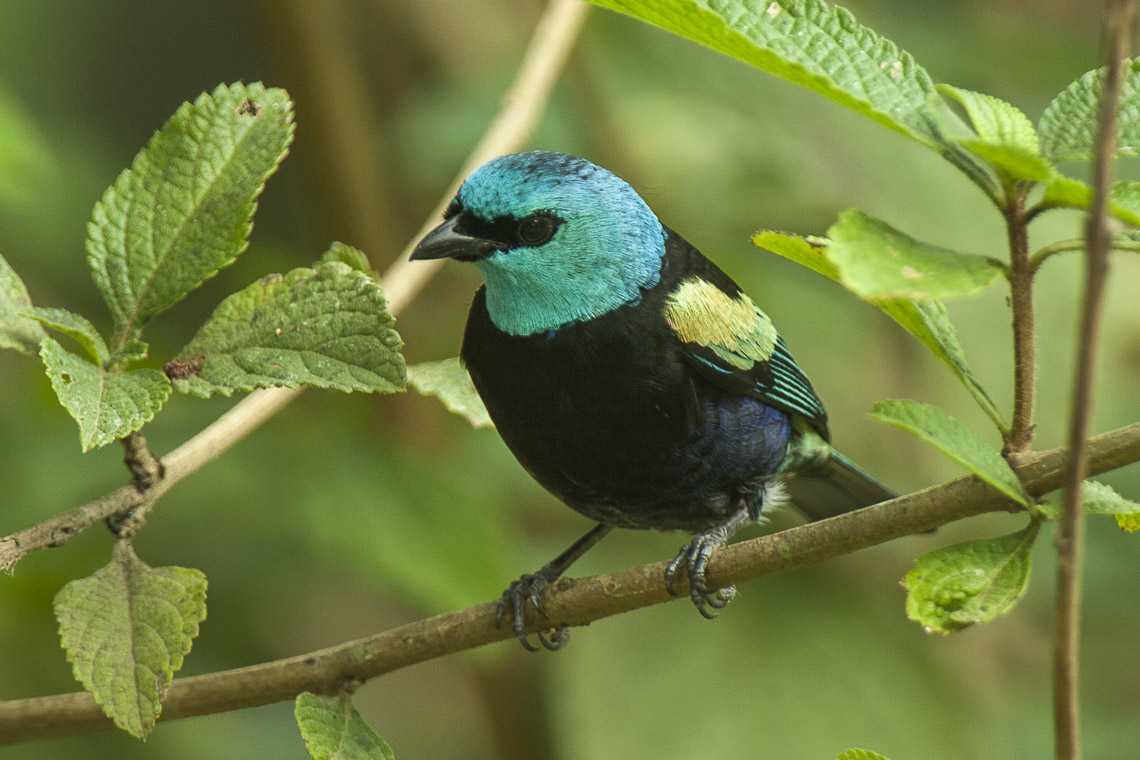
- S. c. cyanicollis, Peru
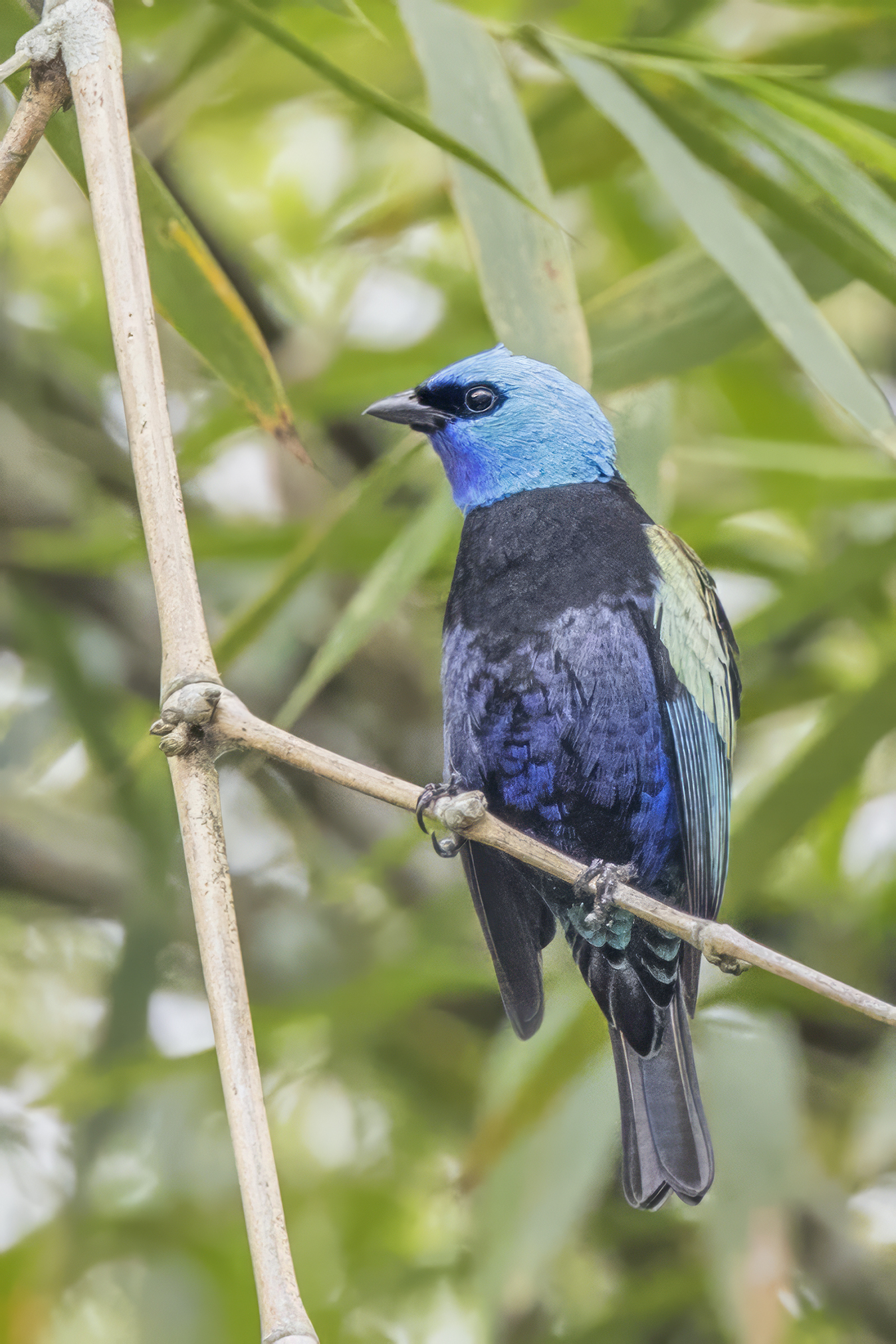
- S. c. granadenis, Colombia

Conservation status
- Least Concern (IUCN 3.1)

Scientific classification
- Kingdom: Animalia
- Phylum: Chordata
- Class: Aves
- Order: Passeriformes
- Family: Thraupidae
- Genus: Stilpnia
- Species: S. cyanicollis

Binomial name
- Stilpnia cyanicollis (d'Orbigny & Lafresnaye, 1837)

Synonyms
- Tangara cyanicollis

= Blue-necked tanager =

Species of bird

The blue-necked tanager (Stilpnia cyanicollis) is a species of bird in the family Thraupidae. It is found in South America from Colombia to Bolivia.

Its natural habitats are subtropical or tropical moist lowland forest, subtropical or tropical moist montane forest, and heavily degraded former forest. The blue-necked tanager averages 12 cm (4.7 in) in length and weighs approximately 17 g (5/8 oz). They have a blue hood and throat. The wing coverts, wing edges, and rump are turquoise to a greenish straw color. The posterior underparts are black, violet, or blue. The juveniles are brownish gray, with a hint of adult coloration. Coloration of adults varies slightly by region. The beaks, legs, and feet are black. The diet of the blue-necked tanager consists of fruits, berries, flower blossoms and insects. Tanagers will pick insects from leaves, or sometimes in flight, but fruit is the major dietary item.

The female builds a cup nest of moss, usually well concealed, and lays an average of 2 white eggs with brown spotting. Incubation is 13–14 days and the chicks fledge after 15–16 days. The male and female feed the nestlings on insects and fruit, and may be assisted by helpers.
