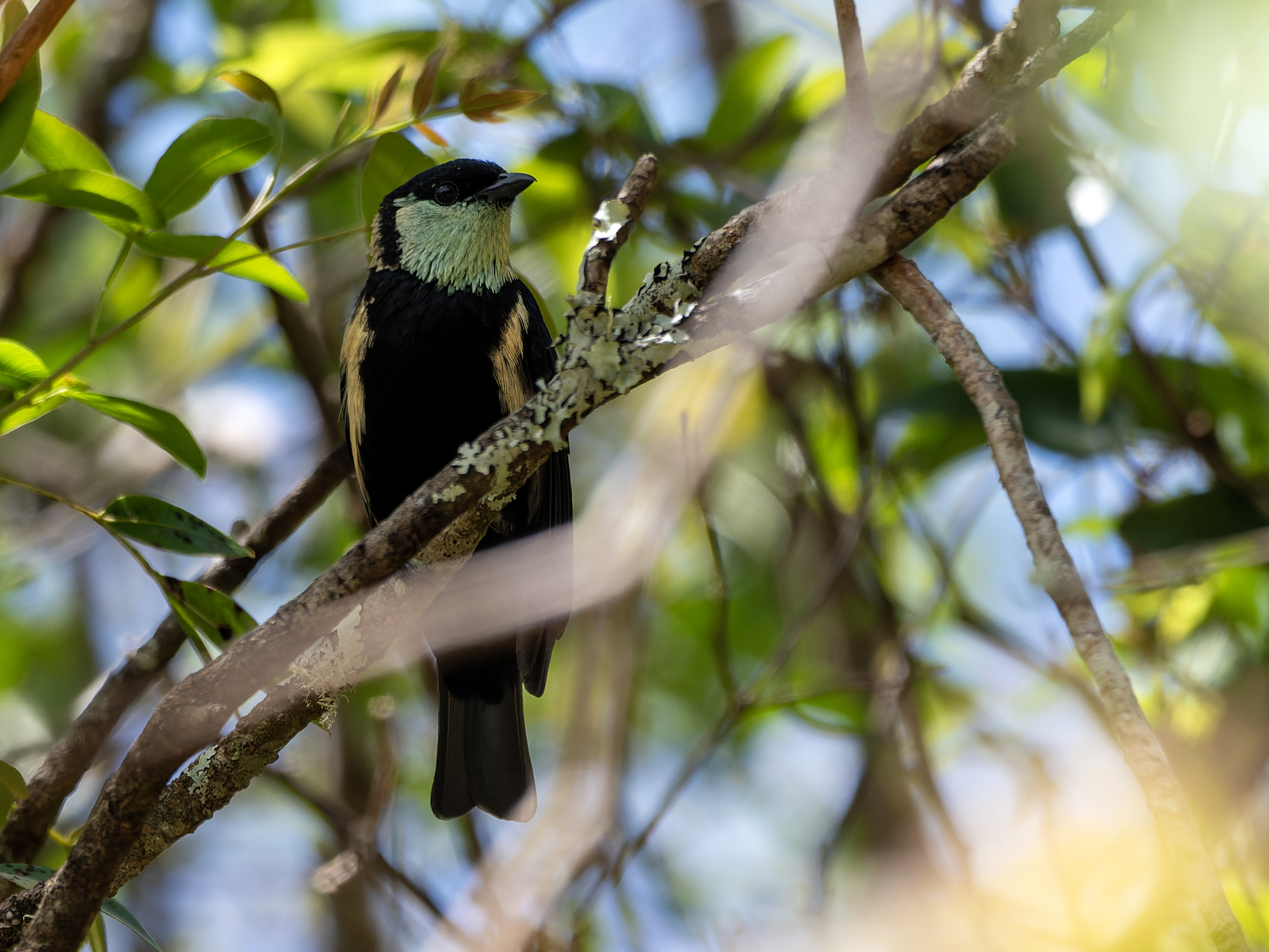

Conservation status
- Vulnerable (IUCN 3.1)

Scientific classification
- Kingdom: Animalia
- Phylum: Chordata
- Class: Aves
- Order: Passeriformes
- Family: Thraupidae
- Genus: Stilpnia
- Species: S. argyrofenges

Binomial name
- Stilpnia argyrofenges (Sclater, PL & Salvin, 1876)

= Straw-backed tanager =

Species of bird

The straw-backed tanager (Stilpnia argyrofenges), also known as the green-throated tanager, is a species of bird in the tanager family. It is found in humid highland forests in the Andes of southernmost Ecuador, Peru and Bolivia, but it is generally local and uncommon.
