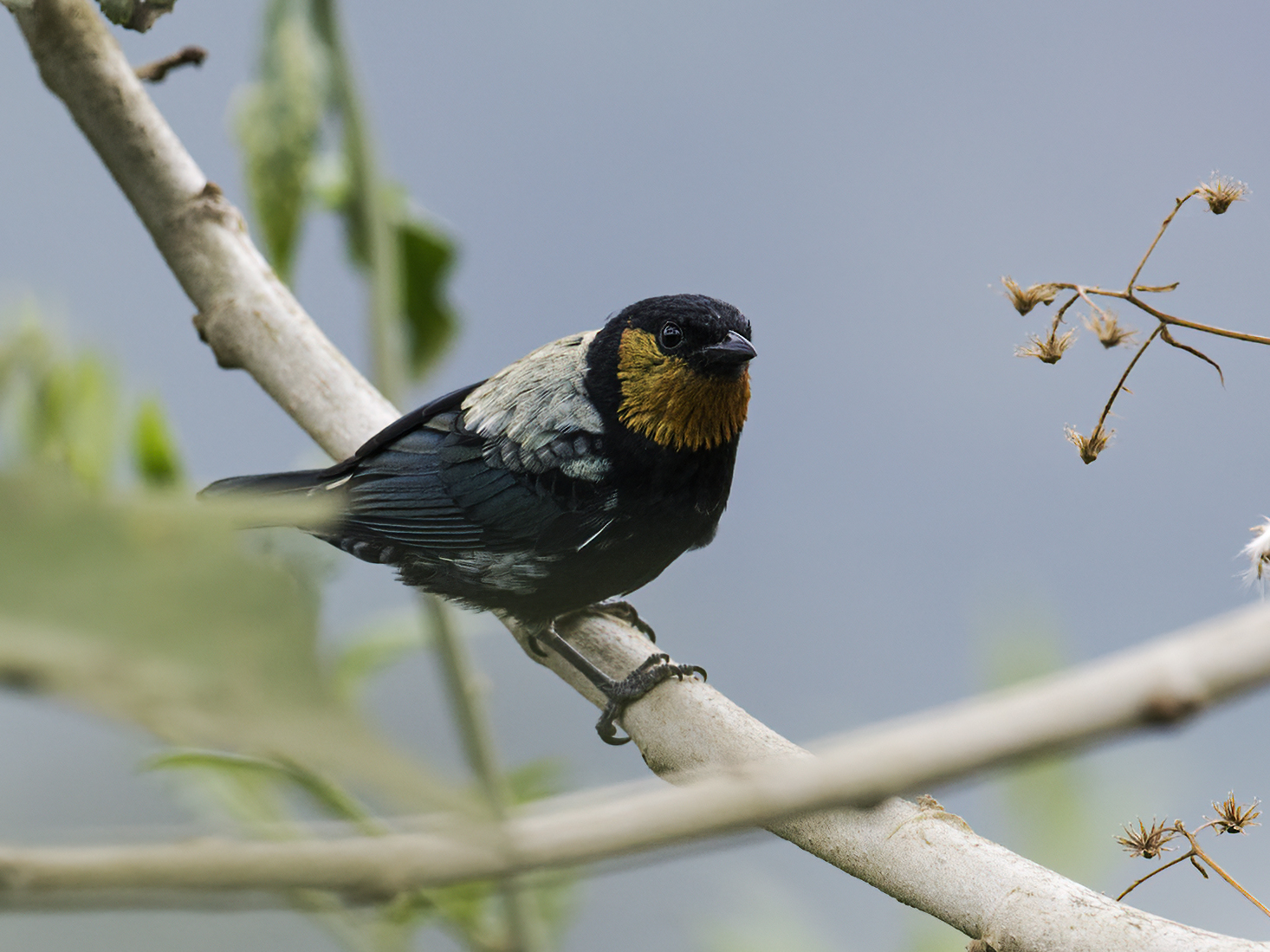
- male

Conservation status
- Least Concern (IUCN 3.1)

Scientific classification
- Kingdom: Animalia
- Phylum: Chordata
- Class: Aves
- Order: Passeriformes
- Family: Thraupidae
- Genus: Stilpnia
- Species: S. viridicollis

Binomial name
- Stilpnia viridicollis (Taczanowski, 1884)

= Silver-backed tanager =

Species of bird

The silver-backed tanager (Stilpnia viridicollis), also known as the silvery tanager, is a species of bird in the tanager family. It is found in humid highland forests in southern Ecuador, Peru, and Bolivia. It is regularly spotted at Machu Picchu.
