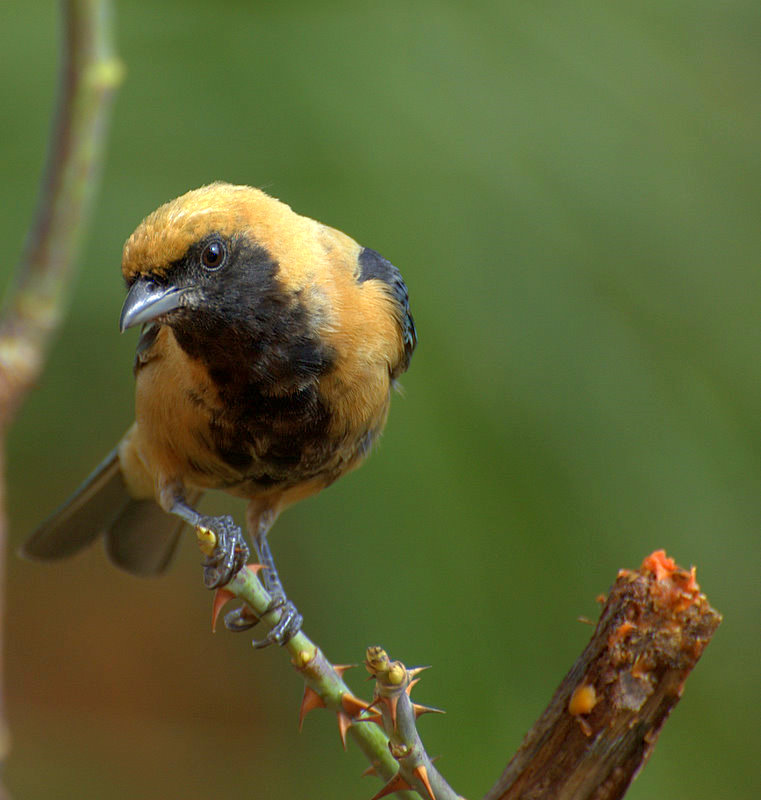
- Male (flava group) in São Paulo, Brazil

Conservation status
- Least Concern (IUCN 3.1)

Scientific classification
- Kingdom: Animalia
- Phylum: Chordata
- Class: Aves
- Order: Passeriformes
- Family: Thraupidae
- Genus: Stilpnia
- Species: S. cayana

Binomial name
- Stilpnia cayana (Linnaeus, 1766)

Synonyms
- Tanagra cayana Linnaeus, 1766

= Burnished-buff tanager =

Species of bird

The burnished-buff tanager (Stilpnia cayana), also known as the rufous-crowned tanager, is a common South American species of bird in the family Thraupidae.

== Distribution and habitat ==
It is found in the northern Guianas, most of Venezuela, and east-central Colombia; also near the Amazon River outlet in Brazil, as well as most of the east of that country, Paraguay, and northeast Argentina. It also occurs very locally in Bolivia and Peru. It can be seen in virtually any semi-open habitat with trees, including human-altered habitats such as gardens, plantations, and parks.

== Description ==
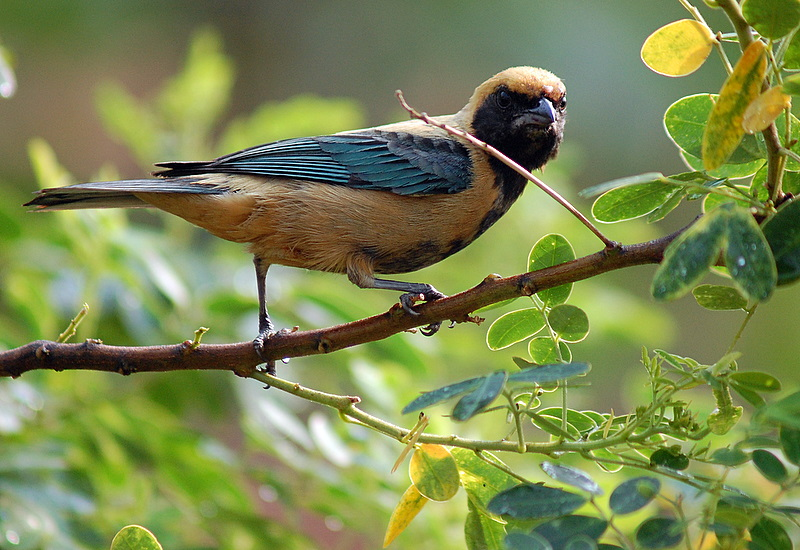
Male (flava group) in São Paulo, Brazil

There are several subspecies of the burnished-buff tanager, falling into two main groups: the northern and western cayana group, and the southern and eastern flava group. The subspecies huberi from Marajó Island is intermediate between the two main groups. Males of the cayana group have an orange-rufous crown, black mask, and cream underparts distinctly tinged blue on the throat and chest. Males of the flava group have an orange-buff crown and buff underparts with a black patch extending from the mask, over the throat and central chest, to the mid-belly. Males of both groups have turquoise wings and tail. Females are duller than the males, and have black restricted to a poorly demarcated "shadow" of a mask.

== Diet and behaviour ==
It is generally common, and usually seen singly or in pairs. As with all tanagers, it is a largely frugivorous species, being particularly fond of the fruits of the native Cecropia and Brazilian pepper as well as that of introduced Magnoliaceae such as Michelia champaca.

== Taxonomy ==
The burnished-buff tanager was formally described in 1766 by the Swedish naturalist Carl Linnaeus in the 12th edition of his Systema Naturae under the binomial name Tanagra cayana. The specific epithet is the Latin form of the type locality, Cayenne in French Guiana. The burnished-buff tanager was formerly placed in the genus Tangara. It was moved to the genus Stilpnia that was introduced in 2016.

Seven subspecies are recognised:

- S. c. fulvescens(Todd, 1922) – central Colombia
- S. c. cayana (Linnaeus, 1766) – east Colombia and Venezuela, the Guianas, and north Brazil; also east Peru, north Bolivia, and west-central Brazil
- S. c. huberi (Hellmayr, 1910) – Marajó
- S. c. flava (Gmelin, JF, 1789) – east Brazil
- S. c. sincipitalis (Berlepsch, 1907) – east-central Brazil
- S. c. chloroptera (Vieillot, 1819) – southeast Brazil, Paraguay, and Argentina
- S. c. margaritae (Allen, JA, 1891) – southwest Brazil
