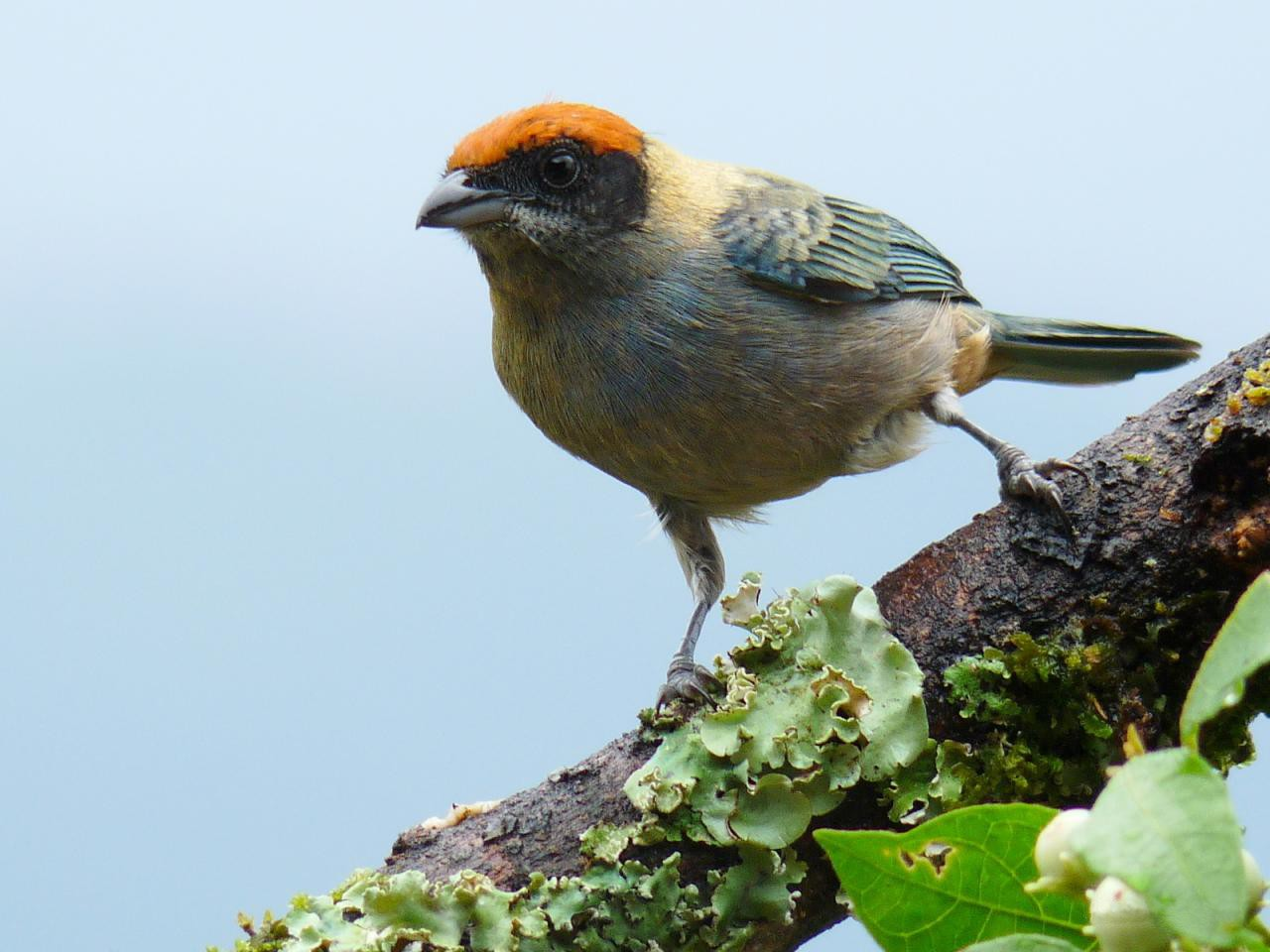
- In Colombia

Conservation status
- Least Concern (IUCN 3.1)

Scientific classification
- Kingdom: Animalia
- Phylum: Chordata
- Class: Aves
- Order: Passeriformes
- Family: Thraupidae
- Genus: Stilpnia
- Species: S. vitriolina

Binomial name
- Stilpnia vitriolina (Cabanis, 1851)

= Scrub tanager =

Species of bird

The scrub tanager (Stilpnia vitriolina) is a species of bird in the family Thraupidae.

It is found in Colombia and Ecuador. Its natural habitats are subtropical or tropical moist montane forests, subtropical or tropical high-altitude shrubland, and heavily degraded former forest.
