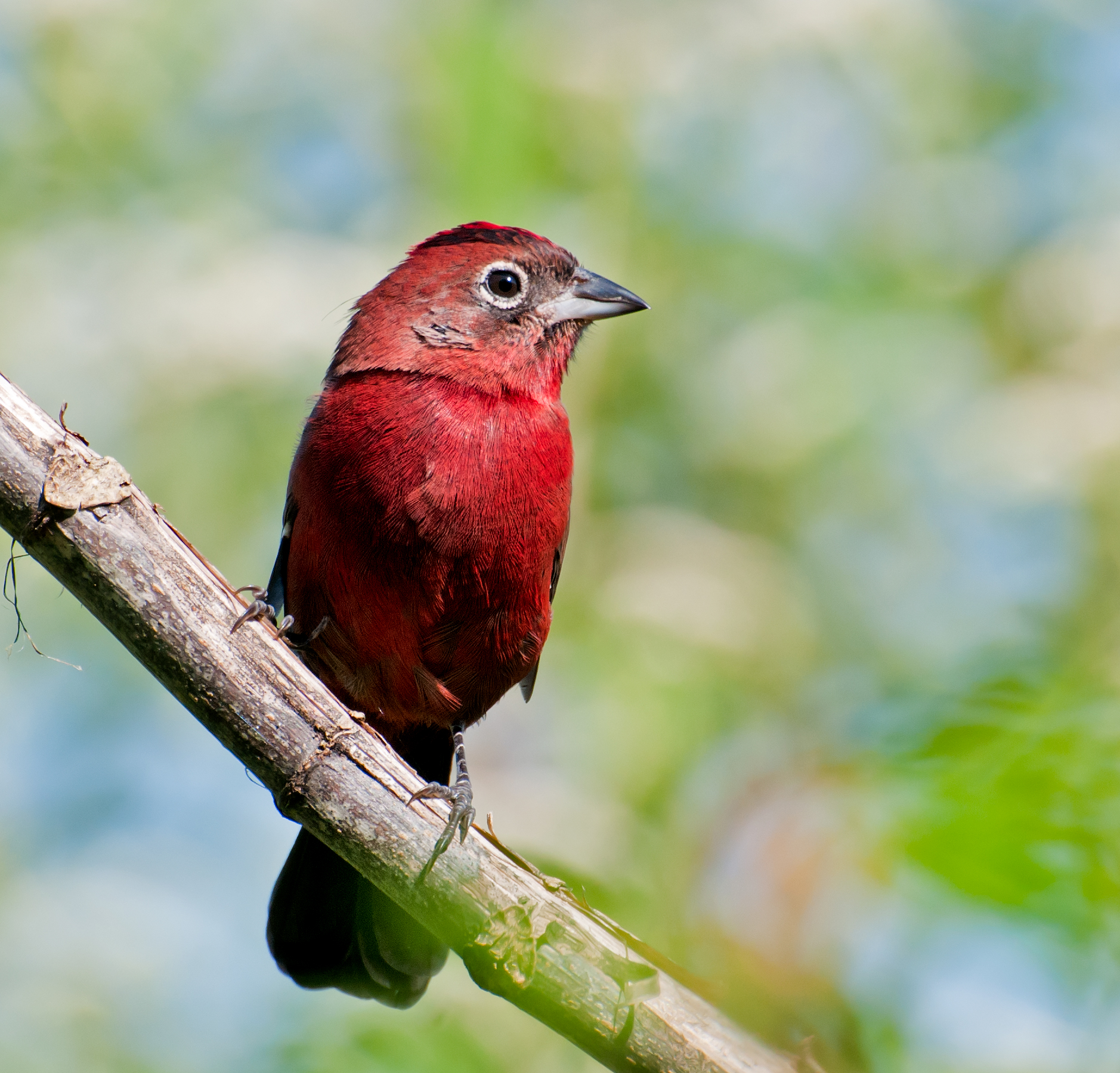

Conservation status
- Least Concern (IUCN 3.1)

Scientific classification
- Kingdom: Animalia
- Phylum: Chordata
- Class: Aves
- Order: Passeriformes
- Family: Thraupidae
- Genus: Coryphospingus
- Species: C. cucullatus

Binomial name
- Coryphospingus cucullatus (Müller, PLS, 1776)

= Red pileated finch =

Species of bird

The red pileated finch (Coryphospingus cucullatus), also known as the red-crested finch, is a species of bird in the family Thraupidae, the tanagers and allies. It is found in Argentina, Bolivia, Brazil, Colombia, Ecuador, Paraguay, Peru, Uruguay, and possibly Guyana and Suriname.

== Taxonomy and systematics ==
The red pileated finch was first described in 1776 by the German zoologist Philipp Ludwig Statius Müller with the binomial Fringilla cucullata. In 1851 Jean Cabanis erected the genus Coryphospingus for cuculatus and what is now the grey pileated finch (C. pileatus). The old and new genera were in the finch family Fringillidae but several early twentieth century studies showed that Coryphospingus belonged in its present tanager family. The two pileated "finches" form a superspecies and hybridize where their ranges overlap. The genera Coryphospingus, Lanio, Eucometis, and Tachyphonus are closely related.

The red pileated finch has these three subspecies:

- C. c. cucullatus (Müller, PLS, 1776)
- C. c. rubescens (Swainson, 1825)
- C. c. fargoi Brodkorb, 1938

== Description ==
The red pileated finch is about 13.5 cm (5.3 in) long and weighs 11 to 18 g (0.39 to 0.63 oz). It has a shortish tail and a longish bill. The species is sexually dimorphic. Adult males of the nominate subspecies C. c. cucullatus have a black crest with a red central stripe; the crest is usually held flat. Their face is grayish with white crescents above and below the eye and usually browner ear coverts. Their nape and upperparts are warm brown and their wings and tail a blackish brown. Their throat is red, their breast a richer red, and the rest of their underparts mostly reddish with a gray wash on the flanks. Adult females have a brown head with no red or black but with the same eye crescents as males. Their upperparts, wings, and tail are brown with a reddish wash on the rump. Their underparts are a paler brown with a reddish wash on the breast. Juveniles are similar to adult females but are slightly more olive and have some streaking on the underparts. Subspecies C. c. rubescens has richer red underparts and a smaller and thinner bill than the nominate. C. c. fargoi has browner, less reddish upperparts and duller red underparts than the nominate. Both sexes of all subspecies have a dark brown iris, a blackish maxilla, a horn to pale bluish gray mandible, and brownish legs.

== Distribution and habitat ==
The red pileated finch has a highly disjunct distribution: Each subspecies is separate from the others and some have gaps within their ranges. They are found thus:

- C. c. cucullatus: south of the Amazon River in northeastern Brazil's eastern Pará (but see below)
- C. c. rubescens: southern Brazil south and west of an arc roughly from Rondônia east to Goiás and western Minas Gerais and then south to the Atlantic in São Paulo state and into eastern Paraguay, Uruguay, and northeastern Argentina
- C. c. fargoi has multiple separate subranges: Marañón River valley in extreme southern Ecuador's Zamora-Chinchipe Province, upper Marañón valley straddling the Cajamarca - Amazonas border in northwestern Peru, Urubamba River valley in southeastern Peru's Cuzco Department, and in Bolivia, western Paraguay, and northern Argentina south to northern Buenos Aires Province. (but see below)

Birds of the World states that C. c. cucullatus is found in Guyana and that there are historical records in Suriname. However, the South American Classification Committee (SACC) has no records in Guyana and only unconfirmed reports in Suriname. The SACC and AviList place C. c. fargoi also in Colombia. The IUCN, the IOC, Birds of the World, and McMullan's Field Guide to the Birds of Colombia do not.

All three subspecies of the red pileated finch inhabit somewhat dry and open landscapes. These include shrubby areas, woodlands, the edges of gallery forest, savanna, Gran Chaco woodland, and agricultural areas; it also inhabits parks, gardens, and the edges of built-up areas. In elevation it ranges from sea level to 1,500 m (4,900 ft) in Brazil. It is found between 1,100 and 1,400 m (3,600 and 4,600 ft) in Ecuador, between 400 and 700 m (1,300 and 2,300 ft) in northern Peru, and between 700 and 2,200 m (2,300 and 7,200 ft) in southern Peru. It reaches 3,100 m (10,200 ft) in Bolivia.

== Behavior ==
=== Movement ===
The red pileated finch is overall a year-round resident though some birds in the far south are thought to move north for the austral winter. This article's map (from IUCN) shows a non-breeding range in Bolivia and Brazil north of the year-round range. However, the map in van Perlo's field guide shows the species' range as entirely year-round.

=== Feeding ===
The red pileated finch's diet has not been studied. It forages on the ground near, under, and in shrubs and other low vegetation. It usually is seen singly or in pairs but might form small flocks in the non-breeding season.

=== Breeding ===
The red pileated finch breeds mostly between November and February. Its nest is a cup made from a variety of plant fibers, lichens, and spider web. It is typically well hidden in dense foliage between about 1.5 and 1.8 m (5 and 6 ft) above the ground. The clutch is two or three unmarked white eggs. The incubation period, time to fledging, and details of parental care are not known

=== Vocalization ===
The red pileated finch's song is "a musical 2- or 3-note series: chidut-WEET chidut-WEET chidut-WEET...". Its calls are "a sharp twiip! or slightly lower-pitched phfft".

== Status ==
The IUCN has assessed the red pileated finch as being of Least Concern. It has a very large range; its population size is not known but is believed to be stable. No immediate threats have been identified. It is considered "fairly common but patchily distributed" in Peru and "common to frequent" in Brazil. "This species may benefit greatly from areas of forest giving way to second growth, and perhaps even from agricultural expansion in native grasslands."
