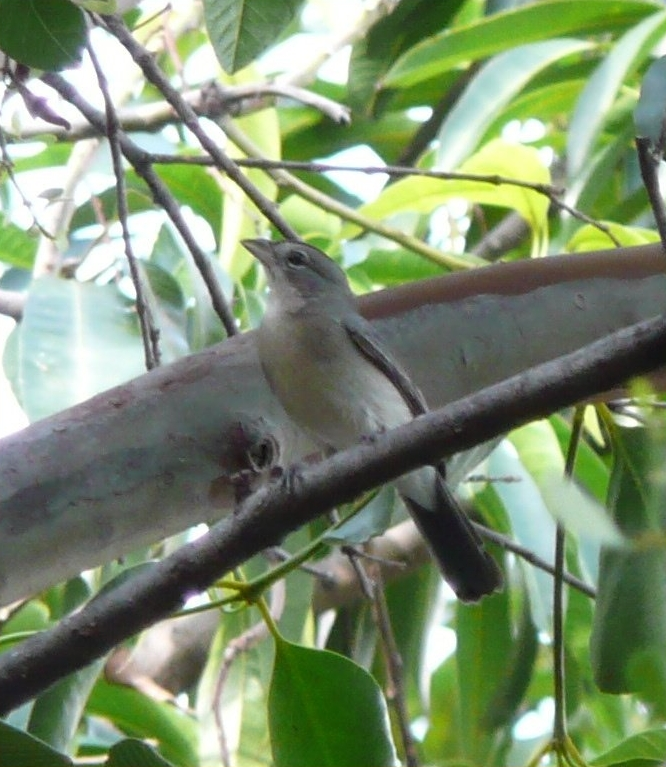

Conservation status
- Least Concern (IUCN 3.1)

Scientific classification
- Kingdom: Animalia
- Phylum: Chordata
- Class: Aves
- Order: Passeriformes
- Family: Thraupidae
- Genus: Coryphospingus
- Species: C. pileatus

Binomial name
- Coryphospingus pileatus (Wied-Neuwied, M, 1821)

= Grey pileated finch =

Species of bird

The grey pileated finch (Coryphospingus pileatus), also known as the pileated finch, is a species of bird in the family Thraupidae, the tanagers and allies. It is found in Brazil, Colombia, Venezuela, and possibly Bolivia and French Guiana.

== Taxonomy and systematics ==
The grey pileated finch was first described in 1821 by the German naturalist Prince Maximilian of Wied-Neuwied with the binomial Fringilla pileata. In 1851 Jean Cabanis erected the genus Coryphospingus for pileatus and what is now the red pileated finch (C. cucullatus). The old and new genera were in the finch family Fringillidae but several early twentieth century studies showed that Coryphospingus belonged in its present tanager family. The two pileated "finches" form a superspecies and hybridize where their ranges overlap. The genera Coryphospingus, Lanio, Eucometis, and Tachyphonus are closely related.

The grey pileated finch has these three subspecies:

- C. p. rostratus Miller, AH, 1947
- C. p. brevicaudus Cory, 1916
- C. p. pileatus (Wied-Neuwied, M, 1821)

== Description ==
The grey pileated finch is about 13.5 cm (5.3 in) long and weighs 12 to 18 g (0.42 to 0.63 oz). It has a shortish tail and a longish bill. The species is sexually dimorphic. Adult males of the nominate subspecies C. p. pileatus have a black crest with a red central stripe; the crest is usually held flat. Their face is gray with white crescents above and below the eye. Their nape and upperparts are grayish and their wings and tail blackish gray. Their throat is white and their underparts mostly whitish with a dull grayish wash on the sides and flanks. Adult females have a brownish crown with no red. Their face is grayish brown with the same eye crescents as males. Their upperparts, wings, and tail are grayish brown and their underparts mostly off-white with buff-gray flanks. Juveniles are similar to adult females but are slightly more olive and have some streaking on the underparts. Subspecies C. p. rostratus has the same plumage than the nominate but a visibly longer bill and a shorter tail. C. p. brevicaudus has paler lores than the nominate and a shorter tail. Both sexes of all subspecies have a dark iris, a blackish maxilla, a horn to grayish mandible, and dark gray legs.

== Distribution and habitat ==
The grey pileated finch has a highly disjunct distribution: Each subspecies is separate from the others. They are found thus:

- C. p. rostratus: central Colombia in the upper valley of the Magdalena River
- C. p. brevicaudus: the isolated Sierra Nevada de Santa Marta in northern Colombia and east into Venezuela, where it is found across northern Zulia, Falcón, and northern Lara states, east to Sucre state, and south into Apure and northern Bolívar states; also Margarita Island
- C. p. pileatus: central and eastern Brazil south of a line roughly from western Mato Grosso northeast to the Atlantic in Maranhão and north of a line roughly from Mato Grosso southeast to the Atlantic in southern Rio de Janeiro state

The South American Classification Committee also has unconfirmed records in Bolivia and French Guiana.

All three subspecies of the grey pileated finch primarily inhabit dry and somewhat open landscapes. These include scrublands, thorn scrub, and open woodlands; it also inhabits shrubby edges of moister woodlands including gallery forest and grassy edges along roads. In elevation it reaches 400 m (1,300 ft) in Colombia and 1,000 m (3,300 ft) in Brazil. In Venezuela it is found up to 750 m (2,500 ft) north of the Orinoco River and only to 100 m (300 ft) south of it.

== Behavior ==
=== Movement ===
The grey pileated finch is overall a year-round resident though some seasonal movements are suspected in Venezuela.

=== Feeding ===
The grey pileated finch's diet has not been studied. One source states that it feeds on seeds. It forages on the ground near or under shrubs and other low vegetation. In the non-breeding season it forms small flocks.

=== Breeding ===
The grey pileated finch's breeding season has not been fully defined. In Venezuela it breeds during the rainy season of April or May to October or November. In central Colombia it appears to span at least October to December. Nothing else is known about the species' breeding biology.

=== Vocalization ===
The grey pileated finch's song in Venezuela is not frequently heard, "a leisurely [series] of flat, almost vireolike phrases, tslip, tslip tsweet, tslip tslip tsweet". In Brazil it sings a "calm, 2-noted phrase, 1st part [extremely] high, fast gliding-up sweéf, 2nd part mid-high trru or tudu, together as sweéf-trru repeated 8-10 x". Its calls are "a sharp twiip! or slightly lower-pitched phfft".

== Status ==
The IUCN has assessed the grey pileated finch as being of Least Concern. It has an extremely large range; its population size is not known but is believed to be stable. No immediate threats have been identified. It is considered "nowhere very numerous" in Venezuela, "locally common" in Colombia, and "common to frequent" in Brazil.
