= Trichothraupis griseonota =

Scientific classification
- Kingdom: Animalia
- Phylum: Chordata
- Class: Aves
- Order: Passeriformes
- Family: Thraupidae
- Genus: Trichothraupis
- Species: T. griseonota

Binomial name
- Trichothraupis griseonota Cavarzere, Costa, Cabanne, Trujillo-Arias, Marcondes, & Silveira, 2024

Species of bird

Trichothraupis griseonota is a species of bird in the Thraupidae family native to the Andes, closely related to or a subspecies of the black-goggled tanager.

== Description ==
According to the 2024 study which identified the species, the population exhibits multiple differences from other birds in the otherwise monotypical genus Trichothraupis. This led to the bird being distinguished as a new species. All major ornithological authorities (as of February 2026) treat this bird as a subspecies of the black-goggled tanager (T. melanops).
