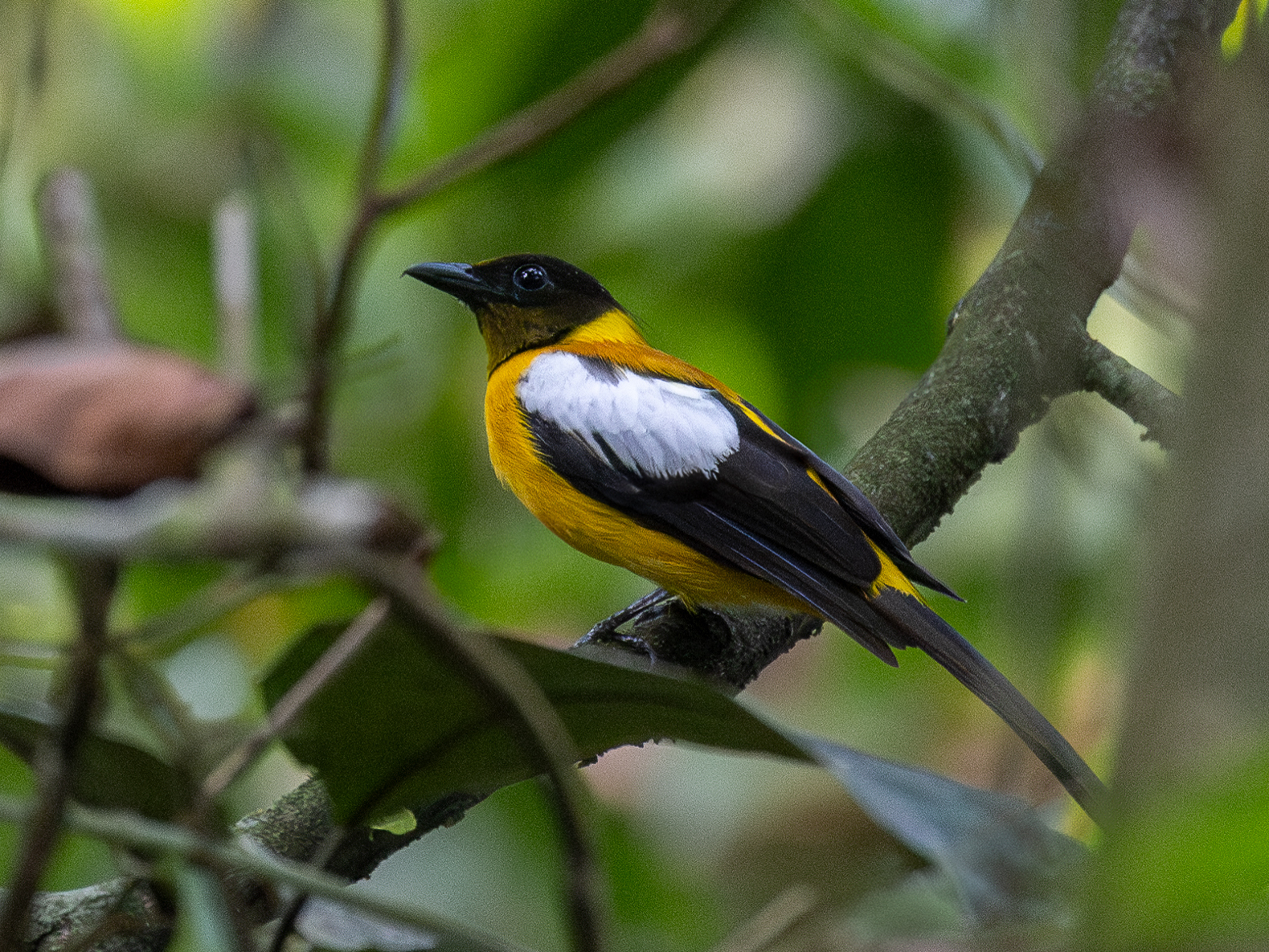
- Male at Atalaia do Norte, Amazonas state, Brazil

Conservation status
- Least Concern (IUCN 3.1)

Scientific classification
- Kingdom: Animalia
- Phylum: Chordata
- Class: Aves
- Order: Passeriformes
- Family: Thraupidae
- Genus: Lanio
- Species: L. versicolor

Binomial name
- Lanio versicolor (D'Orbigny & Lafresnaye, 1837)

= White-winged shrike-tanager =

Species of bird

The white-winged shrike-tanager (Lanio versicolor) is a species of bird in the family Thraupidae, the tanagers and allies. It is found in Bolivia, Brazil, and Peru.

== Taxonomy and systematics ==
The white-winged shrike-tanager was formally described in 1837 with the binomial Tachyphonus versicolor. It was eventually reassigned to its current genus Lanio that had been erected in 1816. Late in the twentieth century it and the fulvous shrike-tanager (L. fulvus) were treated as a superspecies but twenty-first century studies refuted that treatment.

The white-winged shrike-tanager has two subspecies, the nominate L. v. versicolor (D'Orbigny & Lafresnaye, 1837) and L. v. parvus (Berlepsch, 1912).

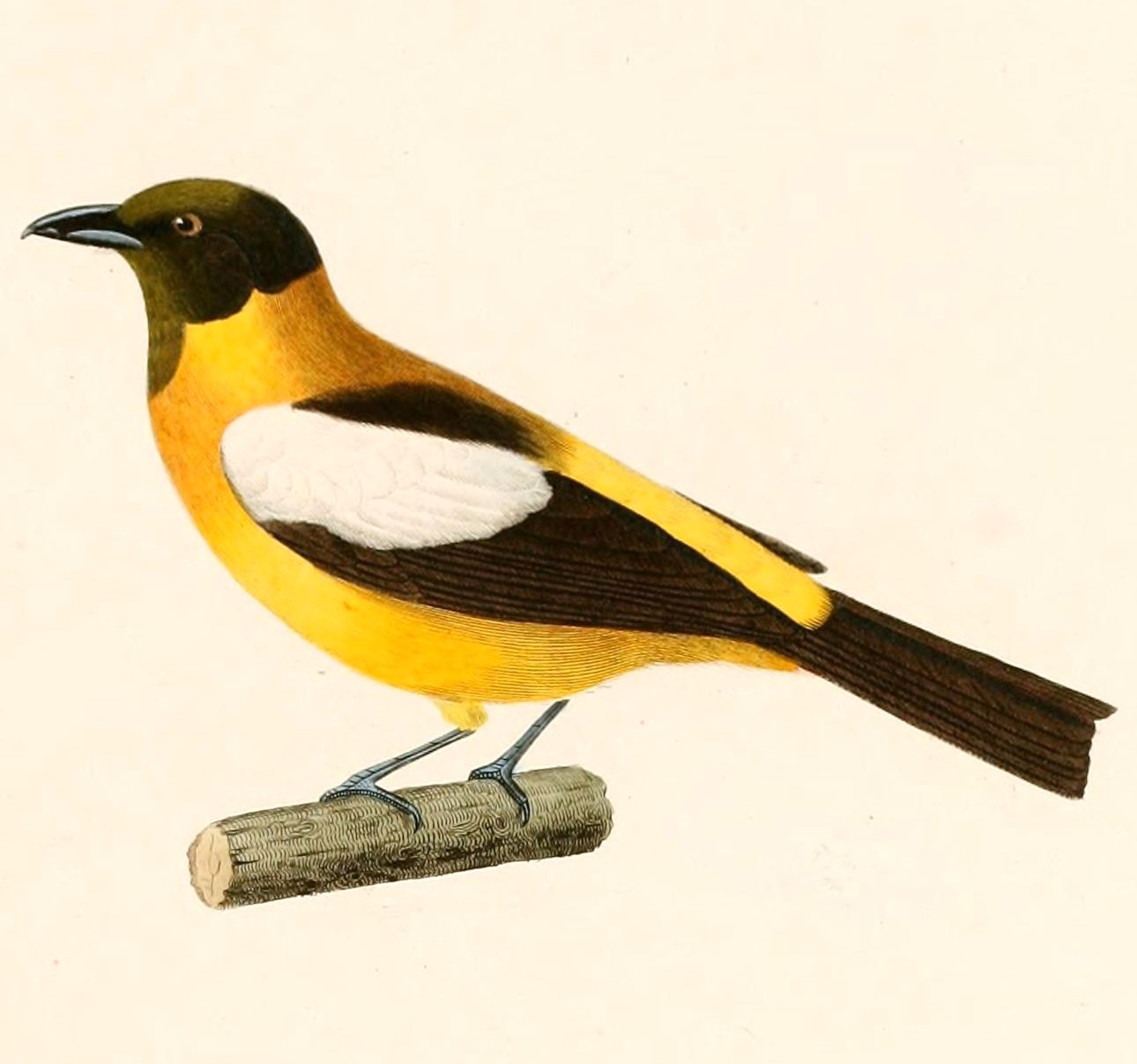
L. versicolor, 1847

== Description ==
The white-winged shrike-tanager is 13 to 15 cm (5.1 to 5.9 in) long and weighs about 17 g (0.60 oz). It has a shrike-like "toothed" bill with a hooked end. The species is sexually dimorphic. Adult males of the nominate subspecies have a mostly black head with an olive forecrown. Their body is mostly ochraceous yellow with darker mottling on the rump, breast, and throat. Their wings are black with much white on the upperwing coverts and their tail is black. Adult females are mostly ochraceous brown with an ochraceous yellow belly. Subspecies L. v. parvus is much smaller than the nominate but has essentially the same plumage. Both sexes of both subspecies have a brown iris, a long black hooked bill, and black legs.

== Distribution and habitat ==
The nominate subspecies of the white-winged shrike-tanager is the more westerly of the two. It in found in eastern Peru from south of the Marañón and Amazon rivers in southwestern Loreto Department south to northern Puno Department and from there east into northwestern Bolivia and western Brazil south of the Amazon to the Madeira and Tapajós rivers. Subspecies L. v. parvus is found in Brazil south of the Amazon and east of the Madeira and Tapajós. The species' southern limit in Brazil is a line roughly from north-central Mato Grosso do Sul northeast almost to the Atlantic in northeastern Pará.

The white-winged shrike-tanager primarily inhabits intact terra firme forest. It also occurs in evergreen forest and gallery forest. In elevation it reaches 900 m (3,000 ft) in Brazil and 1,200 m (3,900 ft) in Peru.

== Behavior ==
=== Movement ===
The white-winged shrike-tanager is a year-round resident.

=== Feeding ===
The white-winged shrike-tanager feeds primarily on arthropods but includes some fruit in its diet. It forages mostly in the forest canopy. Pairs of the species usually lead a mixed-species feeding flock which remains together year-round. It takes much prey disturbed by the flock in mid-air and also takes some with a sally from a perch to the underside of foliage. It takes fruit while perched. In flocks it is the primary sentinel as well as leader, giving alarm calls when a potential threat such as an accipiter approaches. It has been observed giving false alarms and then capturing prey abandoned by fleeing flock-mates.

=== Breeding ===
The white-winged shrike-tanager's breeding season is not known but includes November in Peru. The one known nest was a cup made from plant fibers on a base of twigs and dead leaves. It was about 1 m (3 ft) above the ground in an epiphyte on the trunk of a tree. It held two nestlings that were being fed by both parents. Nothing else is known about the species' breeding biology.

=== Vocalization ===
The white-winged shrike-tanager's song is described as "a pleasant musical series, for example tur-ree-tur pe'chew" and its call as "a piercing t'SEER or TSEW!". They are also described, respectively, as a "very high tjee-tje-je-neet?" and an extremely high sweéh.

== Status ==
The IUCN has assessed the white-winged shrike-tanager as being of Least Concern. It has a very large range; its population size is not known and is believed to be decreasing. No immediate threats have been identified. It is considered "uncommon but widespread" in Peru and "frequent to uncommon" in Brazil.
