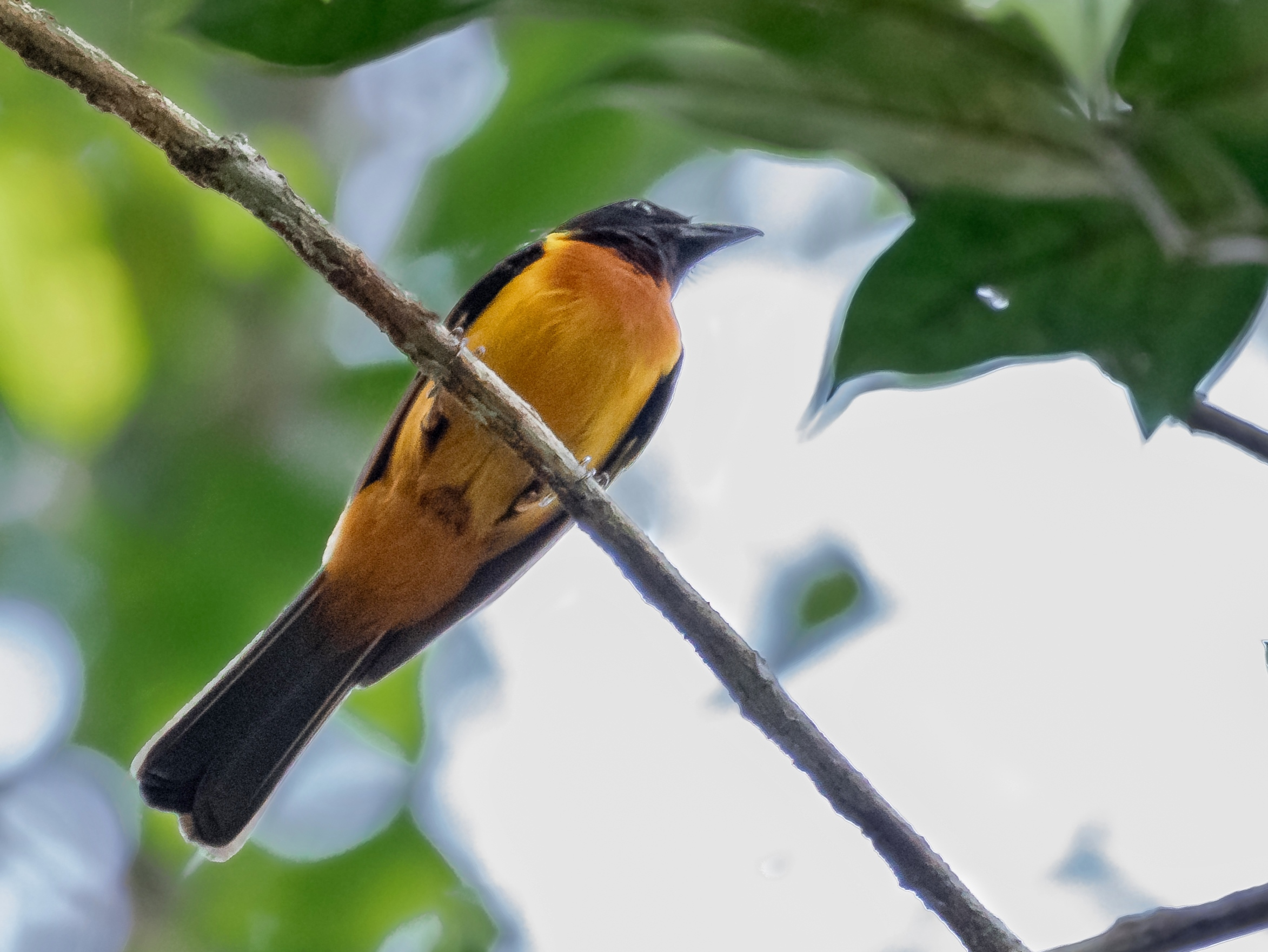

Conservation status
- Least Concern (IUCN 3.1)

Scientific classification
- Kingdom: Animalia
- Phylum: Chordata
- Class: Aves
- Order: Passeriformes
- Family: Thraupidae
- Genus: Lanio
- Species: L. fulvus

Binomial name
- Lanio fulvus (Boddaert, 1783)

= Fulvous shrike-tanager =

Species of bird

The fulvous shrike-tanager (Lanio fulvus) is a species of bird in the family Thraupidae, the tanagers and allies. It is found in Brazil, Colombia, Ecuador, French Guiana, Guyana, Peru, Suriname, and Venezuela.

== Taxonomy and systematics ==
The fulvous shrike-tanager was described by the French polymath Georges-Louis Leclerc, Comte de Buffon in 1779 in his Histoire Naturelle des Oiseaux from a specimen collected in Cayenne, the then-current name for French Guiana. The bird was also illustrated in a hand-colored plate engraved by François-Nicolas Martinet in the Planches Enluminées D'Histoire Naturelle which was produced under the supervision of Edme-Louis Daubenton to accompany Buffon's text. Neither the plate caption nor Buffon's description included a scientific name but in 1783 the Dutch naturalist Pieter Boddaert coined the binomial name Tangara fulva in his catalogue of the Planches Enluminées. In 1816 the French ornithologist Louis Pierre Vieillot erected the genus Lanio with the fulvous shrike-tanager as the type species. The genus name is derived from the shrike genus Lanius that had been introduced by the Swedish naturalist Carl Linnaeus in 1758 in the tenth edition of his Systema Naturae. The specific epithet fulvus is Latin for "tawny", "brown" or "fulvous". Late in the twentieth century the fulvous shrike-tanager and the white-winged shrike-tanager (L. versicolor) were treated as a superspecies but twenty-first century studies refuted that treatment.

The fulvous shrike-tanager has two subspecies, the nominate L. f. fulvus (Boddaert, 1783) and L. f. peruvianus (Carriker, 1934).

== Description ==
The fulvous shrike-tanager is 15 to 17 cm (5.9 to 6.7 in) long and weighs 19 to 30 g (0.67 to 1.1 oz). It has a shrike-like "toothed" bill with a hooked end. The species is sexually dimorphic. Adult males of the nominate subspecies have a black head, throat, wings, and tail. Their body is mostly dark yellowish orange that is brighter yellow on the nape and a dark tawny rufous on the rump, breast, and crissum. Their underwing coverts are white. Adult females have a gray-brown head, a rufous brown back, and a rich rufous rump. Their wings and tail are rufous brown. Their throat is buffy and their underparts mostly pale ochraceous with a bright yellow middle of the belly and the crissum. Males of subspecies L. f. peruvianus have paler and more uniform yellow upperparts than the nominate. Females have a dull rufous brown throat and a paler more olive-brown back and browner breast than the nominate. Both sexes of both subspecies have a reddish brown to dark brown iris and a long black hooked bill. Males have blackish legs; females' are brownish gray to pinkish gray.

== Distribution and habitat ==
The fulvous shrike-tanager is a bird of the northern Amazon Basin and the Guiana Shield. Subspecies L. f. peruvianus is the more westerly of the two. It is found from southeastern Táchira in western Venezuela south along the east side of Colombia's Eastern Andes and east from there across far southern Colombia. From Colombia its range continues south through eastern Ecuador into northern Peru, where it reaches the Marañón and Amazon rivers but only slightly crosses the former in northern San Martín Department. The nominate subspecies is found in eastern Venezuela from southern Delta Amacuro south through eastern Bolívar and southern Amazonas states. From Venezuela its range continues east through the Guianas and northern Brazil north of the Amazon almost to the Atlantic in Amapá. The map shows a corridor along the Amazon from southeastern Colombia and northeastern Peru to the rest of the species' Brazilian range; it is not clear from the available descriptions which subspecies inhabits it.

The fulvous shrike-tanager primarily inhabits intact terra firme forest and occurs less commonly in várzea forest. In elevation it occurs below 500 m (1,600 ft) in Colombia, mostly below 1,100 m (3,600 ft) in Ecuador, below 1,350 m (4,400 ft) in Peru, and below 1,300 m (4,300 ft) in Brazil. In Venezuela it is found between 350 and 950 m (1,100 and 3,100 ft) in Táchira and below 1,300 m (4,300 ft) in the east.

== Behavior ==
=== Movement ===
The fulvous shrike-tanager is a year-round resident.

=== Feeding ===
The fulvous shrike-tanager feeds primarily on arthropods but includes some fruit in its diet. It forages mostly just under the forest canopy. About half of the time pairs of the species lead a mixed-species feeding flock, and may switch flocks that pass each other. It takes much prey disturbed by the flock in mid-air and takes the rest principally by gleaning from foliage. It takes fruit while perched. In flocks it is a sentinel as well as leader, giving alarm calls when a potential threat such as an accipiter approaches. It has been observed giving false alarms and then capturing prey abandoned by fleeing flock-mates.

=== Breeding ===
The fulvous shrike-tanager's breeding season has not been defined but includes October in French Guiana. Nothing else is known about the species' breeding biology.

=== Vocalization ===
One description of the fulvous shrike-tanager's calls is "a piercing TCHEW, also a light chatter". Its song is "a lisping, rising series of high, thin whistles interspersed with call notes: wsss-tew wsss-tew wsss-tew ...TCHEW".

== Status ==
The IUCN has assessed the fulvous shrike-tanager as being of Least Concern. It has a very large range; its population size is not known and is believed to be decreasing. No immediate threats have been identified. It is considered "uncommon" in Colombia, "uncommon but widespread" in Peru, "fairly common to common" in Venezuela, and "frequent to uncommon" in Brazil. "Although the species is of Least Concern, the thin strip of land that it occupies from western Venezuela through Colombia to Ecuador is subject to deforestation."
