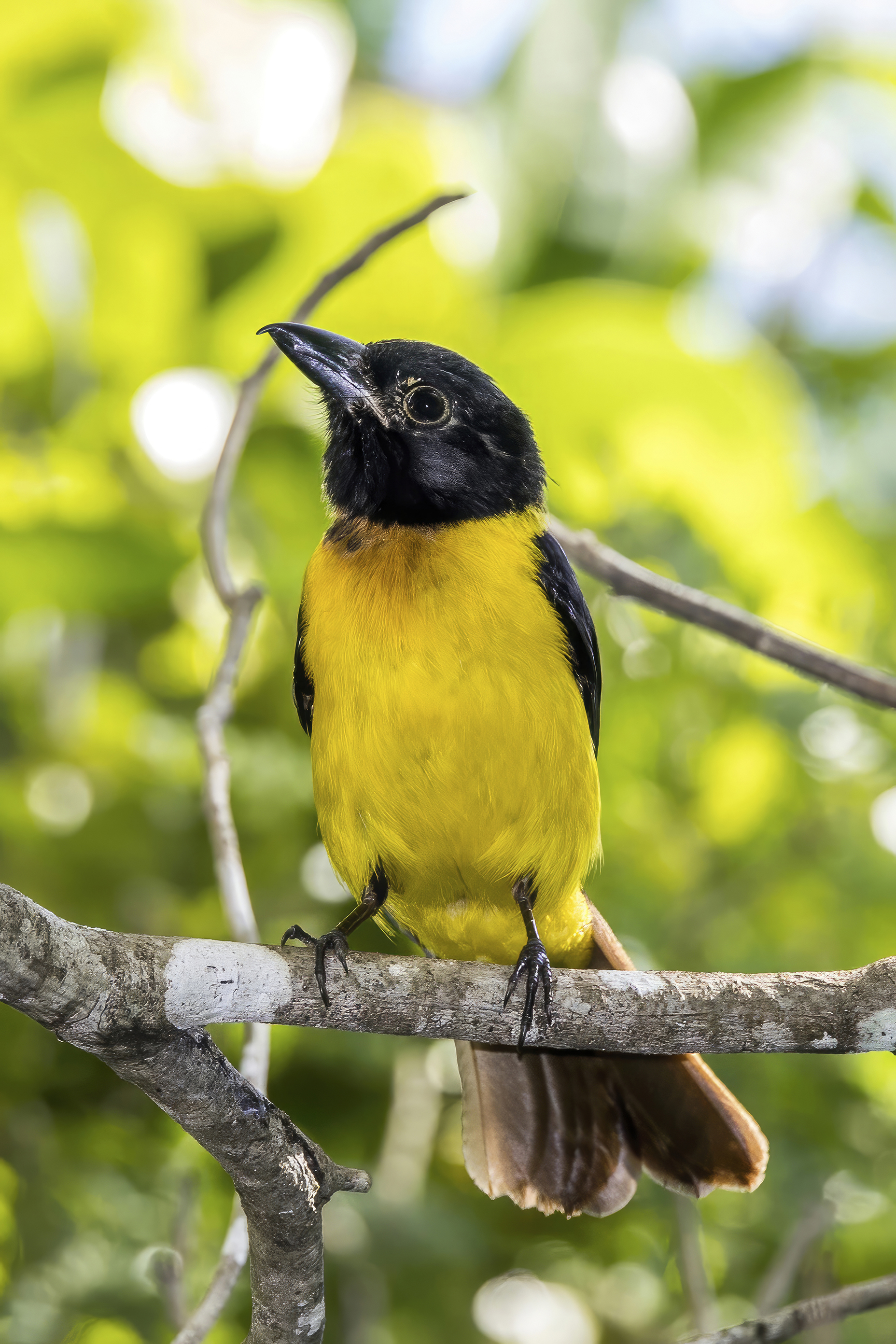
- Male black-throated shrike-tanager near Yaxhá, Peten, Guatemala

Conservation status
- Least Concern (IUCN 3.1)

Scientific classification
- Kingdom: Animalia
- Phylum: Chordata
- Class: Aves
- Order: Passeriformes
- Family: Thraupidae
- Genus: Lanio
- Species: L. aurantius

Binomial name
- Lanio aurantius Lafresnaye, 1846

= Black-throated shrike-tanager =

Species of bird

The black-throated shrike-tanager (Lanio aurantius) is a species of bird in the family Thraupidae, the tanagers and allies. It is found in Belize, Guatemala, Honduras, and Mexico.

== Taxonomy and systematics ==
The black-throated shrike-tanager was formally described in 1846 with the binomial Lanio Aurantius [sic]. For a time it and the white-throated shrike-tanager (L. leucothorax) were treated as conspecific. They form a superspecies.

The black-throated shrike-tanager is monotypic.

== Description ==
The black-throated shrike-tanager is 19 to 20 cm (7.5 to 7.9 in) long. It has a shrike-like "toothed" bill with a hooked end. The species is sexually dimorphic. Adult males have a bright yellow body with a faint brownish ochre wash on the breast. Their head, nape, throat, wings, and tail are black, with white tips on the lesser wing coverts. Adult females have a gray head with an olive tinge on the crown. Their upperparts, wings, and tail are tawny-brown with a strong rufescent tinge on the rump and tail. Their throat is gray, their breast and belly yellow, and their undertail coverts ochre. Their breast, sides, and flanks have an olive wash. Both sexes have a dark brown iris and blackish legs. Males have a black bill; females' are blackish.

== Distribution and habitat ==
The black-throated shrike-tanager is found on the Gulf/Caribbean slope from central Veracruz in southeastern Mexico east through Tabasco and Chiapas including the base of the Yucatán Peninsula and continuing east across northern Guatemala, south through western Belize and eastern Guatemala, and east into northwestern Honduras to Atlántida Department. It inhabits humid evergreen and semi-deciduous forest. Sources differ slightly on its upper elevational limit, stating it as 1,200 m (3,900 ft) and 1,250 m (4,100 ft).

== Behavior ==
=== Movement ===
The black-throated shrike-tanager is a year-round resident though some winter wandering has been suggested.

=== Feeding ===
The black-throated shrike tanager's diet has not been studied but is known to include insects. It primarily forages from the forest's mid-level to its canopy. Pairs are almost always members of a mixed-species feeding flock and often act as sentinels. It captures prey stirred up by the flock with a fast acrobatic chase.

=== Breeding ===
Nothing is known about the black-throated shrike-tanager's breeding biology.

=== Vocalization ===
The black-throated shrike-tanager's song is "a loud, 2-part, cheep-two! or peep-two-tu'tu'tu'tu'tu'tu". It also makes "a clear whistled peee'uuuu".

== Status ==
The IUCN has assessed the black-throated shrike-tanager as being of Least Concern. It has a large range; its estimated population of between 20,000 and 50,000 mature individuals is believed to be decreasing. No immediate threats have been identified. It is considered "locally fairly common" overall and "uncommon to fairly common" south of Mexico. It occurs in several protected areas and "this species’ long-term viability should be assured so long as protected areas in its range are maintained".
