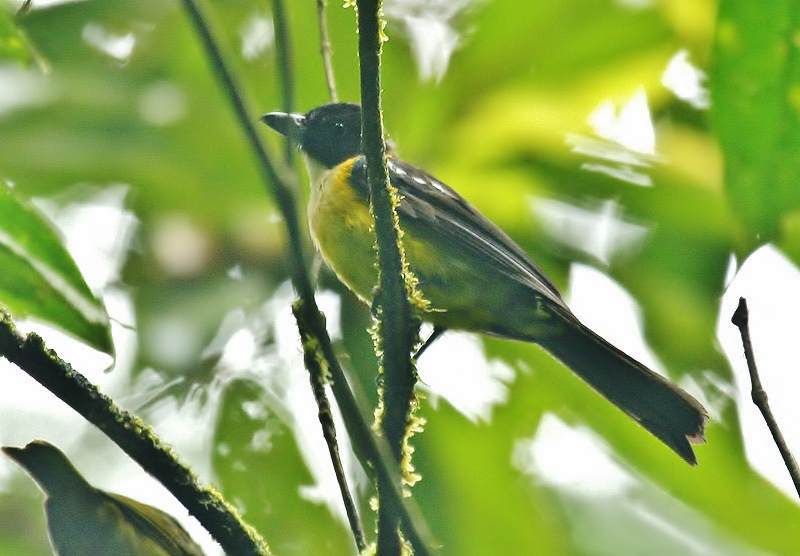

Conservation status
- Near Threatened (IUCN 3.1)

Scientific classification
- Kingdom: Animalia
- Phylum: Chordata
- Class: Aves
- Order: Passeriformes
- Family: Thraupidae
- Genus: Lanio
- Species: L. leucothorax

Binomial name
- Lanio leucothorax Salvin, 1865

= White-throated shrike-tanager =

Species of bird

The white-throated shrike-tanager (Lanio leucothorax) is a Near Threatened species of bird in the family Thraupidae, the tanagers and allies. It is found in Costa Rica, Honduras, Nicaragua, and Panama.

== Taxonomy and systematics ==
The white-throated shrike-tanager was formally described in 1865 with its present binomial Lanio leucothorax. For a time it and the black-throated shrike-tanager (L. aurantius) were treated as conspecific. They form a superspecies.

The white-throated shrike-tanager has these four subspecies:

- L. l. leucothorax Salvin, 1865
- L. l. reversus Bangs & Griscom, 1932
- L. l. melanopygius Salvin & Godman, 1883
- L. l. ictus Kennard & Peters, JL, 1927

== Description ==
The white-throated shrike-tanager is about 20 cm (7.9 in) long and weighs 30 to 45 g (1.1 to 1.6 oz). It has a shrike-like "toothed" bill with a hooked end. The species is sexually dimorphic. Adult males of the nominate subspecies L. l. leucothorax have rich yellow upperparts. Their head, nape, wings, and tail are black, with white on the lesser wing coverts. Their chin is black, their throat white, their breast buff-tinged white, their belly and undertail coverts bright yellow, their thighs black, and their underwing coverts white. Adult females have a grayish brown head with a dusky tinge on the ear coverts. Their upperparts are reddish brown. Their wings and tail are dusky with wide brown feather edges. Their throat and upper breast are buffy brown with a gray tinge, their lower breast is olive, and their belly golden yellow. Their sides, flanks, and undertail coverts are pale cinnamon.

The other subspecies of the white-throated shrike-tanager differ from the nominate and each other thus:

- L. l. melanopygius: male has black lower back, lower belly, and undertail coverts; female has paler brownish gray throat than nominate
- L. l. ictus: male like melanopygius with wide yellow tips on the rump feathers; female's throat is intermediate between nominate and melanopygius
- L. l. reversus: male has black rump, lower belly, and undertail coverts

Both sexes of all subspecies have a dark brown iris and blackish legs. Males have a black bill; females' are dusky.

== Distribution and habitat ==
The subspecies of the white-throated shrike-tanager are found thus:

- L. l. leucothorax: from Colón and Olancho departments in eastern Honduras south on the Caribbean slope through Nicaragua into Costa Rica to most of the length of Limón Province
- L. l. reversus: Las Agujas in western Costa Rica's northwestern Puntarenas Province
- L. l. melanopygius: Pacific slope from southern lip of the Gulf of Nicoya in Puntarenas Province south into western Panama's Chiriquí Province and on both Pacific and Caribbean slopes in Veraguas Province and the Caribbean slope in western Coclé Province
- L. l. ictus: area of Almirante Bay in northwestern Panama's Bocas del Toro Province

The white-throated shrike-tanager inhabits the interior of evergreen forest in the lowlands and foothills of the tropical and lower subtropical zones. Sources differ on its elevational limit. One states it is 750 m (2,500 ft) and a more recent one says 1,000 m (3,300 ft). Fagan's field guide it reaches 1,100 m (3,600 ft) in Honduras and Garrigues' guide lists it as 900 m (3,000 ft) in Costa Rica.

== Behavior ==
=== Movement ===
The white-throated shrike-tanager is a year-round resident.

=== Feeding ===
The white-throated shrike-tanager feeds primarily on insects and occasionally includes fruit in its diet. Pairs and small family groups almost always travel as members of a mixed-species feeding flock; the flock forages from the forest's mid-level to its canopy but most often in the subcanopy. The species often acts as a flock sentinel. It captures prey stirred up by the flock with a fast acrobatic chase.

=== Breeding ===
The white-throated shrike-tanager's breeding season includes May. The only known nest was in a low bush inside forest; it held two eggs that were white with dark spots. Nothing else is known about the species' breeding biology.

=== Vocalization ===
The white-throated shrike-tanager's song is "a deliberate and rather low-pitched series of melodic notes followed by some higher whistles". Its calls have been described as "a repeated peeuuu" and peet!-teeuu!". Another rendition of the second of these is "a two-note repetition (chit-chew, chit-chew...)".

== Status ==
The IUCN originally in 1988 assessed the white-throated shrike-tanager as being of Least Concern but since 2022 as Near Threatened. It has a large range; its estimated population of at least 50,000 mature individuals is believed to be decreasing. "Due to its high dependence on intact forests, the species is threatened by the loss, degradation and fragmentation of wet and humid forests within the range. Particularly outside of protected areas deforestation is intense, which has already led to local declines and extinctions." It is considered uncommon in Honduras and Costa Rica. It does occur in several protected areas.
