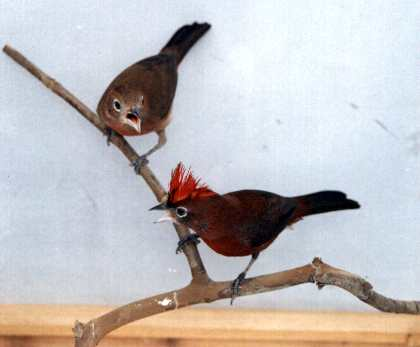
- Red pileated finch (Coryphospingus cucullatus)

Scientific classification
- Kingdom: Animalia
- Phylum: Chordata
- Class: Aves
- Order: Passeriformes
- Family: Thraupidae
- Genus: Coryphospingus; Cabanis, 1851

Type species
- Fringilla cristata = Fringilla cucullata Gmelin, 1789

Species
- Coryphospingus cucullatus Coryphospingus pileatus

= Coryphospingus =

Genus of birds

Coryphospingus is a small genus of finch-like tanagers found in South America. Coryphospingus was formerly classified in the family Emberizidae along with the buntings and American sparrows.

== Taxonomy and species list ==
The genus Coryphospingus was introduced in 1851 by the German ornithologist Jean Cabanis. The type species was designated as the red pileated finch by the English zoologist George Robert Gray in 1855. The genus name combines the Ancient Greek koruphē meaning "crown of the head" with spingos meaning "finch". The genus contains two species.

Genus Coryphospingus – Cabanis, 1851 – two species
Common name	Scientific name and subspecies	Range	Size and ecology	IUCN status and estimated population
Grey pileated finch	Coryphospingus pileatus (Wied, 1821)	Brazil, Colombia, French Guiana, and Venezuela	Size: Habitat: Diet:	LC
Red pileated finch	Coryphospingus cucullatus (Müller, 1776) Three subspecies: C. c. cucullatus; C. c. fargoi; C. c. rubescens	southern Brazil and northern Argentina	Size: Habitat: Diet:	LC
