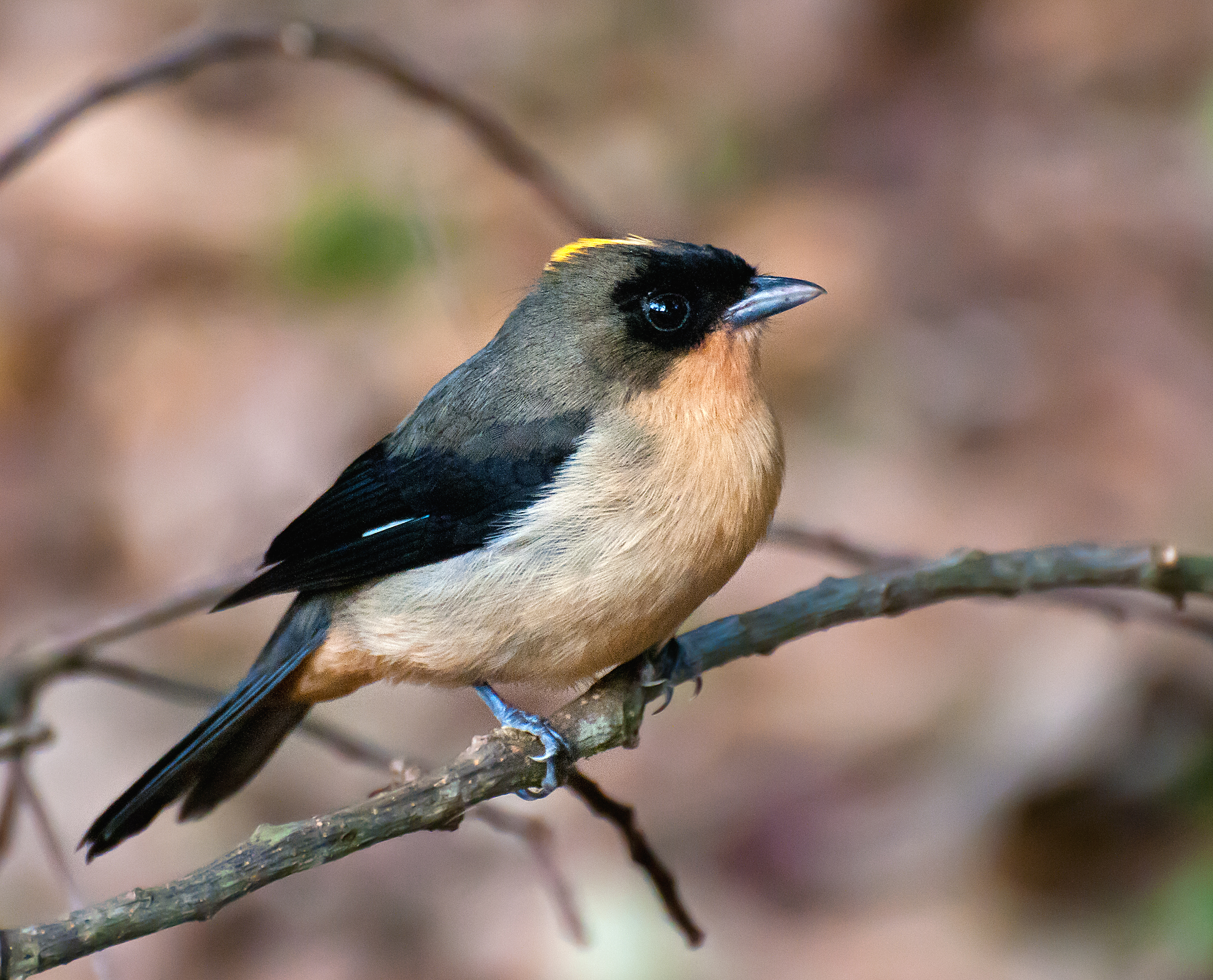

Conservation status
- Least Concern (IUCN 3.1)

Scientific classification
- Kingdom: Animalia
- Phylum: Chordata
- Class: Aves
- Order: Passeriformes
- Family: Thraupidae
- Genus: Trichothraupis; Cabanis, 1851
- Species: T. melanops

Binomial name
- Trichothraupis melanops (Vieillot, 1818)

= Black-goggled tanager =

Species of bird

The black-goggled tanager (Trichothraupis melanops) is a species of bird in the family Thraupidae, the tanagers and allies. It is found in Argentina, Bolivia, Brazil, Paraguay, Peru, and Uruguay.

== Taxonomy and systematics ==
The black-goggled tanager was formally described in 1818 by the French ornithologist Louis Pierre Vieillot under the binomial name Muscicapa melanops. Vieillot based his description on the Lindo pardo copete amarillo that had been described by the Spanish naturalist Félix de Azara in 1802 based on a specimen collected in Paraguay. The black-goggled tanager is now the only species in the genus Trichothraupis that was introduced by the German ornithologist Jean Cabanis in 1851. The genus name Trichothraupis combines the Ancient Greek thrix meaning "hair" with the genus name Thraupis. The specific epithet combines the Ancient Greek melas meaning "black" with ōps meaning "face". Within the Thraupidae the black-goggled tanager is a member of the subfamily Tachyphoninae and is the sister species to the grey-headed tanager (Eucometis penicillata).

The black-goggled tanager's further taxonomy is unsettled. The IOC, AviList, and the Clements taxonomy recognize two subspecies, the nominate T. m. melanops (Vieillot, 1818) and T. m. griseonota (Cavarzere et al, 2024). What they call T. m. griseonota was long treated as a disjunct population of the black-goggled tanager without being recognized as a separate taxon. In 2024 a study proposed that it should be treated as a separate species, T. griseonota. The South American Classification Committee (SACC) unanimously rejected the split, instead accepting the population as a subspecies, and the IOC, AviList, and Clements agreed.

However, as of late 2025 BirdLife International's Handbook of the Birds of the World (HBW) did not recognize griseonota as separate in any way but contined to treat the black-goggled tanager as monotypic with two populations.

This article follows the two-subspecies model.

== Description ==
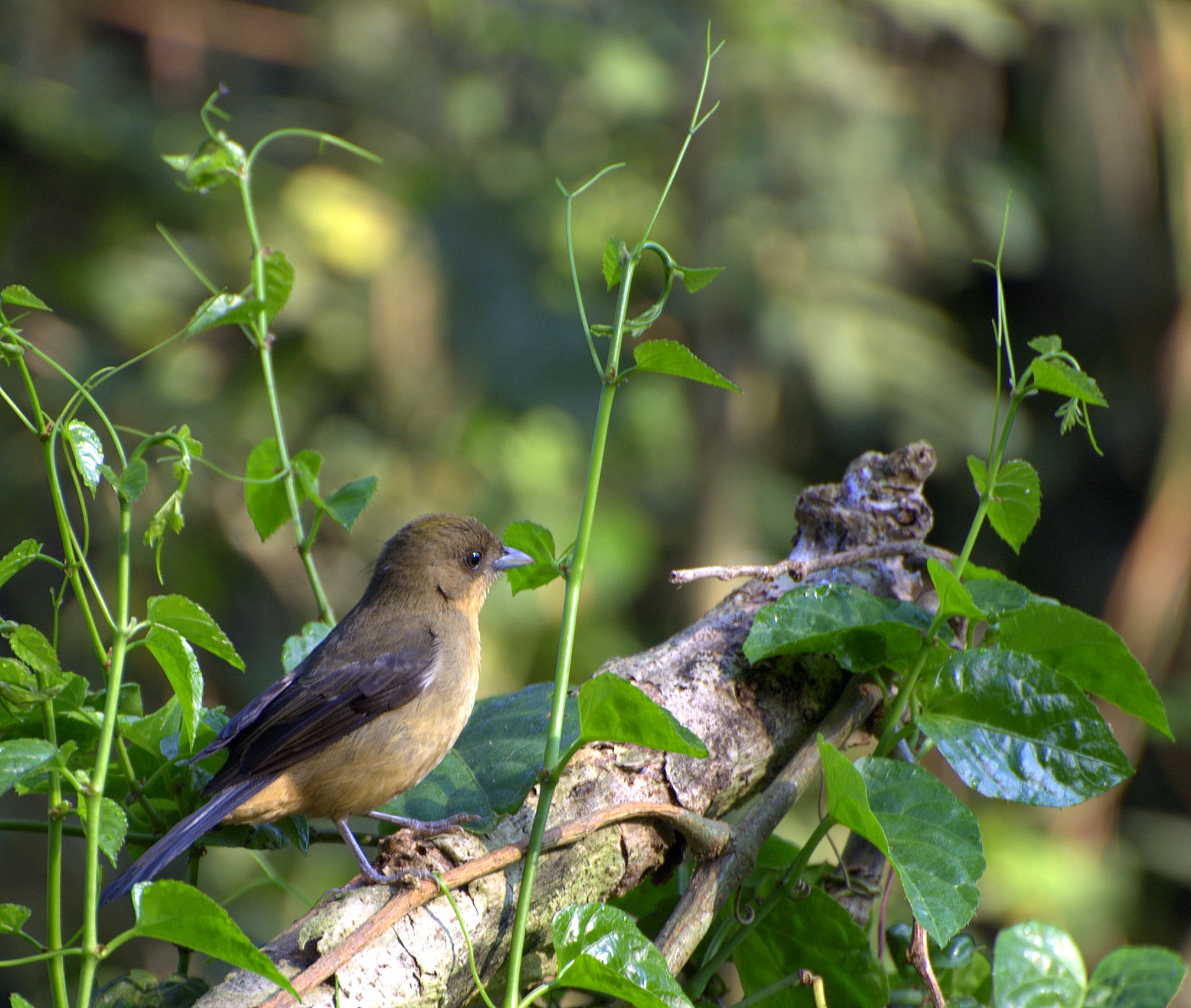
Female plumage

The black-goggled tanager is 15.7 to 16.8 cm (6.2 to 6.6 in) long and weighs 16.2 to 26.0 g (0.57 to 0.92 oz). The species is sexually dimorphic. Adult males of the nominate subspecies have a yellow crown that is usually hidden and a large black mask from the forehead to past the eye on an otherwise brownish-tinged olive-gray face. Their nape, back, rump, and uppertail coverts are also olive-gray with a brownish tinge. Their upperwing coverts are dusky. Their primary coverts are blackish and their flight feathers mostly blackish with white bands at the base of the secondaries and the center of the primaries. The white is seldom seen except in flight. Their tail is blackish. Their throat and underparts are mostly buff that is palest in the center of the belly. Their undertail coverts have a buffy cinnamon tinge and their underwing coverts are white. Adult females are overall duller than males. Their head is entirely brownish olive-gray with no yellow and at most a minimal amount of black. Their wings are not as dark as the male's. Compared to the nominate, males of subspecies T. m. griseonota have a larger black mask that extends onto most of the ear coverts, a grayer, less olive, back, a more buff-yellow breast, and creamier undertail coverts. Females have somewhat darker underparts than the nominate. Both sexes of both subspecies have a dark reddish brown iris, a blue-gray bill whose maxilla is sometimes duskier, and grayish horn legs.

== Distribution and habitat ==
The two subspecies of the black-goggled tanager have widely separated ranges. According to most sources the nominate is found in Brazil south from a line roughly from west-central Mato Grosso east to the Atlantic in east-central Bahia to central Rio Grande do Sul, and from there continues its range across eastern Paraguay and into northeastern Argentina. (Note: BirdLife International, the IOC, AviList, and Clements as cited in the Taxonomy section agree with this range.) However, the SACC includes Uruguay in the species' range. Subspecies T. m. griseonota is found along the eastern slope of the Andes from northwestern San Martín and southern Amazonas departments in northern Peru south through Bolivia and just into northern Jujuy Province in northwestern Argentina.

The two subspecies inhabit different landscapes. The nominate is found in somewhat open terrain such as shrublands, the edges of forest, gallery forest, and regrowing clearings. In Brazil it ranges in elevation from sea level to 1,200 m (3,900 ft). Subspecies T. m. griseonota inhabits the edges and gaps in of humid montane forest where it favors areas with dense undergrowth. In Peru it ranges in elevation between 900 and 1,800 m (3,000 and 5,900 ft) but is found down to 350 m (1,100 ft) in Bolivia.

== Behavior ==
=== Movement ===
The black-goggled tanager is believed to be a year-round resident.

=== Feeding ===
The black-goggled tanager feeds on insects and fruits. It usually forages in pairs or small family groups but sometimes in groups as large as 12 individuals. Especially in the Andes it regularly joins mixed-species feeding flocks. In Brazil it regularly attends army ant swarms and has been seen following monkey troops to capture prey disturbed by both. It hops restlessly through vegetation seeking food and sometimes takes it in mid-air or with a short sally to foliage.

=== Breeding ===
The black-goggled tanager's breeding season has not been defined, but in Brazil there is breeding evidence from September to November and in January. One nest was a cup in a patch of bamboo and contained three nestlings. Another had eggs that were pinkish white with darker markings. Nothing else is known about the species' breeding biology.

=== Vocalization ===
In Brazil the black-goggled tanager has two songs. One is "tseee wer-sit-je (1st part extr. high, 2nd part mid-high, each not emphasized)" and the other is a "very long series with buzzes, whistles, short ps notes; the same note often repeated several times". There its calls are an "extr. high, sharp, emphasized tcip or upslurred pseee". However, as of September 2026 xeno-canto had no recordings of black-goggled tanager vocalizations in Peru; the Cornell Lab of Ornithology's Macaulay Library had one of a song and three of calls. Both had a few recordings from Bolivia. The song of the Andean subspecies has not been described but sonograms of its calls resemble those of the nominate.

== Status ==
The IUCN has assessed the black-goggled tanager as being of Least Concern. It has a very large range; its population size is not known and is believed to be decreasing. No immediate threats have been identified. It is considered "common to frequent" in Brazil but "uncommon and local" in Peru with "few records north of Huánuco [Department]". "Extensive intact, unprotected habitat remains within this species’ range in Andes, but in parts of southeast Brazil deforestation is so complete that most of the unprotected habitat within the former range of this species has disappeared, and it is now confined largely to parks and reserves."
