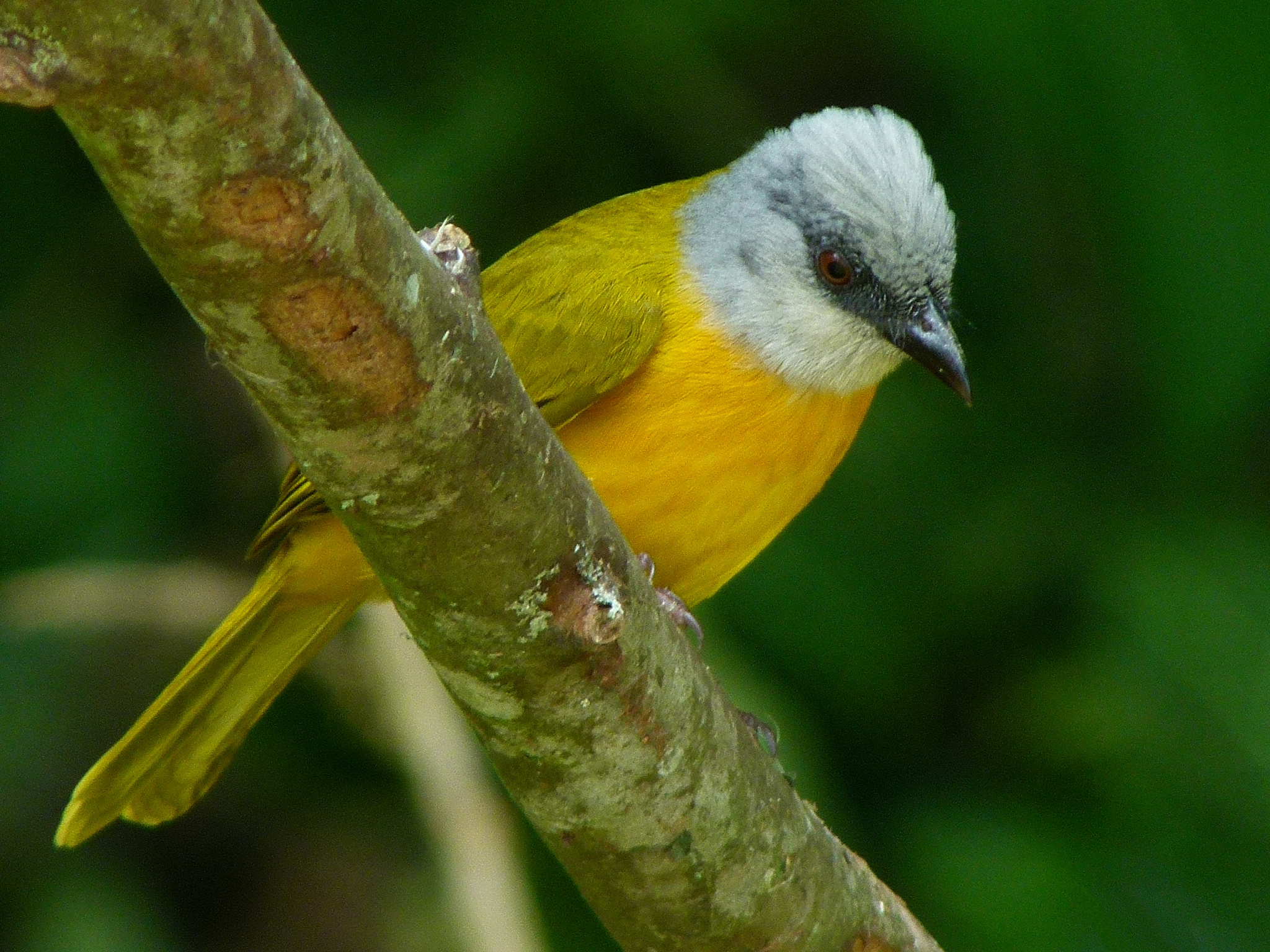
- At Manizales, Caldas, Colombia

Conservation status
- Least Concern (IUCN 3.1)

Scientific classification
- Kingdom: Animalia
- Phylum: Chordata
- Class: Aves
- Order: Passeriformes
- Family: Thraupidae
- Genus: Eucometis; Sclater, PL, 1856
- Species: E. penicillata

Binomial name
- Eucometis penicillata (Spix, 1825)

= Grey-headed tanager =

Species of bird

The grey-headed tanager (Eucometis penicillata) is a species of bird in the family Thraupidae, the tanagers and allies. It is found in Mexico, every Central American country except El Salvador, and every mainland South American country except Argentina, Chile, French Guiana, and Uruguay.

== Taxonomy and systematics ==
The grey-headed tanager was formally described in 1825 by the German naturalist Johann Baptist von Spix under the binomial name Tanagra penicillata. Spix did not specify a type locality but this was later designated as Fonte Boa in the Brazilian state of Amazonas. The grey-headed tanager is now the only species in the genus Eucometis that was introduced by the English zoologist Philip Sclater in 1856. The genus name is derived from Ancient Greek eukomēs meaning "with lovely hair". The specific epithet penicillata is from the Latin diminutive of peniculus meaning "brush".

Within the Thraupidae the grey-headed tanager is a member of the subfamily Tachyphoninae and is the sister species to the black-goggled tanager (Trichothraupis melanops).

The grey-headed tanager has these seven subspecies

- E. p. pallida Berlepsch, 1888
- E. p. spodocephalus (Bonaparte, 1853)
- E. p. stictothorax Berlepsch, 1888
- E. p. cristata (Du Bus de Gisignies, 1855)
- E. p. affinis Berlepsch, 1888
- E. p. penicillata (Spix, 1825)
- E. p. albicollis (d'Orbigny & Lafresnaye, 1837)

The American Ornithological Society and the Clements taxonomy group the first four as the "gray-headed tanager (gray crested)" and the other three as the "gray-headed tanager (gray-headed)".

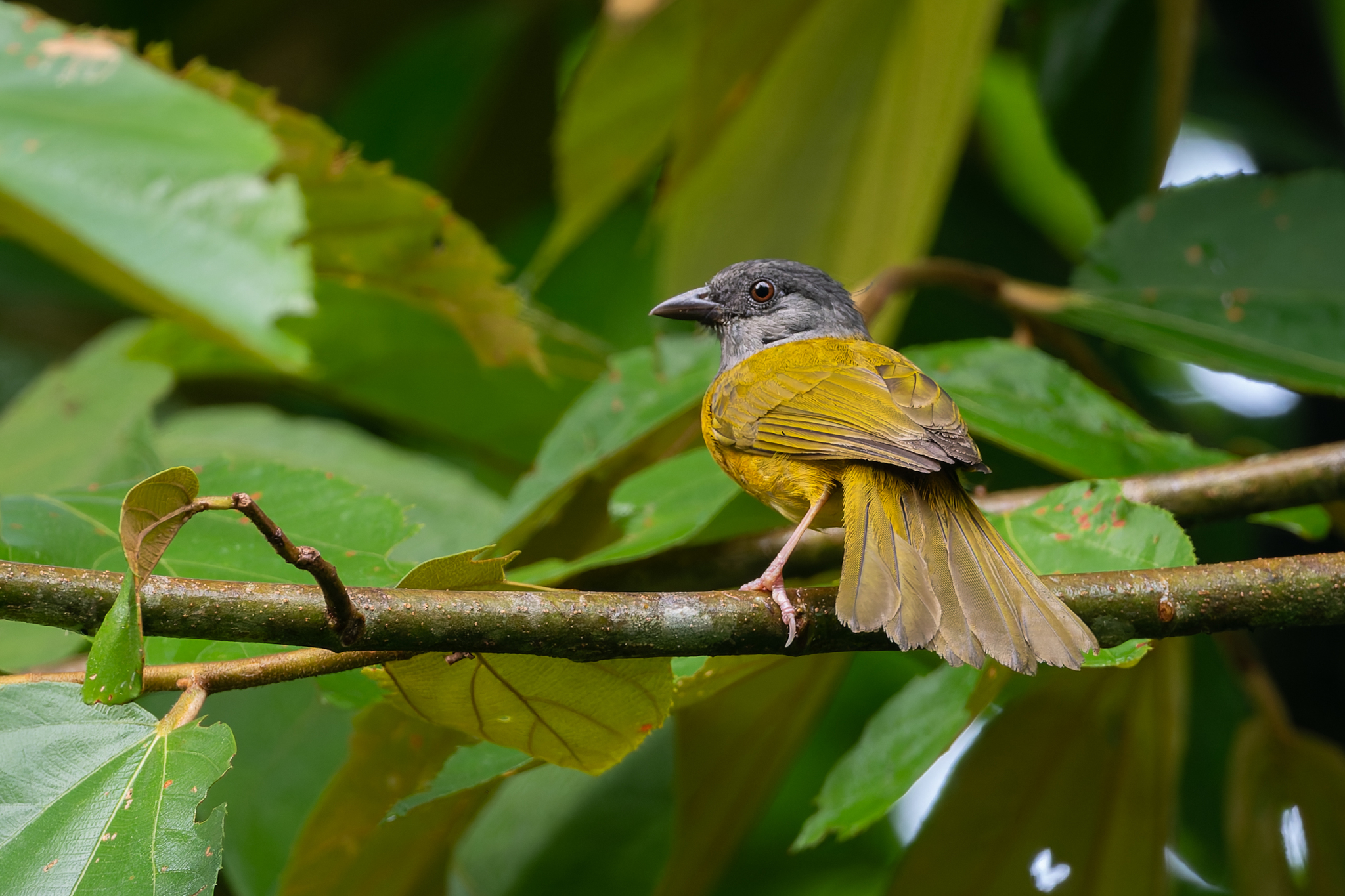
E. p. spodocephalus in Costa Rica

== Description ==
The grey-headed tanager is 16 to 17 cm (6.3 to 6.7 in) long and weighs 22.5 to 35.0 g (0.79 to 1.2 oz). It has a conical bill with a large rounded notch on the maxilla. The sexes have the same plumage. Adults of the nominate subspecies E. p. penicillata have the eponymous gray head with a crest of gray-tipped white feathers; the crest is usually raised only in agitation. Their upperparts are olive yellow. Their wings are yellowish olive with darker feather edges and their tail is pale brown with yellowish olive feather edges. Their throat is white and their underparts bright yellow with yellowish underwing coverts.

The other subspecies of the grey-headed tanager differ from the nominate and each other thus:

- E. p. pallida: darker gray head, pale gray throat, and richer yellow breast
- E. p. spodocephalus: deeper orangish yellow underparts
- E. p. stictothorax: greenish olive head with no crest and yellowish olive throat
- E. p. cristata: pale gray crest and olive-tinged throat
- E. p. affinis: shorter crest with less white and paler throat
- E. p. albicollis: very long crest; it, head, and throat are buffy gray

Both sexes of all subspecies have a bright reddish brown iris and pale brown legs.

== Distribution and habitat ==
The subspecies of the grey-headed tanager are found thus:

- E. p. pallida: Gulf-Caribbean slope from northern Oaxaca and southern Veracruz in southern Mexico south, including the Yucatán Peninsula, through northern and eastern Guatemala and much of Belize and intermittently across northern Honduras
- E. p. spodocephalus: Pacific and Caribbean slopes of Nicaragua south into Costa Rica to Guanacaste Province in the west and Alajuela Province in the east
- E. p. stictothorax: Pacific slope from Costa Rica's Puntarenas Province south into Panama to Veraguas Province
- E. p. cristata: Panama on Caribbean slope from Colón Province and Pacific slope from Veraguas east across northern Colombia (where south in Cauca River and Magdalena River valleys) and into northwestern Venezuela, where in the Serranía del Perijá, on the Andes' western base in Táchira and Mérida, and on the Andes' eastern base from Táchira to Portuguesa
- E. p. affinis: northern Venezuela in central and eastern Falcón and Coastal Range from Lara east to Miranda
- E. p. penicillata: extreme northwestern Amazonas in western Venezuela south on the east of the Andes through the southeastern half of Colombia and the northeastern quarter of Ecuador into northeastern Peru to far northern Cuzco Department; from Peru east across central Brazil to the Atlantic in Maranhão; separate from the contiguous range in the Guianas (but see below)
- E. p. albicollis: from extreme eastern Madre de Dios Department in southeastern Peru across approximately the northeastern third of Bolivia east into south-central Brazil within an area roughly bounded by far southern Rondônia, western Tocantins, south-central Minas Gerais, and southwestern Mato Grosso do Sul plus a record in northeastern Paraguay

Sources and the map place the species in all three of the Guianas but the South American Classification Committee has no records in French Guiana. The map also shows it in far northern Brazil adjoining Guyana but other sources do not include it or specifically exclude it there.

The grey-headed tanager overall inhabits "Tropical Lowland Evergreen Forest, Gallery Forest, River-edge Forest, [and] Secondary Forest" (capitals in original). In the Amazon Basin it favors várzea forest and woodland and other areas near water. In Central America it inhabits rainforest, mature secondary forest, and semi-deciduous forest. In drier regions in Venezuela it is also in gallery forest. Its overall elevation ceiling is given as 600 m (2,000 ft) and 1,700 m (5,600 ft) "but mostly below 600 m (2,000 ft)". In Mexico and Central America it ranges up to 1,250 m (4,100 ft) overall, to 750 m (2,500 ft) in northern Central America, and to 1,200 m (3,900 ft) in Costa Rica. It reaches 1,200 m (3,900 ft) in Venezuela, 1,800 m (5,900 ft) in Colombia, 400 m (1,300 ft) in Ecuador, and is mostly below 600 m (2,000 ft) in Brazil.

== Behavior ==
=== Movement ===
The grey-headed tanager is a year-round resident.

=== Feeding ===
The grey-headed tanager feeds primarily on a wide variety of insects and includes small amounts of fruits and seeds in it diet. It has two foraging strategies. In one it follows army ant swarms to capture insects fleeing the ants, staying within about 10 m (35 ft) of the ground. This strategy is followed primarily north of the Andes and seldom in Amazonia. In Costa Rica it has also been observed following squirrel monkeys (Saimiri oerstedi) and capuchin monkeys (Cebus capucinis) for the same reason. When away from ant swarms it typically perches about 5 to 15 m (15 to 50 ft) up and sallies to snatch prey from leaves. It also takes some prey by gleaning while perched and while briefly hovering.

=== Breeding ===
The grey-headed tanager's breeding season has not been fully established. It spans from March to September in Central America and breeding activity has been noted in Brazil's Pará in February, September, November, and December. Pairs build the nest, a small loose cup made from plant fibers. It is typically between about 0.5 and 3 m (2 and 10 ft) of the ground in a shrub or tree, usually in areas that have thick undergrowth. Clutches of one to three eggs are known but the usual number is two. The eggs have a pale blue-gray background that almost disappears under heavy blue and black markings. The female alone incubates, for about 14 to 16 days. Fledging occurs about 11 to 12 days after hatch and both parents provision and brood nestlings.

=== Vocalization ===
Only male grey-headed tanagers sing, and their song varies geographically. In northern Central America it is described as "a rapid series of chatters and squeaks, teep'tsee'u'cheu-teep'tsee'u'cheu-teep'tsee'u'cheu!". One song in Venezuela is "a high, buzzy pzzzt-buzzt-buzzt-fzzzt" and its calls there stet and chip. In Peru it is "a loud, strident series of jerky, ringing notes interspersed with high sibiliant sounds, seeps, and chips". There its calls are "a low tchup and a high, sibilant, descending series swee-swee-swee-swee". In Brazil its song is a "short, high, musical wic vri-oh-vri-oh or [a] longer series of nasal fuh-tjutju-weeh-te-tju-tetrit- notes". There its call is "soft, snappy bits notes".

== Status ==
The IUCN has assessed the grey-headed tanager as being of Least Concern. It has an extremely large range; its population size is not known but is believed to be stable. No immediate threats have been identified. It is considered "uncommon to fairly common" in northern Central America, "uncommon" in northwestern Costa Rica and "fairly common" further south, "common" in Colombia, "local" in Ecuador, "uncommon but widespread" in most of Peru but "rare" in the extreme southeast, "fairly common but local" in Venezuela, and "frequent to uncommon" in Brazil.
