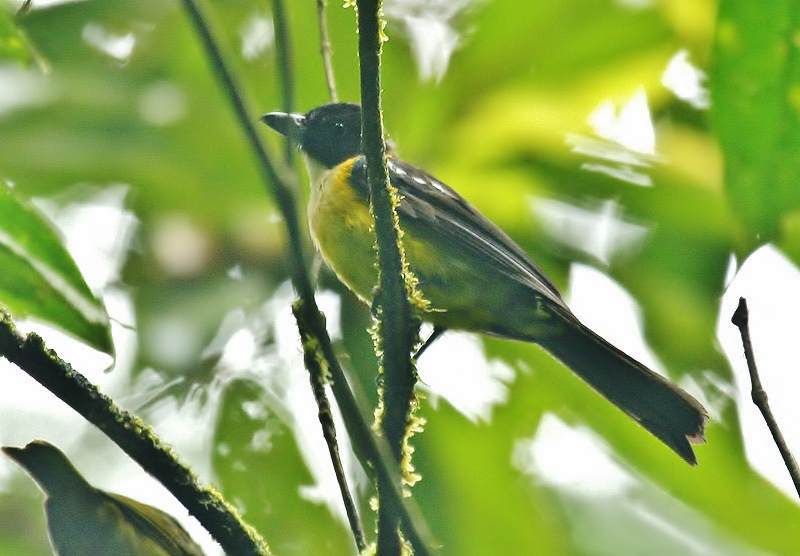
- White-throated shrike-tanager, Lanio leucothorax

Scientific classification
- Kingdom: Animalia
- Phylum: Chordata
- Class: Aves
- Order: Passeriformes
- Family: Thraupidae
- Genus: Lanio; Vieillot, 1816

Type species
- Tangara fulva Boddaert, 1783

Species
- Lanio aurantius Lanio fulvus Lanio leucothorax Lanio versicolor

= Lanio =

Genus of birds

Lanio is the genus of shrike-tanagers in the family Thraupidae.

The genus was introduced by the French ornithologist Louis Pierre Vieillot in 1816 with the fulvous shrike-tanager (Lanio fulvus) as the type species. The genus name is derived from the shrike genus Lanius that was introduced by the Swedish naturalist Carl Linnaeus in 1758 in the tenth edition of his Systema Naturae.

== Species list ==
The genus contains the following four species:

Genus Lanio – Vieillot, 1816 – four species
Common name	Scientific name and subspecies	Range	Size and ecology	IUCN status and estimated population
Fulvous shrike-tanager	Lanio fulvus (Boddaert, 1783)	Brazil, Colombia, Ecuador, French Guiana, Guyana, Peru, Suriname, and Venezuela	Size: Habitat: Diet:	LC
White-winged shrike-tanager	Lanio versicolor (D'Orbigny & Lafresnaye, 1837)	Bolivia, Brazil, and Peru	Size: Habitat: Diet:	LC
Black-throated shrike-tanager	Lanio aurantius Lafresnaye, 1846	Belize, Guatemala, Honduras, and Mexico.	Size: Habitat: Diet:	LC
White-throated shrike-tanager	Lanio leucothorax Salvin, 1865	Costa Rica, Honduras, Nicaragua, and Panama	Size: Habitat: Diet:	NT
