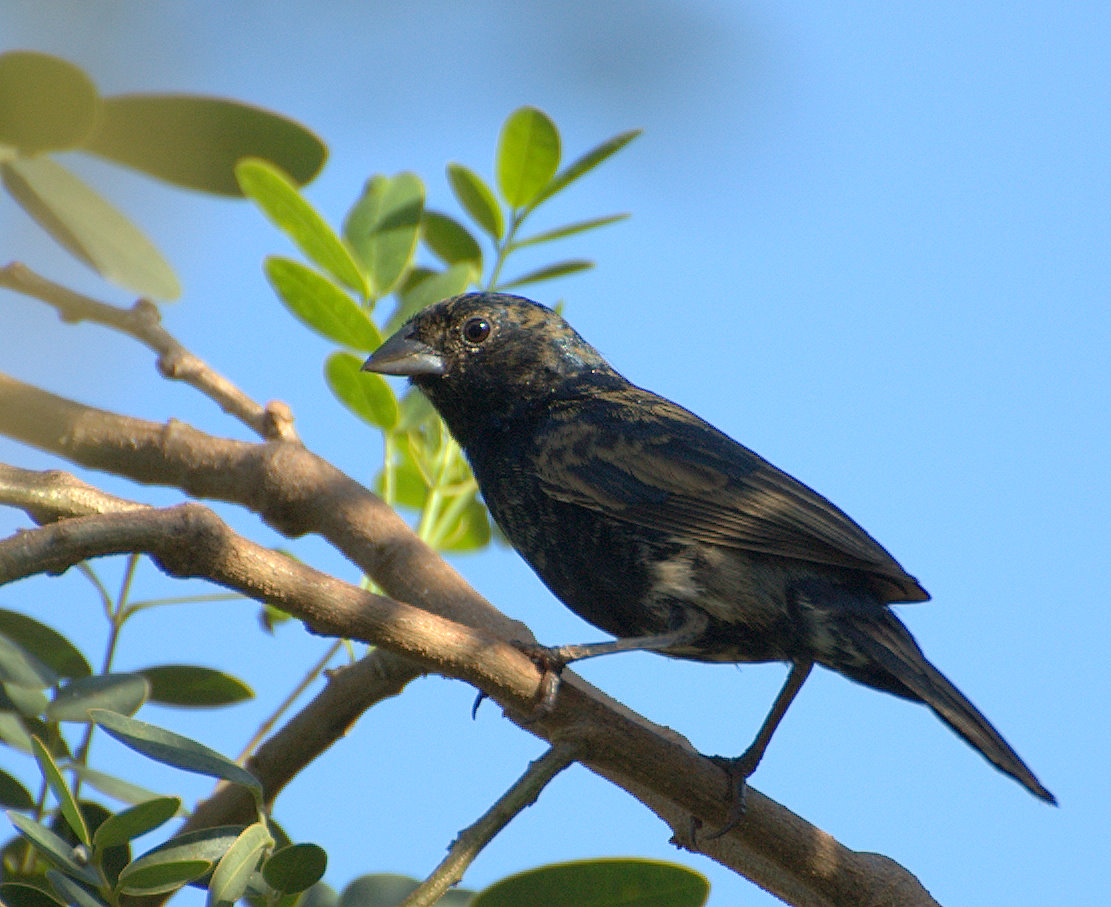
- Male at Manduri, São Paulo State, Brazil
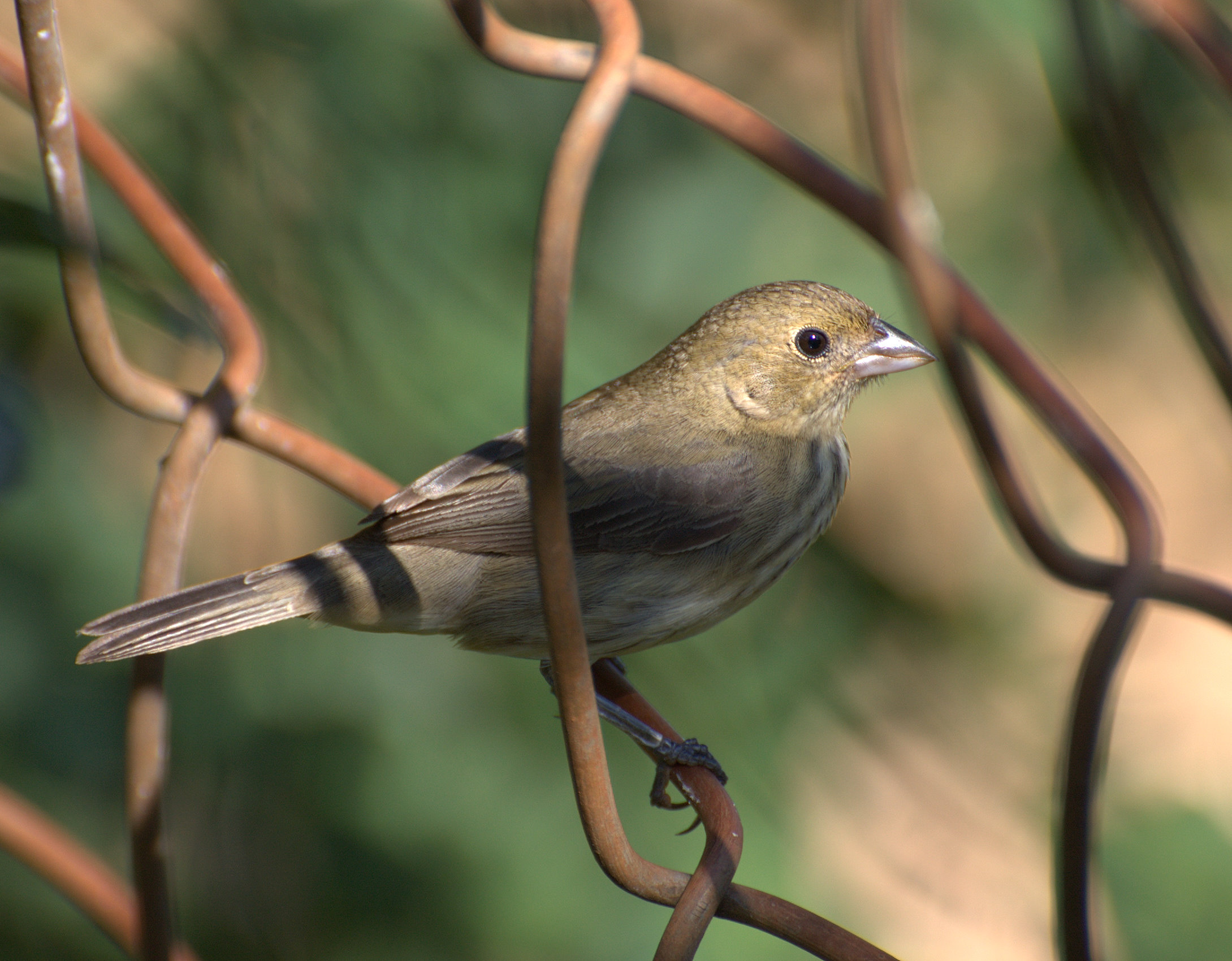
- Female at Manduri, São Paulo State, Brazil Recorded at Arthur Nogueira (São Paulo State, Brazil) by Eurico Zimbres

Conservation status
- Least Concern (IUCN 3.1)

Scientific classification
- Kingdom: Animalia
- Phylum: Chordata
- Class: Aves
- Order: Passeriformes
- Family: Thraupidae
- Genus: Volatinia; Reichenbach, 1850
- Species: V. jacarina

Binomial name
- Volatinia jacarina (Linnaeus, 1766)

Synonyms
- Tanagra jacarina Linnaeus, 1766

= Blue-black grassquit =

Species of bird

The blue-black grassquit (Volatinia jacarina) is a small Neotropical bird in the family Thraupidae, the tanagers and allies. It is found in Mexico, every Central American country, every mainland South American country, in Trinidad and Tobago, and in Grenada.

== Taxonomy and systematics ==
The blue-black grassquit was formally described by the Swedish naturalist Carl Linnaeus in 1766 in the twelfth edition of his Systema Naturae under the binomial name Tanagra jacarina. Linnaeus based his description on the "Jacarni" that was described in 1648 by the German naturalist Georg Marcgrave in his Historia Naturalis Brasiliae. The type locality is eastern Brazil. The specific epithet jacarina is derived from the Tupi language and was used for a type of finch. The blue-black grassquit is now the only species in the genus Volatinia that was introduced in 1850 by the German naturalist Ludwig Reichenbach. The genus name is a diminutive of the Latin volatus meaning "flying".

Within the tanager family Thraupidae the blue-black grassquit is in the subfamily Tachyphoninae and is a member of a clade that contains the genera Conothraupis and Creurgops. It was formerly placed with the buntings in the subfamily Emberizinae rather than with the tanagers in Thraupinae within an expanded family Emberizidae.

The blue-black grassquit has these three subspecies:

- V. j. splendens (Vieillot, 1817)
- V. j. jacarina (Linnaeus, 1766)
- V. j. peruviensis (Peale, 1849)

== Description ==
The blue-black grassquit is 8.7 to 10.9 cm (3.4 to 4.3 in) long and weighs 8 to 12 g (0.28 to 0.42 oz). It has a longish conical bill. The species is sexually dimorphic. Adult males of the nominate subspecies V. j. jacarina are mostly black with dark blue iridescence. Their flight feathers and tail are flat black. Their axillaries, underwing coverts, and the bases of the remiges' underside have a white patch that usually is visible only in flight. Adult females have a warm brown head and upperparts with faint darker streaks on the crown, mantle, and back. Their wings are brown with paler tips on some coverts that show as two faint wing bars and buffy edges on the tertials. Their tail is brown with buff tips on the outer feathers that quickly wear away. Their throat and underparts are warm buff with sometimes a cinnamon wash on the breast. Their breast has a band of darker streaks which continue along the flanks. Juveniles are similar to adult females but with darker wings and tail and more streaking on the underparts. Subspecies V. j. splendens has less white on the axillaries than the nominate. V. j. peruviensis has brownish flight feathers and more white on the axillaries than the nominate. Both sexes of all subspecies have a brown iris, a blackish maxilla, a pale gray to horn-colored mandible, and legs that can be any of several shades of gray.

== Distribution and habitat ==
Subspecies V. j. splendens of the blue-black grassquit has by far the largest range of the three. It is found in Mexico on the west from southern Sonora south and in the east from southern Tamaulipas; the two ranges merge across southern Mexico at the Isthmus of Tehuantepec and then separate again leaving a gap in central Chiapas. The range continues on the east to include the Yucatán Peninsula and south through eastern Guatemala and Belize and on the west through western Guatemala. It continues south through the whole of Honduras and El Salvador, all but far eastern Nicaragua, Costa Rica except for the Central Highlands, and all of Panama. Its range continues in South America through all of Colombia, south through eastern Ecuador and most of the length of eastern Peru, and east across northern and southern Venezuela (except the Andes and much of Bolívar) and across the Guianas and northern Amazonian Brazil. It also inhabits Trinidad, Tobago, and Grenada. It has also appeared as a vagrant in Arizona and on Bonaire.

Subspecies V. j. peruviensis is found on the western Andean slope through Ecuador and Peru into northwestern Chile. The nominate V. j. jacarina is found in Brazil south of a line from Mato Grosso to Maranhão south through the rest of the country and into southeastern Peru, eastern Bolivia, Paraguay, northern Uruguay, and northern Argentina south to Mendoza, Córdoba, and northern Buenos Aires provinces.

The blue-black grassquit's habitat is described as "Second-growth Scrub, Low Seasonally Wet Grassland, Arid Lowland Scrub, Pastures/Agricultural lands, Riparian Thickets" [capitals in original], mostly in the tropical zone and from sea level to 1,100 m (3,600 ft). A similar list is "[s]hrubby weedy fields and open thickets, field edges, grassy fields and roadsides". Individual field guides to the birds of many of the countries mirror these habitat types. However, sources differ on the species' maximum elevation. Birds of the World says it is 2,600 m (8,500 ft) and "perhaps even higher in El Salvador". It is stated as 1,800 m (5,900 ft) in northern Central America, which includes El Salvador. It is 1,700 m (5,600 ft) in Costa Rica, 2,200 m (7,200 ft) in Colombia, 2,000 m (6,600 ft) in Venezuela, mostly 1,000 m (3,300 ft) "but a few to 2,500 m (8,200 ft)" in Ecuador, 2,400 m (7,900 ft) in Peru, and 2,000 m (6,600 ft) in Brazil.

== Behavior ==
=== Movement ===
The blue-black grassquit is believed to be a sedentary year-round resident but some elevational movements are suspected.

=== Feeding ===
The blue-black grassquit feeds primarily on seeds; those of Paspalum and Panicum grasses are favored. It also eats small amounts of berries, insects, and Cecropia protein corpuscles. It forages mostly on the ground but also takes seeds directly from the grasses. It forages in pairs during the breeding season and outside it usually in flocks that often include other seed-eating birds.

=== Breeding ===
The blue-black grassquit's breeding season varies geographically but in general is within the span of April to October. It is socially monogamous, but extra-pair fertilizations, intraspecific parasitism, and quasi-parasitism are common. During the breeding season, males defend small territories, about 13.0–72.5 m^{2} (140–780 sq ft); dominant males are normally lighter. The male has a jumping display, often performed for long periods, which gives rise to the local name "johnny jump-up". This is accompanied by a persistent wheezing jweeee call, jumping several times in a minute. The extravagant display also has a cost of calling attention of the predator, thus displaying increased nest predation. Predation is the main cause of breeding failure, and predator vocalizations can cause an immune-related reaction to this species. Nests are small cups of rootlets (diameter about 7.5 cm) found in herbaceous vegetation 10–50 cm (4–20 in) high, clustered at a landscape, and placed preferably at high complex habitat spots. Nests are built by both sexes. The clutch is usually three eggs though clutches of two are known; the eggs are bluish white with darker spots. The incubation period is not known. Fledging occurs about nine days after hatch and both parents provision nestlings.

Display

=== Vocalization ===
One description of the blue-black grassquit's song is a "simple, 2-noted zeé-dji, repeated constantly". Another author says that breeding males "tirelessly give an explosive buzzy dzeee-u" during the display. A third writes the song as "a dry, sizzling tsi-SZZZEW".

== Status ==
The IUCN has assessed the blue-black grassquit as being of Least Concern. It has an extremely large range; its estimated population of at least 50 million mature individuals is believed to be increasing. No immediate threats have been identified. It is considered common in northern Central America, Costa Rica, Colombia, Ecuador, and very common in Venezuela. It is "particularly common" in coastal Peru and its Marañón River valley and "less common" in Amazonia. In Brazil it is "frequent to uncommon" in the central and western Amazon Basin and in the far north near the Guianas and "common to frequent" in the rest of the country.
