= Central Highlands, Australia =

Central Highlands, Australia may refer to:

- Central Highlands (Victoria)
- Central Highlands (Tasmania)

See also:

- Central Highlands (disambiguation)
