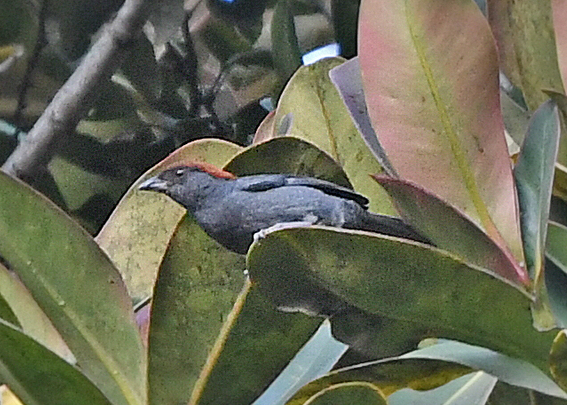

Conservation status
- Least Concern (IUCN 3.1)

Scientific classification
- Kingdom: Animalia
- Phylum: Chordata
- Class: Aves
- Order: Passeriformes
- Family: Thraupidae
- Genus: Creurgops
- Species: C. dentatus

Binomial name
- Creurgops dentatus (Sclater & Salvin, 1876)

= Slaty tanager =

Species of bird

The slaty tanager (Creurgops dentatus) is a species of bird in the family Thraupidae, the tanagers and allies. It is found in Bolivia and Peru.

== Taxonomy and systematics ==
The slaty tanager was formally described by Philip Sclater and Osbert Salvin in 1876 with the binomial Malacothraupis dentata; they erected the genus Malacothraupis for the species.

The slaty tanager now shares the genus Creurgops with the rufous-crested tanager (C. verticalis) and they form a superspecies. It is monotypic.

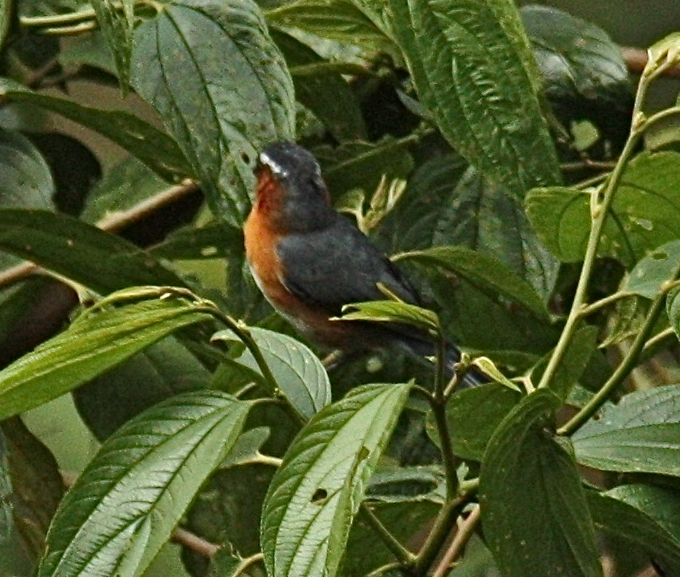
A female in a cloud forest above Cock-of-the-Rock Lodge, Peru

== Description ==
The slaty tanager is 14 to 15 cm (5.5 to 5.9 in) long and weighs 16 to 20 g (0.56 to 0.71 oz). It has a heavy beak. The species is sexually dimorphic. Adult males have a chestnut cap that encompasses the upper half of its head and its nape; it has a thin black line below it. Their rest of their head and their body, wings, and tail are slate-gray. Adult females have a dark gray crown, a thin white supercilium, dark gray lores whose color extends past the eye, and bright rufous ear coverts. Their nape, upperparts, wings, and tail are slate-gray. Their chin and upper throat are white, their breast, sides, and flanks are bright rufous, and the center of their lower breast, their belly, and their undertail coverts are white. Both sexes have a reddish brown iris, a blackish bill, and grayish horn legs.

== Distribution and habitat ==
The slaty tanager is found along the eastern slope of the Andes from eastern Junín Department in central Peru south into Bolivia at least as far as Cochabamba Department. It primarily inhabits the interior of humid, wet, mossy cloudforest and mature secondary forest. In elevation it ranges between 1,200 and 2,500 m (3,900 and 8,200 ft).

== Behavior ==
=== Movement ===
As far as is known, the slaty tanager is a year-round resident, though some seasonal movements are suspected.

=== Feeding ===
The slaty tanager feeds primarily on arthropods with minor amounts of fruits in its diet. It usually forages singly or in pairs as part of a mixed-species feeding flock, and usually in the forest canopy or subcanopy. It is rather active, hopping along tree limbs to leafy areas where it takes prey from foliage.

=== Breeding ===
Nothing is known about the slaty tanager's breeding biology.

=== Vocalization ===
As of September 2026 xeno-canto had five recordings of slaty tanager calls; the Cornell Lab of Ornithology's Macaulay Library had one of them and two others. Neither had a recording of its song. However, its song is described as "a high, wheedling series of notes"; its call is "a thin tchip".

== Status ==
The IUCN has assessed the slaty tanager as being of Least Concern. It has a large range; its population size is not known and is believed to be decreasing. No immediate threats have been identified. It is considered uncommon in Peru but its "status in Bolivia [is] less clear". It does occur in several large protected areas. "The species’ range includes considerable intact forest which is unprotected, but appears not to be at any risk in the short term."
