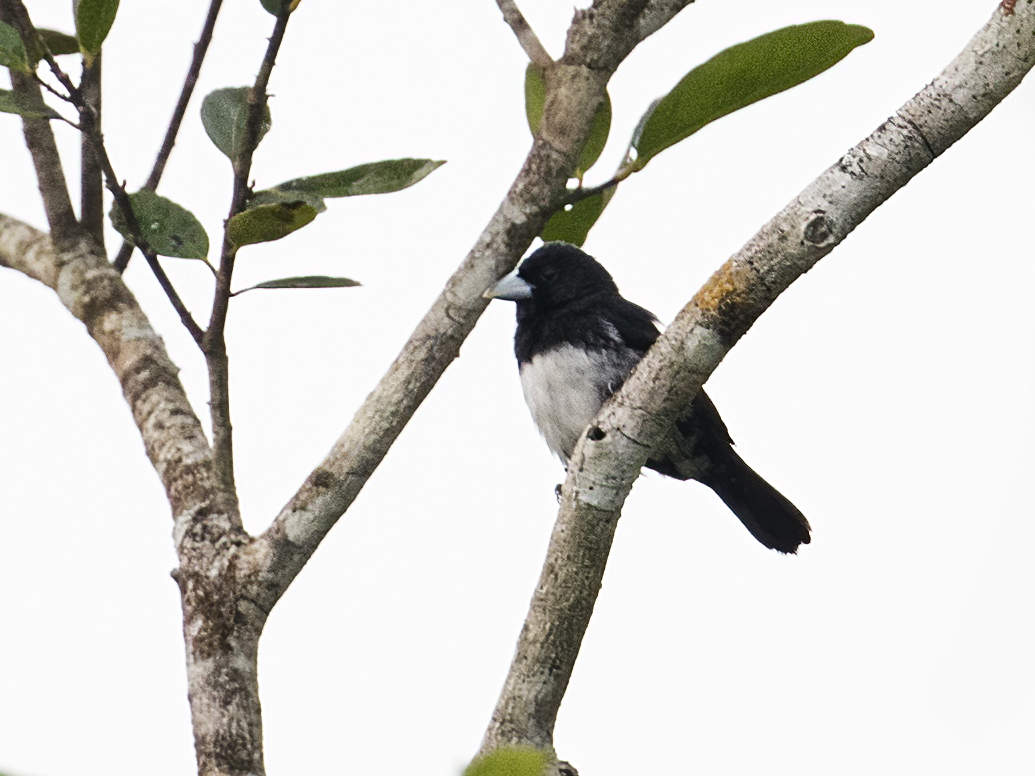

Conservation status
- Endangered (IUCN 3.1)

Scientific classification
- Kingdom: Animalia
- Phylum: Chordata
- Class: Aves
- Order: Passeriformes
- Family: Thraupidae
- Genus: Conothraupis
- Species: C. mesoleuca

Binomial name
- Conothraupis mesoleuca (Berlioz, 1939)

= Cone-billed tanager =

Species of bird

The cone-billed tanager (Conothraupis mesoleuca) is an Endangered species of bird is a bird in the family Thraupidae, the tanagers and allies. It is endemic to Brazil.

== Taxonomy and systematics ==
The cone-billed tanager was formally described by Jacques Berlioz in 1939 with the binomial Rhynchothraupis mesoleuca. The genus was erected just for it. In 1951 James Bond reassigned to its present genus Conothraupis to join the black-and-white tanager (C. speculigera). He did this with Berlioz' agreement; Berlioz had raised the possibility that the two were closely related.

The cone-billed tanager is monotypic.

== History ==
The cone-billed tanager was described on the basis of a single male specimen collected in Mato Grosso, Brazil, in 1938. After "more than half a century in total obscurity", the species was rediscovered in 2003 in gallery woodland in Emas National Park, Goiás, and additional sightings have followed there. A second population was discovered in 2006 about 900 km (560 mi) to the northwest in Mato Grosso.

== Description ==
The cone-billed tanager is about 12 to 14 cm (4.7 to 5.5 in) long; one male weighed 15 g (0.53 oz) and one female 15.5 g (0.55 oz). The species is sexually dimorphic. Adult males are mostly black with a greenish gloss. They have a small white patch at the base of their primaries and the center of their breast to their undertail coverts is also white. They have a dark brown iris, a thick pale blue-gray to whitish bill, and grayish brown to black legs. Adult females are mostly gray-brown. Their breast is pale olive-brown and the center of their lower breast and their belly are buffy white. They have a pale dull olive bill and dark brown legs. The species is smaller than the similar black-and-white tanager, whose males have gray sides and flanks.

== Distribution and habitat ==
As of 2017, the cone-billed tanager was known from Goiás in Emas National Park, several municipalities in the basin of the upper Juruena River in Mato Grosso, at Itiquira in southeastern Mato Grosso, and at Serra do Cachimbo in southern Pará. The Juruena River area appears to hold the majority of the species' total population. Its habitat differs somewhat between the two main populations, though they both are found in river-related landscapes. In Mato Grosso it is found in seasonally flooded forest and grasslands below about 120 m (400 ft) above sea level. In Goiás it inhabits them and also semi-deciduous and gallery forests up to about 300 m (1,000 ft).

== Behavior ==
=== Movement ===
The cone-billed tanager is non-migratory.

=== Feeding ===
The cone-billed tanager feeds on insects and also seeds such as those of grasses and bamboo. It has been observed hawking for insects.

=== Breeding ===
The cone-billed tanager is apparently monogamous and territorial but nothing else is known about its breeding biology.

=== Vocalization ===
The male cone-billed tanager's song "consists of several musical notes, followed by 2 slightly lower-pitched notes extended into trills, and finally a very high-pitched trill, e.g. tche, tche, tche, tche, tche, tcherrrrrrrrrrrr, tcherrrrrrrrr, tiiiiiiiiiiiiiiiiiiiiiiiiii". It also has a "loud song on descending scale and ending with short metallic tzi (Mato Grosso), or faster and ending with even shorter ascending note (Goiás). "Both sexes give loud chank call."

== Status ==
The IUCN originally in 1988 assessed the cone-billed tanager as Threatened, then in 1994 as Vulnerable, in 2000 as Critically Endangered, and since 2017 as Endangered. It is known from three separate areas; its estimated population of between 250 and 999 mature individuals is believed to be decreasing. "This species is likely to have suffered from forest clearance and degradation through agricultural expansion and mechanisation in the region. The spread of soya cultivation in particular poses a serious threat outside Emas National Park...An impending hydroelectric project planned for Bacia do Alto Juruena and involving the construction of five hydroelectric plants will flood the Juruena river area, which appears to be the global stronghold for the species, and could extinguish more than half of the total population in a short time."
