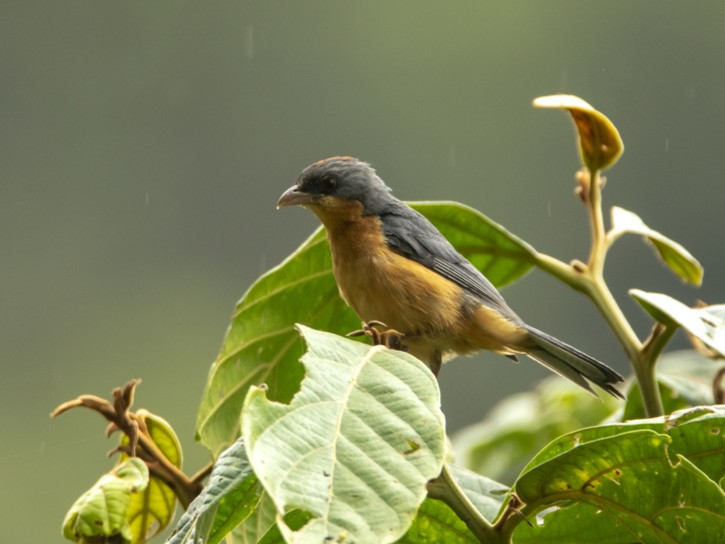

Conservation status
- Least Concern (IUCN 3.1)

Scientific classification
- Kingdom: Animalia
- Phylum: Chordata
- Class: Aves
- Order: Passeriformes
- Family: Thraupidae
- Genus: Creurgops
- Species: C. verticalis

Binomial name
- Creurgops verticalis Sclater, PL, 1858

= Rufous-crested tanager =

Species of bird

The rufous-crested tanager (Creurgops verticalis) is a species of bird in the family Thraupidae, the tanagers and allies. It is found in Colombia, Ecuador, Peru and Venezuela.

== Taxonomy and systematics ==
The rufous-crested tanager was formally described in 1858 by the English zoologist Philip Sclater based on a specimen collected from the Napo River in eastern Ecuador. Sclater erected the genus Creurgops and described Creurgops verticalis as its only member at the time.

The rufous-crested tanager now shares the genus with the slaty tanager (C. dentatus) and they form a superspecies. It is monotypic.

== Description ==
The rufous-crested tanager is about 15 cm (5.9 in) long and weighs 21 to 27 g (0.74 to 0.95 oz). It has a heavy beak with a "tooth" at the tip of its maxilla, although this feature is usually only visible when held. The species is sexually dimorphic though not dramatically so. Adult males have a mostly leaden gray head with the eponymous cinnamon-rufous crest; the crest has a thin black border and is seldom raised. Their nape, upperparts, uppertail coverts, wing coverts, and tail are leaden gray. Their flight feathers are dusky with leaden gray edges and their tertials leaden with dusky inner webs. Their chin, throat, and underparts are cinnamon-rufous. Adult females resemble males but their head has no rufous crest and their underparts are slightly paler. Both sexes have a dark red to reddish brown iris, a blackish bill, and brownish gray legs.

== Distribution and habitat ==
The rufous-crested tanager is a bird of the Andes, where it has a disjunct distribution. One population is in southwestern Venezuela's southern Táchira state. A second is found along Colombia's Eastern Andes and south on the eastern Andean slope through Ecuador just into extreme northern Peru's Piura and Cajamarca departments. A third is intermittently found in Colombia's Central and Western Andes and very slightly into extreme northern Ecuador's Carchi Province. Its southernmost range is along the eastern slope of the Andes of Peru between central Amazonas and northern Ayacucho departments.

The rufous-crested tanager primarily inhabits the interior of humid, wet, mossy cloudforest though it sometimes is found at its edges. In Venezuela it is found at about 1,800 m (5,900 ft) of elevation. It is found between 1,400 and 2,800 m (4,600 and 9,200 ft) in Colombia, mostly between 1,500 and 2,500 m (4,900 and 8,200 ft) in Ecuador, and between 1,100 and 2,400 m (3,600 and 7,900 ft) in Peru.

== Behavior ==
=== Movement ===
As far as is known the rufous-crested tanager is a year-round resident.

=== Feeding ===
The rufous-crested tanager feed primarily on insects and includes some fruit in its diet. It usually forages in pairs as part of a mixed-species feeding flock. It is rather active, hopping along tree limbs to leafy areas where it probes and pecks prey from foliage, sometimes hanging upside down. It occasionally hawks insects.

=== Breeding ===
The rufous-crested tanager's breeding season has not been defined but in Colombia males were found in breeding condition in March and June and juveniles were seen in August and December. Nothing else is known about the species' breeding biology.

=== Vocalization ===
The rufous-crested tanager is not very vocal. What is thought to be its song is "a rather high series of short phrases, t-sa, pit-sa...sa-pít, sa-pít, sa-pít...sa-pít...pit-za without much clear pattern". Its calls include "lower-pitched chup notes and various undistinctive sit and seet notes".

== Status ==
The IUCN has assessed the rufous-crested tanager as being of Least Concern. It has a large range; its population size is not known and is believed to be decreasing. No immediate threats have been identified. In Venezuela it is know from only a small number of records. It is "very local" in Colombia, "found locally" in Ecuador, and "uncommon" in Peru. "Deforestation within this species’ range is widespread, especially in Colombia and Ecuador, but it occurs in numerous protected areas...Despite fragmentation of its range through deforestation, it should survive also in intact habitat in many unprotected areas."
