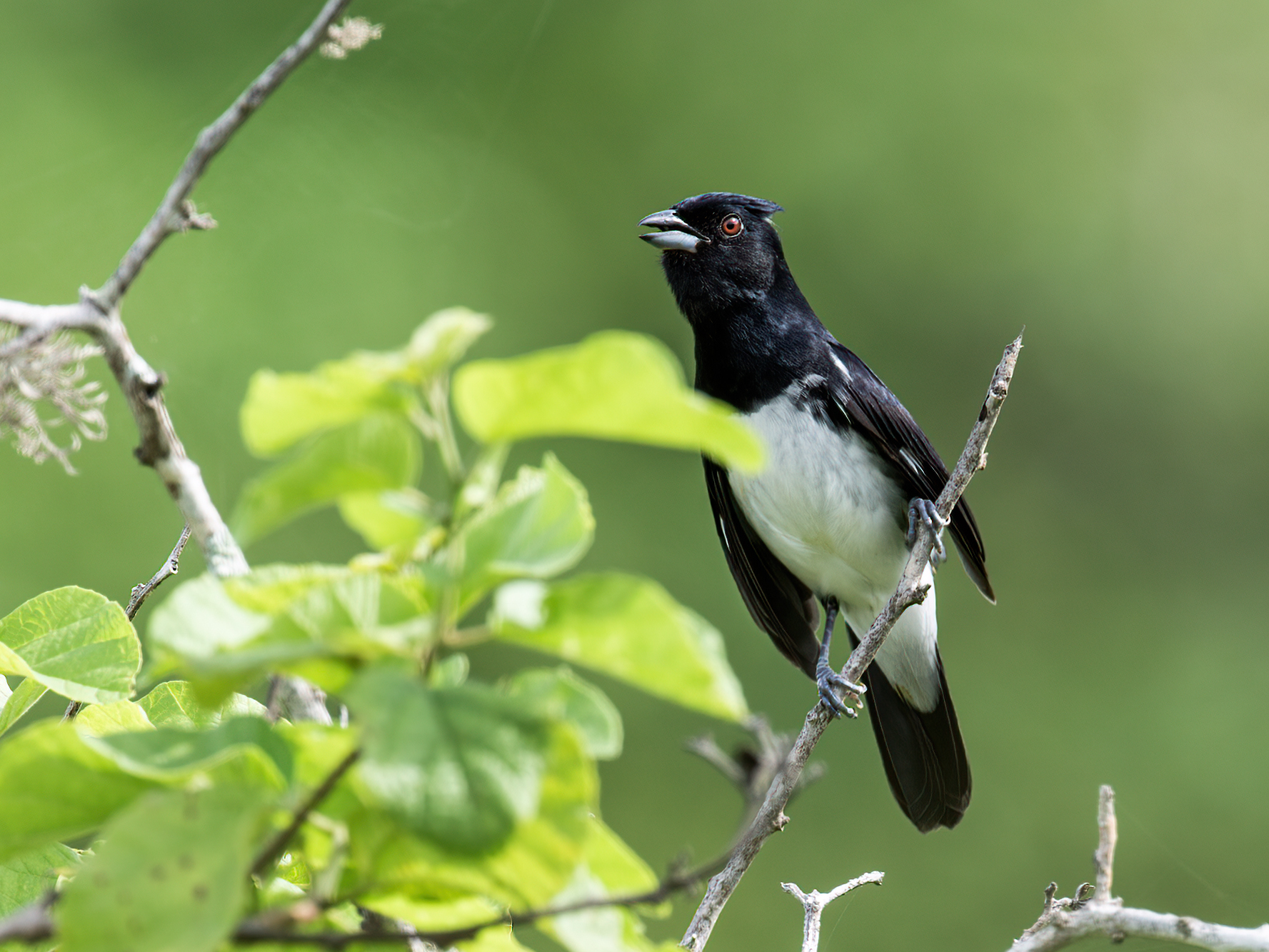

Conservation status
- Least Concern (IUCN 3.1)

Scientific classification
- Kingdom: Animalia
- Phylum: Chordata
- Class: Aves
- Order: Passeriformes
- Family: Thraupidae
- Genus: Conothraupis
- Species: C. speculigera

Binomial name
- Conothraupis speculigera (Gould, 1855)

= Black-and-white tanager =

Species of bird

The black-and-white tanager (Conothraupis speculigera) is a bird in the family Thraupidae, the tanagers and allies. It is found primarily in Ecuador and Peru but in migration and as a vagrant has appeared in several other countries.

== Taxonomy and systematics ==
The black-and-white tanager was formally described in 1855 with the binomial Schistochlamys speculigera. In 1880 Philip Sclater erected its present genus Conothraupis with speculigera as the type species. It now shares the genus with the cone-billed tanager (C. mesoleuca).

The black-and-white tanager is monotypic.

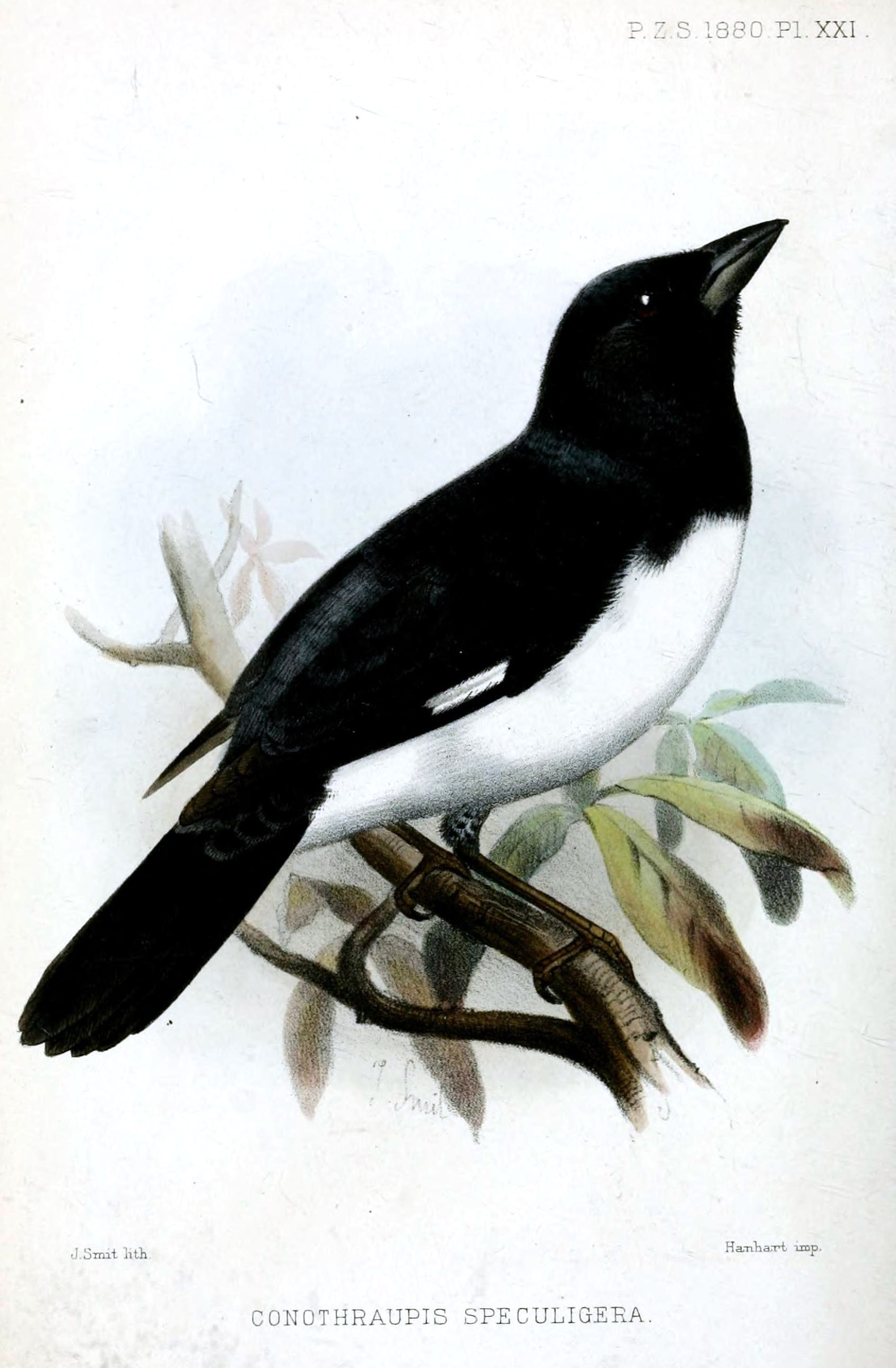
Illustration of black-and-white tanager by Joseph Smit, 1880

== Description ==
The black-and-white tanager is 16 to 16.5 cm (6.3 to 6.5 in) long and weighs 23 to 28 g (0.81 to 0.99 oz). The species is sexually dimorphic. Adult males have a black head, throat, neck, upper breast, and back. Their lower back, rump, uppertail coverts, and tail are gray. Their upperwing coverts and flight feathers are glossy black with white on the outer webs of the latter near their base. Their lower breast and belly are white, their sides and flanks gray, and their underwing coverts white. Adult females have an olive head with a faint broken eye-ring and olive upperparts. Their wings are mostly olive with blackish primary coverts. Their tail is dusky with olive feather edges. Their throat is white with an olive-yellow tinge, their upper breast white with a heavy olive wash and blurry olive streaks, and their lower breast and belly buff-white or white with a yellowish tinge. Both sexes have a red-brown iris, a thickish bluish gray bill with a black tip, and dark gray legs. Juveniles resemble adult females.

== Distribution and habitat ==
The black-and-white tanager breeds from Loja Province in southwestern Ecuador south into northwestern Peru as far as La Libertad Department. There are also scattered records further north in Ecuador. In the non-breeding season it is found mostly the length of Amazonian Peru from near Ecuador south to Madre de Dios Department and slightly into far western Brazil's Acre state. There are also scattered records in Brazil almost to the Atlantic. The species has also appeared as a vagrant in Colombia and French Guiana and there is an unconfirmed record in Bolivia.

The black-and-white tanager breeds in dry woodlands, forest, and scrublands; it apparently seeks areas of local rain. In Amazonia it inhabits the edges of forest along open areas and rivers and also secondary forest. In Ecuador it ranges in elevation mostly between 500 and 1,700 m (1,600 and 5,600 ft). It breeds in Peru up to 1,500 m (4,900 ft) but is found only below 700 m (2,300 ft) in Amazonia. In its small Brazilian range it occurs up to 1,400 m (4,600 ft).

== Behavior ==
=== Movement ===
The black-and-white tanager is a complete migrant, and within its breeding range also appears to be nomadic. As described above, it leaves its small breeding range after the season and winters in the far western Amazon Basin. It is in Ecuador until May but its typical arrival time in fall is not certain. It is present in northwestern Peru mostly between February and May "but may linger much later during wetter years". It known in Amazonia between June and September and is believed to be there longer.

=== Feeding ===
The black-and-white tanager feeds mostly on insects and spiders and includes smaller amounts of seeds in its diet. It forages singly, in pairs, and in small groups that however occasionally reach more than 50 birds. It forages mostly in the upper parts of trees.

=== Breeding ===
The black-and-white tanager apparently breeds mostly between February and May. The species' first described nest was discovered in Ecuador in March 2006. It was an "untidy, loosely woven cup" made from sticks and leaf petioles and lined with fungal rhizomorphs. It was 6.5 cm (2.6 in) high and 10.5 cm (4.1 in) wide, with a cup 6 cm (2.4 in) wide and 4 cm (1.6 in) deep. It was about 0.6 m (2 ft) above the ground in a small Lantana shrub and held two eggs. One nest found in March 2004 was 1.4 m (5 ft) above the ground in a shrub of family Urticaceae and held three eggs. No further data were collected from either nest.

=== Vocalization ===
The black-and-white tanager's song is "a loud, repetitive, liquid phrase: chi-DONG chi-DONG chi-DONG" and its call "a high, descending tee".

== Status ==
The IUCN originally in 1988 assessed the black-and-white tanager as being of Least Concern, then in 1994 as Near Threatened, and since 2021 again as of Least Concern. Its population size is not known but is believed to be stable. "It is generally threatened by deforestation and understorey degradation, which is considered to be isolating populations within its already disjunct range." It is considered a "locally fairly common breeder" in Ecuador and a "rare to uncommon" breeder in Peru. There are only a few records in Brazil.
