= Central Highlands =

Central Highlands may refer to:

- Central Highlands (Central America)
- Central Highlands of Florida
- Massif Central of France
- Highlands of Iceland
- New Guinea Highlands of Indonesia
- Central Highland (Japan)
- Central Highlands (Madagascar)
- Cameron Highlands of Malaysia
- Central Highlands of Scotland, also known as the Grampians
- Central Highlands of Sri Lanka
- Central Highlands (Vietnam)

== Australia ==
- Central Highlands Region, Queensland, local government area
- Central Highlands (Tasmania), Australia
  - Central Highlands Council, local government area
- Central Highlands (Victoria), Australia
  - Central Highlands Province, state electorate
