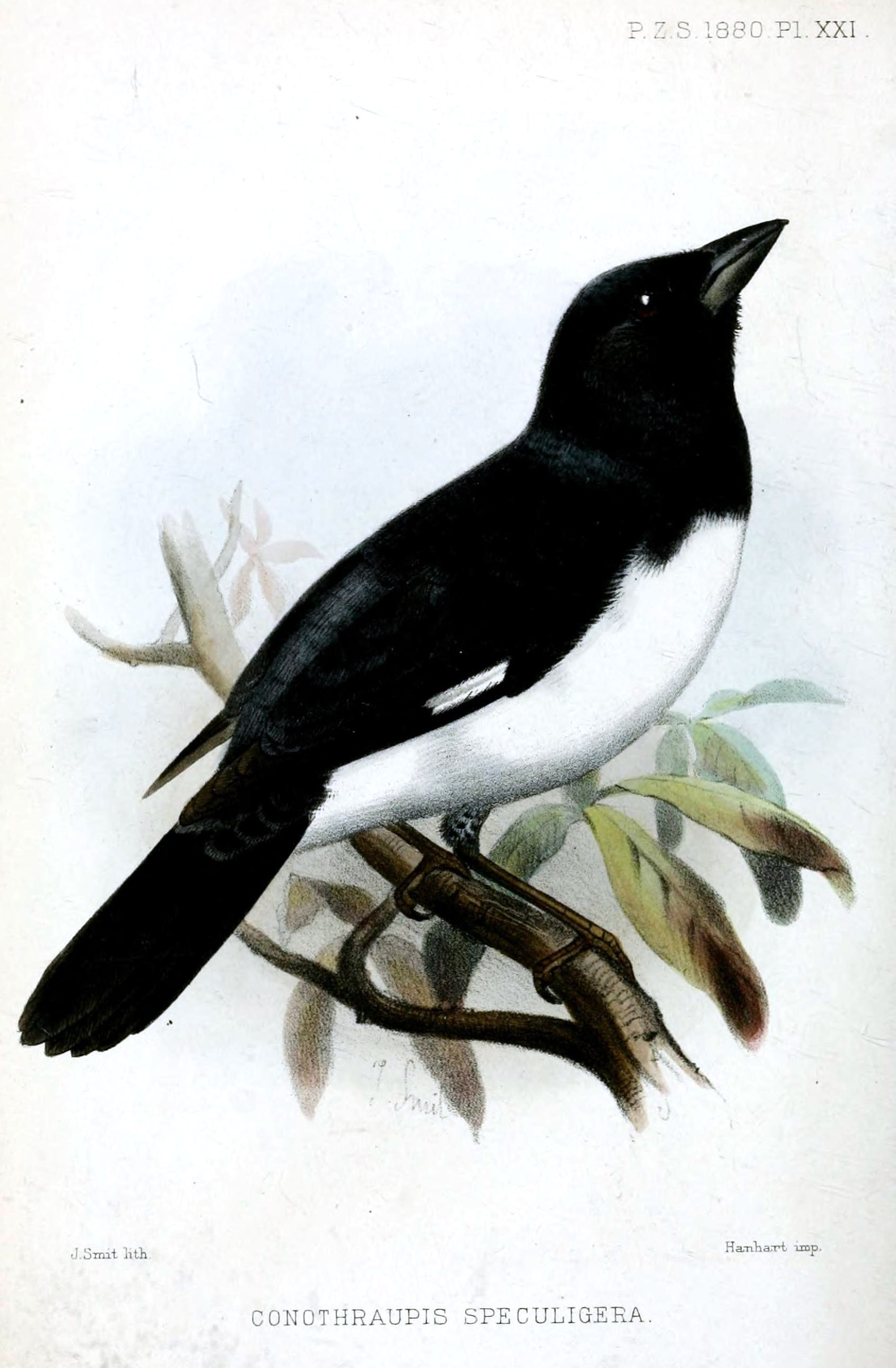
- Conothraupis speculigera

Scientific classification
- Kingdom: Animalia
- Phylum: Chordata
- Class: Aves
- Order: Passeriformes
- Family: Thraupidae
- Genus: Conothraupis; Sclater, PL, 1880

Type species
- Schistochlamys speculigera Gould, 1855

Species
- Conothraupis speculigera; Conothraupis mesoleuca

= Conothraupis =

Genus of birds

Conothraupis is a genus of South American birds in the tanager family Thraupidae.

== Taxonomy and species list ==
The genus Conothraupis was introduced in 1880 by the English zoologist Philip Sclater to accommodate the black-and-white tanager. The name combines the Latin conos meaning "cone" with the Ancient Greek θραυπίς (thraupís), an unknown small bird which in ornithology is used to indicate a tanager. The genus is a member of the subfamily Tachyphoninae within the family Thraupidae and contains the following two species.

Image	Scientific name	Common name	Distribution
	Conothraupis speculigera	Black-and-white tanager	southwestern Ecuador and northwestern Peru
	Conothraupis mesoleuca	Cone-billed tanager	Brazil.
