= Manduri =

- Municipality
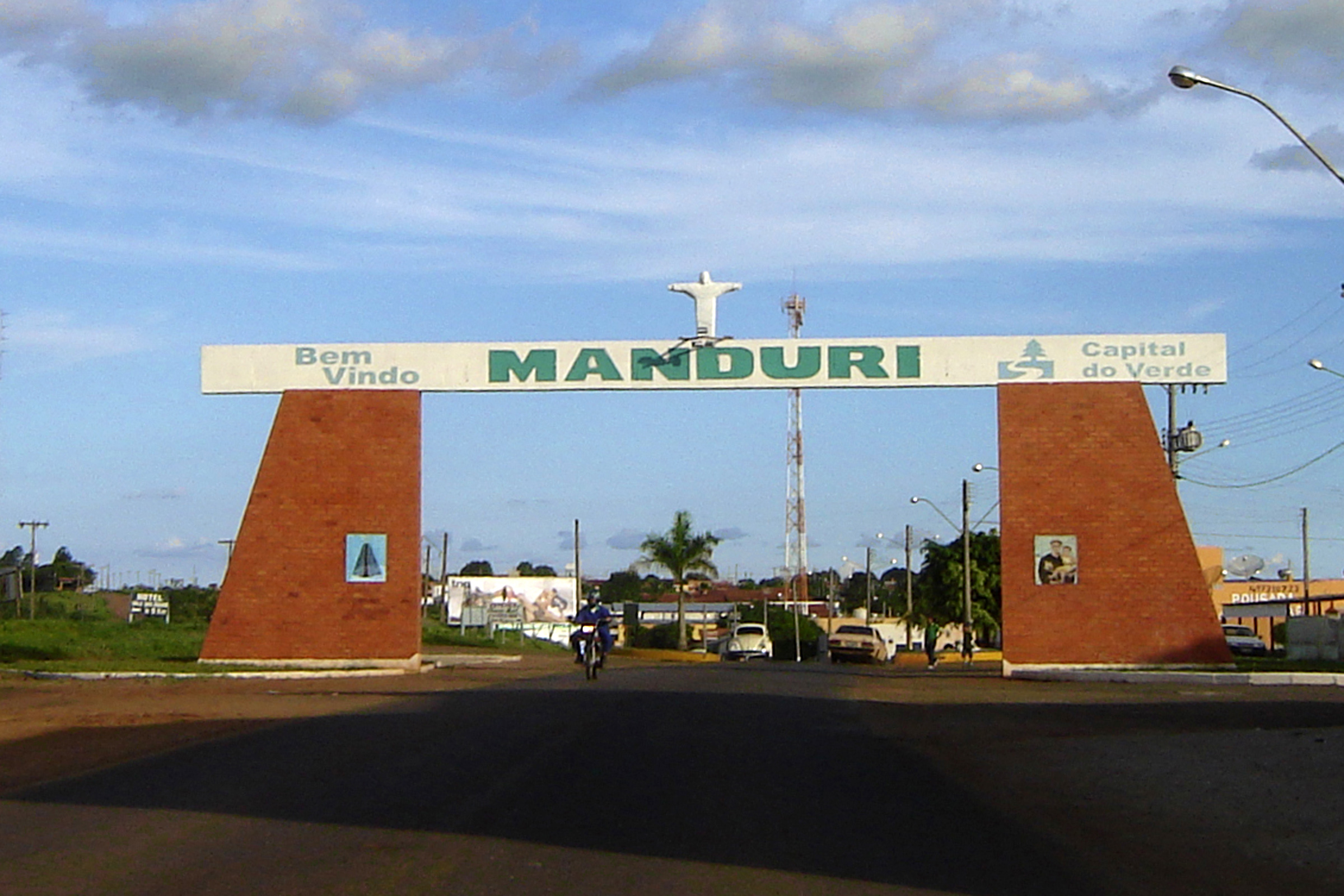

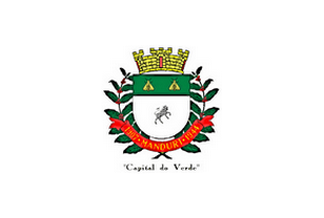
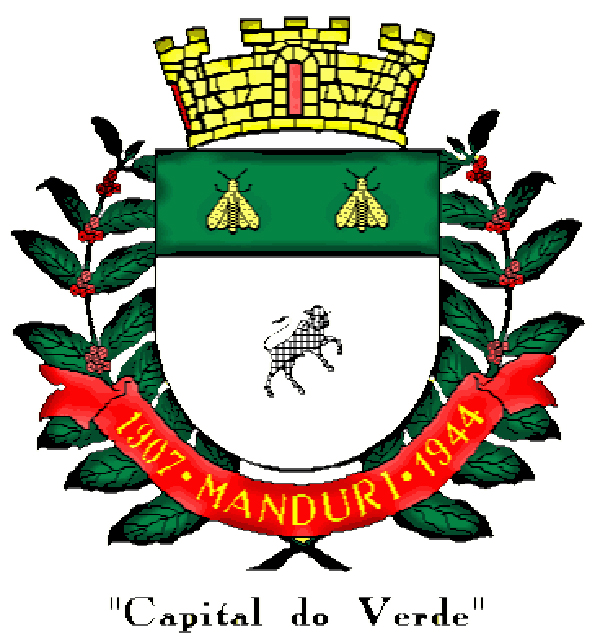
- Flag Coat of arms

- Location in São Paulo state

- Location in Brazil
- Coordinates: 23°0′12″S 49°19′19″W
- Country: Brazil
- Region: Southeast
- State: São Paulo

Area
  - Total: 229 km^{2} (88 sq mi)
- Elevation: 710 m (2,330 ft)

Population (2020)
  - Total: 9,910
  - Density: 43.3/km^{2} (112/sq mi)
- Time zone: UTC−3 (BRT)

Manduri is a municipality (município) in the state of São Paulo in Brazil. The population is 9,910 (2020 est.) in an area of 229 km^{2}. The elevation is 710 m.

== History ==
The municipality was created by state law in 1944.

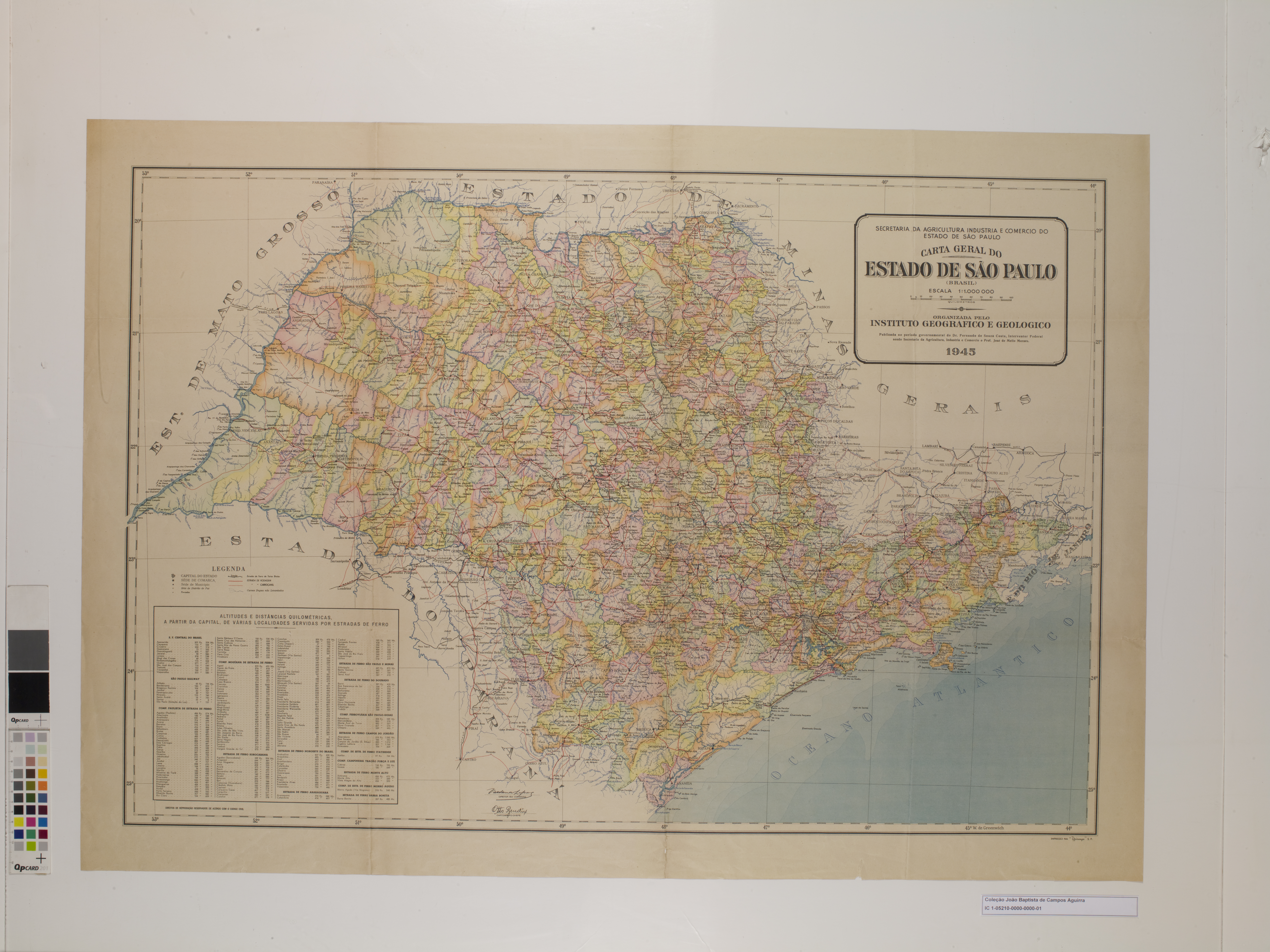
Map of the state of São Paulo (1944).

== Media ==
In telecommunications, the city was served by Companhia Telefônica Brasileira until 1973, when it began to be served by Telecomunicações de São Paulo. In July 1998, this company was acquired by Telefónica, which adopted the Vivo brand in 2012.

The company is currently an operator of cell phones, fixed lines, internet (fiber optics/4G) and television (satellite and cable).

== Gallery ==
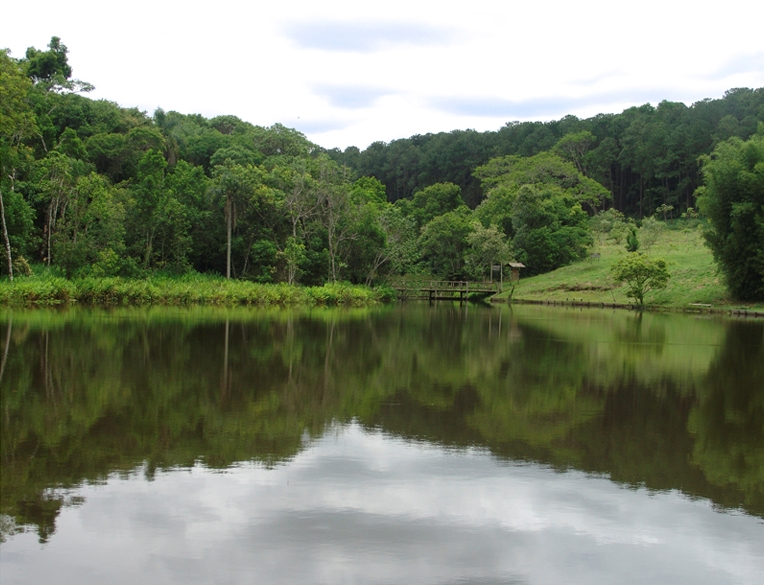
The forest, in Manduri

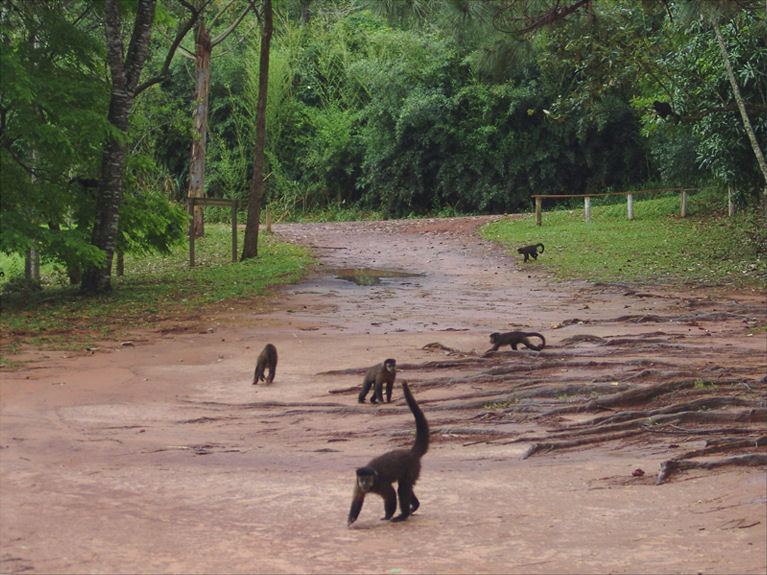
Black capuchin

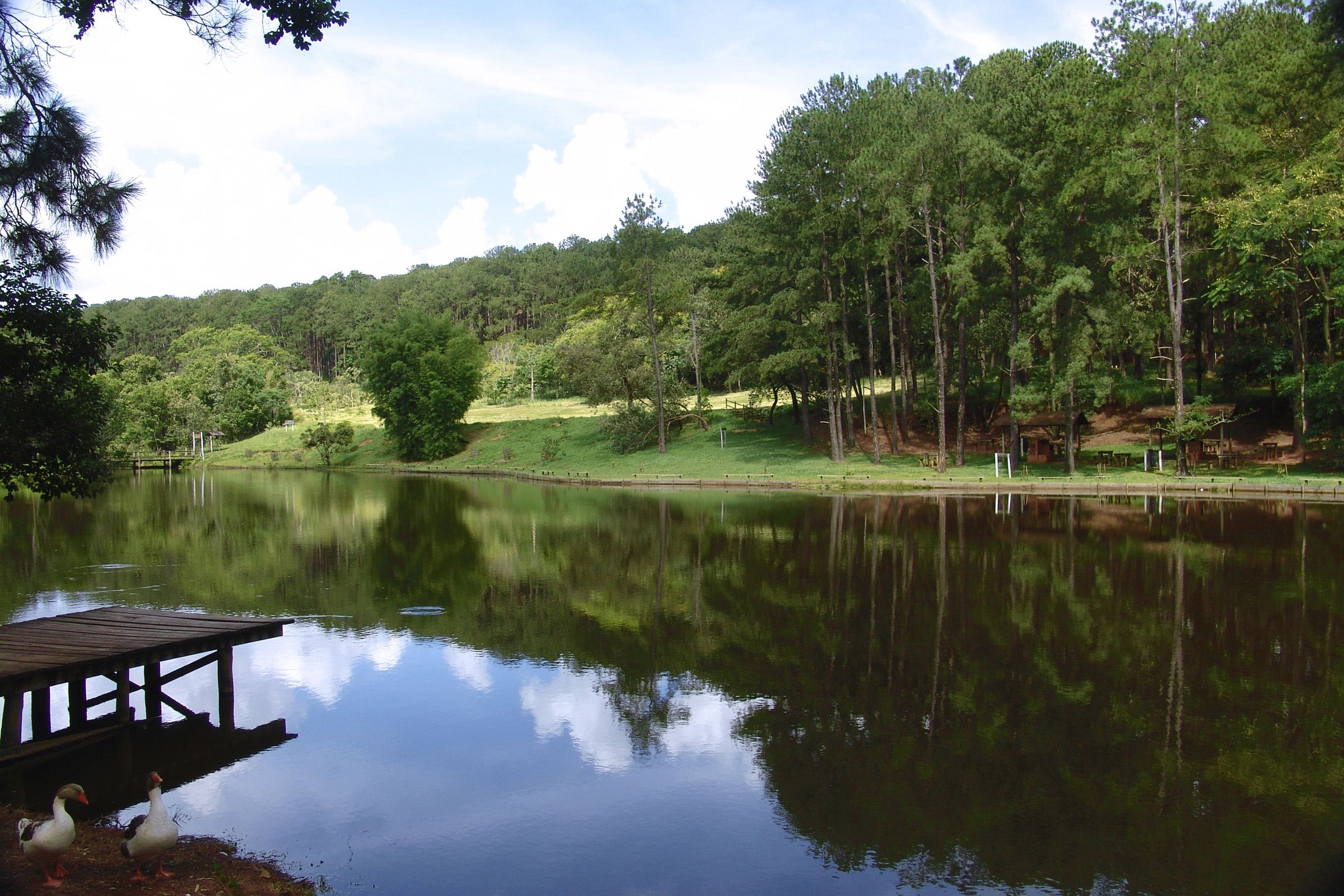
Forest

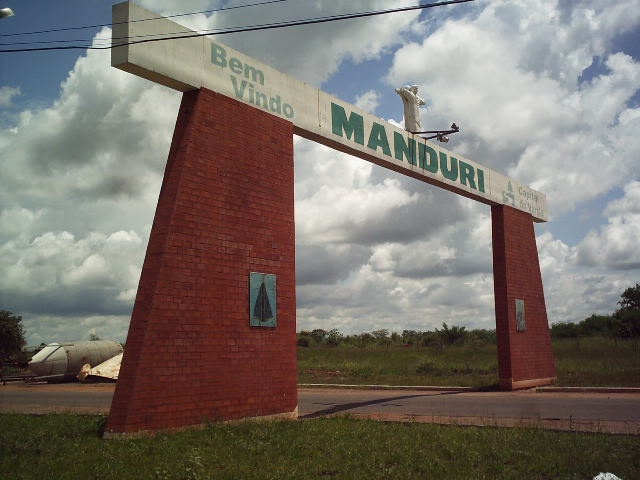
Portal

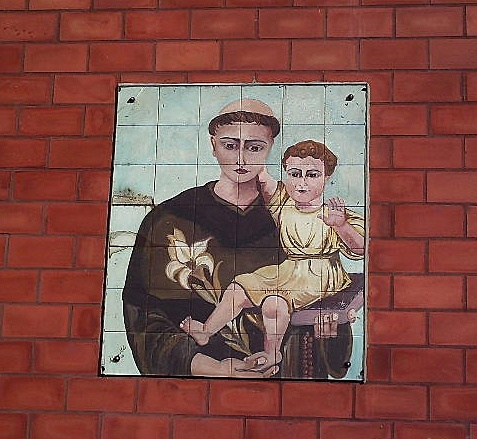
Detail in the portal, Santo Antonio picture

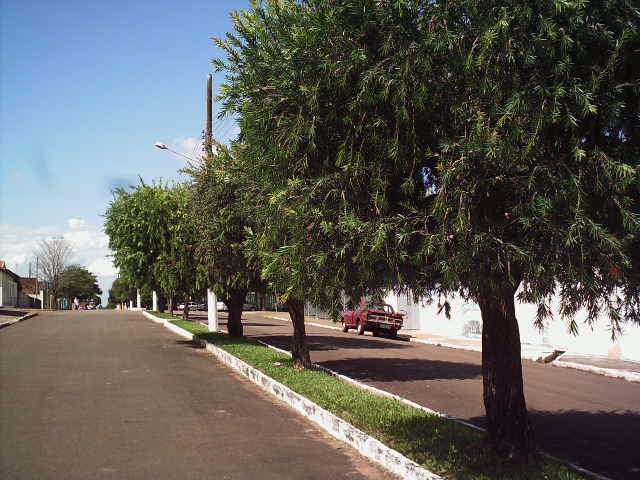
A street with trees

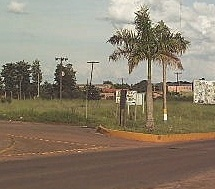
Intersection from Manduri to Águas de Sta. Bárbara

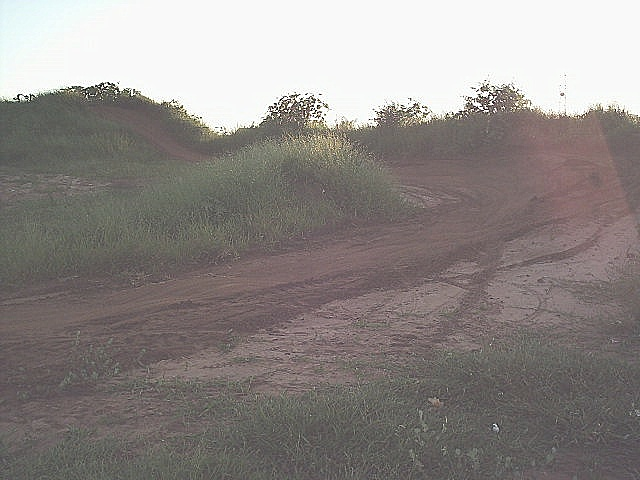
Motocross track

== See also ==
- List of municipalities in São Paulo
- Interior of São Paulo
