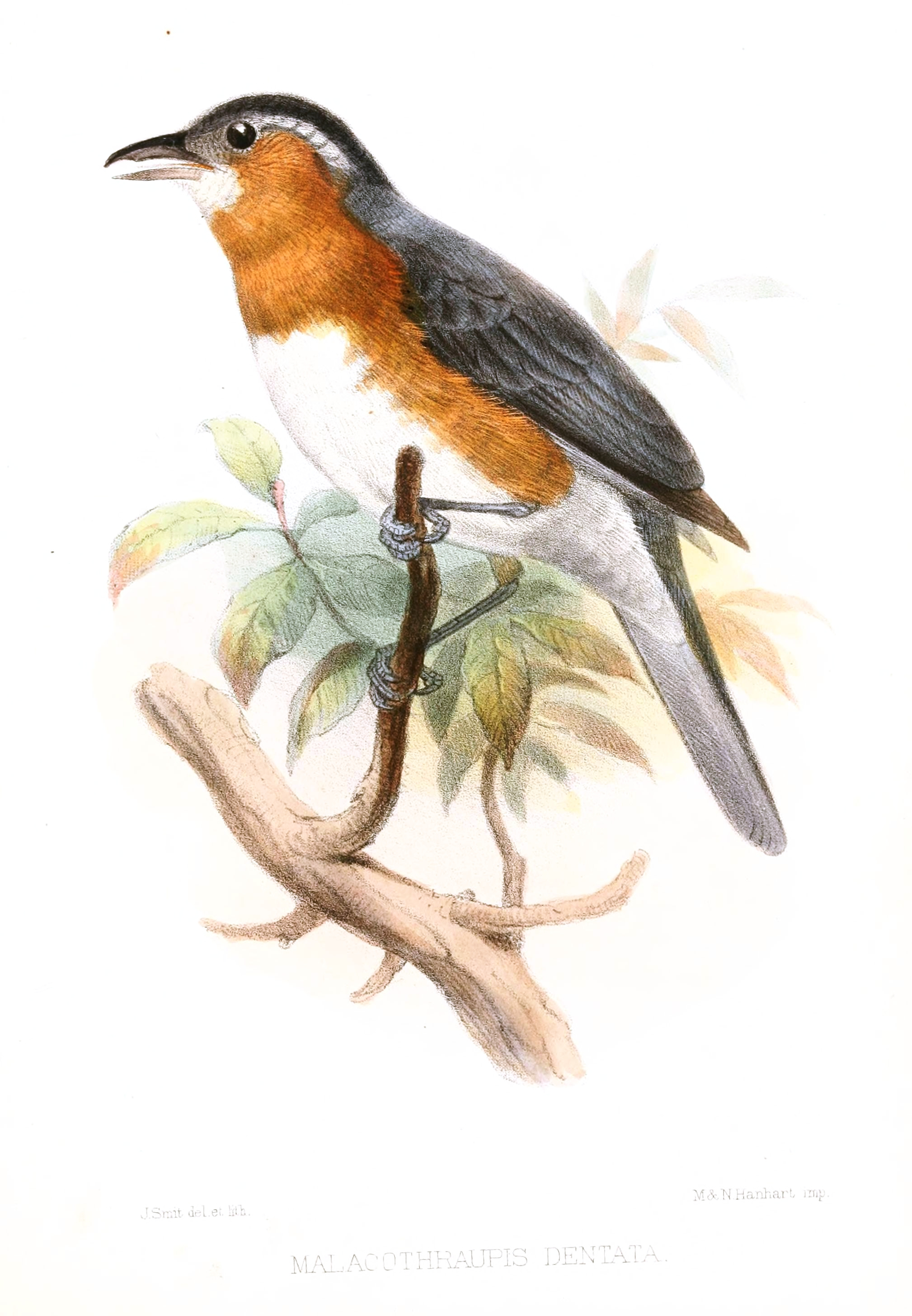
- Slaty tanager (Creurgops dentatus)

Scientific classification
- Kingdom: Animalia
- Phylum: Chordata
- Class: Aves
- Order: Passeriformes
- Family: Thraupidae
- Genus: Creurgops; Sclater, PL, 1858

Type species
- Creurgops verticalis Sclater, PL, 1858

Species
- See text

= Creurgops =

Genus of birds

Creurgops is a genus of Neotropical birds in the tanager family Thraupidae. They are found in the canopy of humid montane forest in the Andes of South America.

These are relatively large and heavy-billed tanagers. They are mainly slaty grey above and rufous below, except in the male slaty tanager where the underparts also are slaty grey. Males of both species have a crown patch, which is lacking in the females. They commonly participate in mixed-species flocks.

== Taxonomy and species list ==
The genus Creurgops was introduced in 1858 by the English zoologist Philip Sclater to accommodate the newly described rufous-crested tanager (Creurgops verticalis). The genus name combines the Ancient Greek κρεουργός (kreourgós) meaning "butcher" with ὤψ (ṓps) meaning "appearance". The genus now contains the following two species:

Image	Scientific name	Common name	Distribution
	Creurgops verticalis	Rufous-crested tanager	Colombia, Ecuador, Peru and Venezuela.
	Creurgops dentatus	Slaty tanager	Bolivia and Peru
