= Central Highlands (Central America) =

Geological region of Central America

The Central Arc is the name given for the string of mountains and volcanoes which run through the middle of Central America. The highlands are part of a circle of volcanoes known as the Pacific Ring of Fire that runs through the Aleutian Islands, South Pacific, and Central America, among others. The Central Arc runs about 1,100 kilometers and includes active volcanoes such as the Santa Maria volcano in Guatemala and the Arenal Volcano in Costa Rica.
