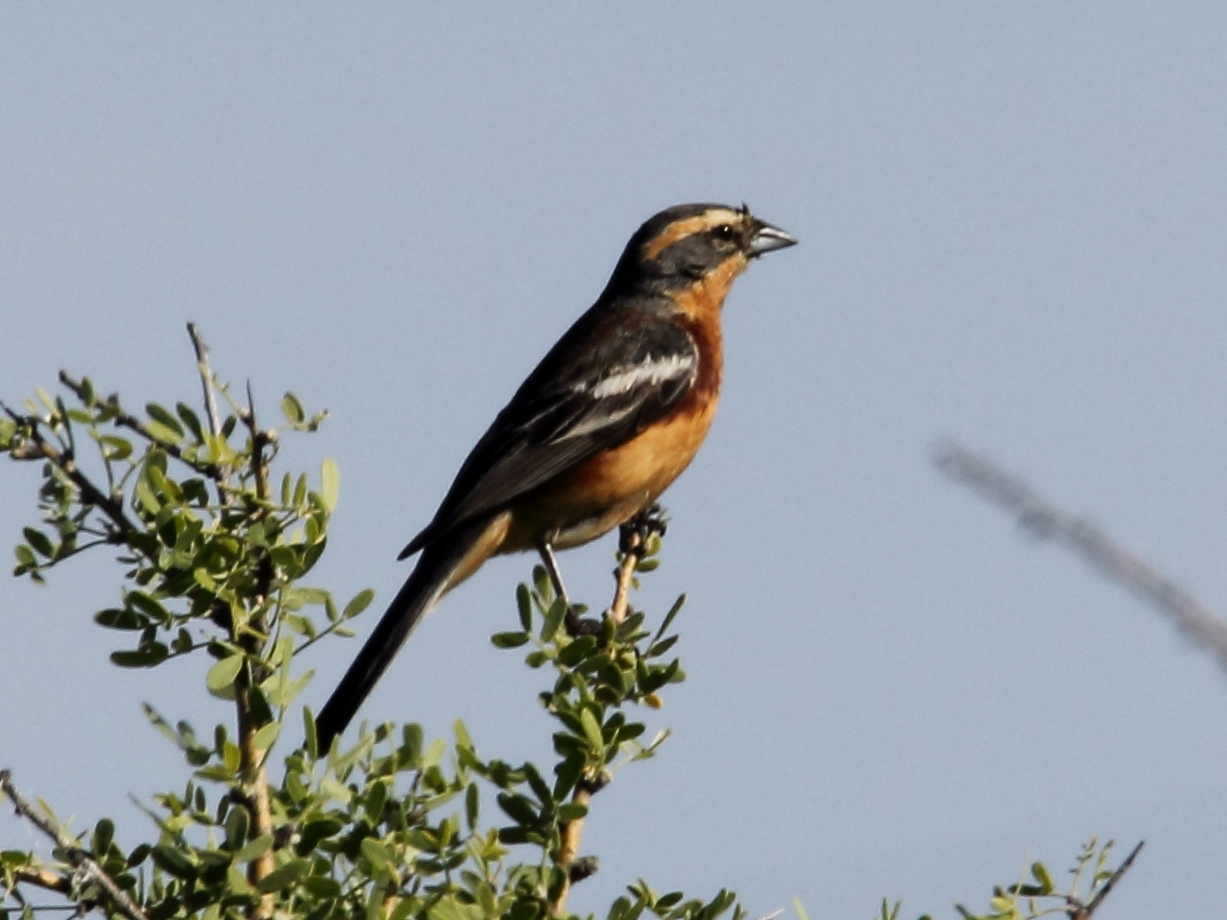

Conservation status
- Least Concern (IUCN 3.1)

Scientific classification
- Kingdom: Animalia
- Phylum: Chordata
- Class: Aves
- Order: Passeriformes
- Family: Thraupidae
- Genus: Poospiza
- Species: P. ornata

Binomial name
- Poospiza ornata (Landbeck, 1865)
- breeding Non-Breeding

= Cinnamon warbling finch =

Species of bird

The cinnamon warbling finch (Poospiza ornata) is a species of bird in the family Thraupidae, the tanagers and allies. It is endemic to Argentina but has occurred as a vagrant in Uruguay.

== Taxonomy and systematics ==
The cinnamon warbling finch has a somewhat complicated taxonomic history. It was formally described by the German ornithologist Christian Ludwig Landbeck in 1865 as Phrygilus ornatus on the basis of a specimen from the "plain between the Portillo guard and the houses of Melocoton". In 1873 Sclater and Salvin reassigned it to its present genus Poospiza in the family Fringillidae. By 1970 the genus had been reassigned to the family Emberizidae. Based on studies published between 1988 and 2011, beginning in 2012 Poospiza was moved to the tanager family Thraupidae.

The name of the genus is derived from the Ancient Greek poas, meaning "grass", and spiza, meaning "finch". The specific epithet ornata comes from the Modern Latin ornatus, meaning "adorned" or "decorated".

The cinnamon warbling finch and the Bolivian warbling finch (P. boliviana) are sister species. The cinnamon warbling finch is monotypic.

== Description ==
The cinnamon warbling finch is a medium-sized member of the genus Poospiza. It is about 13 cm (5.1 in) long and weighs about 10 to 15 g (0.35 to 0.53 oz). The species is sexually dimorphic but not dramatically so. Adult males have a mostly slate gray head with a pale cinnamon supercilium that widens behind the eye and a cinnamon crescent below the eye. Their upperparts are mostly grayish with a chestnut patch in the center of the back; the lower back and rump are paler than the upper back. Their outermost rectrices are white and the rest brownish gray. Their wing coverts are gray or brownish gray with white tips on the greater and median coverts that show as two large wing bars. Their chin and upper throat are cinnamon that becomes rufous on the lower breast and flanks and becomes cinnamon again on the belly. Adult females are paler than males, especially on their breast and flanks, and the chestnut patch on their back is paler and smaller than the male's. Both sexes have a dark brown iris, a black maxilla, a silver black mandible, and blackish legs. Juveniles generally resemble adult females but with a gray-streaked whitish breast and belly.

The cinnamon warbling finch is most similar to the rusty-browed warbling finch (P. erythrophryus), which shares the extreme northern portion of the former's non-breeding range. However, the rusty-browed warbling finch prefers a different habitat, the Yungas, and has a rufous supercilium instead of a cinnamon one.

== Distribution and habitat ==
The cinnamon warbling finch is almost entirely endemic to Argentina. Its overall range there extends from the northwest in Salta Province south to northern Río Negro and western Buenos Aires provinces and as far east as southern Entre Ríos and northern Buenos Aires provinces on the Uruguayan border. It has also been reported in southwestern Uruguay's Colonia Department; some authors have questioned those records but the South American Classification Committee has accepted the species there as a vagrant though not as a regular migrant.

During the breeding season the cinnamon warbling finch primarily inhabits arid woodlands and scrublands in the Monte Desert and taller scrublands in ravines in the Andean foothills. In the Monte Desert it favors mesquite (Prosopis flexuosa) woodlands. In the non-breeding season it inhabits moister woodlands and scrublands. In elevation it ranges from near sea level to 1,000 m (3,300 ft).

== Behavior ==
=== Movement ===
The cinnamon warbling finch is a complete migrant. It breeds in Argentina in an area roughly within a triangle formed by northeastern San Juan, northwestern Río Negro, and western Buenos Aires provinces. It migrates north and east into the other part of its overall range for the austral winter. Within both ranges it wanders in response to food availability. (Note that the map does not show the full eastern extent of its non-breeding range.)

=== Feeding ===
The cinnamon warbling finch feeds primarily on grass seeds, with smaller amounts of arthropods and fruits in its diet. It forages both on the ground and while clinging to grass stalks. It takes fruit and arthropods from trees and shrubs. It is usually single or in pairs during the breeding season and often in mixed-species flocks in the non-breeding season.

=== Breeding ===
The peak of the cinnamon warbling finch's breeding season appears to be December and January. Its nest is an open cup made from grass, other plant fibers, and spider web. Most nests are in shrubs. The usual clutch is three eggs though four are known. The one known incubation period was 10 days and fledging occurs eight to nine days after hatch.

=== Vocalization ===
The cinnamon warbling-finch's song is "a repeated series of 3-4 notes, with a buzzy nature timbre of voice, tzeew chweew tzew cheew, tzeew chweew tzew cheew...".

== Status ==
The IUCN has assessed the cinnamon warbling finch as being of Least Concern. It has a large range; its population size is not known and is believed to be decreasing. No immediate threats have been identified. "Available data in the central Monte Desert suggest that Cinnamon Warbling Finch may be highly sensitive to human activities that affect both vegetation cover and food abundance."
