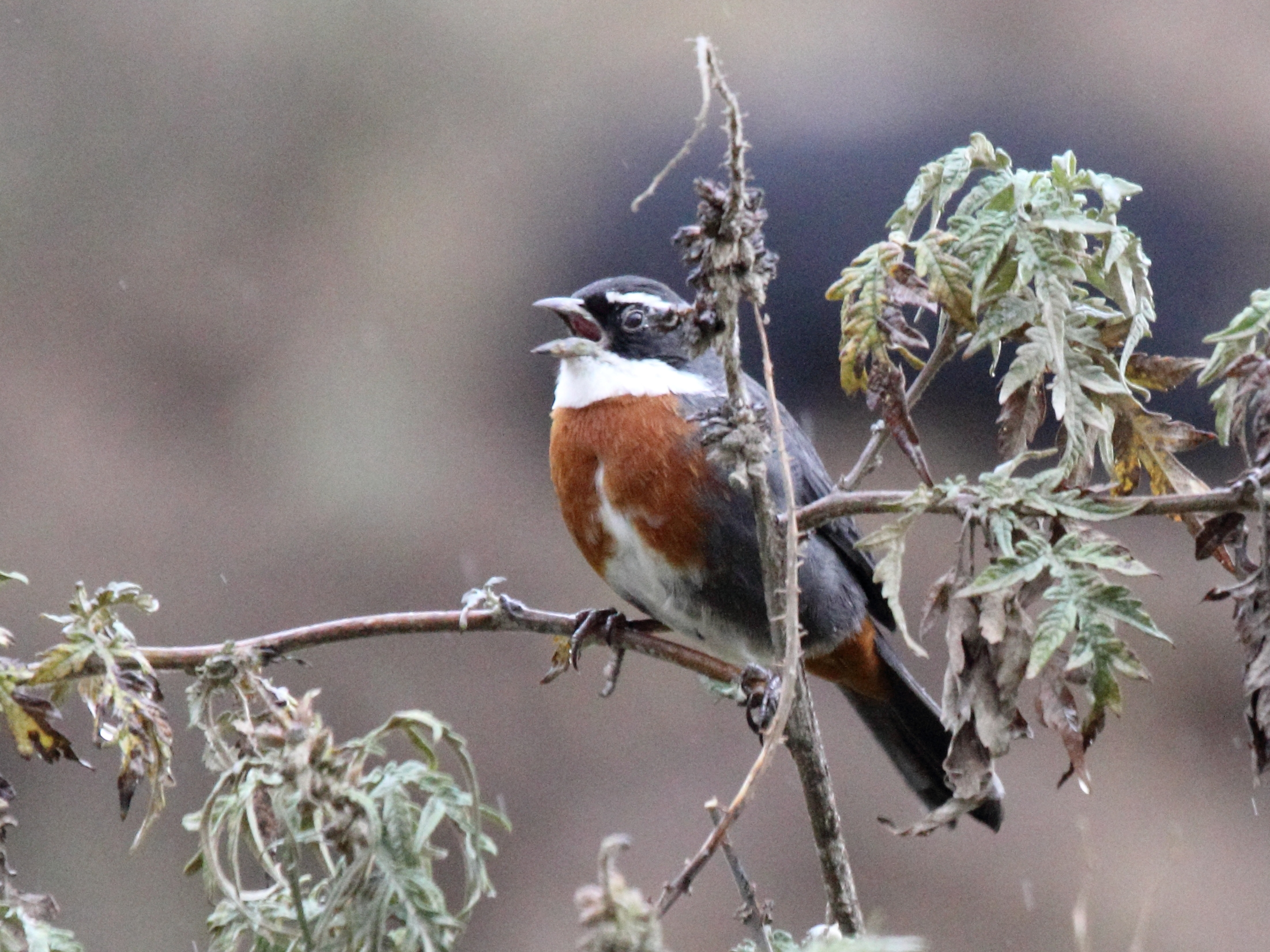

Conservation status
- Least Concern (IUCN 3.1)

Scientific classification
- Kingdom: Animalia
- Phylum: Chordata
- Class: Aves
- Order: Passeriformes
- Family: Thraupidae
- Genus: Poospizopsis
- Species: P. caesar

Binomial name
- Poospizopsis caesar Sclater, PL & Salvin, 1869

Synonyms
- Poospiza caesar

= Chestnut-breasted mountain finch =

Species of bird

The chestnut-breasted mountain finch (Poospizopsis caesar) is a species of bird in the family Thraupidae. It is endemic to Peru. Its natural habitat is subtropical or tropical high-altitude shrubland.

== Taxonomy ==
The chestnut-breasted mountain finch was formally described in 1869 by British ornithologists Philip Lutley Sclater and Osbert Salvin from two specimens collected by Henry Whitely. It was originally described in the genus of Poospiza, Greek for poa meaning grass and spiza meaning finch, and was coined as Poospiza caesar. It was later moved into the Poospizopsis genus in 2014 after a molecular phylogeny study of tanagers discovered that Poospiza was a polyphyletic genus, which moved the chestnut-breasted mountain finch and Poospiza hypochondria as a part of genus realignment. The type locality is located in Tinta in the department of Cusco. The species is monotypic: no subspecies are recognised.

== Description ==
The chestnut-breasted mountain finch ranges from 17 to 18.5 centimetres (6.7 to 7.3 in) long, with its wings around 8 centimetres (3.1 in) long. Both sexes look similar, consisting of a gray upperpart with the lore and auricular feathers colored black. They are separated from the crown by a distinctly white supercilium. Its throat is colored white and the breast is colored rufous with the feathers with pale buff tips following a fresh plummage. The flanks are colored a gray-brown. The middle underside is colored white while the rear underside is colored rufous. Juveniles look fairly similar to adults, excluding predominantly gray or black areas where those are tinged with a brown, along with a buff tinge on the throat. The irises of the chestnut-breasted mountain finch are a brown to dark brown. The bills are black at the maxilla, gray or black at the mandible, and a small gray area at the base of the beak. Its tarsi and toes are a dark gray.

The song of the chestnut-breasted mountain finches is described as "a chirping warble lasting two-to-three seconds and repeated some 10 seconds intervals", similar to the song of the golden-billed saltator found in the same area but featuring more complex and buzzy notes. No nonvocal sounds have been recorded. It has a generation length of 3.69 years.

== Distribution ==
The chestnut-breasted mountain finch is endemic to Peru, where it has been confirmed to be in the departments of Apurímac and Cusco. It is present in intermontane valleys ranging from 2,900 to 3,900 metres (9,500 to 13,000 ft) above sea level, mostly found in shrubland in said valleys.

== Behavior and diet ==
The chestnut-breasted mountain finch, in contrast to other members of Poospiza which are arboreal, forages on the ground, remaining close to the cover of shrubs. They typically sing on low to the ground, but may ascend higher into trees during territorial disputes. They are either found solitary or in pairs, but occasionally associates with mixed species flocks which contain other species of finches. Regarding breeding, not much is known about the species on seasonality or their nest and eggs, with only a male being collected in breeding condition in April 2011.

With no data being collected on the diet of the chestnut-breasted mountain finch, it is presumed that the diet contains a mixture of seeds and arthropods.
