= Red-rumped warbling finch =

The red-rumped warbling finch has been split into two species:.

- Gray-throated warbling finch, Poospiza cabanisi
- Buff-throated warbling finch, Poospiza lateralis
