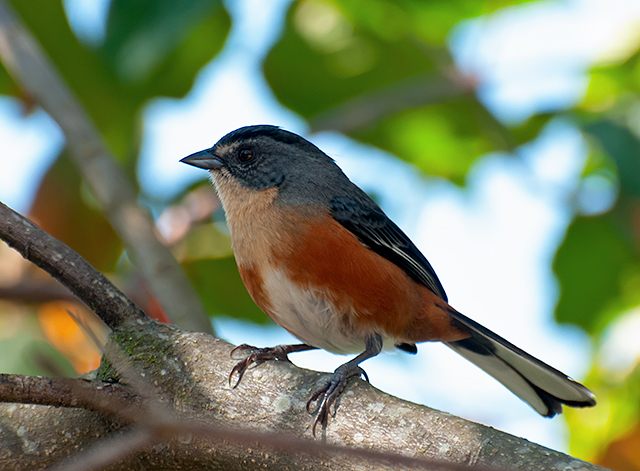
- Buff-throated warbling finch (Microspingus lateralis)

Scientific classification
- Kingdom: Animalia
- Phylum: Chordata
- Class: Aves
- Order: Passeriformes
- Family: Thraupidae
- Genus: Microspingus; Taczanowski, 1874

Type species
- Microspingus trifasciatus Taczanowski, 1874

Species
- See text

= Microspingus =

Genus of birds

Microspingus is a genus of warbler-like birds in the tanager family Thraupidae. They are found in highland forest in South America.

== Taxonomy and species list ==
A molecular phylogenetic study published in 2014 found that the genus Poospiza was polyphyletic. In the resulting rearrangement to create monophyletic genera the genus Microspingus was resurrected. It had been introduced in 1874 by the Polish zoologist Władysław Taczanowski with the three-striped hemispingus as the type species. The genus name combines the Ancient Greek mikros meaning "small" with spingos meaning "finch".

The genus Microspingus is the sister taxon to a clade containing the black-backed bush tanager in the monospecific genus Urothraupis and the Pardusco in the monospecific genus Nephelornis.

The genus contains the following eight species:

Image	Common name	Scientific name	Distribution
	Buff-throated warbling finch	Microspingus lateralis	Brazil.
	Grey-throated warbling finch	Microspingus cabanisi	eastern Brazil, far eastern Paraguay, far north-eastern Argentina, and Uruguay
	Rusty-browed warbling finch	Microspingus erythrophrys	Argentina and Bolivia
	Plain-tailed warbling finch	Microspingus alticola	Peru.
	Ringed warbling finch	Microspingus torquatus	Argentina, Bolivia, and Paraguay.
	Three-striped hemispingus	Microspingus trifasciatus	Bolivia and Peru.
	Black-capped warbling finch	Microspingus melanoleucus	Argentina, Bolivia, Brazil, Paraguay and western Uruguay.
	Cinereous warbling finch	Microspingus cinereus	Brazil.
