= Tucumán (disambiguation) =

Tucumán Province is a province in Argentina.

Tucumán may also refer to:

- San Miguel de Tucumán, the capital of the Argentinian province
- The Atlético Tucumán, a soccer team
- The Tucumán Rugby Club
- The Republic of Tucumán
- Tucumán amazon, a South American parrot
- Tucumán mountain finch. a South American tanager
- ARA Tucumán, an Argentine Navy Mendoza-class destroyer
