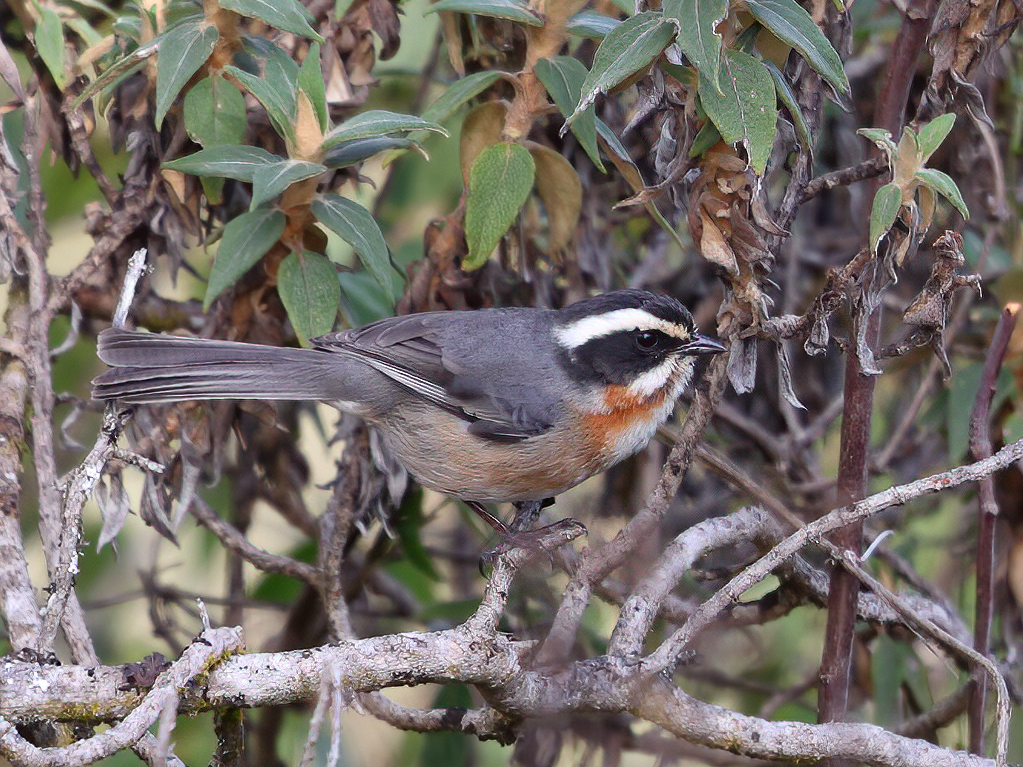

Conservation status
- Near Threatened (IUCN 3.1)

Scientific classification
- Kingdom: Animalia
- Phylum: Chordata
- Class: Aves
- Order: Passeriformes
- Family: Thraupidae
- Genus: Microspingus
- Species: M. alticola

Binomial name
- Microspingus alticola (Salvin, 1895)

Synonyms
- Poospiza alticola

= Plain-tailed warbling finch =

Species of bird

The plain-tailed warbling finch (Microspingus alticola) is a species of bird in the family Thraupidae. It is endemic to Peru.

Its natural habitat is subtropical or tropical moist montane forests. It is threatened by habitat loss.

== Taxonomy ==
The plain-tailed warbling finch was described in 1895 by English ornithologist Osbert Salvin from a specimen collected by Oscar Theodor Baron near the town of Huamachuco in La Libertad, Peru. He originally described it in the genus Poospiza, but it was later moved to Microspingus. It is monotypic.

== Description ==
The plain-tailed warbling finch is a small bird weighing 24-28g. It has a grey back, wings, and tail, a white breast and belly with tawny flanks and undertail covert, a rufous malar stripe, a white moustache and supercilium, variably yellow lores, and a black cheek and crown with a slaty cap.
