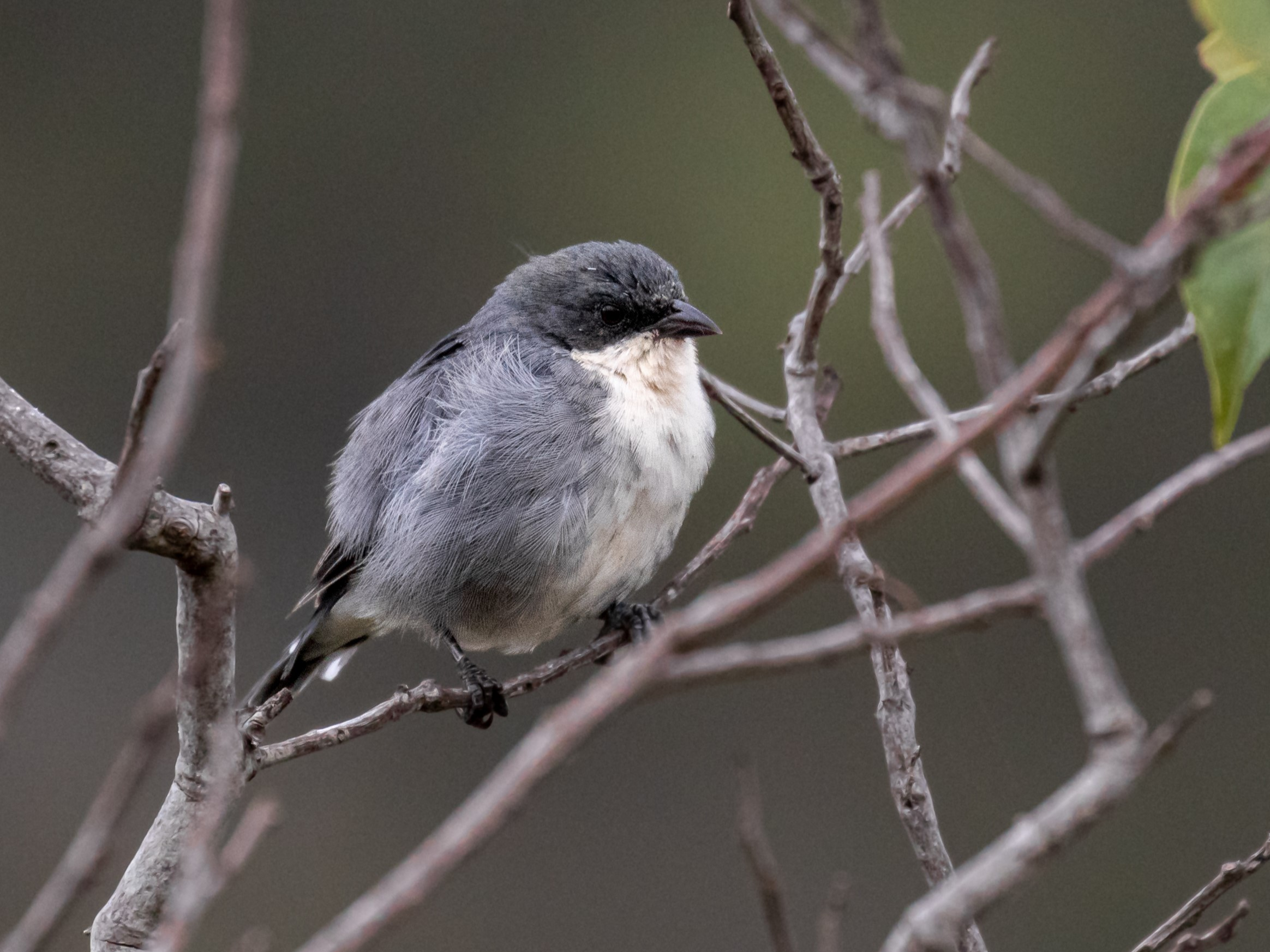
- Cinereous warbling finch at Botumirim, Minas Gerais, Brazil

Conservation status
- Least Concern (IUCN 3.1)

Scientific classification
- Kingdom: Animalia
- Phylum: Chordata
- Class: Aves
- Order: Passeriformes
- Family: Thraupidae
- Genus: Microspingus
- Species: M. cinereus

Binomial name
- Microspingus cinereus (Bonaparte, 1850)

= Cinereous warbling finch =

Species of bird

The cinereous warbling finch (Microspingus cinereus) is a species of bird in the family Thraupidae. It is endemic to Brazil. The term cinereous describes its colouration. Its natural habitat is subtropical or tropical dry lowland grassland. It is threatened by habitat loss.
