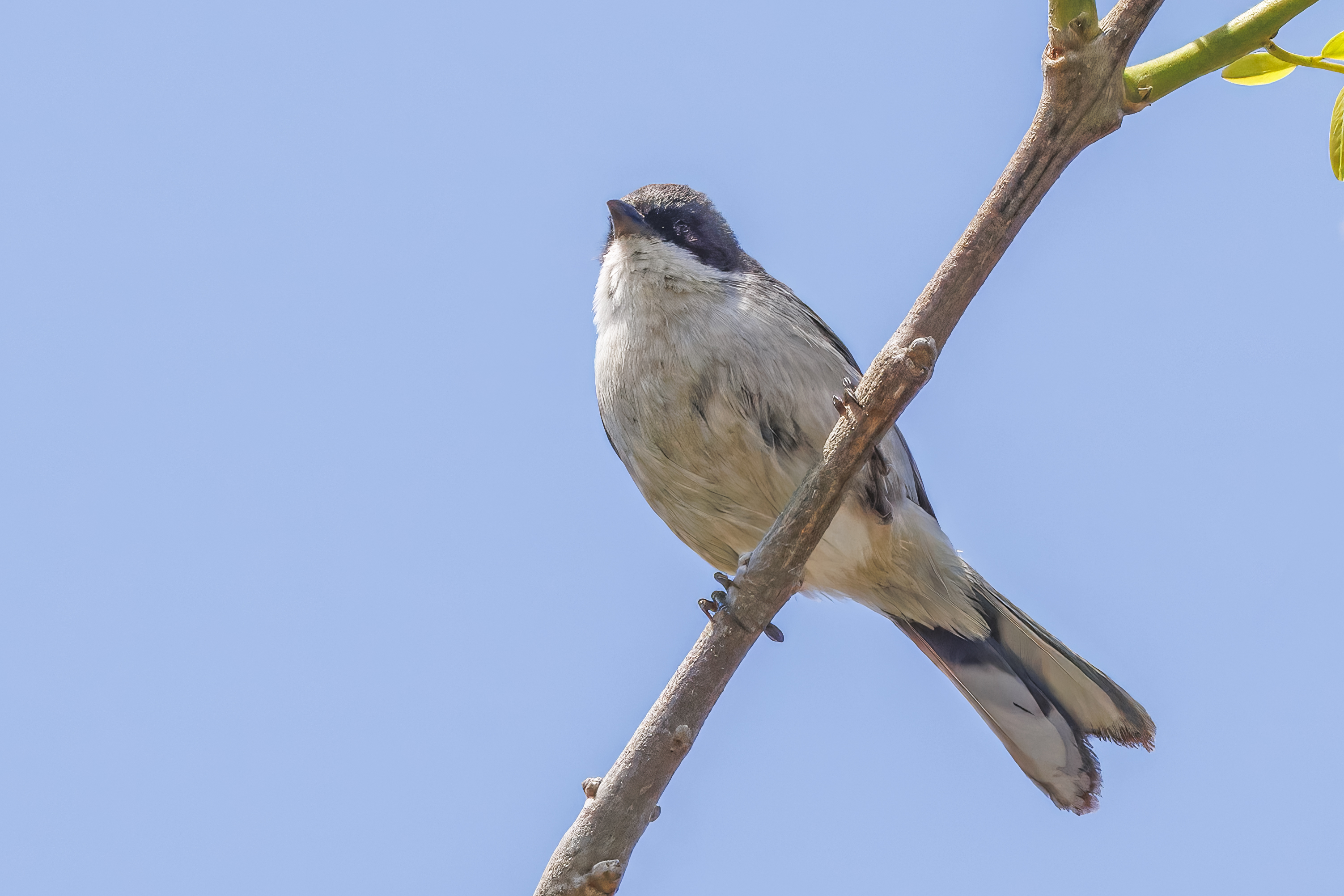

Conservation status
- Least Concern (IUCN 3.1)

Scientific classification
- Kingdom: Animalia
- Phylum: Chordata
- Class: Aves
- Order: Passeriformes
- Family: Thraupidae
- Genus: Microspingus
- Species: M. melanoleucus

Binomial name
- Microspingus melanoleucus (d'Orbigny & Lafresnaye, 1837)

= Black-capped warbling finch =

Species of bird

The black-capped warbling finch (Microspingus melanoleucus) is a species of bird in the family Thraupidae. It is found in Argentina, Bolivia, Brazil, Paraguay and western Uruguay. Its natural habitats are subtropical or tropical dry forests, subtropical or tropical dry shrubland, and subtropical or tropical high-altitude shrubland.
