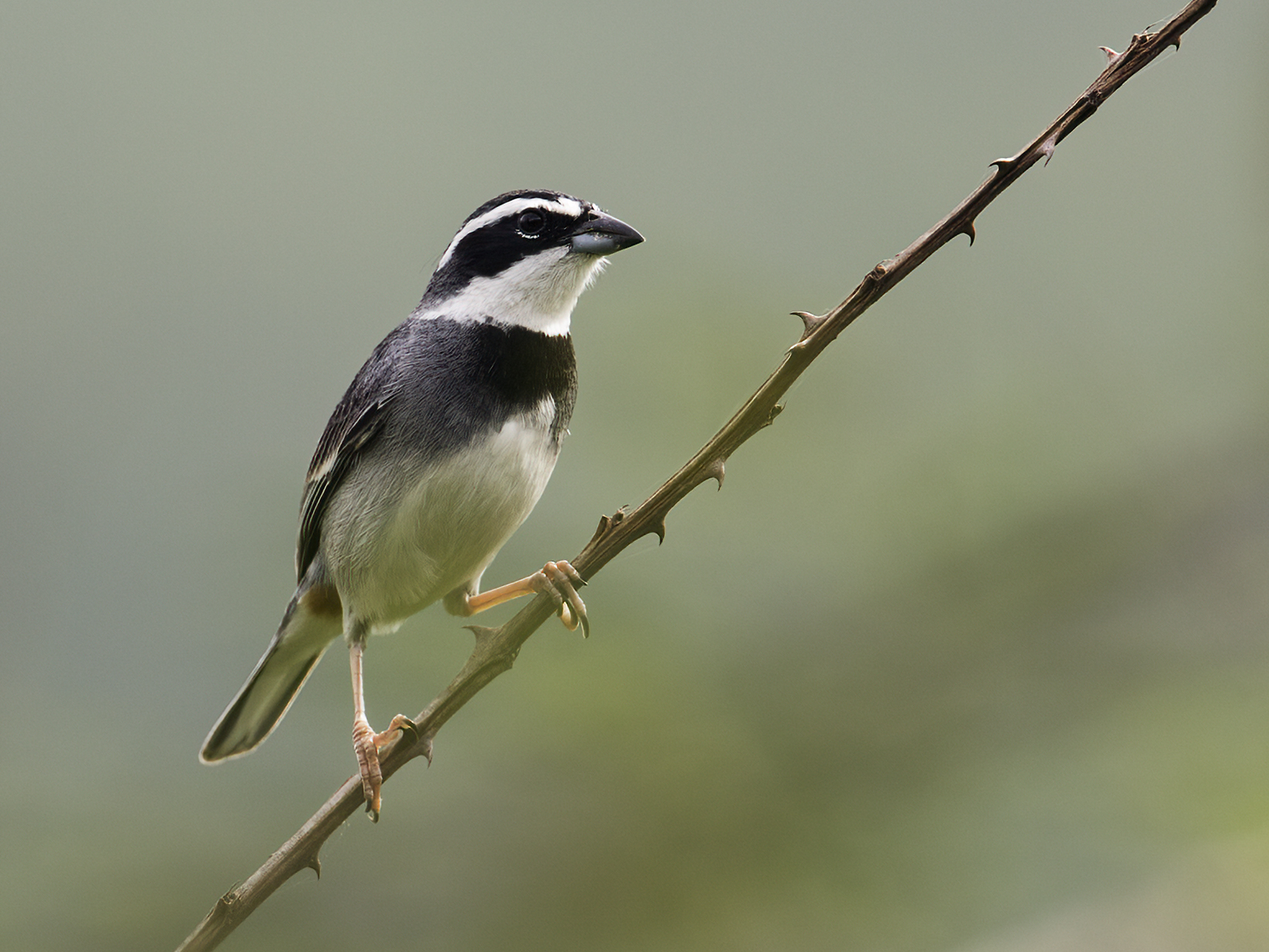
- Male
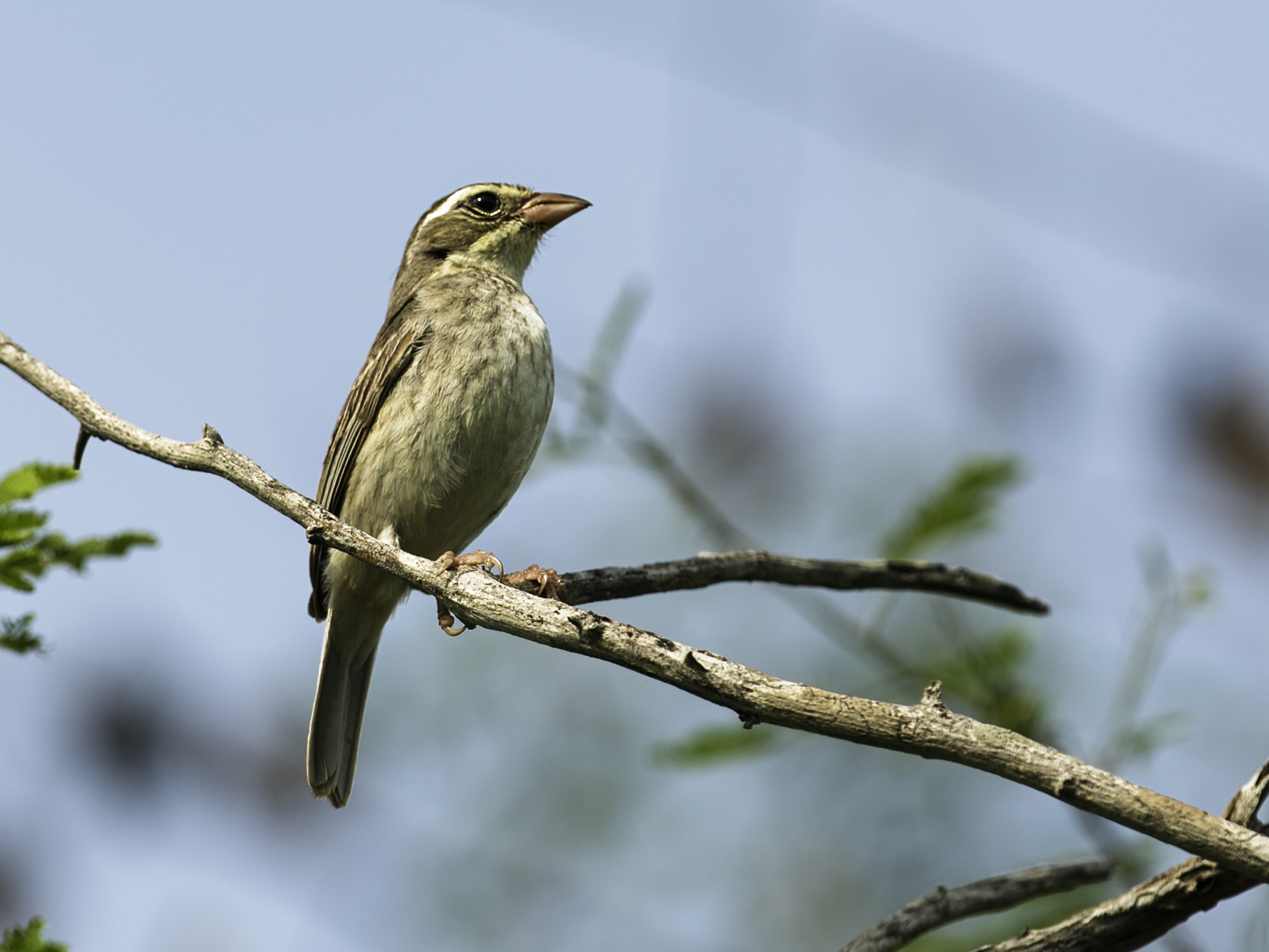
- Female

Conservation status
- Least Concern (IUCN 3.1)

Scientific classification
- Kingdom: Animalia
- Phylum: Chordata
- Class: Aves
- Order: Passeriformes
- Family: Thraupidae
- Genus: Poospiza
- Species: P. hispaniolensis

Binomial name
- Poospiza hispaniolensis Bonaparte, 1850

= Collared warbling finch =

Species of bird

The collared warbling finch (Poospiza hispaniolensis) is a species of bird in the family Thraupidae, the tanagers and allies. It is found in Ecuador and Peru.

== Taxonomy and systematics ==
The collared warbling finch has a somewhat complicated taxonomic history. It was formally described by Charles Lucien Bonaparte in 1850 with its current binomial Poospiza hispaniolensis. Bonaparte mistakenly attributed the specimen he described to "Domin.", by which he called the island of Hispaniola, hence the specific epithet hispaniolensis. In 1938 Hellmayr corrected the type location to Matucana, Peru. At least through this time the genus Poospiza was in the family Fringillidae. By 1970 the genus had been reassigned to the family Emberizidae. Based on studies published between 1988 and 2011, beginning in 2012 Poospiza was moved to the tanager family Thraupidae.

The collared warbling finch is monotypic.

== Description ==
The collared warbling finch is about 13.5 cm (5.3 in) long; one male weighed 16.5 g (0.58 oz). The species is sexually dimorphic. Adult males have a gray crown with a thin black stripe below it, a long white supercilium, a black "mask" from the bill through the ear coverts, and a broken white eye-ring. Their nape is gray and their upperparts brownish gray. Their tail is blackish with much white on the inner webs of the outermost pair of feathers. Their wings are mostly gray with pale brown edges on the tertials. Their wing's median coverts have pale gray tips and the greater coverts whitish buff tips; the tips show as two pale wing bars. Their chin and throat are white with a wide black band below them. Their flanks are gray and the middle of their breast, their belly, and their vent are white. Their crissum is mostly white with a cinnamon patch. Adult females have a similar facial pattern to males but with a brown crown and gray-brown mask. Their upperparts are brown with darker streaks. Their tail is brownish with the same white pattern as the male's. Their wings are brown with buffy wing bars and buffy edges on the flight feathers. Their breast band is smaller than the male's and grayish brown with dark streaks. The rest of their underparts are off-white with obscure pale brown streaks and no cinnamon on the crissum. Both sexes have a dark brown iris and a short triangular bill. Males have a blue-gray bill with a black tip and culmen and pinkish legs. Females have a dull pinkish bill with often a blackish tip and brownish pink legs.

== Distribution and habitat ==
The collared warbling finch is found on Isla de la Plata off the coast of Ecuador and on the mainland coastally from southern Manabí Province to southern Guayas Province including Isla de la Plata in the Gulf of Guayaquil. There are also scattered records south of there. Its range continues south through Peru coastally and in the Andean foothills to central Arequipa Department. The species inhabits dry scrublands and woodlands, scrub along watercourses, and hedgerows in agricultural land. In Ecuador it is mostly below an elevation of 300 m (1,000 ft) but reaches 1,450 m (4,800 ft) in the far southern province of Loja. It reaches 2,900 m (9,500 ft) in Peru.

== Behavior ==
=== Movement ===
The collared warbling finch is not a migrant but does move in response to patterns of rainfall.

=== Feeding ===
The collared warbling finch feeds primarily on invertebrates. It feeds both on the ground in dense cover and in trees. It usually forages in pairs, though the population on the Isla de la Plata regularly forms flocks.

=== Breeding ===
The collared warbling finch's breeding season has not been fully defined. In Ecuador it includes February to May and may also span July to September. Its nest has not been formally described. The clutch is three or four eggs. The incubation period, time to fledging, and details of parental care are not known.

=== Vocalization ===
One author describes the collared warbling finch's song as "a variable rich warble". Another expands on this with a "vigorous and far-carrying song a ringing, well-enunciated series of notes, e.g. swik-swik-sweéu" and notes that there are regional variations. The first author describes the species' call as "a low, gruff djer djer".

== Status ==
The IUCN has assessed the collared warbling finch as being of Least Concern. It has a large range; its population size is not known but is believed to be stable. No immediate threats have been identified. In Ecuador it is considered local and "most numerous on Isla de la Plata". It is "fairly common" in most of Peru but "scarce and local" in Arequipa Department.
