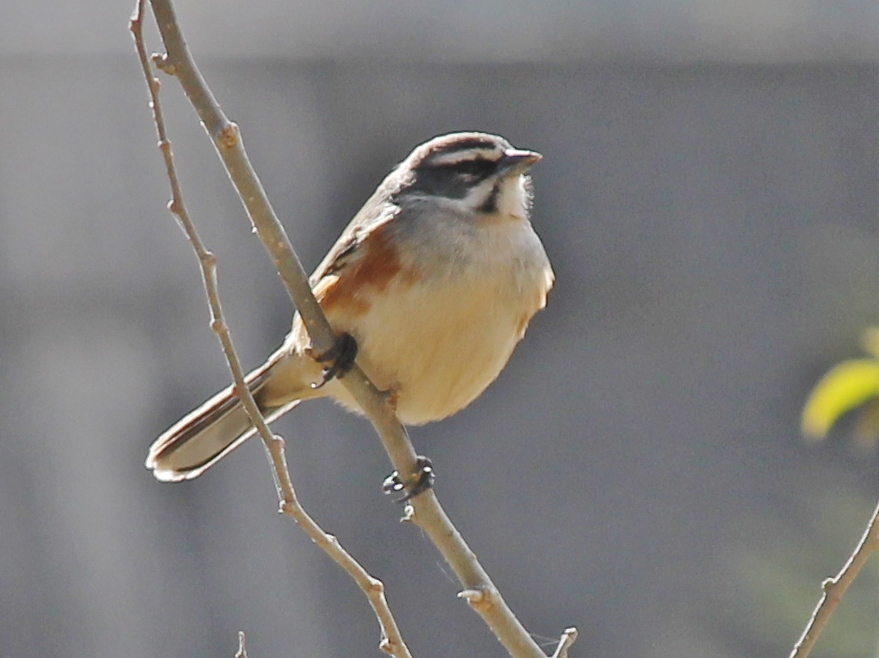
- Rufous-sided warbling finch (Poospizopsis hypocondria)

Scientific classification
- Kingdom: Animalia
- Phylum: Chordata
- Class: Aves
- Order: Passeriformes
- Family: Thraupidae
- Genus: Poospizopsis; Berlepsch, 1893

Type species
- Poospiza caesar Sclater, PL & Salvin, 1869

Species
- See text

= Poospizopsis =

Genus of birds

Poospizopsis is a genus of warbler-like tanagers. They are found in highland forest in South America.

== Taxonomy and species list ==
A molecular phylogenetic study of the tanager family Thraupidae published in 2014 found that the genus Poospiza was polyphyletic. In the subsequent reorganization two species from Poospiza were assigned to the resurrected genus Poospizopsis that had been introduced in 1893 by the German ornithologist Hans von Berlepsch with the chestnut-breasted mountain finch as the type species. The name of the genus combines Poospiza with the Ancient Greek opsis meaning "appearance".

The two species now placed in the genus are:

Genus Poospizopsis – Berlepsch, 1893 – two species
Common name	Scientific name and subspecies	Range	Size and ecology	IUCN status and estimated population
Rufous-sided warbling finch	Poospizopsis hypocondria (d'Orbigny & Lafresnaye, 1837)	Argentina and Bolivia.	Size: Habitat: Diet:	LC
Chestnut-breasted mountain finch	Poospizopsis caesar (Sclater, PL & Salvin, 1869)	Peru.	Size: Habitat: Diet:	LC
