= Slaty-backed hemispingus =

Conservation status
- Near Threatened (IUCN 3.1)

Scientific classification
- Kingdom: Animalia
- Phylum: Chordata
- Class: Aves
- Order: Passeriformes
- Family: Thraupidae
- Genus: Poospiza
- Species: P. goeringi

Binomial name
- Poospiza goeringi (Sclater, PL & Salvin, 1871)

Species of bird

The slaty-backed hemispingus (Poospiza goeringi) is a Near Threatened species of bird in the family Thraupidae, the tanagers and allies. It is endemic to Venezuela.

== Taxonomy and systematics ==
The slaty-backed hemispingus has a somewhat complicated taxonomic history. It was formally described in 1871 with the binomial Chlorospingus goeringi. By 1938 it had been reassigned to the genus Hemispingus. Based largely on a 2016 publication, taxonomic systems transferred H. goeringi to its present genus Poospiza.

The slaty-backed hemispingus is monotypic.

== Description ==
The slaty-backed hemispingus is 14 to 15 cm (5.5 to 5.9 in) long. The sexes have the same plumage. Adults have a mostly black head with a wide white supercilium that extends to the nape. Their mantle is slaty. The rest of their upperparts and their tail and wings are dark gray. Their underparts are rich tawny-rufous with an olive-brown tinge on the flanks. They have a dark brown iris, a small slender bill with a black maxilla and gray mandible, and long, heavy, pinkish gray to dark horn-gray legs.

== Distribution and habitat ==
The slaty-backed hemispingus is found in the Venezuelan Andes from northern Táchira north to central Mérida. It inhabits higher levels of wet montane forest and elfin forest, and has been recorded in dense shrubbery around more open fields. It is often associated with bamboo and might require it. In elevation it ranges between 2,600 and 3,200 m (8,500 and 10,500 ft) with one sight record at 2,300 m (7,500 ft).

== Behavior ==
=== Movement ===
The slaty-backed hemispingus is a year-round resident.

=== Feeding ===
The slaty-backed hemispingus feeds primarily on arthropods but also includes small fruits in its diet. It mostly forages in pairs, though sometimes singly or in small family groups, and often joins mixed-species feeding flocks. It forages in dense vegetation, from the ground up to about 5 m (15 ft) above it. It takes prey while perched and sometimes with a short upward leap to the underside of a leaf.

=== Breeding ===
Nothing is known about the slaty-backed hemispingus' breeding biology.

=== Vocalization ===
Though as of October 2026 xeno-canto had no recordings of slaty-backed hemispingus vocalizations, the Cornell Lab of Ornithology's Macaulay Library had 13. The slaty-backed hemispingus usually sings at dawn, and often pairs sing in duet. The song is "an energetic series of rapid staccato notes with plink notes throughout" than may continue for a minute or more.

== Status ==
The IUCN originally in 1994 assessed the slaty-backed hemispingus as Vulnerable and since 2020 as Near Threatened. Though its overall range is about 8,300 km^{2} (3,200 sq mi) it actually inhabits only about 3,760 km^{2} (1,500 sq mi) within it. Its estimated population of between 1500 and 7000 mature individuals is believed to be stable. "There has been extensive habitat loss in the Cordillera de Mérida for agricultural conversion, potentially to be compounded by proposed mining and road construction. However, this destruction has been concentrated in areas below the species's altitudinal range, although it may begin to affect its montane forests significantly in the future." It is "uncommon and easily overlooked". Its small area of occurrence includes two national parks.
