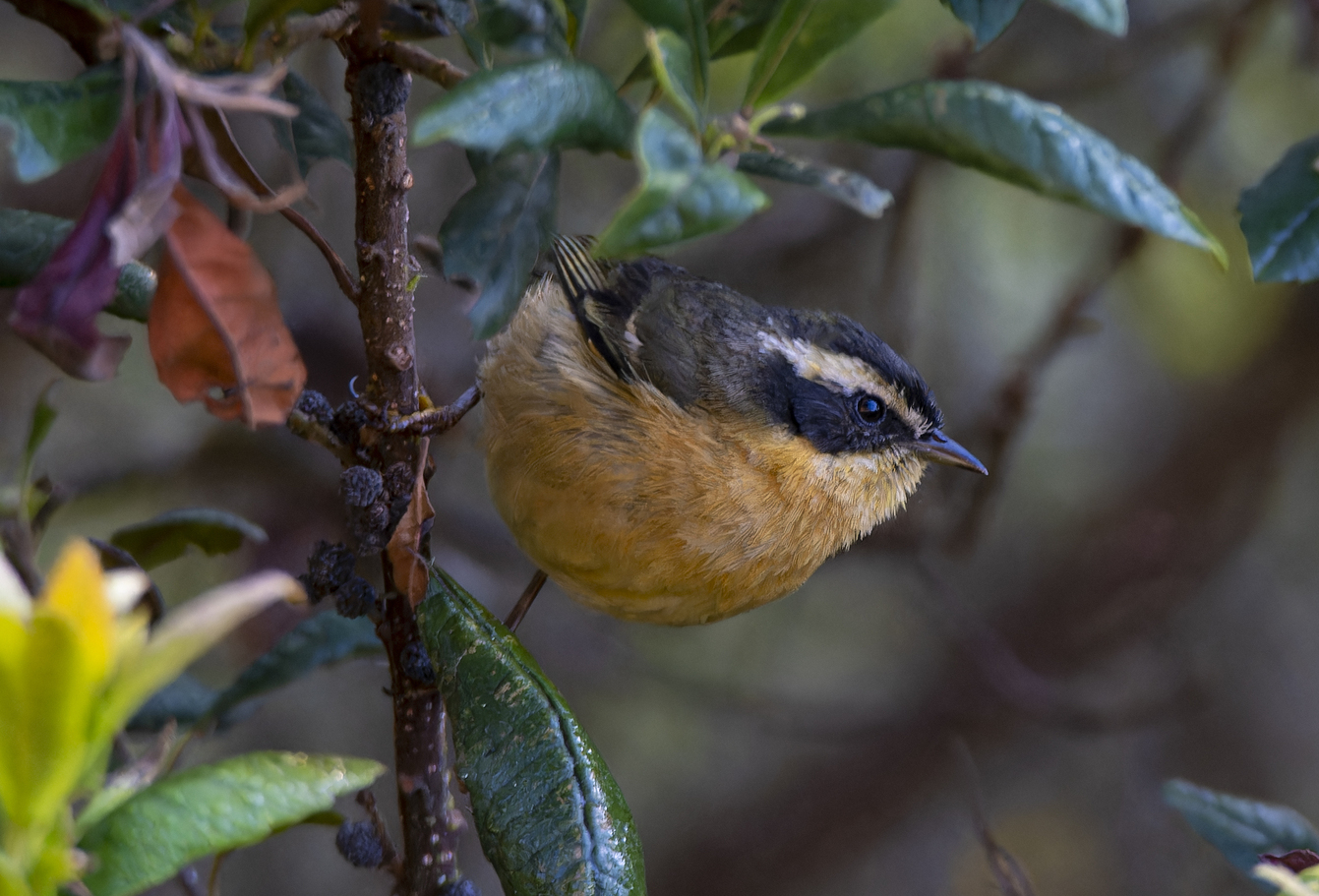

Conservation status
- Least Concern (IUCN 3.1)

Scientific classification
- Kingdom: Animalia
- Phylum: Chordata
- Class: Aves
- Order: Passeriformes
- Family: Thraupidae
- Genus: Microspingus
- Species: M. trifasciatus

Binomial name
- Microspingus trifasciatus Taczanowski, 1874

= Three-striped hemispingus =

Species of bird

The three-striped hemispingus (Microspingus trifasciatus) is a species of bird in the family Thraupidae.

It is found in Bolivia and Peru. Its natural habitat is subtropical or tropical moist montane forests.

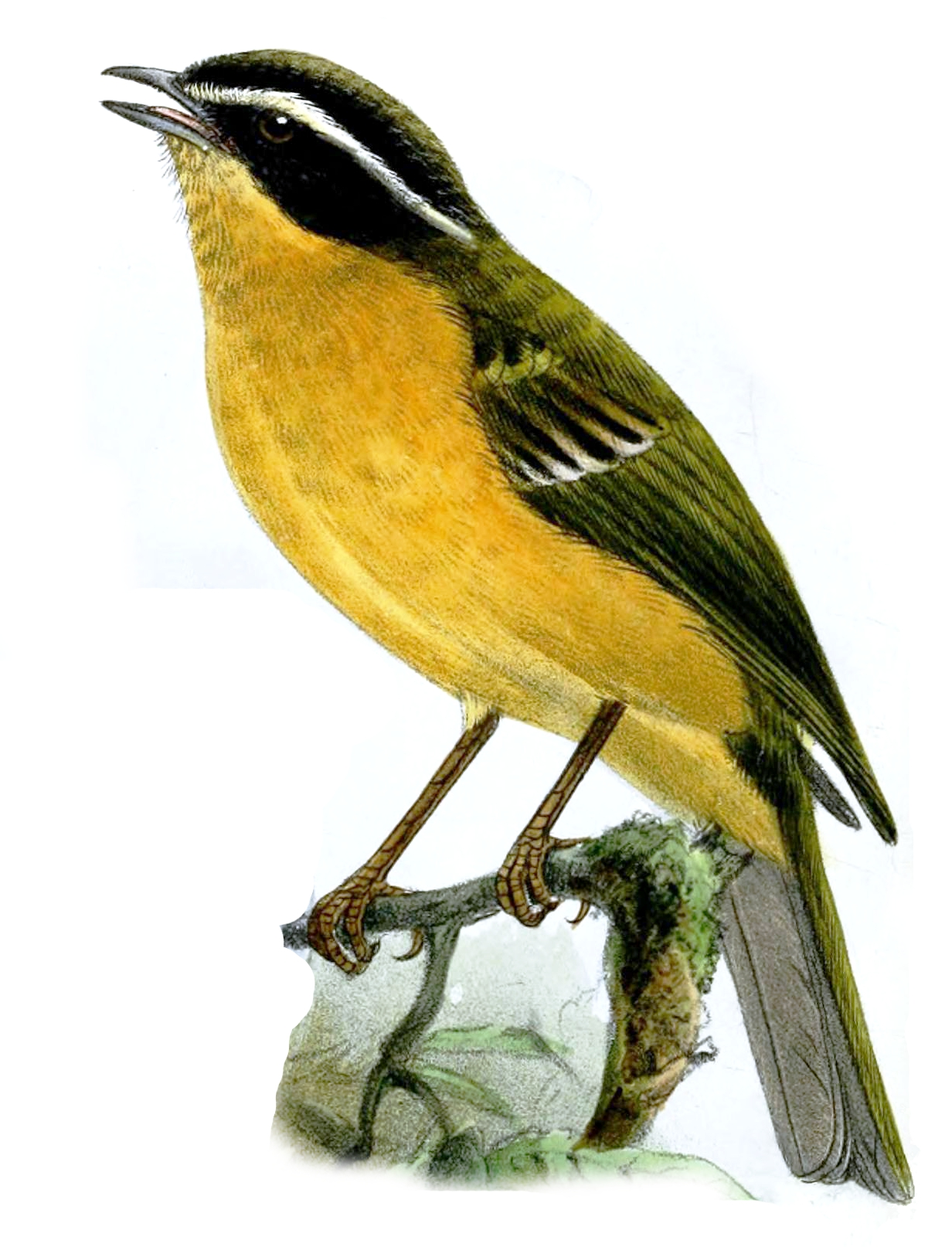
