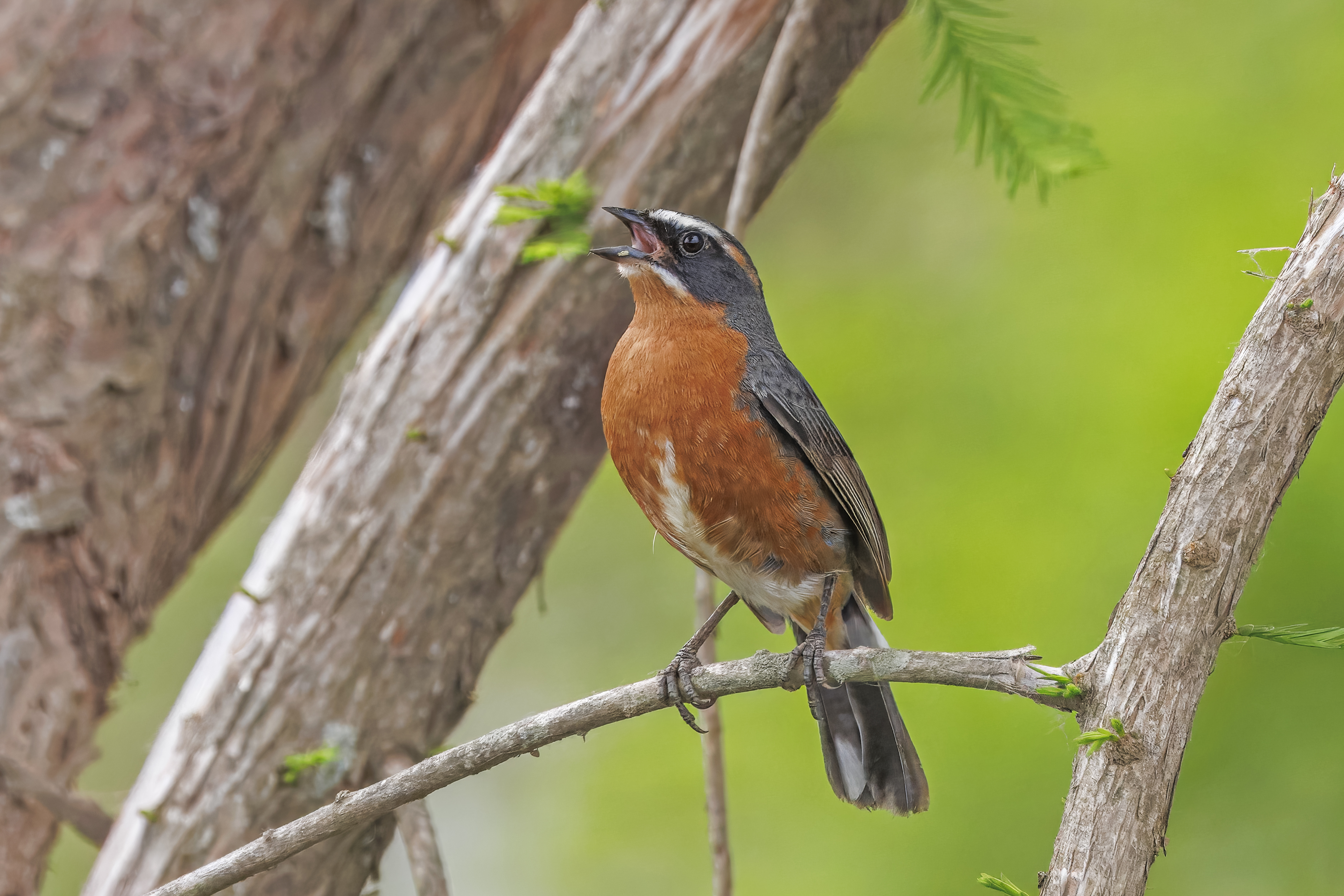
- Singing, near Buenos Aires, Argentina

Conservation status
- Least Concern (IUCN 3.1)

Scientific classification
- Kingdom: Animalia
- Phylum: Chordata
- Class: Aves
- Order: Passeriformes
- Family: Thraupidae
- Genus: Poospiza
- Species: P. nigrorufa

Binomial name
- Poospiza nigrorufa (d'Orbigny & Lafresnaye, 1837)
- Year-round Non-Breeding

= Black-and-rufous warbling finch =

Species of bird

The black-and-rufous warbling finch (Poospiza nigrorufa) is a species of bird in the family Thraupidae, the tanagers and allies. It is found in Argentina, Brazil, Paraguay, and Uruguay.

== Taxonomy and systematics ==
The black-and-rufous warbling finch has a complicated taxonomic history. It was formally described in 1837 with the binomial Emberiza nigro-rufa in the family Emberizidae. In 1938 Hellmayr lumped this species and what is now the black-and-chestnut warbling finch (P. whitii) as Poospiza nigro-rufa in the family Fringillidae. By 1970 the genus Poospiza had been returned to Emberizidae. The species was by then named P. nigrorufa. Based on studies published between 1988 and 2011, beginning in 2012 Poospiza was moved to the tanager family Thraupidae. Based on studies published up to 2017, systems again recognized P. whitii as a species separate from P. nigrorufa.

The black-and-rufous warbling finch is monotypic.

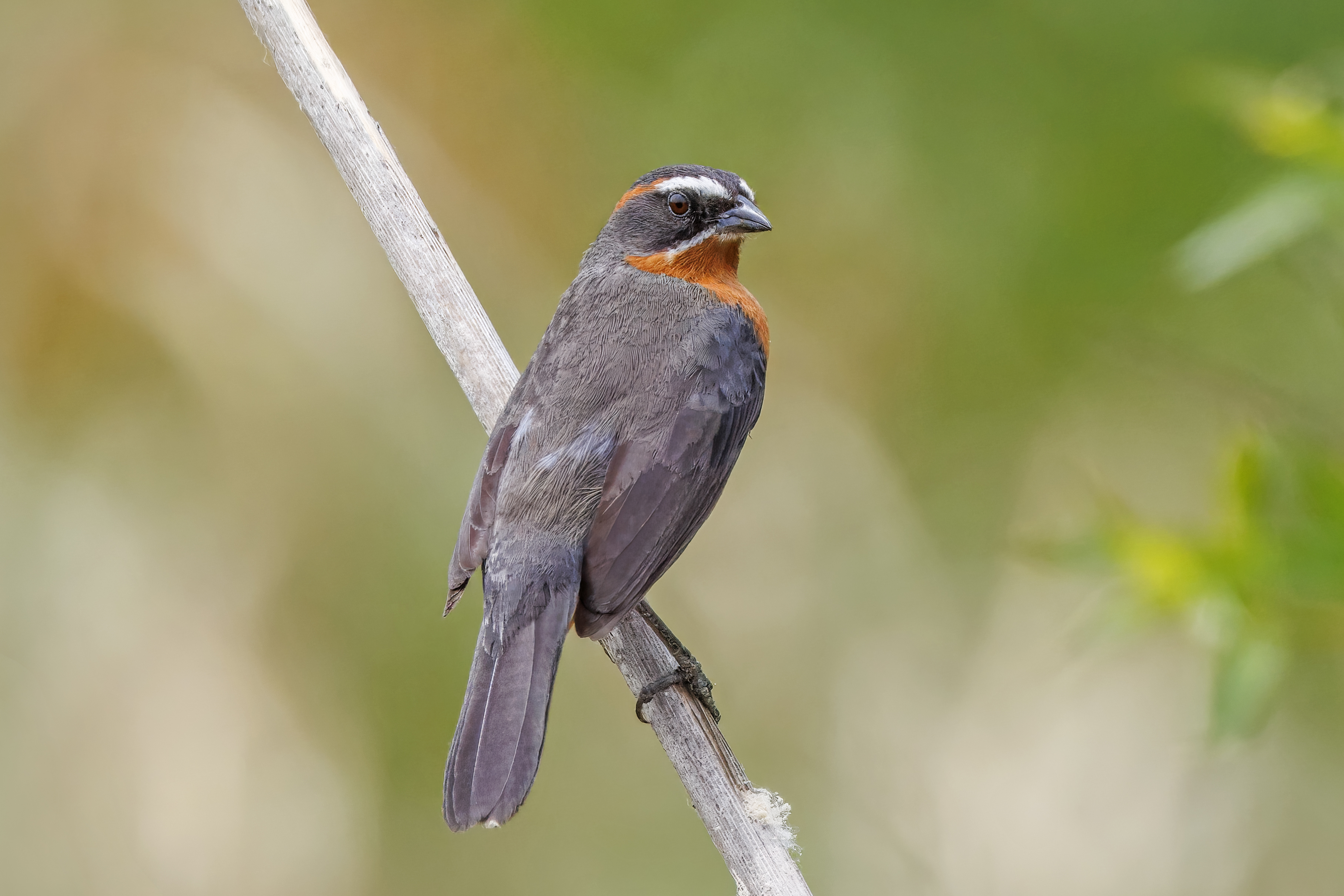
Showing its back

== Description ==
The black-and-rufous warbling finch is 15 cm (5.9 in) long and weighs 16.0 to 19.5 g (0.56 to 0.69 oz). The species is slightly sexually dimorphic. Adult males have a slate-tinged brownish gray crown and nape, a white supercilium that becomes rufous behind the eye, and a white "moustache" on an otherwise blackish face. Their upperparts and wings are slate-tinged brownish gray and their tail dark with white tips on the feathers. Their throat, breast, and flanks are cinnamon to rufous, the center of their belly white, and their undertail coverts tawny. Adult females are described as having more olivaceous upperparts and paler orange-tinged underparts than males but these apparent differences have been questioned. Both sexes have a brown or dark brown iris, a small, pointed, bill with a black maxilla and a gray mandible, and dark gray, blackish, or brownish legs. Juveniles have brown or olive-brown upperparts, underparts with dark brown streaks on a light brown background, and little or no white on the tail.

== Distribution and habitat ==
The black-and-rufous warbling finch is found from southeastern Brazil's Paraná state and southeastern Paraguay south through Uruguay and through northeastern Argentina as far as southern Buenos Aires Province. It inhabits open landscapes of grass, shrubs, and marsh vegetation and also open woodlands. It is usually found near water. In elevation it ranges from sea level to about 100 m (300 ft) in most of its range but reaches 900 m (3,000 ft) in Brazil.

Though one source includes Bolivia in the species' range others do not, and the South American Classification Committee has no records in the country.

== Behavior ==
=== Movement ===
The black-and rufous warbling finch is a year-round resident in most of its range. It is best known in Paraguay as a winter migrant but there is some evidence that it has bred in the country's extreme south.

=== Feeding ===
The black-and-rufous warbling finch's diet has not been studied but is assumed to be mostly seeds with some insects. It forages in dense vegetation or on the ground or floating vegetation near cover. It usually forages singly or in pairs and sometimes in family groups.

=== Breeding ===
The black-and-rufous warbling finch breeds between October and January in Argentina. Its nest is an open cup made from thick plant fibers lined with finer material including moss. It is typically in a bush or a grass clump within about 1 m (3 ft) of the ground. the clutch is two or three eggs that are gray-green with dark spots. The incubation period is about 14 days; the time to fledging is not known. Both sexes provision nestling but other details of parental care are not known. The shiny cowbird (Molothrus bonariensis) is a frequent brood parasite.

=== Vocalization ===
The black-and-rufous warbling finch's song is described as musical, a "whit-toweée-tew, whi-toweé-tew five or so times, to slow waltz-time". Another rendition is "sweet-sweet-je sweet-sweet-je sweet-sweet-je".

== Status ==
The IUCN has assessed the black-and-rufous warbling finch as being of Least Concern. It has a large range; its population size is not known but is believed to be stable. No immediate threats have been identified. It is considered "generally common" but "frequent to uncommon" in Brazil. It occurs in many national parks.
