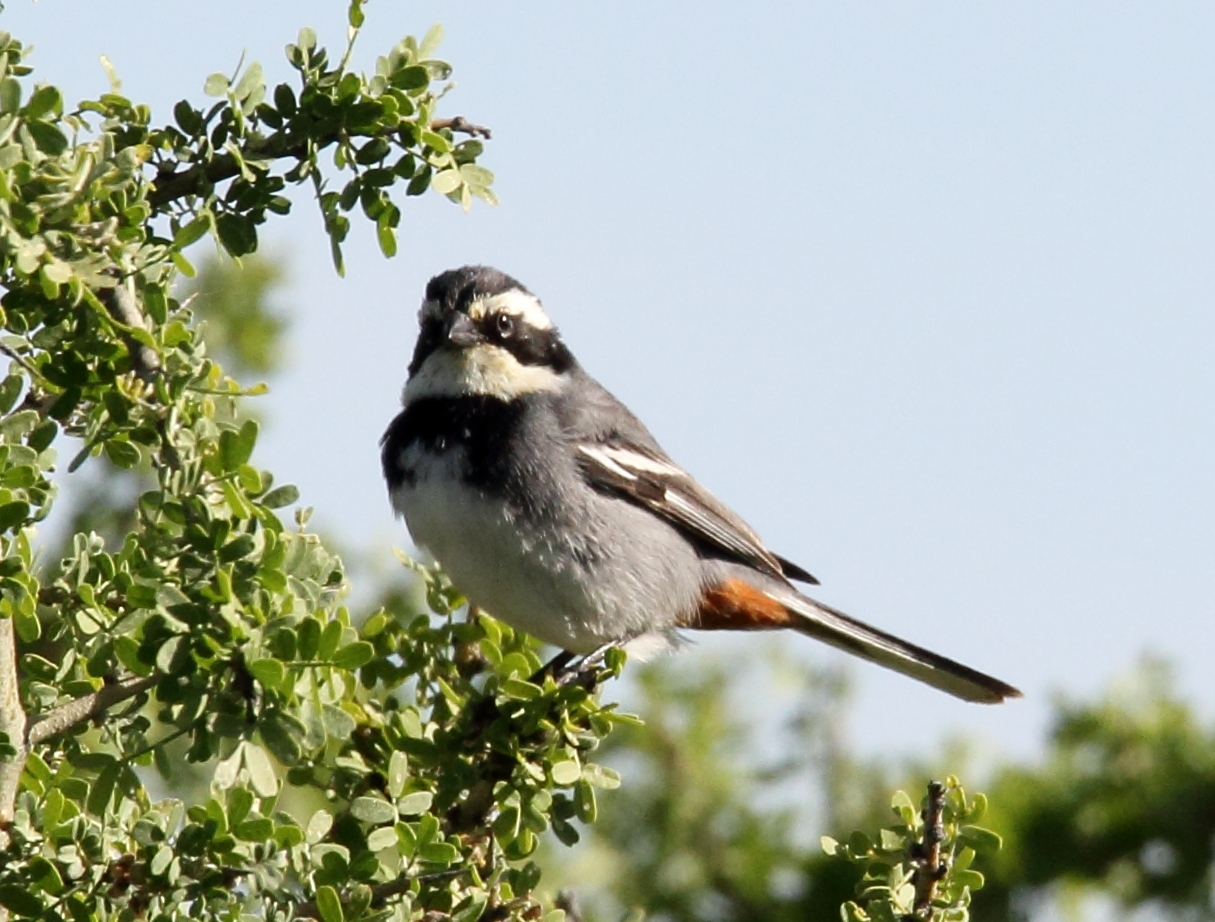

Conservation status
- Least Concern (IUCN 3.1)

Scientific classification
- Kingdom: Animalia
- Phylum: Chordata
- Class: Aves
- Order: Passeriformes
- Family: Thraupidae
- Genus: Microspingus
- Species: M. torquatus

Binomial name
- Microspingus torquatus (d'Orbigny & Lafresnaye, 1837)

= Ringed warbling finch =

Species of bird

The ringed warbling finch (Microspingus torquatus) is a species of bird in the family Thraupidae. It is endemic to Bolivia. Its natural habitats are subtropical or tropical dry forests, subtropical or tropical dry shrubland, and subtropical or tropical high-altitude shrubland.
