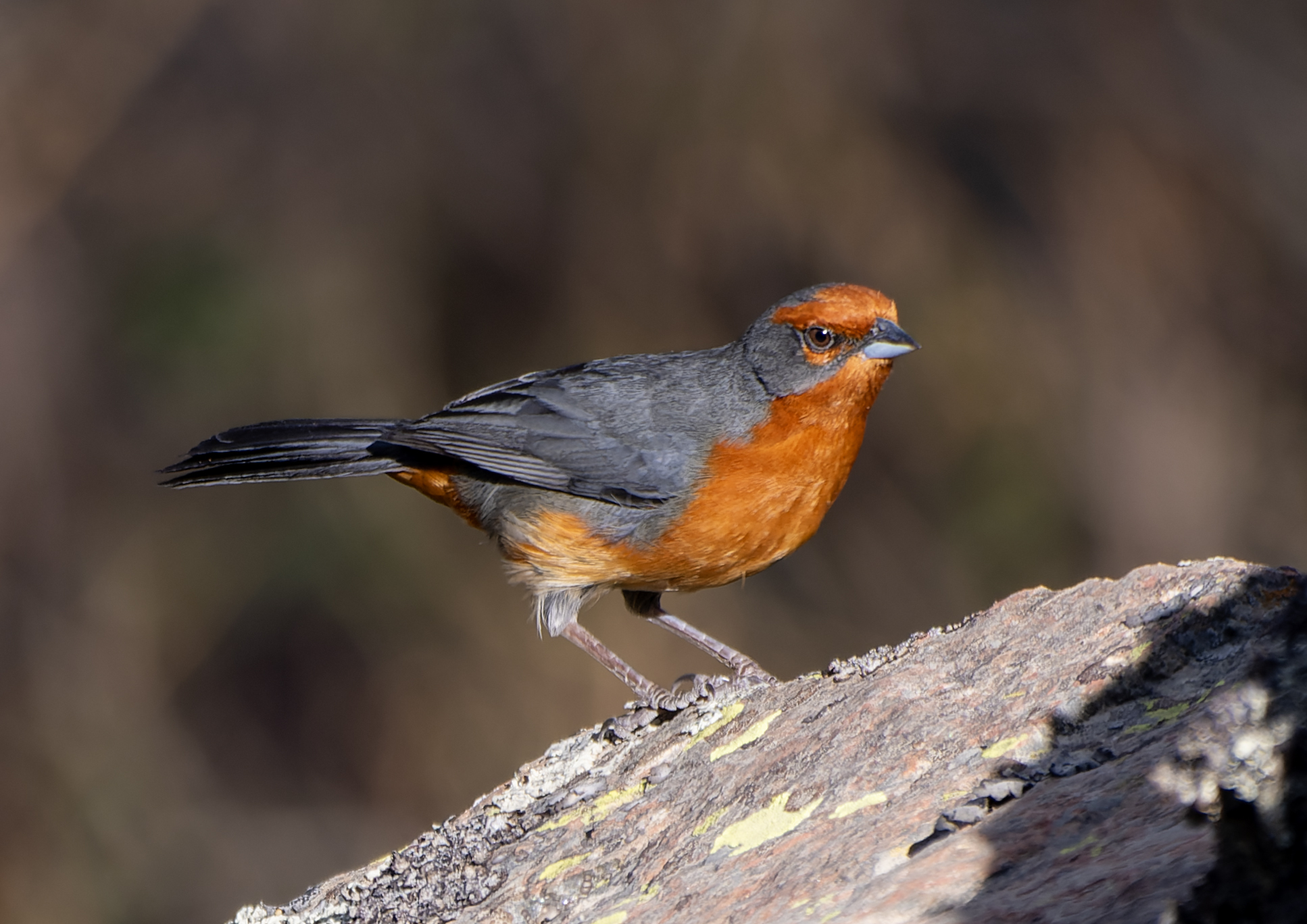

Conservation status
- Near Threatened (IUCN 3.1)

Scientific classification
- Kingdom: Animalia
- Phylum: Chordata
- Class: Aves
- Order: Passeriformes
- Family: Thraupidae
- Genus: Poospiza
- Species: P. garleppi

Binomial name
- Poospiza garleppi (Berlepsch, 1893)

Synonyms
- Compsospiza garleppi

= Cochabamba mountain finch =

Species of bird

The Cochabamba mountain finch (Poospiza garleppi) is a Near Threatened species of bird in the family Thraupidae, the tanagers and allies. It is endemic to Bolivia.

== Taxonomy and systematics ==
The Cochabamba mountain finch has a complicated taxonomic history. It was formally described by Hans von Berlepsch in 1893 with the binomial Compospiza garleppi. von Berlepsch erected the genus Compospiza, in the family Fringillidae, for this species. In 1970 Paynter merged Compospiza into Poospiza in the family Emberizidae. Between 2008 and the mid-2010s some taxonomic systems returned it to Compospiza and after that interval back to its present genus Poospiza. During the interval, beginning in 2012 both Compospiza and Poospiza were moved to the tanager family Thraupidae.

The Cochabamba mountain finch is monotypic.

== Description ==
The Cochabamba mountain finch is 17 to 18 cm (6.7 to 7.1 in) long. It is rather stocky and heavy and has a long tail. The sexes have the same plumage. Adults have a wide orange-rufous forehead that extends as a supercilium past the eye, an orange-rufous crescent under the eye, and an otherwise dark gray head. Their upperparts, tail, and wings are dark gray. Their throat and underparts are orange-rufous that is slightly lighter on the belly. They have a deep brown iris and dusky legs. Their maxilla is blackish and their mandible a paler blue-gray. Juveniles have grayish brown upperparts, a dusky-streaked buff throat and breast, and a buffy belly with thinner dusky streaks.

== Distribution and habitat ==
The Cochabamba mountain finch is found disjunctly in central and south-central Bolivia's Cochabamba, northern Potosí, and Chuquisaca departments. It inhabits a variety of landscapes in humid valleys between ranges of the Andes. These include canyons and slopes of somewhat open scrublands to very dense scrub, agricultural land that retains some native shrubs, and Polylepis and alder (Alnus) woodlands. In elevation it ranges between 2,700 and 4,200 m (8,900 and 13,800 ft) but is mostly found between 3,000 and 3,800 m (9,800 and 12,500 ft).

== Behavior ==
=== Movement ===
The Cochabamba mountain finch is a sedentary year-round resident.

=== Feeding ===
The Cochabamba mountain finch's diet is not known. It forages on the ground and not far above in it shrubs.

=== Breeding ===
The Cochabamba mountain finch breeds in the January to April rainy season. The female builds the nest, a cup made from dry grasses with a lining of animal hair and other soft fibers and an outer layer of moss or Polylepis bark. It is usually not far above the ground in a shrub's branch fork, in a clump of Cortaderia pampas grass, or on the ground in a Puya bromeliad. The clutch is one or two eggs that are off-white with much brownish spotting. The female incubates, for about 14 days. Fledging occurs about 18 days after hatch and both parents provision nestlings.

=== Vocalization ===
The male Cochabamba mountain finch's principle song is "a series of 3–5 stereotypical soft notes, generally increasing slightly in pitch, including [a] high-pitched introductory note followed by warbled whistles, tzeet twooo–swee...tzeet twoo–swee...". The species' call is "a high-pitched, soft ascending sweep".

== Status ==
The IUCN originally in 1988 assessed the Cochabamba mountain finch as Threatened, then in 1994 as Endangered, and since 2021 as Near Threatened. It has a small overall range of about 14,000 km^{2} (5,400 sq mi) but its actual area of occupancy is not known. Its range is fragmented and its estimated population of between 270 and 2700 mature individuals is believed to be decreasing. "Settlement and agricultural conversion have already had a dramatic effect on the species's habitat, and further expansion threatens remaining habitat fragments. The species's preferred habitat, comprising areas of mixed woodland below the Polylepis zone, is also the most suitable for conversion to agriculture...Although the species persists in moderately altered landscapes, it is lost from areas in which all native vegetation is removed, thus uncontrolled and intensive habitat clearance and degradation are serious threats." The species is "uncommon to rare in Cochabamba [and] locally frequent in Potosí". It occurs in one national park, but much of the park has been converted to pine plantations.
