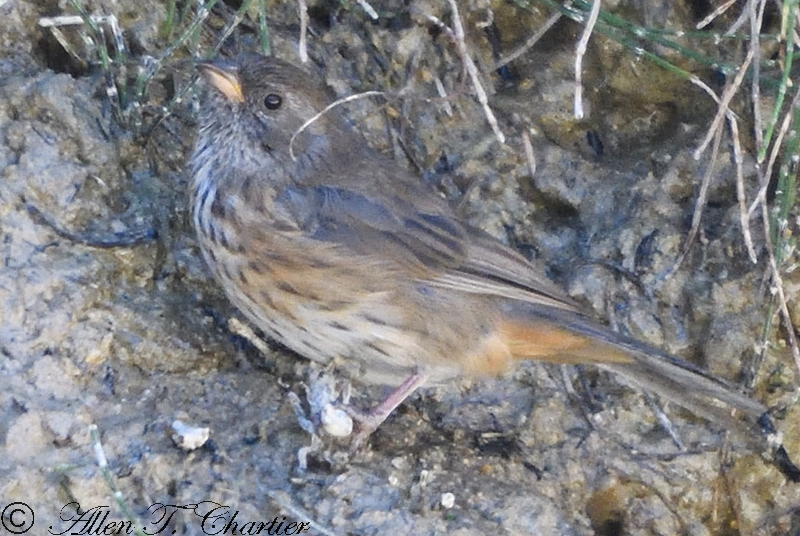
- Juvenile P. rubecula in Department of Lima, Peru

Conservation status
- Near Threatened (IUCN 3.1)

Scientific classification
- Kingdom: Animalia
- Phylum: Chordata
- Class: Aves
- Order: Passeriformes
- Family: Thraupidae
- Genus: Poospiza
- Species: P. rubecula

Binomial name
- Poospiza rubecula Salvin, 1895

= Rufous-breasted warbling finch =

Species of bird

The rufous-breasted warbling finch (Poospiza rubecula) is a species of bird in the family Thraupidae, the tanagers and allies. It is endemic to Peru.

== Taxonomy and systematics ==
The rufous-breasted warbling finch has a somewhat complicated taxonomic history. It was formally described in 1895 with its current binomial Poospiza rubecula. The genus Poospiza was in the family Fringillidae. By 1970 the genus had been reassigned to the family Emberizidae. Based on studies published between 1988 and 2011, beginning in 2012 Poospiza was moved to the tanager family Thraupidae.

The rufous-breasted warbling finch is monotypic.

== Description ==
The rufous-breasted warbling finch is 14 to 16.5 cm (5.5 to 6.5 in) long and weighs 21 to 26 g (0.74 to 0.92 oz). The sexes have the same plumage. Adults have a slaty gray crown and nape, a wide rufous supercilium that begins on the forecrown, and an otherwise black face. Their upperparts are slaty gray with a faint brownish tone. Their wings and tail are grayish brown. Their chin is black, their belly white, and the rest of their underparts rufous. They have a brown iris and grayish pink legs. Their maxilla is dark gray; their mandible's inner half is silver and outer half dark gray. Juveniles have a plain brownish gray head and upperparts with no supercilium or black. Their wings and tail are brown. Their breast is streaked with rufous, gray, and white and their belly is whitish.

== Distribution and habitat ==
The rufous-breasted warbling finch is found in northern Peru intermittently from southern Cajamarca Department south to east-central Lima Department. In the north it is in the valley of the Marañón River and further south along the Pacific slope of the Andes. It inhabits dry montane scrublands and woodlands and the edges of Polylepis woods. In elevation it ranges between 2,500 and 3,800 m (8,200 and 12,500 ft).

== Behavior ==
=== Movement ===
The rufous-breasted warbling finch is a year-round resident.

=== Feeding ===
The rufous-breasted warbling finch's diet has not been studied but is known to include seeds. It is thought to also feed on leaf buds and berries. It is usually seen singly but does forage in pairs and sometimes as a member of a mixed-species feeding flock.

=== Breeding ===
The rufous-breasted warbling finch's breeding season has not been defined but evidence suggests it spans from October to May. Nothing else is known about the species' breeding biology.

=== Vocalization ===
The rufous-breasted warbling finch's song is "a slightly accelerating, variable, rich, emphatic warble with a squeaky component, sometimes ending on a buzzy note".

== Status ==
The IUCN originally in 1988 assessed the rufous-breasted warbling finch as Threatened, then in 1994 as Endangered, and since 2024 as Near Threatened. It has a limited and fragmented range; its estimated population of between 2500 and 10,000 mature individuals is believed to be decreasing. "Humans have utilised upland areas in Peru for thousands of years, but agricultural intensification, the change from camelids to more destructive livestock (goats, sheep and cattle), and afforestation with exotic trees (e.g. Eucalyptus and Pinus) are relatively new and highly significant detrimental factors. Cutting of trees for timber is an additional cause of habitat degradation." The species is "nowhere common, even at known localities".
