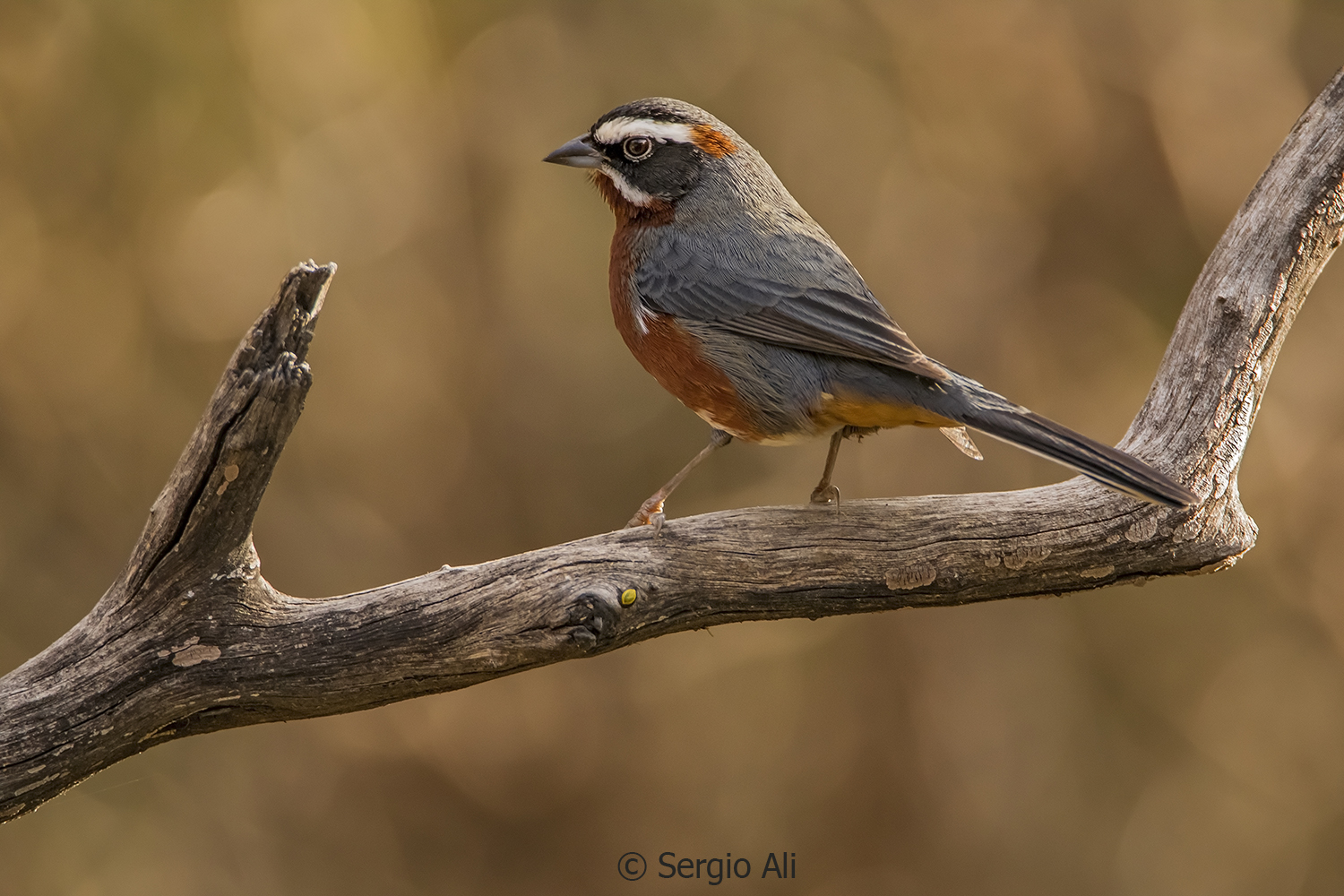

Conservation status
- Least Concern (IUCN 3.1)

Scientific classification
- Kingdom: Animalia
- Phylum: Chordata
- Class: Aves
- Order: Passeriformes
- Family: Thraupidae
- Genus: Poospiza
- Species: P. whitii

Binomial name
- Poospiza whitii Sclater, PL, 1883

Synonyms
- See text

= Black-and-chestnut warbling finch =

Species of bird

The black-and-chestnut warbling finch (Poospiza whitii) is a species of bird in the family Thraupidae, the tanagers and allies. It is found in Argentina and Bolivia.

== Taxonomy and systematics ==
The black-and-chestnut warbling finch has a complicated taxonomic history. It was formally described by the English zoologist Philip Sclater in 1883 under its current binomial Poospiza whitii in the family Emberizidae. The specific epithet honors Ernest William White, who had collected several specimens. The type locality is Cosquín, Córdoba in Argentina. In 1938 Hellmayr lumped this species into what is now the black-and-rufous warbling finch (P. nigrorufa) as Poospiza nigro-rufa whitii in the family Fringillidae. By 1970 the genus Poospiza had been returned to Emberizidae. Based on studies published between 1988 and 2011, beginning in 2012 Poospiza was moved to the tanager family Thraupidae. Based on studies published up to 2017, systems again recognized P. whitii as a species separate from P. nigrorufa.

For a time another taxon was treated as a subspecies, first called P. nigrorufa wagneri and then P. whitii wagneri. Major taxonomic systems have rejected it as not distinct from whitii and consider the black-and-chestnut warbling finch to be monotypic.

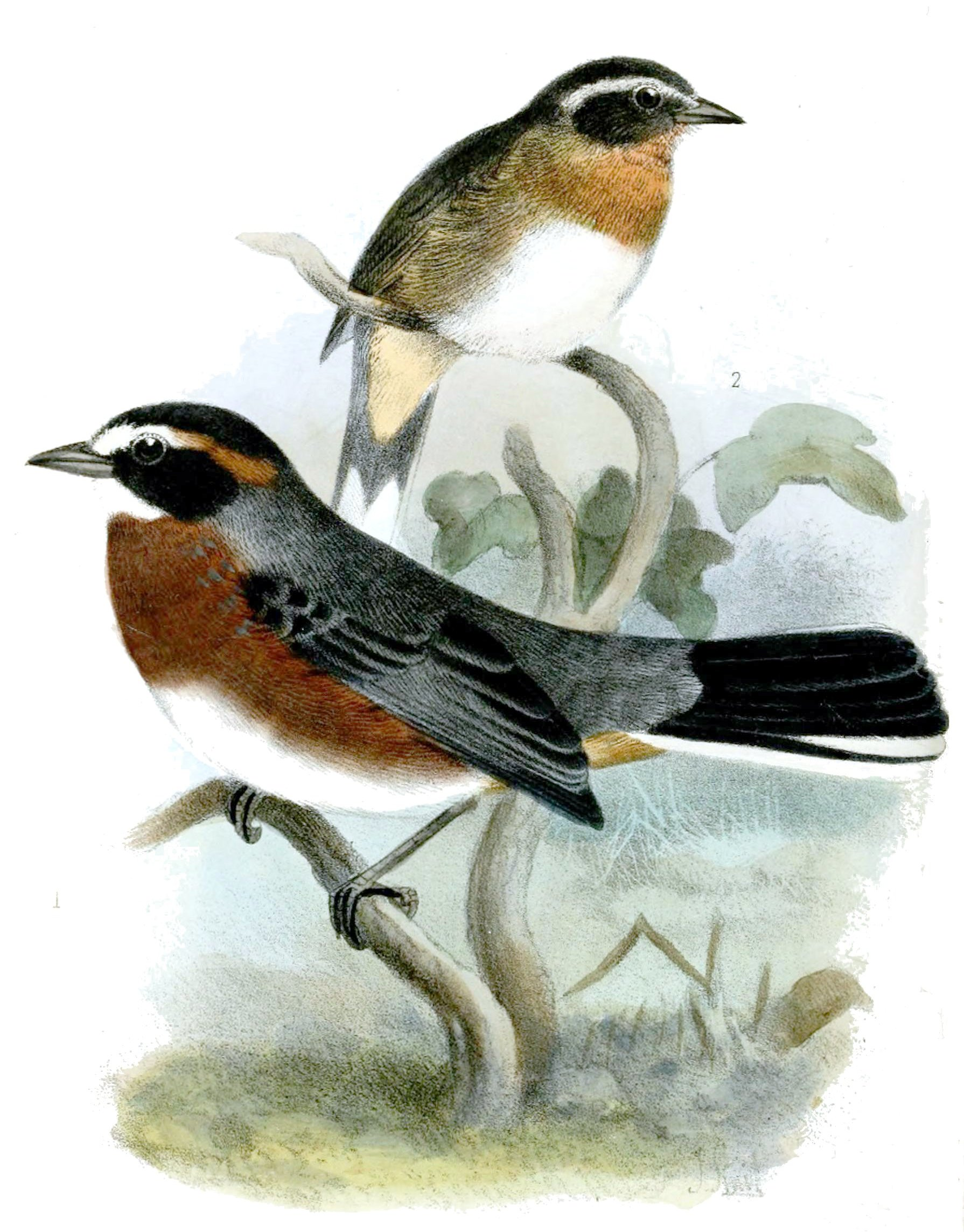
Illustration by Joseph Smit, 1883

== Description ==
The black-and-chestnut warbling finch is 12 to 14 cm (4.7 to 5.5 in) long and weighs 12 to 18.3 g (0.42 to 0.65 oz). The species is sexually dimorphic but not dramatically so. Adult males have a slate-gray crown and nape, a white supercilium that becomes chestnut behind the eye, and a white "moustache" on an otherwise black face. Their upperparts and wings are slate-gray and their tail blackish with large white tips on the outermost pairs of feathers and less on the next two pairs inward. Their chin is white, their throat, breast, and flanks deep chestnut, the center of their belly white, and their undertail coverts buff. Adult females have more olive-tinged upperparts and tawny-orange underparts than males. Juveniles have brownish gray upperparts, a yellow fore-supercilium, a white eye-ring, and pale ochre to cinnamon underparts with olivaceous flanks.

== Distribution and habitat ==
The black-and-chestnut warbling finch is found in the Andes from northwestern Bolivia's La Paz Department south into northwestern Argentina as far as San Luis and western Córdoba provinces. It inhabits arid to somewhat humid brushland and woodlands and also the edges of denser forest and shrubby areas in agricultural lands. In elevation it mostly ranges between 600 and 2,850 m (2,000 and 9,400 ft) but locally reaches 3,800 m (12,500 ft) in Bolivia and is more common between 200 and 900 m (700 and 3,000 ft) in the southern part of its range.

== Behavior ==
=== Movement ===
The black-and-chestnut warbling finch is primarily a year-round resident though some local movements have been noted in Bolivia and elevational ones in Argentina.

=== Feeding ===
The black-and-chestnut warbling finch's diet has not been studied. It forages on or near the ground, seldom more than 3 m (10 ft) above it. It often forages singly or in pairs but regularly joins mixed-species feeding flocks.

=== Breeding ===
The black-and-chestnut warbling finch's breeding season has not been fully defined but appears to span at least November to April. Its nest is a cup made from dry grasses and is typically in a shrub within about 1 m (3 ft) above the ground. The clutch is three or four eggs that are pale blue with dark spots. Nothing else is known about the species' breeding biology.

=== Vocalization ===
The black-and-chestnut warbling finch's song has been described as "thin, in short phrases seewee-psewt or cheeooee-tsew". Males sing from a high perch.

== Status ==
The IUCN has assessed the black-and-chestnut warbling finch as being of Least Concern. It has a large range; its population size is not known but is believed to be stable. No immediate threats have been identified. It is "fairly common" in most of is range but "patchy and uncommon" in the north.
