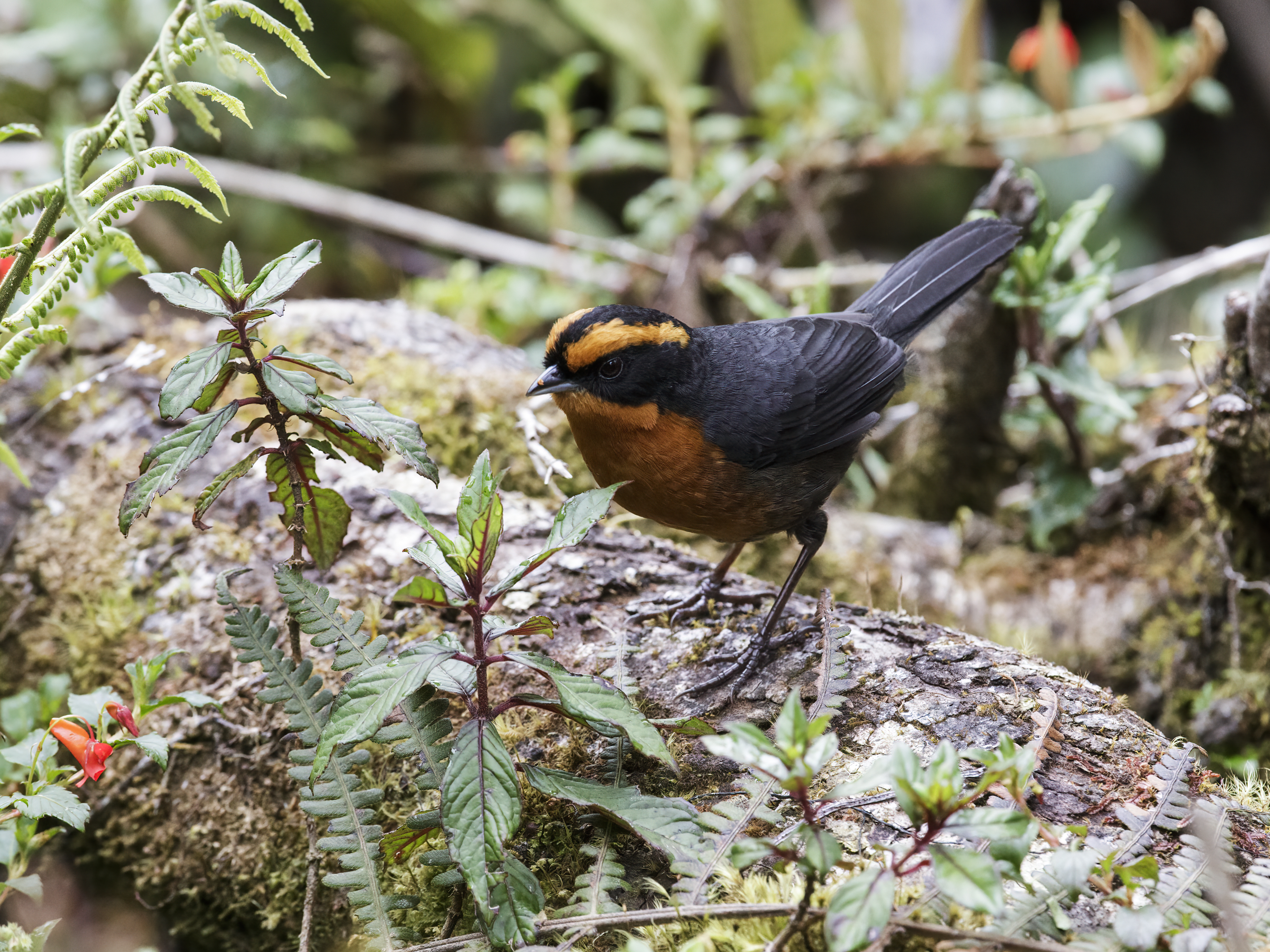

Conservation status
- Least Concern (IUCN 3.1)

Scientific classification
- Kingdom: Animalia
- Phylum: Chordata
- Class: Aves
- Order: Passeriformes
- Family: Thraupidae
- Genus: Poospiza
- Species: P. rufosuperciliaris

Binomial name
- Poospiza rufosuperciliaris (Blake & Hocking, 1974)

= Rufous-browed hemispingus =

Species of bird

The rufous-browed hemispingus (Poospiza rufosuperciliaris) is a species of bird in the family Thraupidae, the tanagers and allies. It is endemic to Peru.

== Taxonomy and systematics ==
The rufous-browed hemispingus was formally described in 1974 with the binomial Hemispingus rufosuperciliaris. Based largely on a 2016 publication, taxonomic systems transferred Hemispingus rufosuperciliaris to its present genus Poospiza.

== Description ==
The rufous-browed hemispingus is 15 to 16 cm (5.9 to 6.3 in) long and weighs 26 to 33 g (0.92 to 1.2 oz). The sexes have the same plumage. Adults have a mostly black head with a very wide cinnamon-rufous supercilium that extends to the nape. Their upperparts are dark slate and their tail an even darker slate. Their flight feathers are like the tail and the wing coverts are a paler gray. Their throat, breast, sides, and upper belly are cinnamon-rufous. Their lower belly, flanks, and undertail coverts are dark gray with a slight brown tinge. They have a brown iris, a black maxilla, a blue-gray mandible, and brown legs.

== Distribution and habitat ==
The rufous-browed hemispingus is found intermittently on the eastern slope of the Peruvian Andes from central Amazonas state south to southern Huánuco Department. It inhabits elfin forest and humid montane forest and especially favors patches of Chusquea bamboo. In elevation it ranges from 2,250 to 3,500 m (7,400 to 11,500 ft).

== Behavior ==
=== Movement ===
The rufous-browed hemispingus is a year-round resident.

=== Feeding ===
The rufous-browed hemispingus' diet has not been studied but is known to include insects, seeds, and berries. It forages from the ground up to about 2 m (7 ft) above it, flicking its tail while hopping along limbs or on the ground. It typically is seen singly, in pairs, and in small groups thought to be families, and also often joins mixed-species feeding flocks.

=== Breeding ===
Nothing is known about the rufous-browed hemispingus' breeding biology.

=== Vocalization ===
The rufous-browed hemispingus' song is "a loud series of jerky, wiry squeaks and chips" and its call "a dry tik or tsip". Its song has been written as "nay-tit-tit-tit-squeal! tit-tit-squeal!, nya-nya tit-squeal! etc.".

== Status ==
The IUCN originally in 1994 assessed the rufous-browed hemispingus as Near Threatened, then in 2000 as Vulnerable, and since 2019 as being of Least Concern. It has a restricted range; its estimated population is 1500 to 7000 mature individuals but its trend is unknown. "Regular burning of páramo grassland, adjacent to elfin forest, to promote the growth of fresh shoots for livestock, has lowered the treeline by several hundred metres, and continues to destroy large areas of this species's habitat. The human population density in large areas of the species's range is low, indicating that some of its populations may be relatively secure at present, however, there is a marked increase in number of cattle in northern Peru." It is considered "rare and local". It is know from a few separate areas, but because much of its range is difficult to access it "probably is more continuously distributed within its range than currently is documented".
