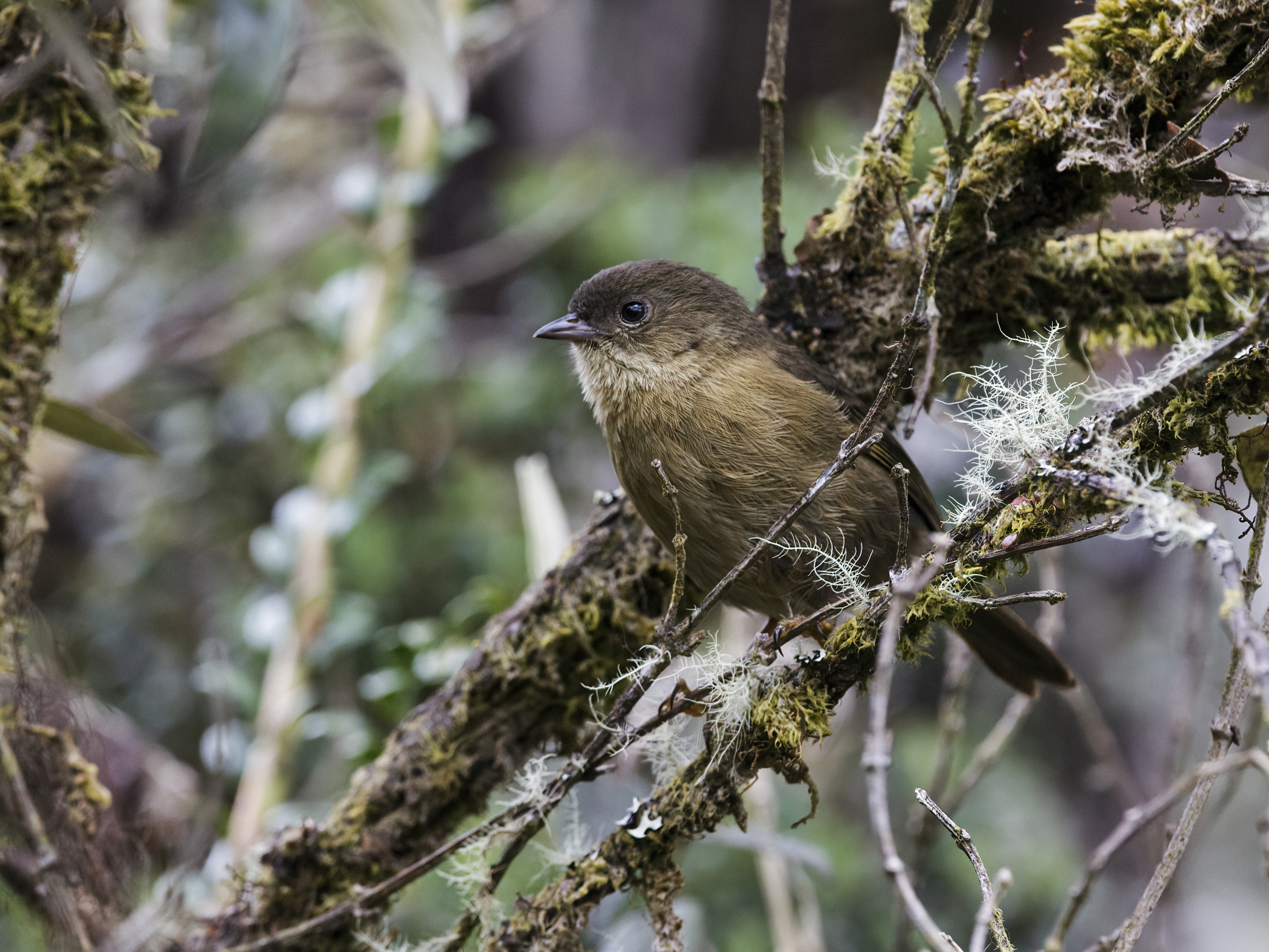

Conservation status
- Least Concern (IUCN 3.1)

Scientific classification
- Kingdom: Animalia
- Phylum: Chordata
- Class: Aves
- Order: Passeriformes
- Family: Thraupidae
- Genus: Nephelornis; Lowery & Tallman, 1976
- Species: N. oneilli

Binomial name
- Nephelornis oneilli Lowery & Tallman, 1976

= Pardusco =

Genus of birds

The pardusco (Nephelornis oneilli) is a species of tanager that is endemic to woodland near the timberline in the Andes of central Peru. It is the only member of the genus Nephelornis. This small olive-brown bird is typically seen in groups, which sometimes join mixed species flocks. It has a small range, but is locally fairly common, and consequently considered to be of least concern by BirdLife International and IUCN.

== Taxonomy ==
The pardusco was formally described in 1976 by the American ornithologists George Lowery and Dan Tallman from specimens collected in the Department of Huánuco of central Peru. They introduced the monospecific genus Nephelornis creating the binomial name Nephelornis oneilli. The genus name combines the Ancient Greek nephelē meaning "cloud" with ornis meaning "bird". The specific epithet was chosen to honour the ornithologist John Patton O'Neill. A 2014 molecular phylogenetic study of the tanager family Thraupidae found that the pardusco is a member of the subfamily Poospizinae and has a sister relationship to the black-backed bush tanager in the monospecific genus Urothraupis. The pardusco is monotypic: no subspecies are recognised.
