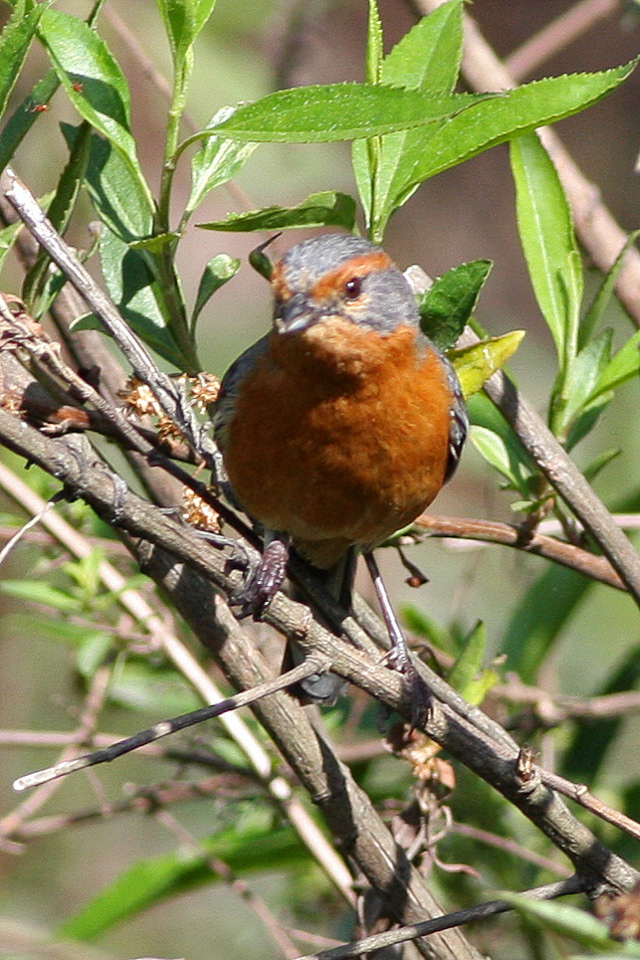

Conservation status
- Least Concern (IUCN 3.1)

Scientific classification
- Kingdom: Animalia
- Phylum: Chordata
- Class: Aves
- Order: Passeriformes
- Family: Thraupidae
- Genus: Microspingus
- Species: M. erythrophrys

Binomial name
- Microspingus erythrophrys (Sclater, PL, 1881)

= Rusty-browed warbling finch =

Species of bird

The rusty-browed warbling finch (Microspingus erythrophrys) is a species of bird in the family Thraupidae. It is found in Argentina and Bolivia. Its natural habitat is subtropical or tropical moist montane forests.
