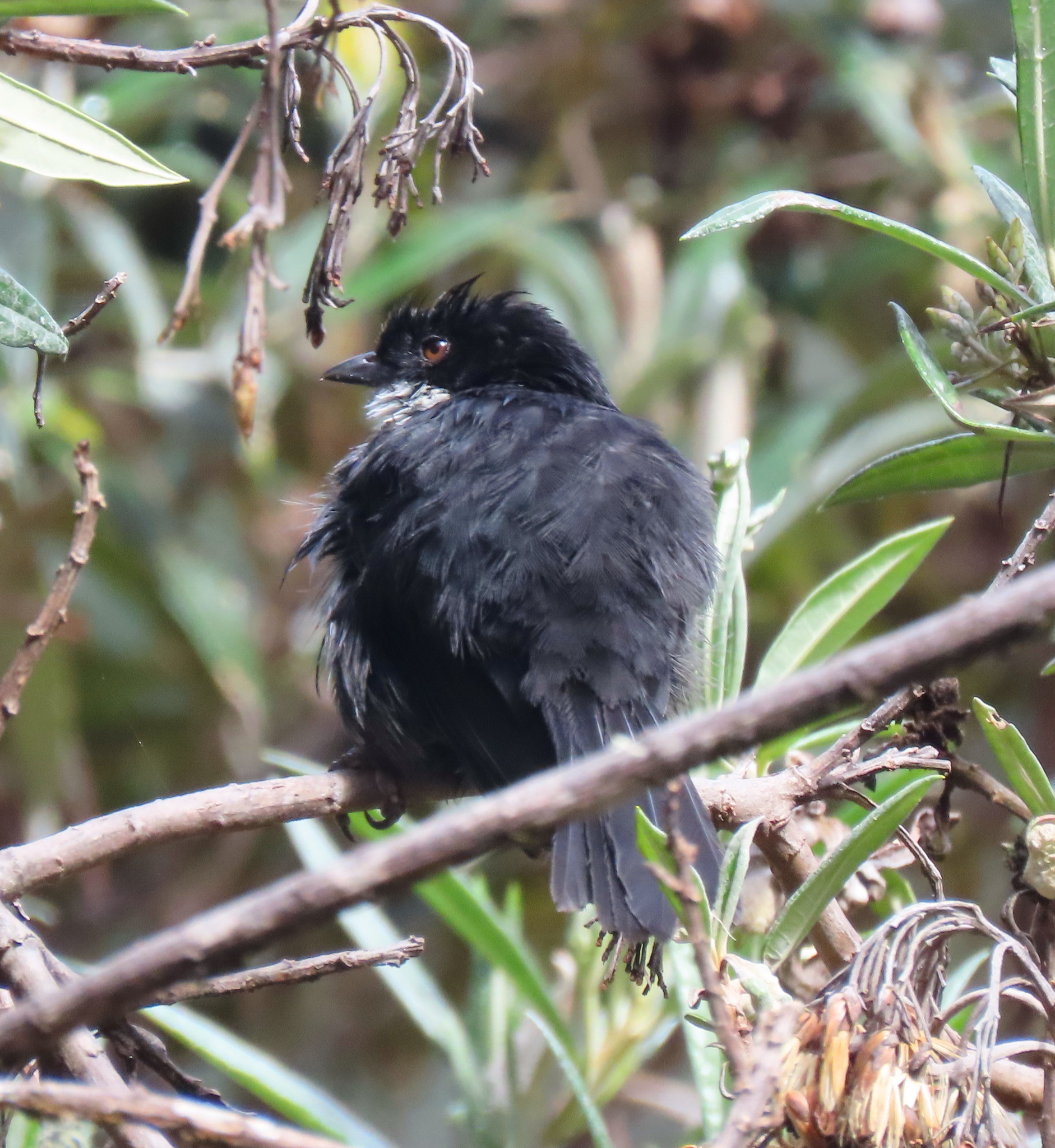
- A Black-backed Bush Tanager in Ecuador on 23 January 2020

Conservation status
- Least Concern (IUCN 3.1)

Scientific classification
- Kingdom: Animalia
- Phylum: Chordata
- Class: Aves
- Order: Passeriformes
- Family: Thraupidae
- Genus: Urothraupis; Taczanowski & Berlepsch, 1885
- Species: U. stolzmanni

Binomial name
- Urothraupis stolzmanni Taczanowski & Berlepsch, 1885

= Black-backed bush tanager =

Species of bird

The black-backed bush tanager (Urothraupis stolzmanni), also known as the black-backed bush-finch, is a species of bird in the family Thraupidae. It is the only member in the genus Urothraupis. It is found in Colombia and Ecuador. Its natural habitat is subtropical or tropical moist montane forests.

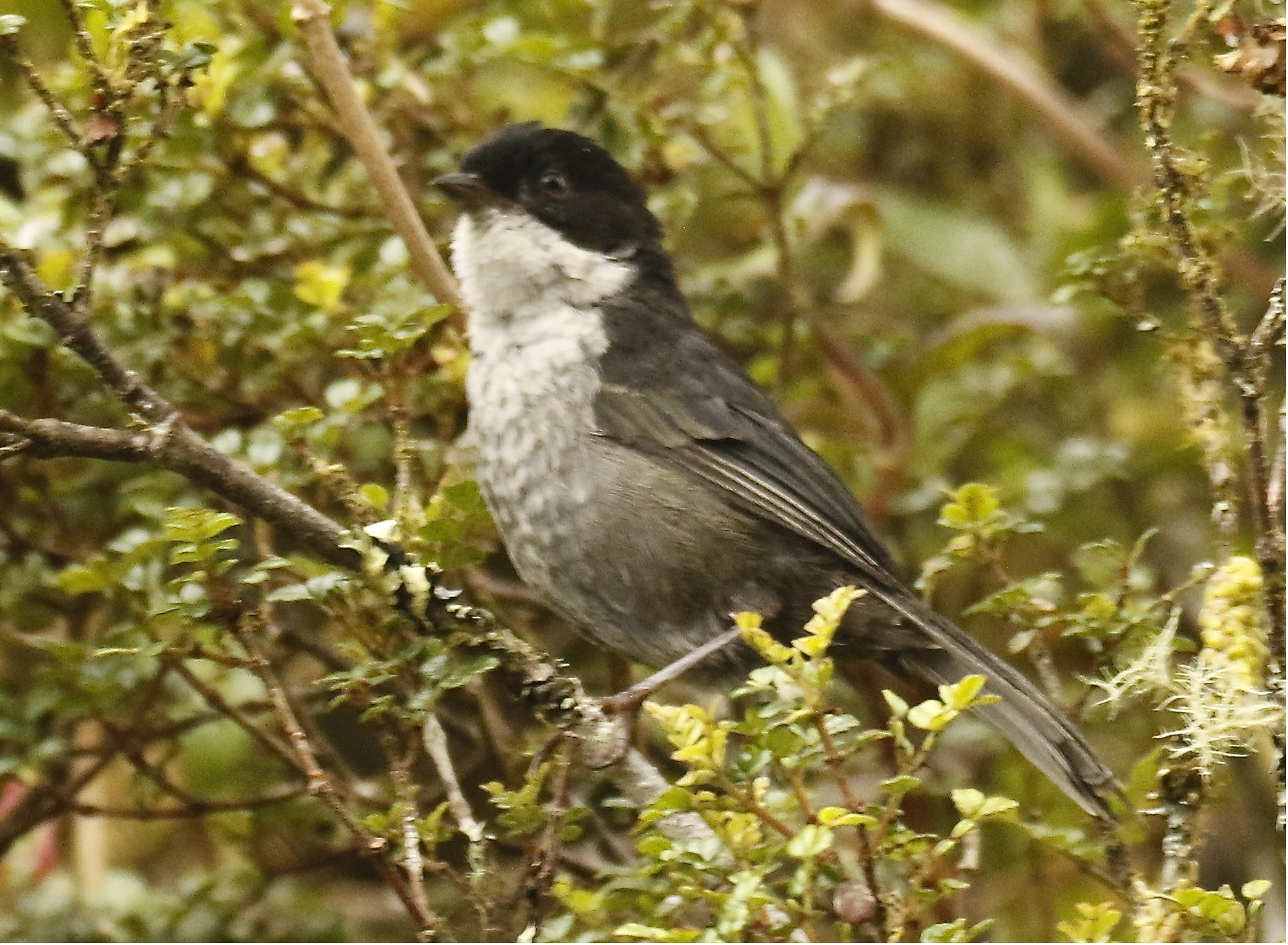
Papallacta Pass – Ecuador

== Taxonomy ==
The black-backed bush tanager was formally described in 1885 by Władysław Taczanowski and Hans von Berlepsch from specimens collected by the Polish zoologist Jan Sztolcman (sometimes written Jean Stolzmann) on the eastern slopes of the Tungurahua Volcano in central Ecuador. The ornithologists introduced the monospecific genus Urothraupis and coined the binomial name Urothraupis stolzmanni. The genus name combines the Ancient Greek oura meaning "tail" with thraupis, an unidentified small bird, used by ornithologist for tanagers. The specific epithet honors the collector Sztolcman/Stolzmann. A 2014 molecular phylogenetic study of the tanager family Thraupidae found that the black-backed bush tanager is a member of the subfamily Poospizinae and has a sister relationship to the pardusco in the monospecific genus Nephelornis. The black-backed bush tanager is monotypic: no subspecies are recognised.
