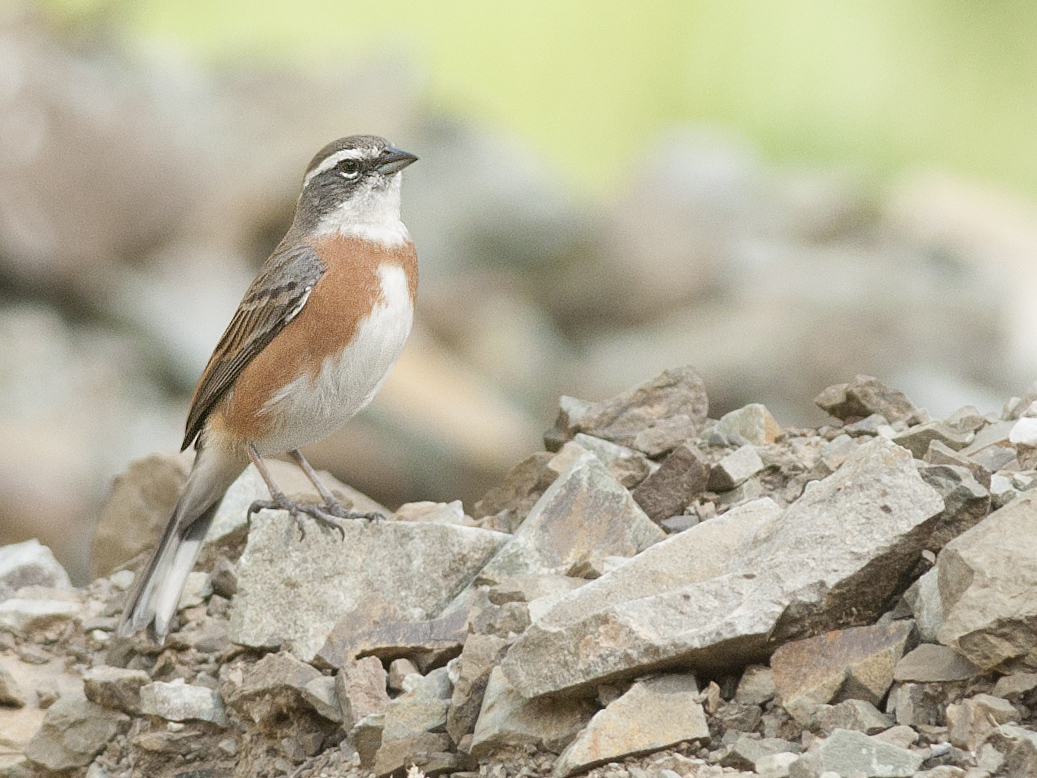

Conservation status
- Least Concern (IUCN 3.1)

Scientific classification
- Kingdom: Animalia
- Phylum: Chordata
- Class: Aves
- Order: Passeriformes
- Family: Thraupidae
- Genus: Poospiza
- Species: P. boliviana

Binomial name
- Poospiza boliviana Sharpe, 1888

= Bolivian warbling finch =

Bolivian Warbling-finch

Species of bird

The Bolivian warbling finch (Poospiza boliviana) is a species of bird in the family Thraupidae, the tanagers and allies. It is found in Argentina and Bolivia.

== Taxonomy and systematics ==
The Bolivian warbling finch has a somewhat complicated taxonomic history. It was formally described in 1888 with its current binomial Poospiza boliviana. At the time, genus Poospiza was in the family Fringillidae. By 1970 the genus had been reassigned to the family Emberizidae. Based on studies published between 1988 and 2011, beginning in 2012 Poospiza was moved to the tanager family Thraupidae.

The Bolivian warbling finch is monotypic.

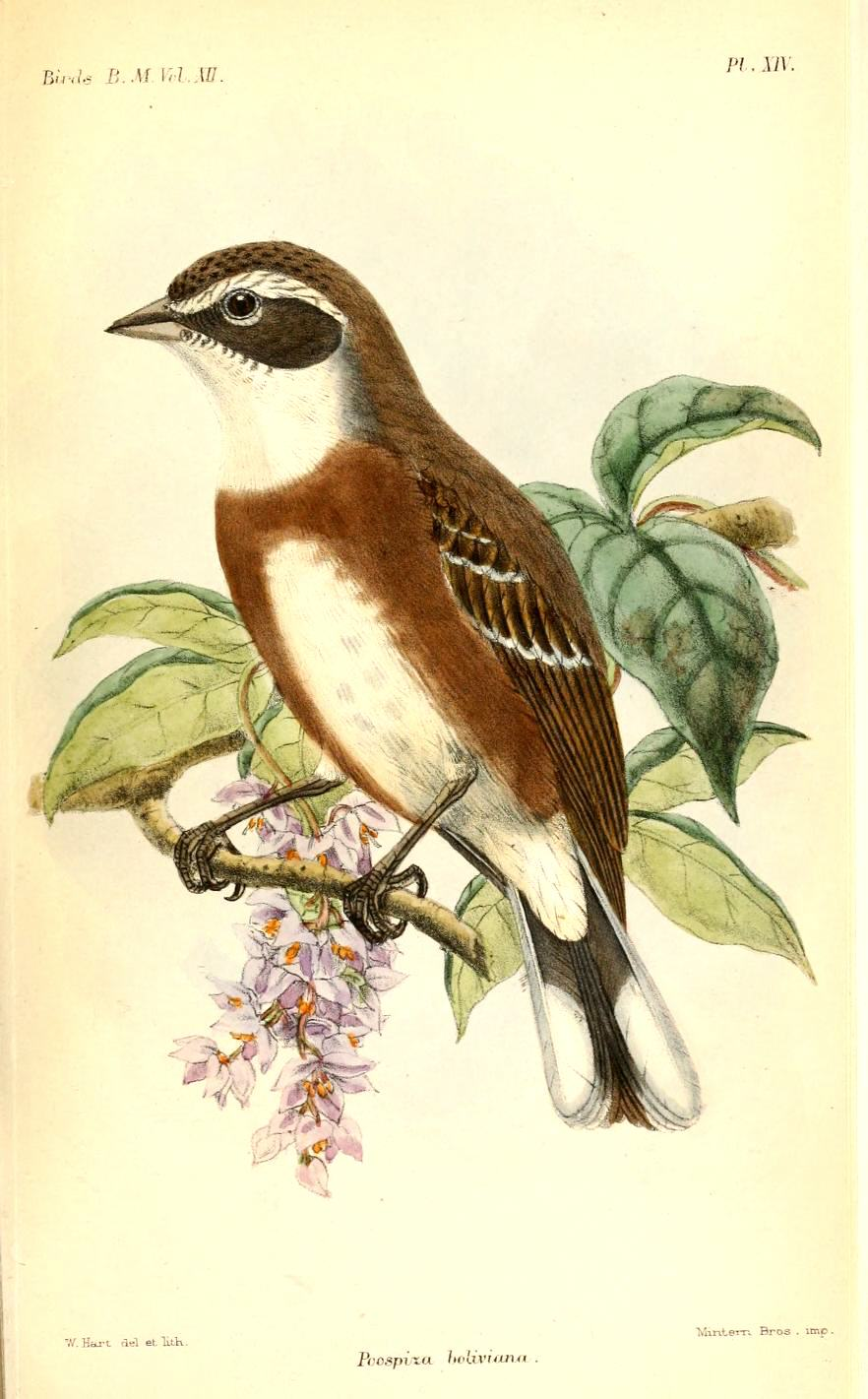
Illustration by William Matthew Hart, 1888

== Description ==
The Bolivian warbling finch is 15 to 16 cm (5.9 to 6.3 in) long. Adults have a grayish crown and a long white supercilium on an otherwise dark gray face. Their upperparts are grayish brown and their tail dusky with wide white tips on the outermost pair of feathers. Their wings are mostly grayish brown with rufous edges on the secondaries. Their throat is white, their breast and flanks chestnut, their belly and vent white, and their crissum buffy white. They have a dark brown iris, a small, pointed, dark gray bill with a black tip and culmen, and blackish legs. Juveniles are paler and duller than adults with a buff tinge on the supercilium and faint streaks on the underparts.

== Distribution and habitat ==
The Bolivian warbling finch is found in the Andes from eastern La Paz Department in Bolivia south through Cochabamba, western Santa Cruz, western Chuquisaca, and western Tarija departments slightly into northwestern Argentina's Salta Province. It primarily inhabits dry to somewhat humid scrublands, open woodlands, shrubby hillsides, and thickets along watercourses. In elevation it ranges from 1,600 to 3,100 m (5,200 to 10,200 ft).

== Behavior ==
=== Movement ===
The Bolivian warbling finch is a sedentary year-round resident.

=== Feeding ===
The Bolivian warbling finch's diet has not been studied but appears to be arthropods and seeds. It forages on the ground and in dense vegetation. It usually is found singly and in pairs which often flock with other species.

=== Breeding ===
The Bolivian warbling finch's breeding season includes March and April but nothing else is known about the species' breeding biology.

=== Vocalization ===
The Bolivian warbling finch's song has apparently not been described. Its call is "a sharp twiip".

== Status ==
The IUCN has assessed the Bolivian warbling finch as being of Least Concern. It has a large range; its population size is not known and is believed to be decreasing. No immediate threats have been identified. It is considered rare to uncommon overall, but does occur in three protected areas in Bolivia. Its first record in Argentina was reported in 2001.
