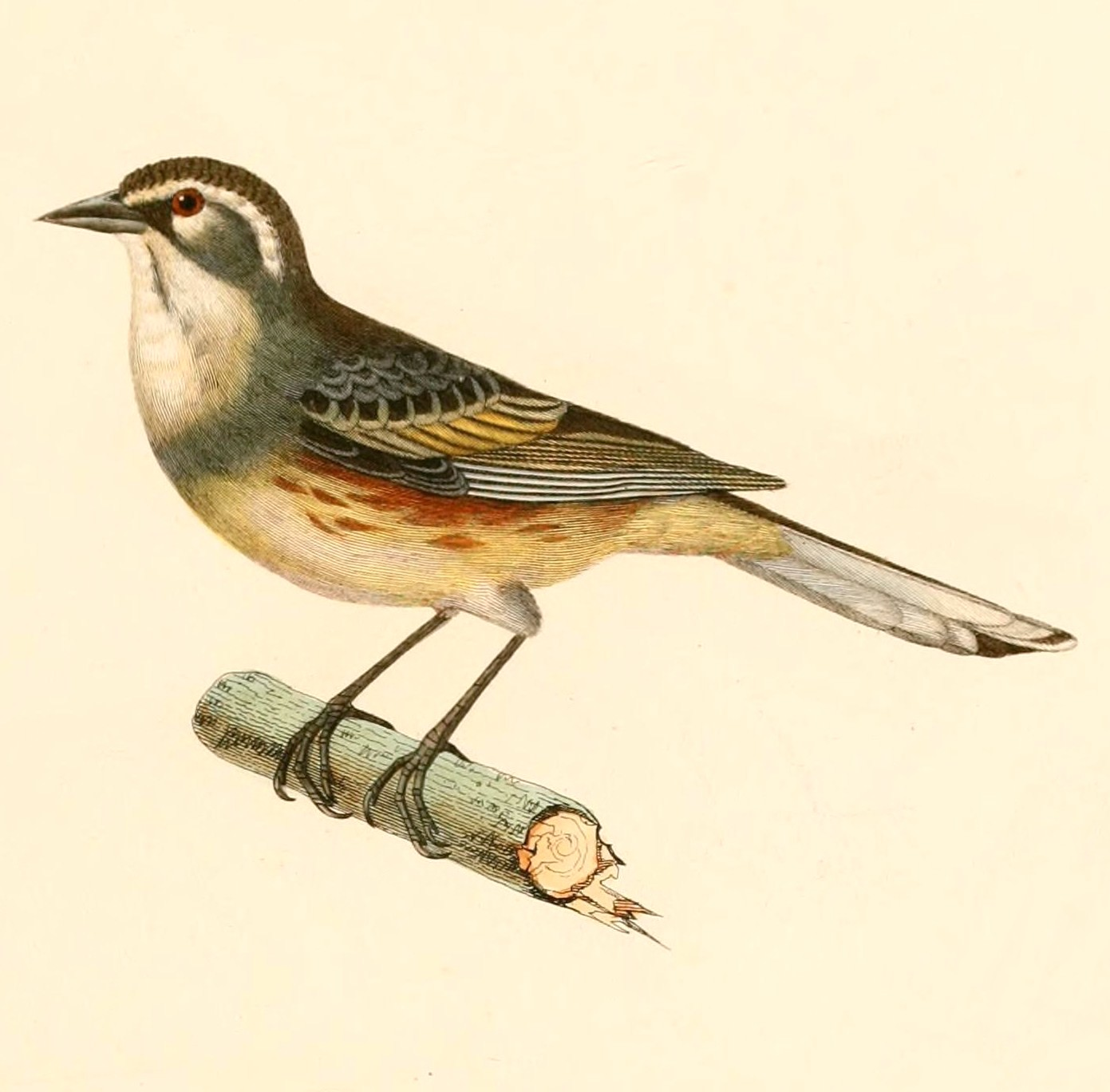

Conservation status
- Least Concern (IUCN 3.1)

Scientific classification
- Kingdom: Animalia
- Phylum: Chordata
- Class: Aves
- Order: Passeriformes
- Family: Thraupidae
- Genus: Poospizopsis
- Species: P. hypocondria

Binomial name
- Poospizopsis hypocondria (d'Orbigny & Lafresnaye, 1837)

Synonyms
- Poospiza hypocondria

= Rufous-sided warbling finch =

Species of bird

The rufous-sided warbling finch (Poospizopsis hypocondria) is a species of bird in the family Thraupidae. It is found in the Andes of Bolivia and northern Argentina as well as the Sierras de Córdoba.

Its natural habitat is subtropical or tropical high-altitude shrubland.

== Gallery ==
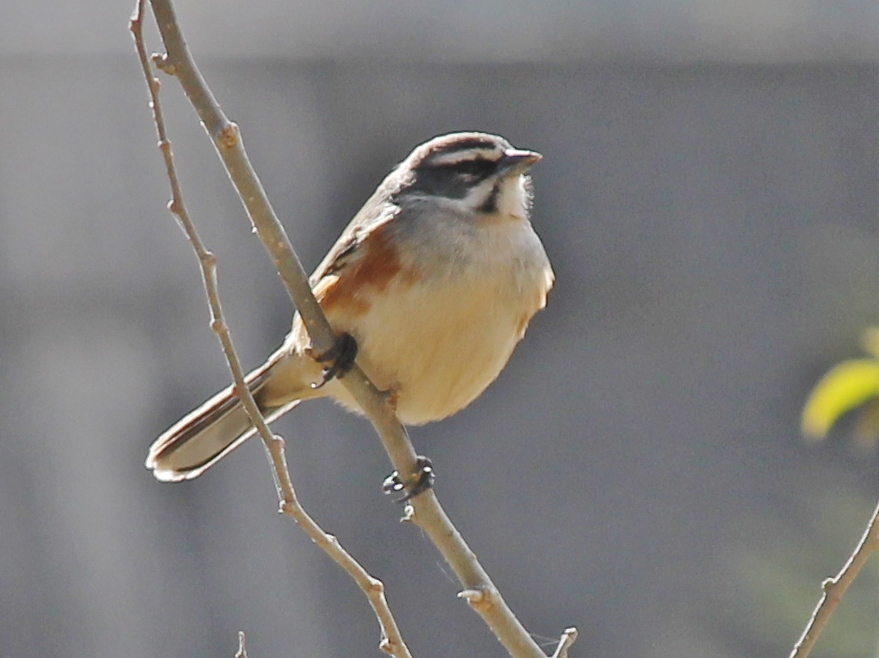
Rufous-sided warbling-finch
