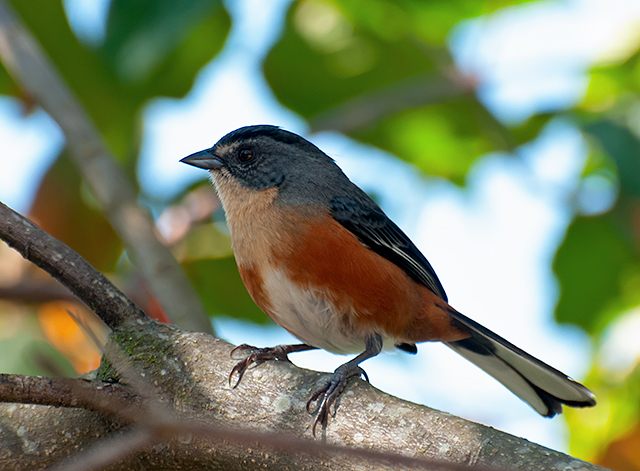
- In Minas Gerais, Brazil

Conservation status
- Least Concern (IUCN 3.1)

Scientific classification
- Kingdom: Animalia
- Phylum: Chordata
- Class: Aves
- Order: Passeriformes
- Family: Thraupidae
- Genus: Microspingus
- Species: M. lateralis

Binomial name
- Microspingus lateralis (Nordmann, 1835)

= Buff-throated warbling finch =

Species of bird

The buff-throated warbling finch (Microspingus lateralis) is a species of bird in the family Thraupidae. It is found in forest borders and woodland in south-eastern Brazil. It was previously considered conspecific with the gray-throated warbling finch, and together they were known as the red-rumped warbling finch. The SACC found enough evidence to split them in 2009.
