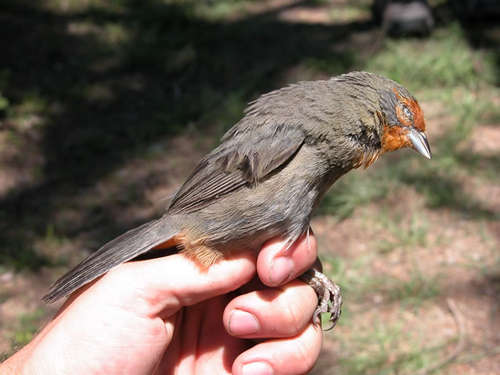
- Specimen

Conservation status
- Least Concern (IUCN 3.1)

Scientific classification
- Kingdom: Animalia
- Phylum: Chordata
- Class: Aves
- Order: Passeriformes
- Family: Thraupidae
- Genus: Poospiza
- Species: P. baeri

Binomial name
- Poospiza baeri (Oustalet, 1904)

Audio
- Two adult Tucuman mountain finches vocalizing

= Tucumán mountain finch =

Tucuman mountain finch

Species of bird

The Tucuman mountain finch (Note: The IOC and other taxonomic systems spell the English name with no diacritics. The IOC is the Wikipedia standard for bird names.) (Poospiza baeri) is a species of bird in the family Thraupidae, the tanagers and allies. It is found in Argentina and possibly Bolivia.

== Taxonomy and systematics ==
The Tucuman mountain finch has a complicated taxonomic history. It was formally described in 1904 with the binomial Buarremon baeri in the family Fringillidae. In 1938 Hellmayr reassigned it to the genus Compospiza, still in Fringillidae. In 1970 Paynter merged Compospiza into Poospiza in the family Emberizidae. Between 2008 and the mid-2010s some taxonomic systems returned it to Compospiza and after that interval back to its present genus Poospiza. During the interval, beginning in 2012 both Compospiza and Poospiza were moved to the tanager family Thraupidae.

The Tucuman mountain finch is monotypic.

== Description ==
The Tucuman mountain finch is 16.5 to 18 cm (6.5 to 7.1 in) long and weighs 31.5 to 34.5 g (1.1 to 1.2 oz). It is rather stocky and heavy and has a long tail. The sexes have almost the same plumage. Adult males have a wide orange-rufous forehead that extends as a supercilium past the eye, an orange-rufous crescent under the eye, and an otherwise gray head. Their upperparts, tail, and wings are gray. Their throat and upper breast are orange-rufous, their lower breast, flanks and upper belly gray, their lower belly and vent very pale gray, and their crissum orange-rufous. They have a brown to dark reddish brown iris and grayish legs. Their maxilla is blackish and their mandible a paler blue-gray. Adult females have less rufous on their throat and breast than males but are otherwise the same. Juveniles have gray-brown upperparts and dark-streaked pale brown underparts.

== Distribution and habitat ==
The Tucuman mountain finch is found in northwestern Argentina intermittently from Jujuy Province south to northeastern La Rioja Province. It inhabits Puna grassland, nearby shrubby woodlands, streamside vegetation, and sometimes gardens. One source gives an elevational range of between 2,000 and 3,000 m (6,600 and 9,800 ft). Another gives it as 2,500 to 3,100 m (8,200 to 10,200 ft) with some individuals in the southern part of its range moving as low as 1,200 m (3,900 ft) in winter. One source also places the species in extreme southern Bolivia but the South American Classification Committee has only unconfirmed reports there.

== Behavior ==
=== Movement ===
The Tucuman mountain finch is essentially a year-round resident though some individuals move to lower elevations in winter.

=== Feeding ===
The Tucuman mountain finch's diet has not been studied but is known to include insects and is assumed to also include seeds. It forages on the ground and near it in low shrubbery. It usually is in pairs and in the non-breeding season joins mixed-species feeding flocks.

=== Breeding ===
The Tucuman mountain finch's breeding season spans at least December to March. Its nest is typically in dense a tussock grass. The clutch is two or three eggs that are white with dark spots. Nothing else is known about the species' breeding biology.

=== Vocalization ===
The Tucuman mountain finch's song is "a series of short whistles, differing slightly in frequency, swit-jeet-siit-swop-sweet-swit...". Its contact call is "a high sip note" and what is probably an alarm call is "a sharper repeated tip-tip...tip...tip-tip".

== Status ==
The IUCN originally in 1988 assessed the Tucuman mountain finch as Threatened, then in 1994 as Vulnerable, and since 2024 as being of Least Concern. It estimated population is between 2500 and 10,000 mature individuals but its trend is not known. It has 10 to 20 subpopulations within its range. "Human settlement in the region has brought goats and cattle, which have destroyed habitat in some ravines, though it is not clear if this affects the population. Fires in adjacent grasslands could spread into ravines. Potato and strawberry plantations are expanding to areas increasingly close to its known distribution." It is considered "generally uncommon" but does occur in a few protected areas.
