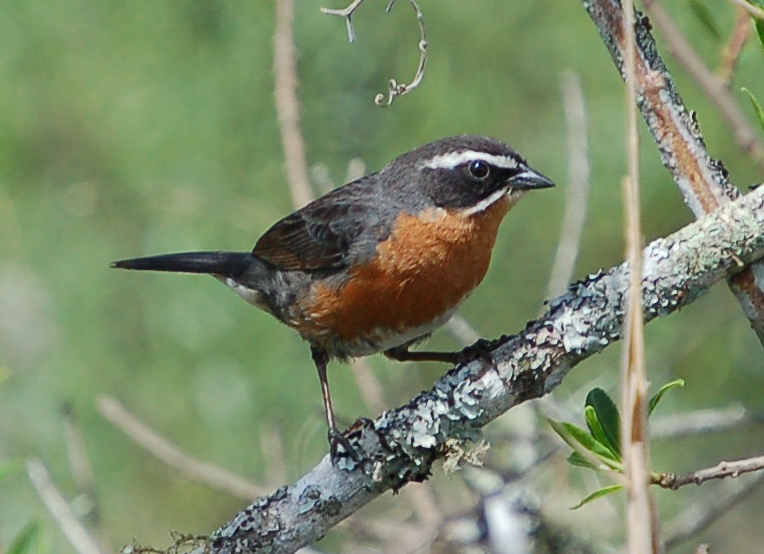
- Black-and-rufous warbling finch (Poospiza nigrorufa)

Scientific classification
- Kingdom: Animalia
- Phylum: Chordata
- Class: Aves
- Order: Passeriformes
- Family: Thraupidae
- Genus: Poospiza; Cabanis, 1847

Type species
- Emberiza nigrorufa D'Orbigny & Lafresnaye, 1837

Species
- See text

= Poospiza =

Genus of birds

Poospiza is a genus of finch-like birds in the tanager family Thraupidae that are found in both the South American lowlands and the Andes mountains. Generally they are arboreal feeders in light woodland and scrub. All have extensive grey to their plumage, and have—often bold—white or rufous markings.

== Taxonomy and species list ==
The genus Poospiza was introduced in 1847 by the German ornithologist Jean Cabanis. The name combines the Ancient Greek poa meaning "grass" and spiza meaning "finch". The type species was designated as the black-and-rufous warbling finch by the English zoologist George Robert Gray in 1855.

A molecular phylogenetic study of the Tanager family published in 2014 found that Poospiza and many other genera were polyphyletic. In the subsequent reorganization two species from Compsospiza and two species from Hemispingus were moved here. At the same time several species formerly assigned to Poospiza were moved to Microspingus, Poospizopsis and Castanozoster.

The genus contains the following ten species:

Image	Common name	Scientific name	Distribution
	Bolivian warbling finch	Poospiza boliviana	Argentina and Bolivia
	Cinnamon warbling finch	Poospiza ornata	Argentina.
	Black-and-rufous warbling finch	Poospiza nigrorufa	Argentina, Bolivia, Brazil, Paraguay, and Uruguay.
	Black-and-chestnut warbling finch	Poospiza whitii	western Argentina and western Bolivia.
	Collared warbling finch	Poospiza hispaniolensis	Ecuador and Peru.
	Rufous-breasted warbling finch	Poospiza rubecula	Peru.
	Tucumán mountain finch	Poospiza baeri	western Argentina
	Cochabamba mountain finch	Poospiza garleppi	Bolivia.
	Slaty-backed hemispingus	Poospiza goeringi	Venezuela.
	Rufous-browed hemispingus	Poospiza rufosuperciliaris	Peru.

== Sources ==
- Ridgely, R. S., & G. Tudor. 1989. The Birds of South America, vol. 1. Univ. Texas Press, Austin.
