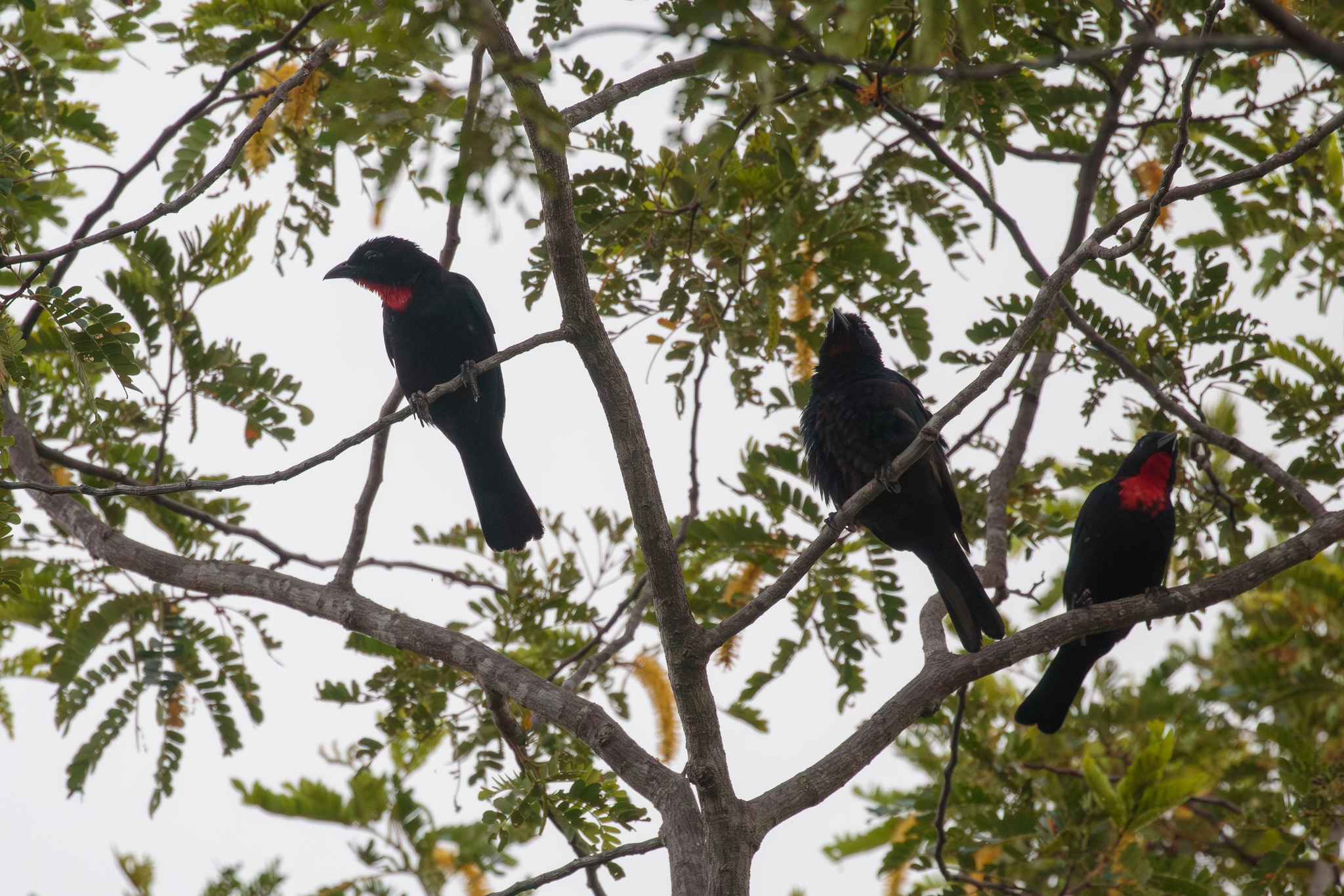

Conservation status
- Least Concern (IUCN 3.1)

Scientific classification
- Kingdom: Animalia
- Phylum: Chordata
- Class: Aves
- Order: Passeriformes
- Family: Thraupidae
- Genus: Compsothraupis; Richmond, 1915
- Species: C. loricata

Binomial name
- Compsothraupis loricata (Lichtenstein, 1819)

Synonyms
- Tanagra loricata (protonym)

Audio
- Song recorded in Pernambuco, Brazil

= Scarlet-throated tanager =

Species of bird

The scarlet-throated tanager (Compsothraupis loricata) is a species of bird in the family Thraupidae, the tanagers and allies. It is endemic to Brazil.

== Taxonomy and systematics ==
The scarlet-throated tanager was formally described in 1819 by the German naturalist Hinrich Lichtenstein with the binomial Tanagra loricata. Lichtenstein based his description on the Jacapú that had been described in 1648 by Georg Marcgrave. The type locality is northeastern Brazil.

The scarlet-throated tanager is now the only member of the genus Compsothraupis that was introduced in 1915 by the American ornithologist Charles Wallace Richmond. The genus name is formed from the Ancient Greek kompsos meaning "pretty" with thraupis, an unknown small bird. In ornithology thraupis is used to signify a tanager. The specific epithet loricata is from the Latin loricatus meaning "clothed in mail" or "breast-plated". Some mid-twentieth century authors merged Compsothraupis into the genus Sericossypha, which is now occupied solely by the white-capped tanager (S. albocristata). Due to the species' nesting and flocking behavior it has also been suggested to better belong to another family, with the New World blackbirds Icteridae a candidate.

The scarlet-throated tanager is monotypic.

== Description ==
The scarlet-throated tanager is a large tanager that resembles a blackbird. It is 20 to 21 cm (7.9 to 8.3 in) long; one male weighed 72.5 g (2.6 oz). The species is sexually dimorphic. Adult males are almost entirely glossy blue-black. Their throat and the center of their breast are scarlet and the bases of their back and flank feathers are white, though this color is not visible in the field. Adult females are entirely black. Both sexes have a dark brown iris, a stout black bill, and dusky gray legs and feet.

== Distribution and habitat ==
The scarlet-throated tanager is found in eastern Brazil east of a line that roughly traces from the Atlantic in Maranhão south to eastern Tocantins, then west to far eastern Mato Grosso, south to west-central Goiás, southeast to north-central Minas Gerais, and northeast back to the Atlantic in northeastern Bahia. It is primarily a bird of the Caatinga, a somewhat dry and generally semi-open biome. Within it the species favors areas such as gallery forest and lands near marshes and lagoons. In elevation it ranges from near sea level to 700 m (2,300 ft).

== Behavior ==
=== Movement ===
The scarlet-throated tanager is a year-round resident.

=== Feeding ===
The scarlet-throated tanager's diet has not been studied but is known to be mostly insects. It typically forages in small flocks of six to eight individuals and sometimes associates with blackbirds. It is "rather slow-moving and sometimes unwary". It is sometimes observed perched on a high exposed branch for long periods.

=== Breeding ===
Male scarlet-throated tanagers make a courtship display in which they fluff their back feathers to expose their white bases. The species has been found to nest in an old woodpecker hole, in the crown of palm tree, and in an abandoned nest of a Caatinga cachalote (Pseudoseisura cristata). Nothing else is known about the species' breeding biology.

=== Vocalization ===
A scarlet-throated tanager vocalization that could be either song or call is a "slow, unstructured series of harsh tchaw notes, given by [the] group". Another vocalization, identified as a call, is "a loud icterid-like chirt or kyuh, often repeated over and over". Its dawn song is "essentially a more ringing version of this same note, a single penetrating kyeh or kyuh repeated at intervals of c. 1 second".

== Status ==
The IUCN has assessed the scarlet-throated tanager as being of Least Concern. Its population size is not known but is believed to be stable. No immediate threats have been identified. It is considered "uncommon to rare" in approximately the southwestern third of its range and "frequent to uncommon" in the rest. "Extensive deforestation continues within the rather small range of this species, and its remaining suitable habitat is fragmented."
