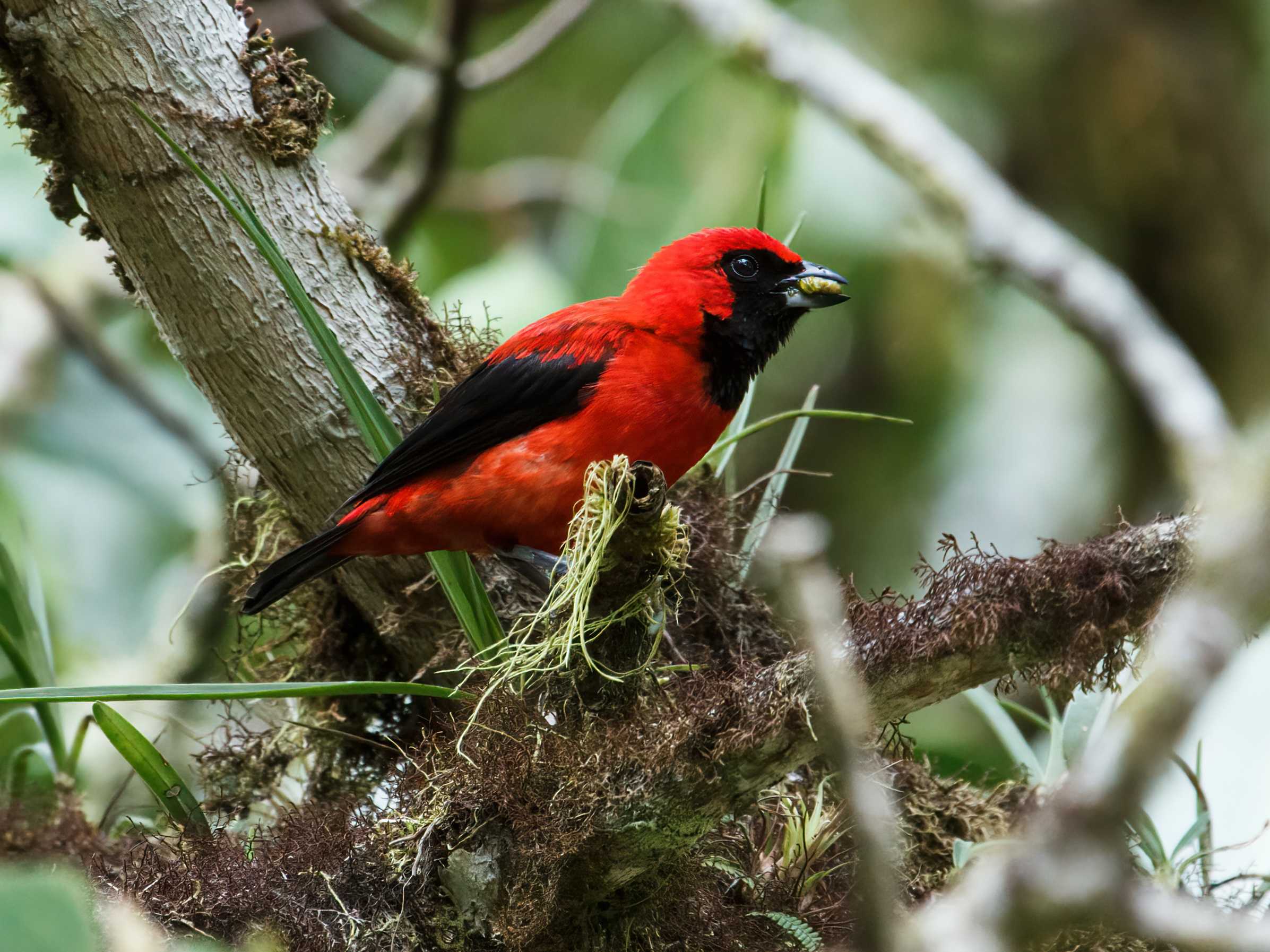

Conservation status
- Least Concern (IUCN 3.1)

Scientific classification
- Kingdom: Animalia
- Phylum: Chordata
- Class: Aves
- Order: Passeriformes
- Family: Thraupidae
- Genus: Calochaetes; Sclater, PL, 1879
- Species: C. coccineus

Binomial name
- Calochaetes coccineus (Sclater, PL, 1858)

Synonyms
- Euchaetes coccineus

= Vermilion tanager =

Species of bird

The vermilion tanager (Calochaetes coccineus) is a species of Neotropical bird in the tanager family Thraupidae. It is the only member of the genus Calochaetes.

It is found in Colombia, Ecuador, and Peru. Its natural habitat is subtropical or tropical moist montane forests.

== Taxonomy ==
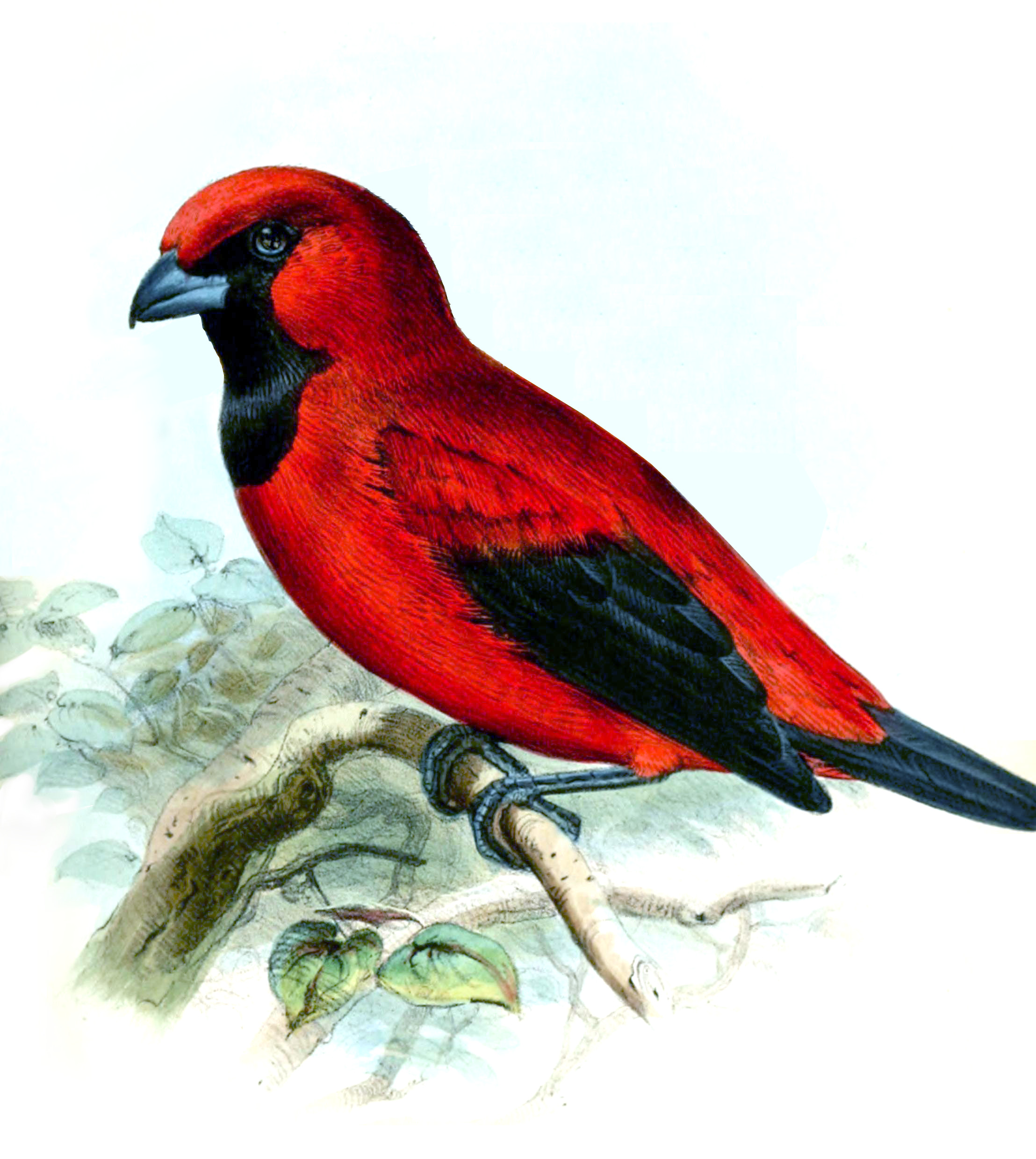

The vermilion tanager was formally described in 1858 by the English zoologist Philip Sclater from a specimen collected near the Napo River in Ecuador. He coined the binomial name Euchaetes coccineus. Sclater subsequently discovered that the genus name Euchaetes was already in use for a genus of moths and in 1879 proposed the replacement name Calochaetes. The new name combines the Ancient Greek kalos meaning beautiful with khaitē meaning "mane". The specific epithet coccineus is a Latin word meaning "scarlet-coloured". The genus contains a single species, the vermilion tanager. The species is monotypic: no subspecies are recognised.
