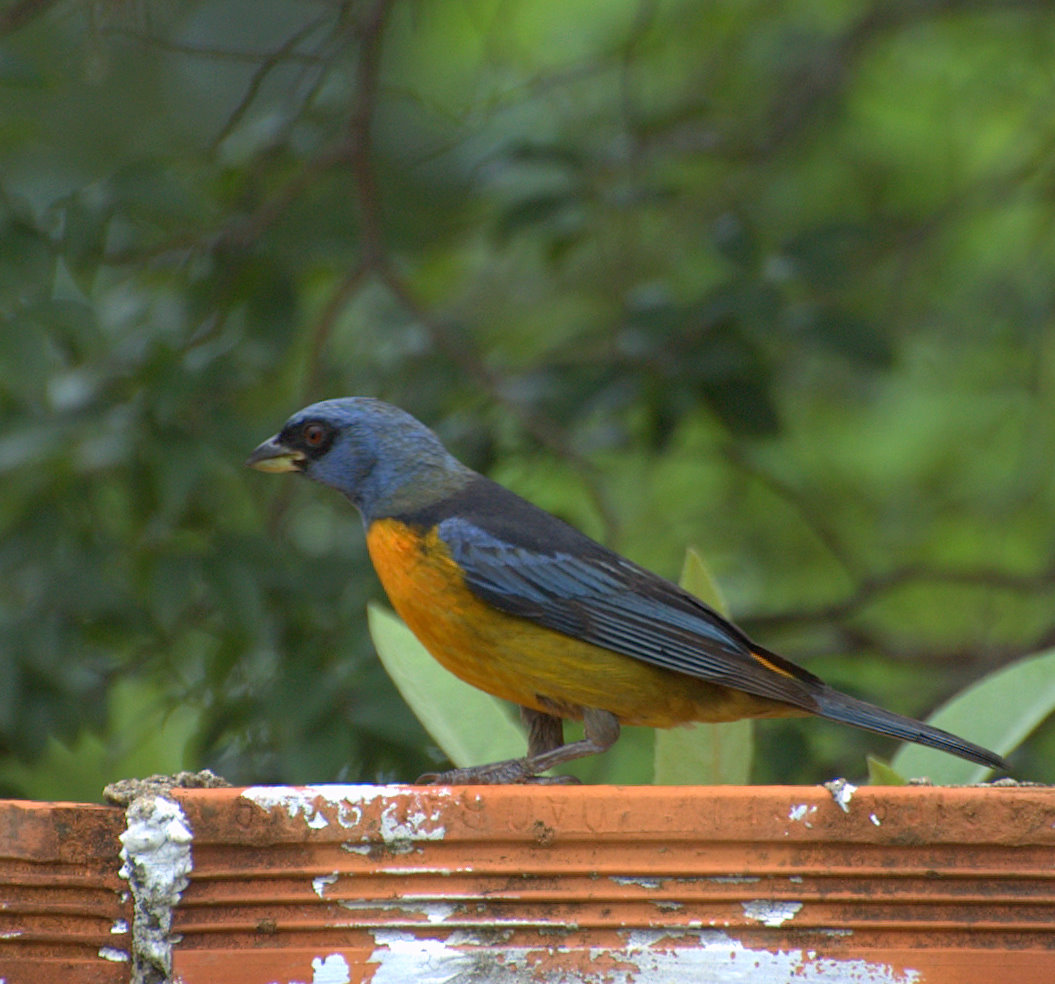
- Male of the black-backed nominate subspecies

Conservation status
- Least Concern (IUCN 3.1)

Scientific classification
- Kingdom: Animalia
- Phylum: Chordata
- Class: Aves
- Order: Passeriformes
- Family: Thraupidae
- Genus: Rauenia; Wolters, 1980
- Species: R. bonariensis

Binomial name
- Rauenia bonariensis (Gmelin, JF, 1789)

Synonyms
- Thraupis bonariensis

= Blue-and-yellow tanager =

Species of bird

The blue-and-yellow tanager (Rauenia bonariensis) is a species of bird in the tanager family Thraupidae.

== Distribution ==
It is found in Argentina, Uruguay, Brazil, Paraguay, Bolivia, extreme northern border of Chile, and Andean Peru and Ecuador. Some southern region birds migrate northeastwards in the austral winter into eastern Bolivia and northeastern Argentina; also Paraguay where the birds are only migratory non-breeding residents.

== Habitat ==
Its natural habitats are subtropical or tropical dry forest, subtropical or tropical moist lowland forest, subtropical or tropical moist montane forest, subtropical or tropical high-altitude shrubland, and heavily degraded former forest.

== Taxonomy ==
This species was formerly placed in the genus Thraupis. It was moved to Pipraeidea based on the results of a molecular phylogenetic study published in 2014. It was moved to Rauenia based on the study published in 2020. It is monotypic in that genus.

== Gallery ==
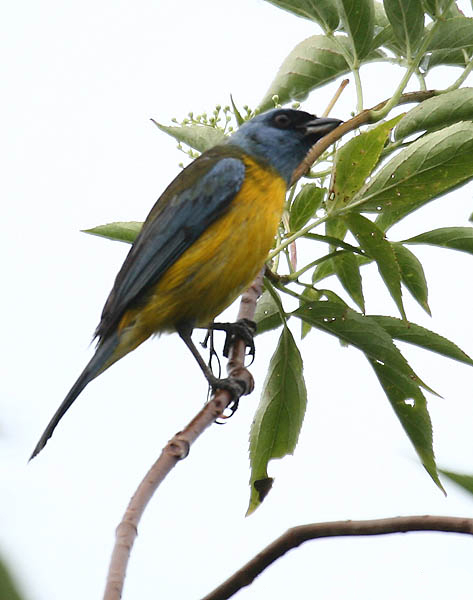
Males from the Andes, such as this individual from Ecuador, have a green back.

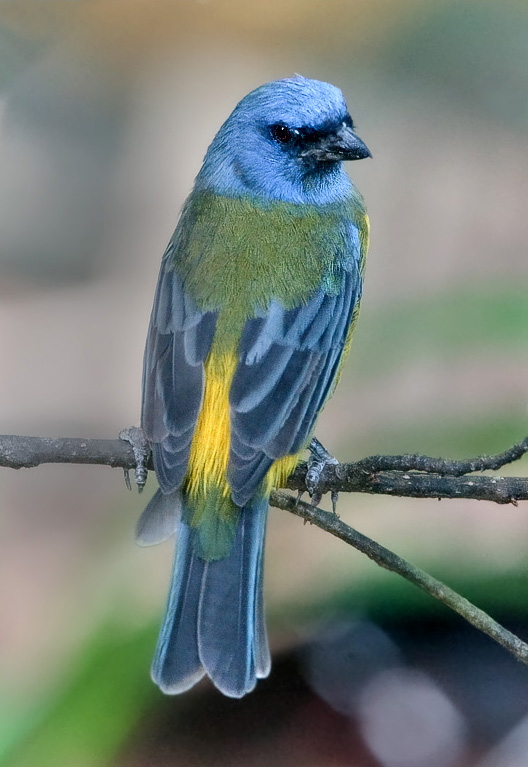
A male Rauenia bonariensis darwinii, characterized by green upper back
