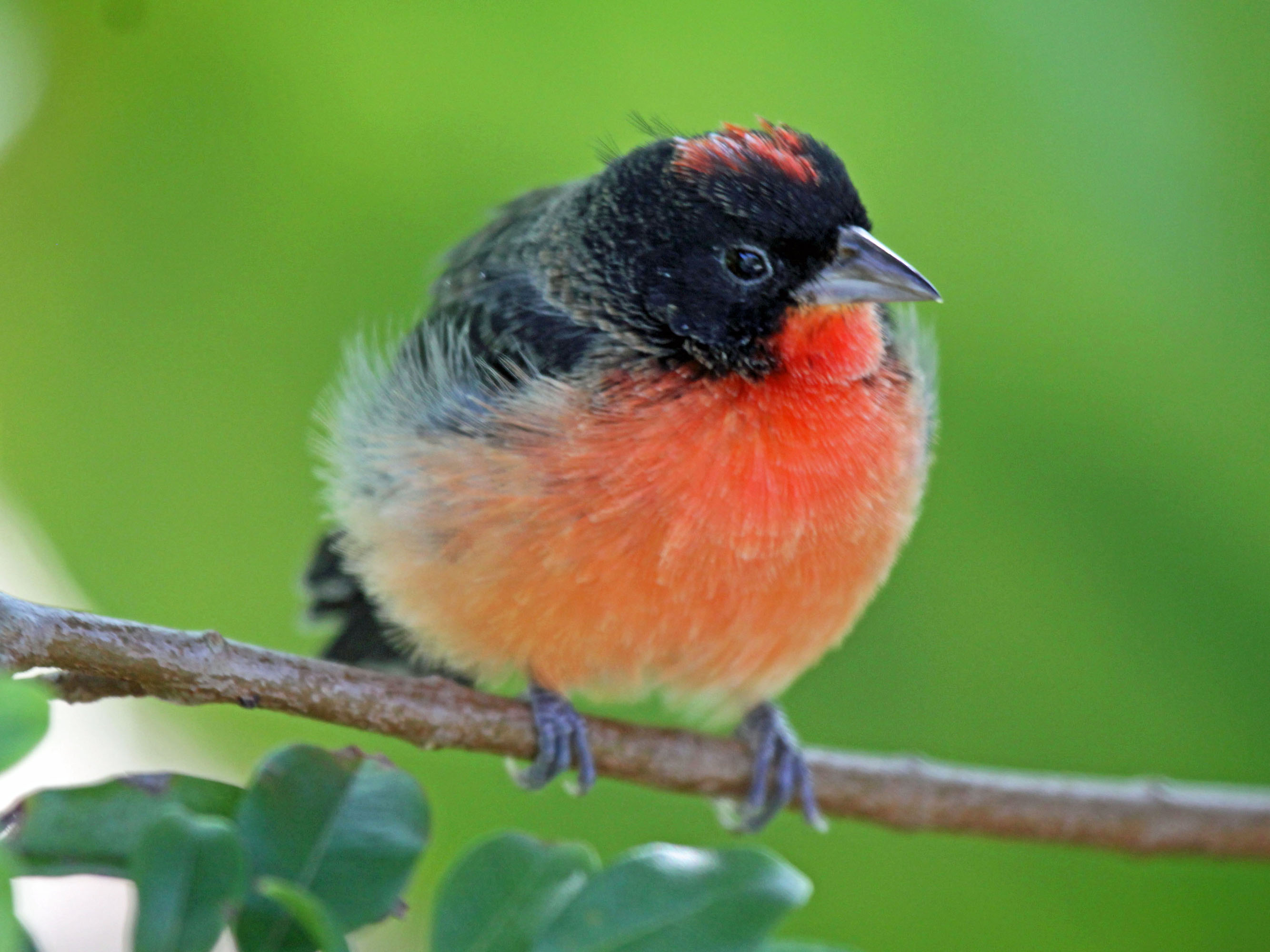

Conservation status
- Least Concern (IUCN 3.1)

Scientific classification
- Kingdom: Animalia
- Phylum: Chordata
- Class: Aves
- Order: Passeriformes
- Family: Thraupidae
- Genus: Rhodospingus; Sharpe, 1888
- Species: R. cruentus

Binomial name
- Rhodospingus cruentus (Lesson, 1844)

= Crimson-breasted finch =

Species of bird

The crimson-breasted finch, or crimson finch, (Rhodospingus cruentus) is a species of bird in the family Thraupidae, the tanagers and allies. It is found in Ecuador, Peru, and possibly Colombia.

== Taxonomy and systematics ==
The crimson-breasted finch was formally described in 1844 by the French naturalist René Lesson under the binomial name Tiaris cruentus. The type locality is Guayaquil in Ecuador. In 1888 the English ornithologist Richard Bowdler Sharpe erected the genus Rhodospingus for cruentis and it remains the only species in the genus. The genus name combines the Ancient Greek rhodon meaning "rose" and spingos meaning "finch". The specific epithet cruentus is the Latin word for "bloody". At the time, Tiaris and Rhodopingus were members of the finch family Fringillidae. Following a 2009 publication, taxonomists moved Rhodospingus to its present tanager family.

The crimson-breasted finch is monotypic.

== Description ==
The crimson-breasted finch is about 11 cm (4.3 in) long and weighs an average of 11.6 g (0.41 oz). It has a short-tailed appearance and a long, slender, relatively straight bill. The species is sexually dimorphic. Adult males have a blackish head with a bright red patch in the center of the crown; the patch can be raised as a crest. Their throat is red, intensifying to crimson on the breast and fading to a less intense red on the lower breast and belly. Their vent and undertail coverts are often whitish with a pink wash, and the coverts sometimes have dark centers. In fresh plumage the feathers of the back, nape, and occasionally the face have olive tips. Adult females have a buffy or pale yellowish supercilium and lower face. Their rest of their head and their upperparts, wings, and tail are pale brownish and their underparts buffy or pale yellowish with a brownish wash on the flanks. Immature birds resemble adult females though young males often have an orange wash on the breast. Both sexes have a dark brown iris, a blackish maxilla often with blue-gray tomia, a blue-gray mandible, and dark grayish legs.

== Distribution and habitat ==
The crimson-breasted finch is found on the Pacific slope from far northwestern Ecuador south into northwestern Peru to central Lambayeque Department. Although the IOC includes Colombia in the species' range, the South American Classification Committee (SACC) has only unconfirmed reports from that county and AviList does not include it. In Peru and southwestern Ecuador it inhabits dry forest and desert scrublands; further north it inhabits moister landscapes including the edges of forest. In elevation it is found below 750 m (2,500 ft) in Peru and mostly below 500 m (1,600 ft) in Ecuador.

== Behavior ==
=== Movement ===
The crimson-breasted finch is a partial migrant. Some proportion of the southern population moves from the drier to moister landscapes after the breeding season.

=== Feeding ===
The crimson-breasted finch is known to feed mostly on seeds and assumed to also eat arthropods during the breeding season. In the breeding season it forages singly and in pairs and outside it often with flocks of other seed-eating species. One source states that it mostly feeds on the ground during the non-breeding season and is more arboreal when breeding. Another states the opposite, "more arboreal, even feeding in flowering trees" in the non-breeding season.

=== Breeding ===
The crimson-breasted finch breeds between January and April or May during the rainy season. Both sexes build the nest, an "untidy mass" made from dead grass and other plant material lined with finer fibers. It is typically near the end of a branch in a bush or shrub up to about 0.4 m (1.3 ft) above the ground. The clutch is two to four eggs. The female alone incubates, for 10 to 12 days, and fledging occurs seven to nine days after hatch.

=== Vocalization ===
The male crimson-breasted finch during the breeding season sings "a buzzy tsee-tzztzz" that has been likened to the song of the blue-black grassquit (Volatinia jacarina). Its calls are "a sharp tchip or a descending tseer".

== Status ==
The IUCN has assessed the crimson-breasted finch as being of Least Concern. It has a large range; its population size is not known and is believed to be decreasing. No immediate threats have been identified. It is considered "common during [the] rainy season" in Ecuador and "rare to uncommon" in Peru.

== Gallery ==
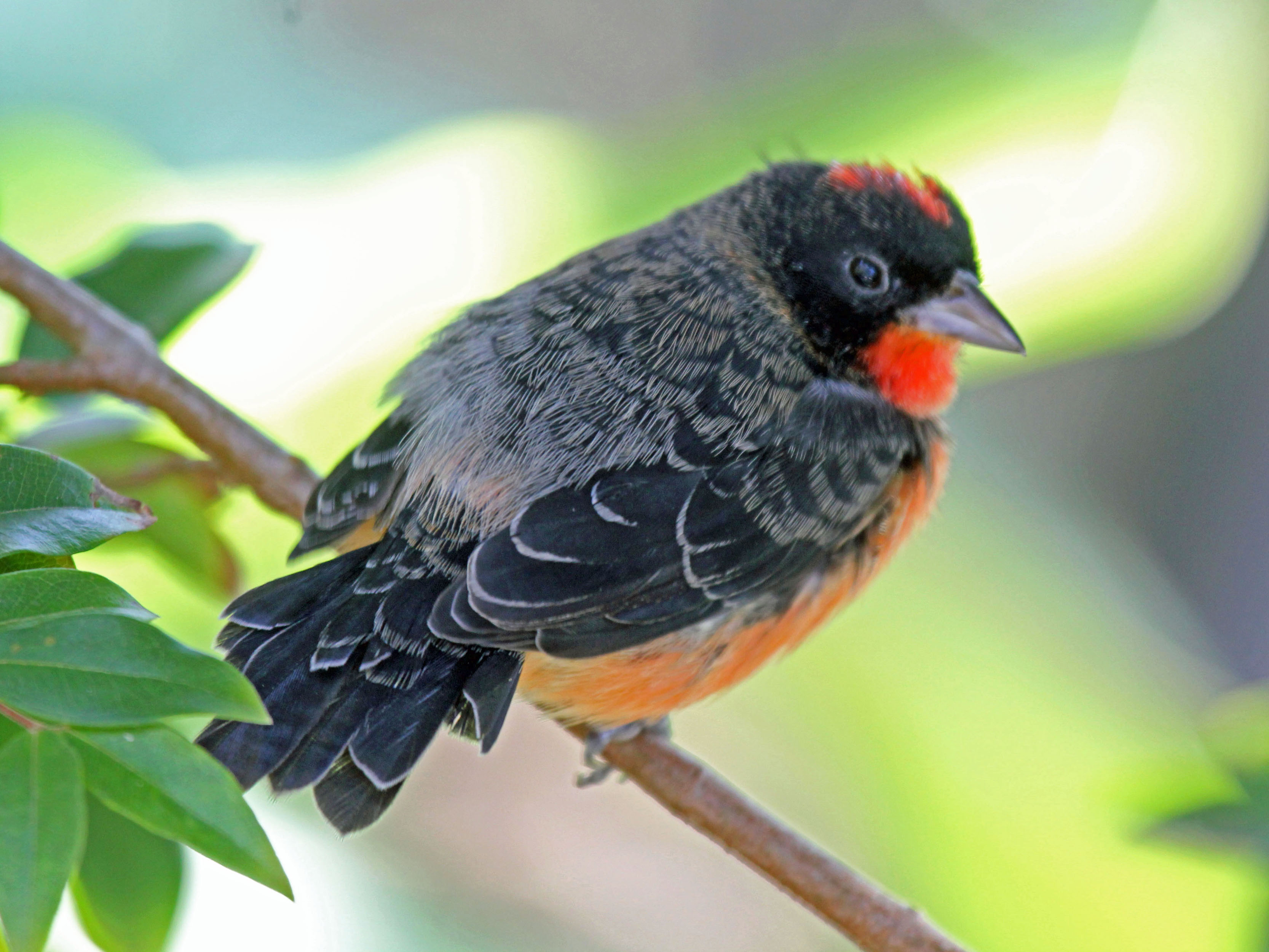
Crimson-breasted finch

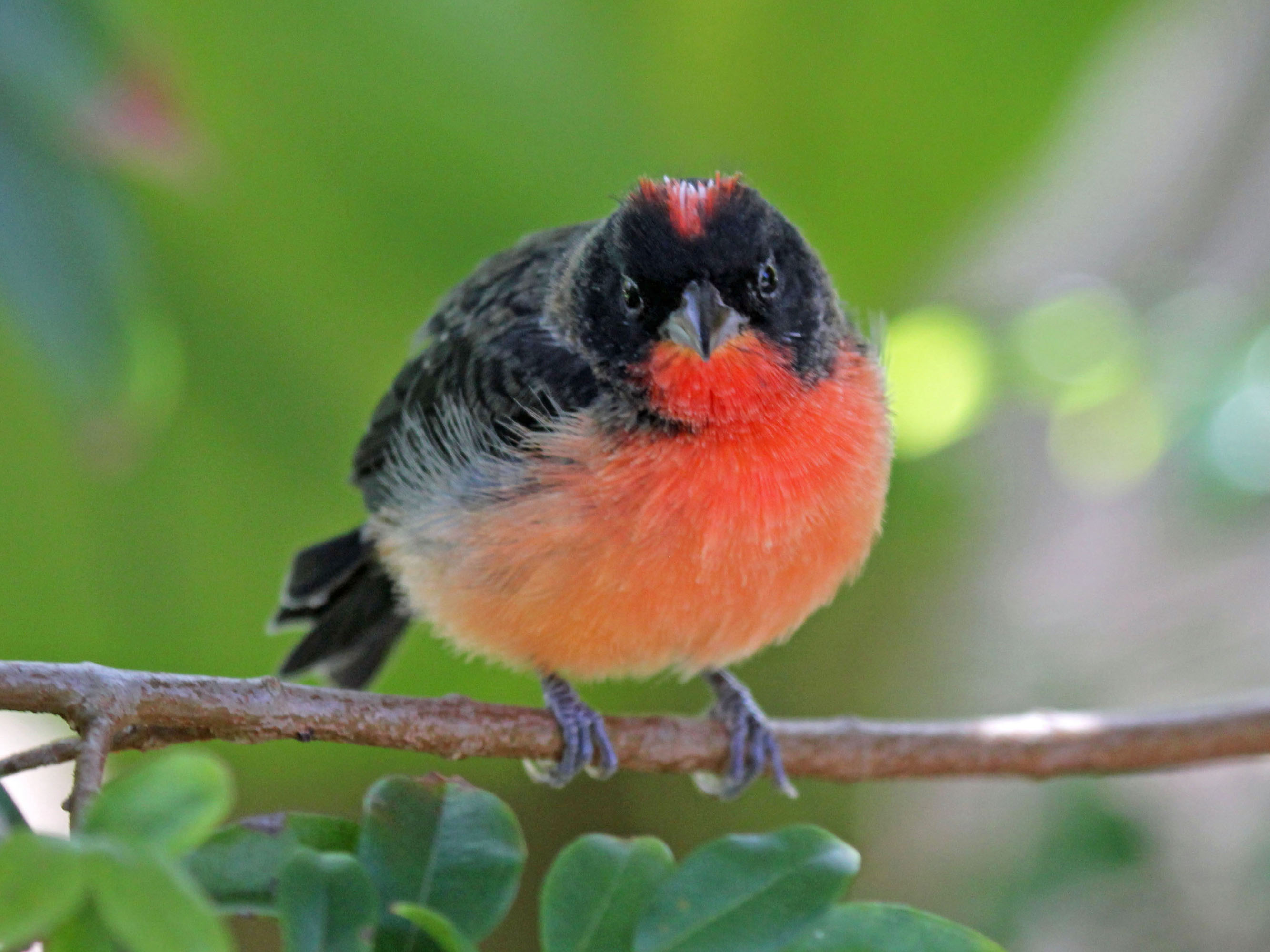
Crimson-breasted finch
