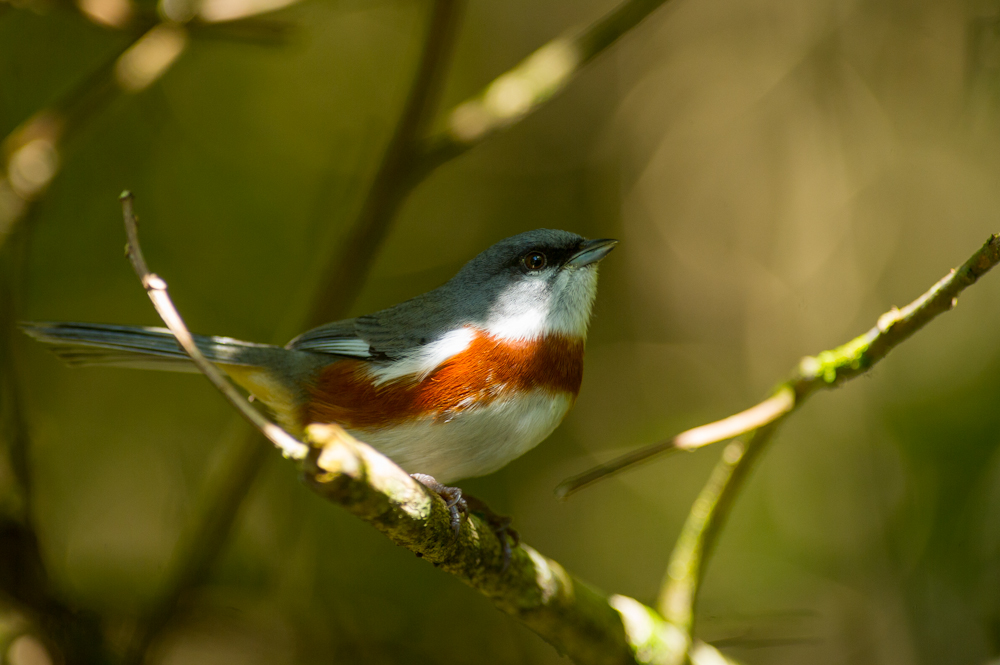

Conservation status
- Least Concern (IUCN 3.1)

Scientific classification
- Kingdom: Animalia
- Phylum: Chordata
- Class: Aves
- Order: Passeriformes
- Family: Thraupidae
- Genus: Castanozoster; Burns, Unitt & Mason, 2016
- Species: C. thoracicus

Binomial name
- Castanozoster thoracicus (Nordmann, 1835)

= Bay-chested warbling finch =

Species of bird

The bay-chested warbling finch (Castanozoster thoracicus) is a species of bird in the family Thraupidae. It is endemic to southeastern Brazil. Its natural habitats are temperate forests and subtropical or tropical moist montane forests.

== Taxonomy ==
The bay-chested warbling finch was formally described in 1835 by the Finnish naturalist Alexander von Nordmann from a specimen collected in Brazil. He coined the binomial name Fringilla thoracica. This species was traditionally placed in the genus Poospiza. A molecular phylogenetic study published in 2014 found that the genus was polyphyletic. In the subsequent reorganisation the bay-chested warbling finch was moved to its own newly erected genus Castanozoster. The name combines the Ancient Greek καστανό meaning "chestnut" with ζωστήρ meaning "belt". The bay-chested warbling finch is monotypic: no subspecies are recognised.

== Description ==
The bay-chested warbling finch is a rather dainty, warbler-like finch, measuring 13.5 cm long on average and with an average weight of 11–12.8 g. Males have gray upperparts, getting progressively browner from the head to the tail. The grayish upper-wing displays a white flash when the wings are closed, created by the white edges and bases of the outer primaries. The anterior edge of the wings is also white due to the white marginal coverts. The throat, cheek, and underparts are also white, interrupted by a bright reddish-brown breast-band stretching along the sides to the flanks. The crissum is cream-buff. The thin, dark gray bill has a slightly curved upper mandible and darker tip. The iris is dark brown and the legs are reddish to brownish gray. Females look broadly similar to males, but duller and paler in color.

== Distribution and habitat ==
The bay-chested warbling finch is endemic to Brazil, where it is found in the mountains of the south and southeast. It has a disjunct range, being found in the coastal mountains near the border between Minas Gerais and Rio de Janeiro and in the highlands from southern Paraná south through eastern São Paulo down to northeastern Rio Grande do Sul. Its preferred habitats are woodland edge, open woodlands, scrubby habitats, and clearings at elevations between 800 and 1500 m.

== Biology ==
The bay-chested warbling finch feeds on small invertebrates and fruit. Foraging takes place in pairs or small flocks, and the finches are often found as part of mixed-species foraging flocks, especially alongside buff-throated warbling finches. Invertebrates are gleaned from foliage. It is known to breed in January.

== Conservation ==
The bay-chested warbling finch is classified as being of least concern due to its fairly large range and population.. It is generally uncommon within its range, but can be locally rather common. Its population is thought to be declining due to habitat loss. It is known from several protected areas within the Atlantic Forest, including Itatiaia National Park.
