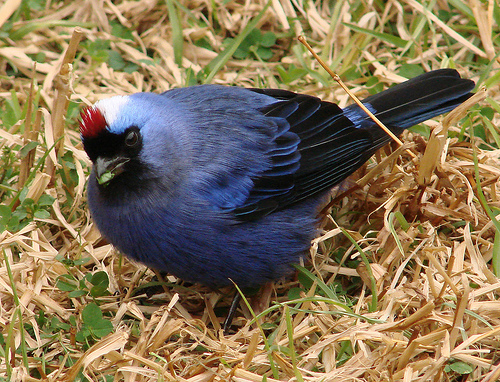

Conservation status
- Least Concern (IUCN 3.1)

Scientific classification
- Kingdom: Animalia
- Phylum: Chordata
- Class: Aves
- Order: Passeriformes
- Family: Thraupidae
- Genus: Stephanophorus; Strickland, 1841
- Species: S. diadematus

Binomial name
- Stephanophorus diadematus (Temminck, 1823)

Synonyms
- Tanagra diademata (protonym)

= Diademed tanager =

Species of bird

The diademed tanager (Stephanophorus diadematus) is a species of Neotropical bird in the tanager family Thraupidae. It is the only member of the genus Stephanophorus. It is purple-blue with a white crown characterised by a small red patch, and it is found mostly in open areas in southern Brazil, northeast Argentina, and Uruguay.

== Taxonomy ==
The diademed tanager was formally described and illustrated in 1823 by the Dutch zoologist Coenraad Jacob Temminck under the binomial name Tanagra diademata. The type locality is Curitiba in Brazil. This is now the only species placed in the genus Stephanophorus that was introduced in 1841 by the English naturalist Hugh Edwin Strickland. The genus name combines the Ancient Greek stephanē meaning "diadem" and -phoros meaning "carrying". The specific epithet diadematus is Latin meaning "diademed". The diademed tanager is monotypic: no subspecies are recognised.

== Description ==
The diademed tanager is, on average, 19 cm (7.5 in) long and weighs 35–41.5 g (1–1 oz). When illuminated well, it is mostly dark glossy bluish-violet in color, although the coloration often seems dull blackish in poor light. The wings and tail have blue-bordered black feathers, while the face from the front of the crown down to the chins is black, giving the appearance of a "mask". The crown is white with a red patch anteriorly.

== Distribution and habitat ==
The diademed tanager is found from Minas Gerais in Brazil through the southeast of that country, south through eastern Paraguay into all of Uruguay and far northeastern Argentina. It is a denizen of a variety of forested environments, such as riparian forest, Araucaria conifer forests, scrubland adjacent to marshes, and man-made habitats like gardens. It is a lowland species through most of its range, but is limited to highlands in Rio de Janeiro. Argentinian and southern Uruguayan populations of the species may conduct localized migrations.

== Biology ==
=== Diet ===
The diademed tanager is largely frugivorous, supplementing its diet with flowers, insects, and the honeydew produced by plant lice. Foraging takes place in pairs or small flocks that are part of larger mixed-species groups.
