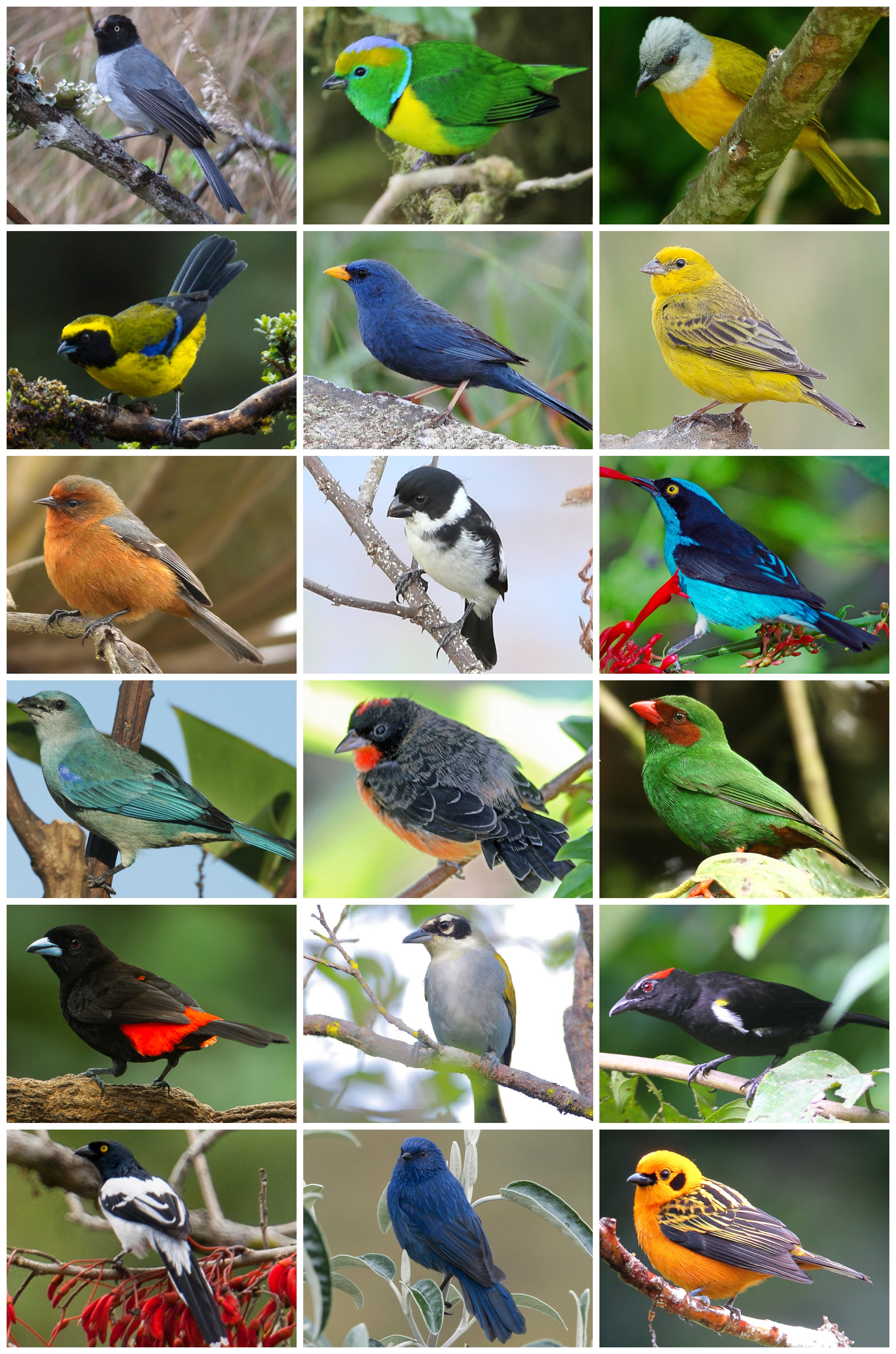

Scientific classification
- Kingdom: Animalia
- Phylum: Chordata
- Class: Aves
- Order: Passeriformes
- Superfamily: Emberizoidea
- Family: Thraupidae; Cabanis, 1847

Type genus
- Thraupis Boie, F., 1826

Genera
- Many: see text

= Tanager =

Tanagers

Family of birds

The tanagers (singular /ˈtænədʒər/) comprise the bird family Thraupidae, in the order Passeriformes. The family has a Neotropical distribution and is the second-largest family of birds. It represents about 4% of all avian species and 12% of the Neotropical birds.

Traditionally, the family contained around 240 species of mostly brightly colored fruit-eating birds. As more of these birds were studied using modern molecular techniques, it became apparent that the traditional families were not monophyletic. Euphonia and Chlorophonia, which were once considered part of the tanager family, are now treated as members of the Fringillidae, in their own subfamily (Euphoniinae). Likewise, the genera Piranga (which includes the scarlet tanager, summer tanager, and western tanager), Chlorothraupis, and Habia appear to be members of the family Cardinalidae, and have been reassigned to that family by the American Ornithological Society.

== Description ==
Tanagers are small to medium-sized birds. The shortest-bodied species, the white-eared conebill, is 9 cm (4 in) long and weighs 6 g (0.2 oz), barely smaller than the short-billed honeycreeper. The longest, the magpie tanager is 28 cm (11 in) and weighs 76 g (2.7 oz). The heaviest is the white-capped tanager, which weighs 114 g (4.02 oz) and measures about 24 cm (9.4 in). Both sexes are usually the same size and weight.

Tanagers are often brightly colored, but some species are black and white, and some dull brownish or greenish-gray. Males are typically more brightly colored than females and juveniles. Most tanagers have short, rounded wings. The shape of the bill is linked to the species' foraging habits, with short-, stout-billed seed-eating species, longer-billed fruit-eating species, and slender-billed nectar-feeding species; most also eat insects when available.

== Distribution ==
Tanagers are restricted to the Western Hemisphere and mainly to the tropics. About 60% of tanagers live in South America, and 30% of these species live in the Andes. Many species are endemic to a relatively small area.

== Behavior ==
Most tanagers live in pairs or in small groups of three to five individuals. These groups may consist simply of parents and their offspring. These birds may also be seen in single-species or mixed flocks. Many tanagers are thought to have dull songs, though some are elaborate.

=== Diet ===
Tanagers are omnivorous, and their diets vary by genus. They have been seen eating fruit, seeds, nectar, flower parts, and insects. Many pick insects off branches or from holes in wood. Other species look for insects on the undersides of leaves. Yet others wait on branches until they see a flying insect and catch it in the air. Many of these particular species inhabit the same areas, but these specializations alleviate competition.

=== Breeding ===
The breeding season is March through June in temperate areas and in September through October in South America. Some species are territorial, while others build their nests closer together. Little information is available on tanager breeding behavior. Males show off their brightest feathers to potential mates and rival males. Some species' courtship rituals involve bowing and tail lifting.

Most tanagers build cup nests on branches in trees. Some nests are almost globular. Entrances are usually built on the side of the nest. The nests can be shallow or deep. The species of tree in which they choose to build their nests and the nests' positions vary among genera. Most species nest in areas with dense vegetation. For some species no information is yet known about the nests.

The clutch size is three to five eggs. The female incubates the eggs and builds the nest, but the male may feed the female while she incubates. Both sexes feed the young. Five species have helpers assist in feeding the young. These helpers are thought to be the previous year's nestlings.

== Taxonomy ==
The family Thraupidae was introduced (as the subfamily Thraupinae) in 1847 by German ornithologist Jean Cabanis. The type genus is Thraupis.

The family Thraupidae is a member of an assemblage of over 800 birds known as the New World, nine-primaried oscines. The traditional pre-molecular classification was largely based on the different feeding specializations. Nectar-feeders were placed in Coerebidae (honeycreepers), large-billed seed-eaters in Cardinalidae (cardinals and grosbeaks), smaller-billed seed-eaters in Emberizidae (New World finches and sparrows), ground-foraging insect-eaters in Icteridae (blackbirds) and fruit-eaters in Thraupidae. This classification was known to be problematic as analyses using other morphological characteristics often produced conflicting phylogenies. Beginning in the last decade of the 20th century, a series of molecular phylogenetic studies led to a complete reorganization of the traditional families. Thraupidae now includes large-billed seed eaters, thin-billed nectar feeders, and foliage gleaners as well as fruit-eaters.

One consequence of redefining the family boundaries is that for many species their common names are no longer congruent with the families in which they are placed. As of July 2020 there are 39 species with "tanager" in the common name that are not placed in Thraupidae. These include the widely distributed scarlet tanager and western tanager, which are both now placed in Cardinalidae. There are also 106 species within Thraupidae that have "finch" in their common name.

A molecular phylogenetic study published in 2014 revealed that many of the traditional genera were not monophyletic. In the resulting reorganization six new genera were introduced, eleven genera were resurrected, and seven genera were abandoned.

As of March 2025 the family contains 393 species which are divided into 15 subfamilies and 105 genera. For a complete list, see the article List of tanager species.

=== List of genera ===
==== Catamblyrhynchinae ====
The plushcap has no close relatives and is now placed in its own subfamily. It was previously placed either in the subfamily Catamblyrhynchinae within the Emberizidae or in its own family Catamblyrhynchidae.

Image	Genus	Species
	Catamblyrhynchus Lafresnaye, 1842	Plushcap – Catamblyrhynchus diadema

==== Charitospizinae ====
The coal-crested finch is endemic to the grasslands of Brazil and has no close relatives. It is unusual in that both sexes have a crest. It was formerly placed in Emberizidae.

Image	Genus	Species
	Charitospiza Oberholser, 1905	Coal-crested finch – Charitospiza eucosma

==== Orchesticinae ====
Two species with large thick bills. Parkerthraustes was formerly placed in Cardinalidae.

Image	Genus	Species
	Orchesticus Cabanis, 1851	Brown tanager – Orchesticus abeillei
	Parkerthraustes Remsen, 1997	Yellow-shouldered grosbeak, Parkerthraustes humeralis

==== Nemosiinae ====
Brightly colored, sexually dichromatic birds. Most form single-species flocks.

Image	Genus	Species
	Nemosia Vieillot, 1816	Hooded tanager, Nemosia pileata; Cherry-throated tanager, Nemosia rourei
	Cyanicterus Bonaparte, 1850	Blue-backed tanager – Cyanicterus cyanicterus
	Sericossypha Lesson, 1844	White-capped tanager – Sericossypha albocristata
	Compsothraupis Richmond, 1915	Scarlet-throated tanager – Compsothraupis loricata

==== Emberizoidinae ====
Grassland dwelling birds that were formerly placed in Emberizidae.

Image	Genus	Species
	Coryphaspiza G.R. Gray, 1840	Black-masked finch – Coryphaspiza melanotis
	Embernagra Lesson, 1831	Serra finch – Embernagra longicauda; Pampa finch – Embernagra platensis
	Emberizoides Temminck, 1822	Wedge-tailed grass finch – Emberizoides herbicola; Duida grass finch – Emberizoides duidae; Lesser grass finch – Emberizoides ypiranganus

==== Porphyrospizinae ====
Yellow billed birds. The blue finch (Rhopospina caerulescens) was formerly placed in Cardinalidae; the other species were formerly placed in Emberizidae.

Image	Genus	Species
	Incaspiza Ridgway, 1898	Great Inca finch – Incaspiza pulchra; Rufous-backed Inca finch – Incaspiza personata; Grey-winged Inca finch – Incaspiza ortizi; Buff-bridled Inca finch – Incaspiza laeta; Little Inca finch – Incaspiza watkinsi
	Rhopospina Cabanis, 1851	Mourning sierra finch – Rhopospina fruticeti; Blue finch – Rhopospina caerulescens; Band-tailed sierra finch – Rhopospina alaudina; Carbonated sierra finch – Rhopospina carbonaria

==== Hemithraupinae ====
These species are sexually dichromatic and many have yellow and black plumage. Except for Heterospingus, they have slender bills.

Image	Genus	Species
	Chlorophanes Reichenbach, 1853	Green honeycreeper – Chlorophanes spiza
	Iridophanes Ridgway, 1901	Golden-collared honeycreeper – Iridophanes pulcherrimus
	Chrysothlypis Berlepsch, 1912	Black-and-yellow tanager – Chrysothlypis chrysomelas; Scarlet-and-white tanager – Chrysothlypis salmoni
	Heterospingus Ridgway, 1898	Sulphur-rumped tanager – Heterospingus rubrifrons; Scarlet-browed tanager – Heterospingus xanthopygius
	Hemithraupis Cabanis, 1850	Guira tanager – Hemithraupis guira; Rufous-headed tanager – Hemithraupis ruficapilla; Yellow-backed tanager – Hemithraupis flavicollis

==== Dacninae ====
Sexually dichromatic species—males have blue plumage and females are green.

Image	Genus	Species
	Tersina Vieillot, 1819	Swallow tanager – Tersina viridis
	Cyanerpes Oberholser, 1899	Short-billed honeycreeper – Cyanerpes nitidus; Shining honeycreeper – Cyanerpes lucidus; Purple honeycreeper – Cyanerpes caeruleus; Red-legged honeycreeper – Cyanerpes cyaneus
	Dacnis Cuvier, 1816	Scarlet-breasted dacnis – Dacnis berlepschi; Scarlet-thighed dacnis – Dacnis venusta; Blue dacnis – Dacnis cayana; Yellow-bellied dacnis – Dacnis flaviventer; Turquoise dacnis – Dacnis hartlaubi; Black-faced dacnis – Dacnis lineata; Yellow-tufted dacnis – Dacnis egregia; Viridian dacnis – Dacnis viguieri; Black-legged dacnis – Dacnis nigripes; White-bellied dacnis – Dacnis albiventris

==== Saltatorinae ====
Mainly arboreal with long tails and thick bills. Formerly placed in Cardinalidae.

Image	Genus	Species
	Saltatricula Burmeister, 1861	Many-colored Chaco finch – Saltatricula multicolor; Black-throated saltator – Saltatricula atricollis
	Saltator Vieillot, 1816	Orinoco saltator – Saltator orenocensis; Green-winged saltator – Saltator similis; Bluish-grey saltator or Amazonian grey saltator – Saltator coerulescens; Cinnamon-bellied saltator or northern grey saltator – Saltator grandis; Olive-grey saltator or Caribbean grey saltator – Saltator olivascens; Streaked saltator – Saltator striatipectus; Lesser Antillean saltator – Saltator albicollis; Buff-throated saltator – Saltator maximus; Black-winged saltator – Saltator atripennis; Black-headed saltator – Saltator atriceps; Black-cowled saltator – Saltator nigriceps; Black-throated grosbeak – Saltator fuliginosus; Slate-coloured grosbeak – Saltator grossus; Masked saltator – Saltator cinctus; Thick-billed saltator – Saltator maxillosus; Golden-billed saltator – Saltator aurantiirostris

==== Coerebinae ====
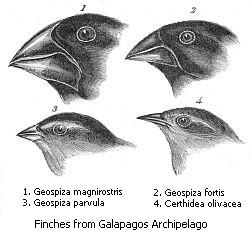
Diversity of Darwin's finches

This subfamily includes Darwin's finches, of which all but the Cocos finch are endemic to the Galápagos Islands. Most Coerebinae species were formerly placed in Emberizidae; the exceptions are the bananaquit that was placed in Parulidae and the orangequit that was placed in Thraupidae. These species build domed or covered nests with side entrances. They have evolved a variety of foraging techniques, including nectar-feeding (Coereba, Euneornis), seed-eating (Geospiza, Loxigilla, Tiaris), and insect gleaning (Certhidea).

Image	Genus	Species
	Coereba Vieillot, 1809	Bananaquit – Coereba flaveola
	Tiaris Swainson, 1827	Yellow-faced grassquit – Tiaris olivaceus
	Euneornis Fitzinger, 1856	Orangequit – Euneornis campestris
	Melopyrrha Bonaparte, 1853	Puerto Rican bullfinch – Melopyrrha portoricensis (formerly placed in Loxigilla); †St. Kitts bullfinch – Melopyrrha grandis; Greater Antillean bullfinch – Melopyrrha violacea (formerly placed in Loxigilla); Cuban bullfinch – Melopyrrha nigra; Grand Cayman bullfinch – Melopyrrha taylori
	Loxipasser Bryant, 1866	Yellow-shouldered grassquit – Loxipasser anoxanthus
	Phonipara Bonaparte, 1850	Cuban grassquit – Phonipara canora
	Loxigilla Lesson, 1831	Lesser Antillean bullfinch – Loxigilla noctis; Barbados bullfinch – Loxigilla barbadensis
	Melanospiza Ridgway, 1897	Saint Lucia black finch – Melanospiza richardsoni; Black-faced grassquit – Melanospiza bicolor
	Asemospiza Burns, Unitt, & Mason, 2016	Sooty grassquit – Asemospiza fuliginosa; Dull-coloured grassquit – Asemospiza obscura
Darwin's finches:
	Certhidea Gould, 1837	Green warbler-finch – Certhidea olivacea; Grey warbler-finch – Certhidea fusca
	Platyspiza Ridgway, 1897	Vegetarian finch – Platyspiza crassirostris
	Pinaroloxias Sharpe, 1885	Cocos finch – Pinaroloxias inornata
	Camarhynchus Gould, 1837	Small tree finch – Camarhynchus parvulus; Medium tree finch – Camarhynchus pauper; Large tree finch – Camarhynchus psittacula; Woodpecker finch – Camarhynchus pallidus; Mangrove finch – Camarhynchus heliobates
	Geospiza Gould, 1837	Española cactus finch – Geospiza conirostris; Sharp-beaked ground finch – Geospiza difficilis; Vampire ground finch – Geospiza septentrionalis; Genovesa ground finch – Geospiza acutirostris; Medium ground finch – Geospiza fortis; Small ground finch – Geospiza fuliginosa; Large ground finch – Geospiza magnirostris; Common cactus finch – Geospiza scandens; Genovesa cactus finch – Geospiza propinqua

==== Tachyphoninae ====
Most of these are lowland species. Many have ornamental features such as crests, and many have sexually dichromatic plumage.

Image	Genus	Species
	Volatinia Reichenbach, 1850	Blue-black grassquit – Volatinia jacarina
	Conothraupis Sclater, PL, 1880	Black-and-white tanager – Conothraupis speculigera; Cone-billed tanager – Conothraupis mesoleuca
	Creurgops Sclater, PL, 1858	Rufous-crested tanager – Creurgops verticalis; Slaty tanager – Creurgops dentatus
	Eucometis Sclater, PL, 1856	Grey-headed tanager – Eucometis penicillata
	Trichothraupis Cabanis, 1851	Black-goggled tanager – Trichothraupis melanops
	Heliothraupis Lane et al., 2021	Inti tanager – Heliothraupis oneilli
	Loriotus Jarocki, 1821	Flame-crested tanager – Loriotus cristatus; Yellow-crested tanager – Loriotus rufiventer; White-shouldered tanager – Loriotus luctuosus
	Coryphospingus Cabanis, 1851	Grey pileated finch – Coryphospingus pileatus; Red pileated finch – Coryphospingus cucullatus
	Tachyphonus Vieillot, 1816	Fulvous-crested tanager – Tachyphonus surinamus; Tawny-crested tanager – Tachyphonus delatrii; Ruby-crowned tanager – Tachyphonus coronatus; White-lined tanager – Tachyphonus rufus; Red-shouldered tanager – Tachyphonus phoenicius
	Rhodospingus Sharpe, 1888	Crimson-breasted finch – Rhodospingus cruentus
	Lanio Vieillot, 1816	Fulvous shrike-tanager – Lanio fulvus; White-winged shrike-tanager – Lanio versicolor; Black-throated shrike-tanager – Lanio aurantius; White-throated shrike-tanager – Lanio leucothorax
	Ramphocelus Desmarest, 1805	Crimson-collared tanager – Ramphocelus sanguinolentus; Masked crimson tanager – Ramphocelus nigrogularis; Crimson-backed tanager – Ramphocelus dimidiatus; Huallaga tanager – Ramphocelus melanogaster; Silver-beaked tanager – Ramphocelus carbo; Brazilian tanager – Ramphocelus bresilius; Passerini's tanager – Ramphocelus passerinii; Cherrie's tanager – Ramphocelus costaricensis; Flame-rumped tanager – Ramphocelus flammigerus; Lemon-rumped tanager – R. f. icteronotus

==== Sporophilinae ====
These species were formerly placed in Emberizidae.

Image	Genus	Species
	Sporophila Cabanis, 1844	Seedeaters and seed finches (includes species previously assigned to Dolospingus and Oryzoborus) 41 species: Lesson's seedeater – Sporophila bouvronides; Lined seedeater – Sporophila lineola; Cinnamon-rumped seedeater – Sporophila torqueola; Morelet's seedeater – Sporophila morelleti; Variable seedeater – Sporophila corvina; Grey seedeater – Sporophila intermedia; Wing-barred seedeater – Sporophila americana; White-naped seedeater – Sporophila fringilloides; Black-and-white seedeater – Sporophila luctuosa; Double-collared seedeater – Sporophila caerulescens; Yellow-bellied seedeater – Sporophila nigricollis; Dubois's seedeater – Sporophila ardesiaca; Thick-billed seed finch – Sporophila funerea; Chestnut-bellied seed finch – Sporophila angolensis; Nicaraguan seed finch – Sporophila nuttingi; Great-billed seed finch – Sporophila maximiliani; Large-billed seed finch – Sporophila crassirostris; Black-billed seed finch – Sporophila atrirostris; Slate-coloured seedeater – Sporophila schistacea; Temminck's seedeater – Sporophila falcirostris; Buffy-fronted seedeater – Sporophila frontalis; Plumbeous seedeater – Sporophila plumbea; Tropeiro seedeater – Sporophila beltoni; Rusty-collared seedeater – Sporophila collaris; White-throated seedeater – Sporophila albogularis; White-bellied seedeater – Sporophila leucoptera; Parrot-billed seedeater – Sporophila peruviana; Chestnut-throated seedeater, Sporophila telasco; Drab seedeater – Sporophila simplex; Chestnut-bellied seedeater – Sporophila castaneiventris; Ruddy-breasted seedeater – Sporophila minuta; Copper seedeater – Sporophila bouvreuil; Black-and-tawny seedeater – Sporophila nigrorufa; Tawny-bellied seedeater – Sporophila hypoxantha; Dark-throated seedeater – Sporophila ruficollis; Pearly-bellied seedeater – Sporophila pileata; Rufous-rumped seedeater – Sporophila hypochroma; Chestnut seedeater – Sporophila cinnamomea; Marsh seedeater – Sporophila palustris; Black-bellied seedeater – Sporophila melanogaster; Ibera seedeater – Sporophila iberaensis

==== Poospizinae ====
Some of these species were formerly placed in Emberizidae.

Image	Genus	Species
	Piezorina Lafresnaye, 1843	Cinereous finch – Piezorina cinerea
	Xenospingus Cabanis, 1867	Slender-billed finch – Xenospingus concolor
	Cnemoscopus Bangs & Penard, 1919	Pink-billed cnemoscopus – Cnemoscopus rubrirostris; Black-billed cnemoscopus – Cnemoscopus chrysogaster
	Pseudospingus Berlepsch & Stolzmann, 1896	Drab hemispingus – Pseudospingus xanthophthalmus; Black-headed hemispingus – Pseudospingus verticalis
	Poospiza Cabanis, 1847	Bolivian warbling finch – Poospiza boliviana; Cinnamon warbling finch – Poospiza ornata; Black-and-rufous warbling finch – Poospiza nigrorufa; Black-and-chestnut warbling finch – Poospiza whitii; Collared warbling finch – Poospiza hispaniolensis; Rufous-breasted warbling finch – Poospiza rubecula; Tucumán mountain finch – Poospiza baeri; Cochabamba mountain finch – Poospiza garleppi; Slaty-backed hemispingus – Poospiza goeringi; Rufous-browed hemispingus – Poospiza rufosuperciliaris
	Kleinothraupis Burns, Unitt, & Mason, 2016	Grey-capped hemispingus – Kleinothraupis reyi; Black-capped hemispingus – Kleinothraupis atropileus; White-browed hemispingus – Kleinothraupis auricularis; Orange-browed hemispingus – Kleinothraupis calophrys; Parodi's hemispingus – Kleinothraupis parodii
	Sphenopsis Sclater, 1862	Oleaginous hemispingus – Sphenopsis frontalis; Black-eared hemispingus – Sphenopsis melanotis; Piura hemispingus – Sphenopsis piurae; Western hemispingus – Sphenopsis ochracea
	Thlypopsis Cabanis, 1851	Fulvous-headed tanager – Thlypopsis fulviceps; Rufous-chested tanager – Thlypopsis ornata; Brown-flanked tanager – Thlypopsis pectoralis; Orange-headed tanager – Thlypopsis sordida; Buff-bellied tanager – Thlypopsis inornata; Rust-and-yellow tanager – Thlypopsis ruficeps
	Castanozoster Burns, Unitt, & Mason, 2016	Bay-chested warbling finch – Castanozoster thoracicus
	Donacospiza Cabanis, 1851	Long-tailed reed finch – Donacospiza albifrons
	Cypsnagra Lesson, R, 1831	White-rumped tanager – Cypsnagra hirundinacea
	Poospizopsis Berlepsch, 1893	Rufous-sided warbling finch – Poospizopsis hypocondria; Chestnut-breasted mountain finch – Poospizopsis caesar
	Urothraupis Taczanowski & Berlepsch, 1885	Black-backed bush tanager – Urothraupis stolzmanni
	Nephelornis Lowery & Tallman, 1976	Pardusco – Nephelornis oneilli
	Microspingus Taczanowski, 1874	Buff-throated warbling finch – Microspingus lateralis; Grey-throated warbling finch – Microspingus cabanisi; Rusty-browed warbling finch – Microspingus erythrophrys; Plain-tailed warbling finch – Microspingus alticola; Ringed warbling finch – Microspingus torquatus; Three-striped hemispingus – Microspingus trifasciatus; Black-capped warbling finch – Microspingus melanoleucus; Cinereous warbling finch – Microspingus cinereus

==== Diglossinae ====
This is a morphologically diverse group that includes seed-eaters (Nesospiza, Sicalis, Catamenia, Haplospiza), arthropod feeders (Conirostrum), a bamboo specialist (Acanthidops), an aphid feeder (Xenodacnis), and boulder field specialists (Idiopsar). Many species live at high altitudes. Conirostrum was previously placed in Parulidae, Diglossa was placed in Thraupidae, and the remaining genera were placed in Emberizidae.

Image	Genus	Species
	Conirostrum d'Orbigny & Lafresnaye, 1838	Chestnut-vented conebill – Conirostrum speciosum; White-eared conebill – Conirostrum leucogenys; Bicolored conebill – Conirostrum bicolor; Pearly-breasted conebill – Conirostrum margaritae; Cinereous conebill – Conirostrum cinereum; Tamarugo conebill – Conirostrum tamarugense; White-browed conebill – Conirostrum ferrugineiventre; Rufous-browed conebill – Conirostrum rufum; Blue-backed conebill – Conirostrum sitticolor; Capped conebill – Conirostrum albifrons; Giant conebill – Conirostrum binghami (formerly Oreomanes fraseri)
	Sicalis F. Boie, 1828	13 species: Stripe-tailed yellow finch – Sicalis citrina; Sulphur-throated finch – Sicalis taczanowskii; Bright-rumped yellow finch – Sicalis uropygialis; Saffron finch – Sicalis flaveola; Orange-fronted yellow finch – Sicalis columbiana; Grassland yellow finch – Sicalis luteola; Citron-headed yellow finch – Sicalis luteocephala; Patagonian yellow finch – Sicalis lebruni; Greenish yellow finch – Sicalis olivascens; Monte yellow finch – Sicalis mendozae; Greater yellow finch – Sicalis auriventris; Raimondi's yellow finch – Sicalis raimondii; Puna yellow finch – Sicalis lutea
	Phrygilus Cabanis, 1844	Black-hooded sierra finch – Phrygilus atriceps; Peruvian sierra finch – Phrygilus punensis; Grey-hooded sierra finch – Phrygilus gayi; Patagonian sierra finch – Phrygilus patagonicus
	Nesospiza Cabanis, 1873	Inaccessible Island finch – Nesospiza acunhae; Nightingale Island finch – Nesospiza questi; Wilkins's finch – Nesospiza wilkinsi
	Rowettia Lowe, 1923	Gough finch – Rowettia goughensis
	Melanodera Bonaparte, 1850	White-bridled finch – Melanodera melanodera; Yellow-bridled finch – Melanodera xanthogramma
	Geospizopsis Bonaparte, 1856	Plumbeous sierra finch – Geospizopsis unicolor; Ash-breasted sierra finch – Geospizopsis plebejus
	Haplospiza Cabanis, 1851	Slaty finch – Haplospiza rustica; Uniform finch – Haplospiza unicolor
	Acanthidops Ridgway, 1882	Peg-billed finch – Acanthidops bairdi
	Xenodacnis Cabanis, 1873	Tit-like dacnis – Xenodacnis parina; Streaked dacnis – Xenodacnis petersi
	Idiopsar Cassin, 1867	Red-backed sierra finch – Idiopsar dorsalis; White-throated sierra finch – Idiopsar erythronotus; Glacier finch – Idiopsar speculifer; Boulder finch – Idiopsar brachyurus
	Catamenia Bonaparte, 1850	Band-tailed seedeater – Catamenia analis; Plain-colored seedeater – Catamenia inornata; Paramo seedeater – Catamenia homochroa
	Diglossa Wagler, 1832	18 species: Golden-eyed flowerpiercer – Diglossa glauca; Bluish flowerpiercer – Diglossa caerulescens; Masked flowerpiercer – Diglossa cyanea; Indigo flowerpiercer – Diglossa indigotica; Rusty flowerpiercer – Diglossa sittoides; Slaty flowerpiercer – Diglossa plumbea; Cinnamon-bellied flowerpiercer – Diglossa baritula; Moustached flowerpiercer – Diglossa mystacalis; Glossy flowerpiercer – Diglossa lafresnayii; Chestnut-bellied flowerpiercer – Diglossa gloriosissima; Scaled flowerpiercer – Diglossa duidae; Greater flowerpiercer – Diglossa major; Venezuelan flowerpiercer – Diglossa venezuelensis; White-sided flowerpiercer – Diglossa albilatera; Grey-bellied flowerpiercer – Diglossa carbonaria; Black-throated flowerpiercer, Diglossa brunneiventris; Mérida flowerpiercer – Diglossa gloriosa; Black flowerpiercer – Diglossa humeralis

==== Thraupinae ====
Typical tanagers.

Image	Genus	Species
	Calochaetes Sclater, PL, 1879	Vermilion tanager – Calochaetes coccineus
	Iridosornis Lesson, 1844	Purplish-mantled tanager – Iridosornis porphyrocephalus; Yellow-throated tanager – Iridosornis analis; Golden-collared tanager – Iridosornis jelskii; Golden-crowned tanager – Iridosornis rufivertex; Yellow-scarfed tanager – Iridosornis reinhardti
	Rauenia Wolters, 1980	Blue-and-yellow tanager – Rauenia bonariensis
	Pipraeidea Swainson, 1827	Fawn-breasted tanager – Pipraeidea melanonota
	Pseudosaltator K.J. Burns, Unitt & N.A. Mason, 2016	Rufous-bellied mountain tanager – Pseudosaltator rufiventris
	Dubusia Bonaparte, 1850	Buff-breasted mountain tanager – Dubusia taeniata; Carriker's mountain tanager – Dubusia carrikeri; Streak-crowned mountain tanager – Dubusia stictocephala; Chestnut-bellied mountain tanager – Dubusia castaneoventris
	Buthraupis Cabanis, 1851	Hooded mountain tanager – Buthraupis montana
	Sporathraupis Ridgway, 1898	Blue-capped tanager – Sporathraupis cyanocephala
	Tephrophilus R. T. Moore, 1934	Masked mountain tanager – Tephrophilus wetmorei
	Chlorornis Reichenbach, 1850	Grass-green tanager – Chlorornis riefferii
	Cnemathraupis Penard, 1919	Black-chested mountain tanager – Cnemathraupis eximia; Golden-backed mountain tanager – Cnemathraupis aureodorsalis
	Anisognathus Reichenbach, 1850	Santa Marta mountain tanager – Anisognathus melanogenys; Lacrimose mountain tanager – Anisognathus lacrymosus; Scarlet-bellied mountain tanager – Anisognathus igniventris; Blue-winged mountain tanager – Anisognathus somptuosus; Black-chinned mountain tanager – Anisognathus notabilis
	Chlorochrysa Bonaparte, 1851	Glistening-green tanager – Chlorochrysa phoenicotis; Orange-eared tanager – Chlorochrysa calliparaea; Multicoloured tanager – Chlorochrysa nitidissima
	Wetmorethraupis Lowery & O'Neill, 1964	Orange-throated tanager – Wetmorethraupis sterrhopteron
	Bangsia Penard, 1919	Blue-and-gold tanager – Bangsia arcaei; Black-and-gold tanager – Bangsia melanochlamys; Golden-chested tanager – Bangsia rothschildi; Moss-backed tanager – Bangsia edwardsi; Gold-ringed tanager – Bangsia aureocincta; Yellow-green tanager – Bangsia flavovirens
	Lophospingus Cabanis, 1878	Grey-crested finch – Lophospingus griseocristatus; Black-crested finch – Lophospingus pusillus
	Neothraupis Hellmayr, 1936	Shrike-like tanager – Neothraupis fasciata
	Diuca Reichenbach, 1850	Diuca finch – Diuca diuca
	Gubernatrix Lesson, 1837	Yellow cardinal – Gubernatrix cristata
	Stephanophorus Strickland, 1841	Diademed tanager – Stephanophorus diadematus
	Cissopis Vieillot, 1816	Magpie tanager – Cissopis leverianus
	Schistochlamys Reichenbach, 1850	Cinnamon tanager – Schistochlamys ruficapillus; Black-faced tanager – Schistochlamys melanopis
	Paroaria Bonaparte, 1832	Red-crested cardinal – Paroaria coronata; Red-cowled cardinal – Paroaria dominicana; Red-capped cardinal – Paroaria gularis; Masked cardinal – Paroaria nigrogenis; Crimson-fronted cardinal – Paroaria baeri; Yellow-billed cardinal – Paroaria capitata
	Ixothraupis Bonaparte, 1851	Dotted tanager – Ixothraupis varia; Rufous-throated tanager – Ixothraupis rufigula; Spotted tanager – Ixothraupis punctata; Speckled tanager – Ixothraupis guttata; Yellow-bellied tanager – Ixothraupis xanthogastra
	Chalcothraupis Bonaparte, 1851	Golden-naped tanager – Chalcothraupis ruficervix
	Poecilostreptus Burns, KJ, Unitt, & Mason, NA, 2016	Azure-rumped tanager – Poecilostreptus cabanisi; Grey-and-gold tanager – Poecilostreptus palmeri
	Thraupis F. Boie, 1826	Blue-grey tanager – Thraupis episcopus; Glaucous tanager – Thraupis glaucocolpa; Sayaca tanager – Thraupis sayaca; Azure-shouldered tanager – Thraupis cyanoptera; Golden-chevroned tanager – Thraupis ornata; Blue-capped tanager – Thraupis cyanocephala; Blue-and-yellow tanager – Thraupis bonariensis; Darwin's tanager – T. b. darwinii; Yellow-winged tanager – Thraupis abbas; Palm tanager – Thraupis palmarum
	Stilpnia Burns, KJ, Unitt, & Mason, NA, 2016	15 species: Black-headed tanager – Stilpnia cyanoptera; Black-hooded tanager – Stilpnia whitelyi; Silver-backed tanager – Stilpnia viridicollis; Sira tanager – Stilpnia phillipsi; Straw-backed tanager – Stilpnia argyrofenges; Black-capped tanager – Stilpnia heinei; Golden-hooded tanager – Stilpnia larvata; Blue-necked tanager – Stilpnia cyanicollis; Masked tanager – Stilpnia nigrocincta; Black-backed tanager – Stilpnia peruviana; Chestnut-backed tanager – Stilpnia preciosa; Green-capped tanager – Stilpnia meyerdeschauenseei; Scrub tanager – Stilpnia vitriolina; Burnished-buff tanager – Stilpnia cayana; Lesser Antillean tanager – Stilpnia cucullata
	Tangara Brisson, 1760	28 species: Blue-and-black tanager – Tangara vassorii; Beryl-spangled tanager – Tangara nigroviridis; Spangle-cheeked tanager – Tangara dowii; Green-naped tanager – Tangara fucosa; Blue-browed tanager – Tangara cyanotis; Rufous-cheeked tanager – Tangara rufigenis; Metallic-green tanager – Tangara labradorides; Bay-headed tanager – Tangara gyrola; Rufous-throated tanager – Tangara rufigula; Golden-eared tanager – Tangara chrysotis; Saffron-crowned tanager – Tangara xanthocephala; Flame-faced tanager – Tangara parzudakii; Blue-whiskered tanager – Tangara johannae; Green-and-gold tanager – Tangara schrankii; Golden tanager – Tangara arthus; Emerald tanager – Tangara florida; Silver-throated tanager – Tangara icterocephala; Seven-coloured tanager – Tangara fastuosa; Green-headed tanager – Tangara seledon; Red-necked tanager – Tangara cyanocephala; Brassy-breasted tanager – Tangara desmaresti; Gilt-edged tanager – Tangara cyanoventris; Plain-coloured tanager – Tangara inornata; Turquoise tanager – Tangara mexicana; White-bellied tanager – Tangara brasiliensis; Paradise tanager – Tangara chilensis; Opal-crowned tanager – Tangara callophrys; Opal-rumped tanager – Tangara velia

=== Genera formerly placed in Thraupidae ===
Passerellidae – New World sparrows

- Chlorospingus – eight species - bush-tanagers
- Oreothraupis – tanager finch

Cardinalidae – cardinals

- Piranga – 9 species - northern tanagers
- Habia – five species - ant-tanagers or habias
- Chlorothraupis – three species
- Amaurospiza – four species

Fringillidae – subfamily Euphoniinae

- Euphonia – 27 species
- Chlorophonia – five species

Phaenicophilidae – Hispaniolan tanagers

- Microligea – green-tailed warbler
- Xenoligea – white-winged warbler
- Phaenicophilus – two species

Mitrospingidae – Mitrospingid tanagers

- Mitrospingus – two species
- Orthogonys – olive-green tanager
- Lamprospiza – red-billed pied tanager

Nesospingidae

- Nesospingus – Puerto Rican tanager

Spindalidae

- Spindalis – four species - spindalises

Calyptophilidae

- Calyptophilus – two species - chat-tanagers

Rhodinocichlidae

- Rhodinocichla – rosy thrush-tanager
