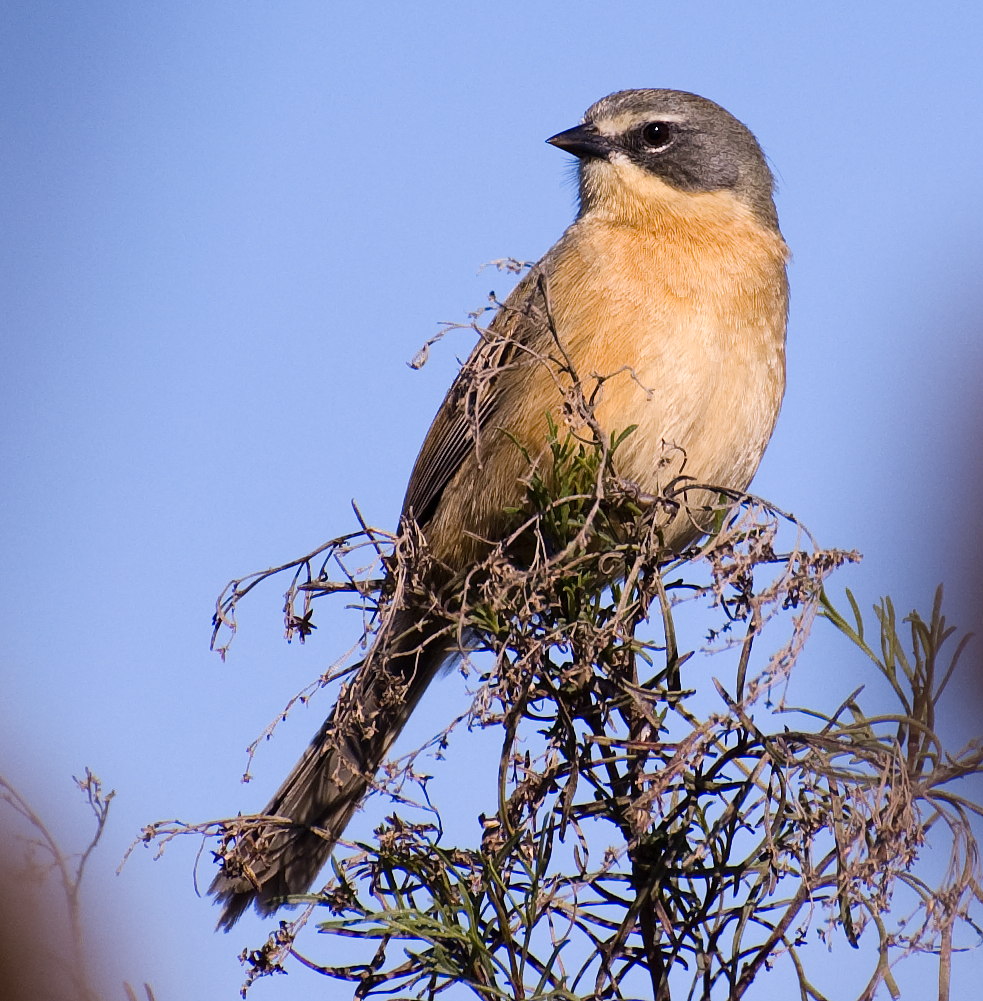

Conservation status
- Least Concern (IUCN 3.1)

Scientific classification
- Kingdom: Animalia
- Phylum: Chordata
- Class: Aves
- Order: Passeriformes
- Family: Thraupidae
- Genus: Donacospiza; Cabanis, 1851
- Species: D. albifrons

Binomial name
- Donacospiza albifrons (Vieillot, 1817)

= Long-tailed reed finch =

Species of bird

The long-tailed reed finch (Donacospiza albifrons) is a species of South American bird in the tanager family Thraupidae. It is the only member of its genus Donacospiza.

It is found in Argentina, Bolivia, Brazil, Paraguay, and Uruguay. Its natural habitats are temperate grassland, subtropical or tropical seasonally wet or flooded lowland grassland, and swamps.

== Taxonomy ==
The long-tailed reed finch was formally described in 1817 by the French ornithologist Louis Pierre Vieillot under the binomial name Sylvia albifrons. Vieillot based his description on the Cola Aguda del Vientre de Canela that had been described by the Spanish naturalist Félix de Azara in 1805 based on a specimen obtained in Paraguay. The long-tailed reed finch is now the only member of the genus Donacospiza that was introduced in 1851 by the German ornithologist Jean Cabanis. The genus name combines the Ancient Greek donax meaning "reed" or "cane" with spiza meaning "finch". The specific epithet combines the Latin albus meaning "white" with frons meaning "forehead" or "front". The species is monotypic: no subspecies are recognised.
