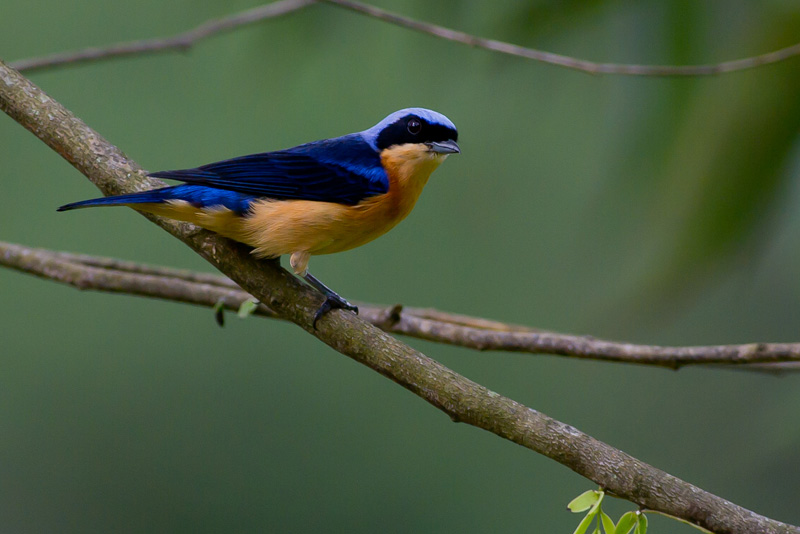

Conservation status
- Least Concern (IUCN 3.1)

Scientific classification
- Kingdom: Animalia
- Phylum: Chordata
- Class: Aves
- Order: Passeriformes
- Family: Thraupidae
- Genus: Pipraeidea; Swainson, 1827
- Species: P. melanonota

Binomial name
- Pipraeidea melanonota (Vieillot, 1819)

= Fawn-breasted tanager =

Species of bird

The fawn-breasted tanager (Pipraeidea melanonota) is a species of tanager with a blue head and yellow breast. It occurs in the Andes of northwestern Argentina, Bolivia, Colombia, Ecuador, Peru, and Venezuela, as well as in the highlands of northeastern Argentina, south Brazil, Paraguay, and Uruguay.

== Taxonomy ==
The fawn-breasted tanager was described in 1819 by the French ornithologist Louis Pierre Vieillot from a specimen obtained in Brazil. He coined the binomial name Tangara melanonota. The specific name melanonota is from the Ancient Greek melas "black" and nōtos "back". The current genus Pipraeidea was introduced by the English naturalist William Swainson in 1827. The name combines the genus Pipra which had been introduced by Carl Linnaeus in 1764 with the Ancient Greek eidos meaning "form" or "likeness".

Recent DNA evidence places this species as closely related probable relation to the blue-and-yellow tanager.

Two subspecies are currently recognized:

- P. m. melanonota (Vieillot, 1819), the nominate subspecies, inhabits open areas (forest borders and fields) in southeastern Brazil, eastern Paraguay, and northeastern Argentina south to Punta Indio.
- P. m. venezuelensis (Sclater, PL, 1857) inhabits Andean slopes or proximal areas in Venezuela, Colombia, Ecuador, Peru, Bolivia, and northeastern Argentina.

== Description ==
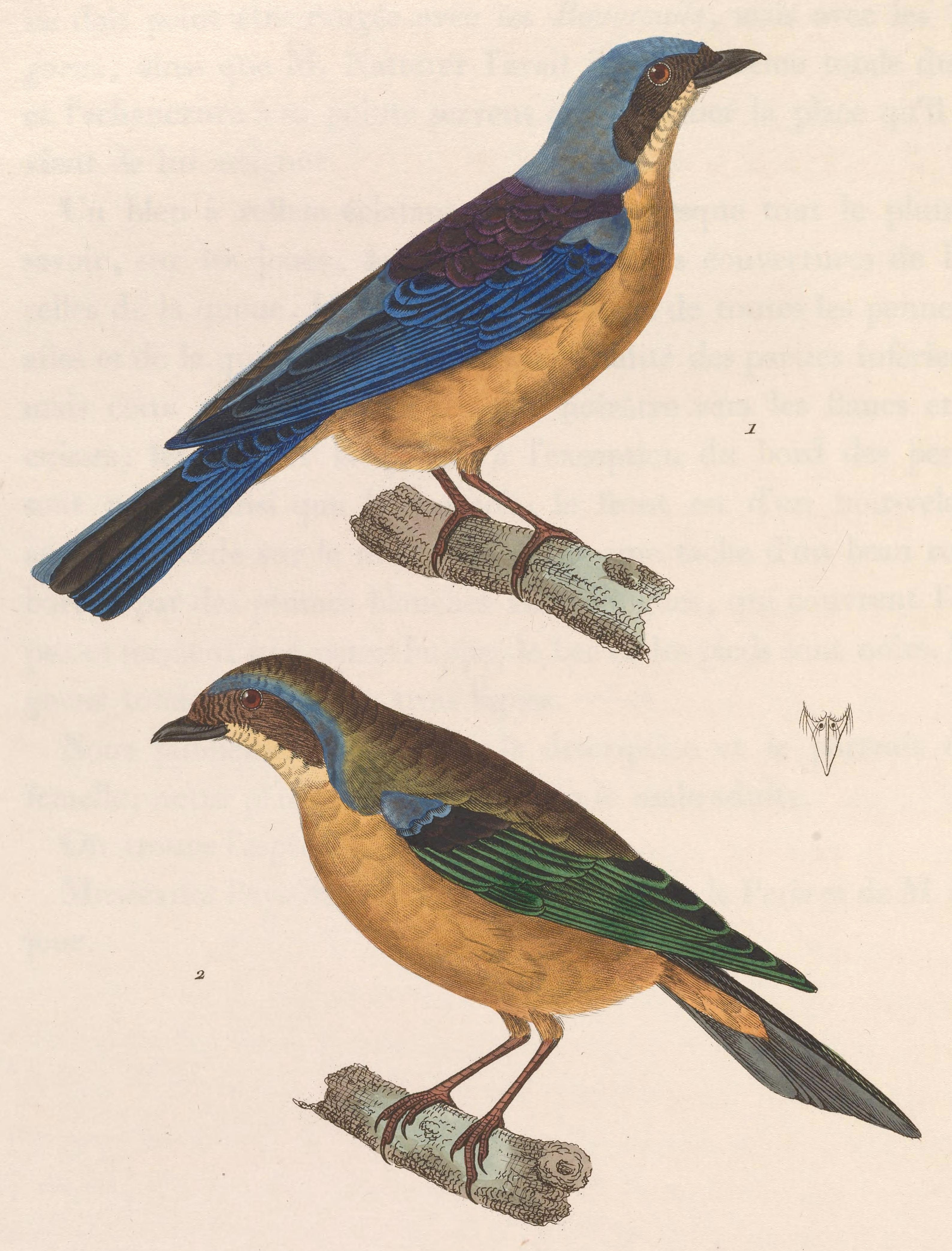
Male and female fawn-brested tanager

The fawn-breasted tanager has an average body length of 14 cm (5.5 in) and can weigh 18–25 g (0.63–0.88 oz). This species of tanager has an unusually short, wide beak, similar to the beaks of swallows, as well as short legs and tail, and long wings. The most noticeable coloration of this species is its sky-blue crown and broad black mask that extends over the eyes into ear-coverts. The coloration of the male crown and nape is a medium blue, and the forehead, lores, ocular area, and ear-coverts are deep black. The mantle and back of males are a dull blue color, the lower back and rump a bright turquoise-blue, tail dusky blue, and the throat and the underparts of the body are a cinnamon color. The iris is a dark red to reddish-brown color, and the bill is dusky with a lower mandible that is normally grey. The female has a similar coloration but is usually duller, particularly in the crown region, and with a brownish coloration on the back. Juveniles are almost without pattern and have a dull brownish-grey coloring. The fawn-breasted tanager is usually seen singly or in pairs, most often in the semi-open, but it may perch at any height.

Calls consist of "see" or "swee" tones varying in sets of 4 or 5 notes sung slowly, or a higher number of notes, around a dozen, uttered in a pulsating trill pattern in a faster rhythm.

== Habitat and distribution ==
The range of the fawn-breasted tanager extends throughout South America, covering most of Brazil, Venezuela, Colombia, Peru, Ecuador, Bolivia, east Paraguay, Uruguay, and northeastern Argentina, following towards the southern bank of the Río de la Plata. The species can be found in habitats along forest borders, bushy pastures, and cultivated small semi open areas with large trees and clearings with scattered trees. The elevation range that this species can tolerate varies geographically. In the Andes and Ecuador it can be found at altitudes of 1500–2500 m, with a maximum of 3000 m. In Colombia, it occurs down to 900 m, and in Venezuela to 400 m.

== Diet ==
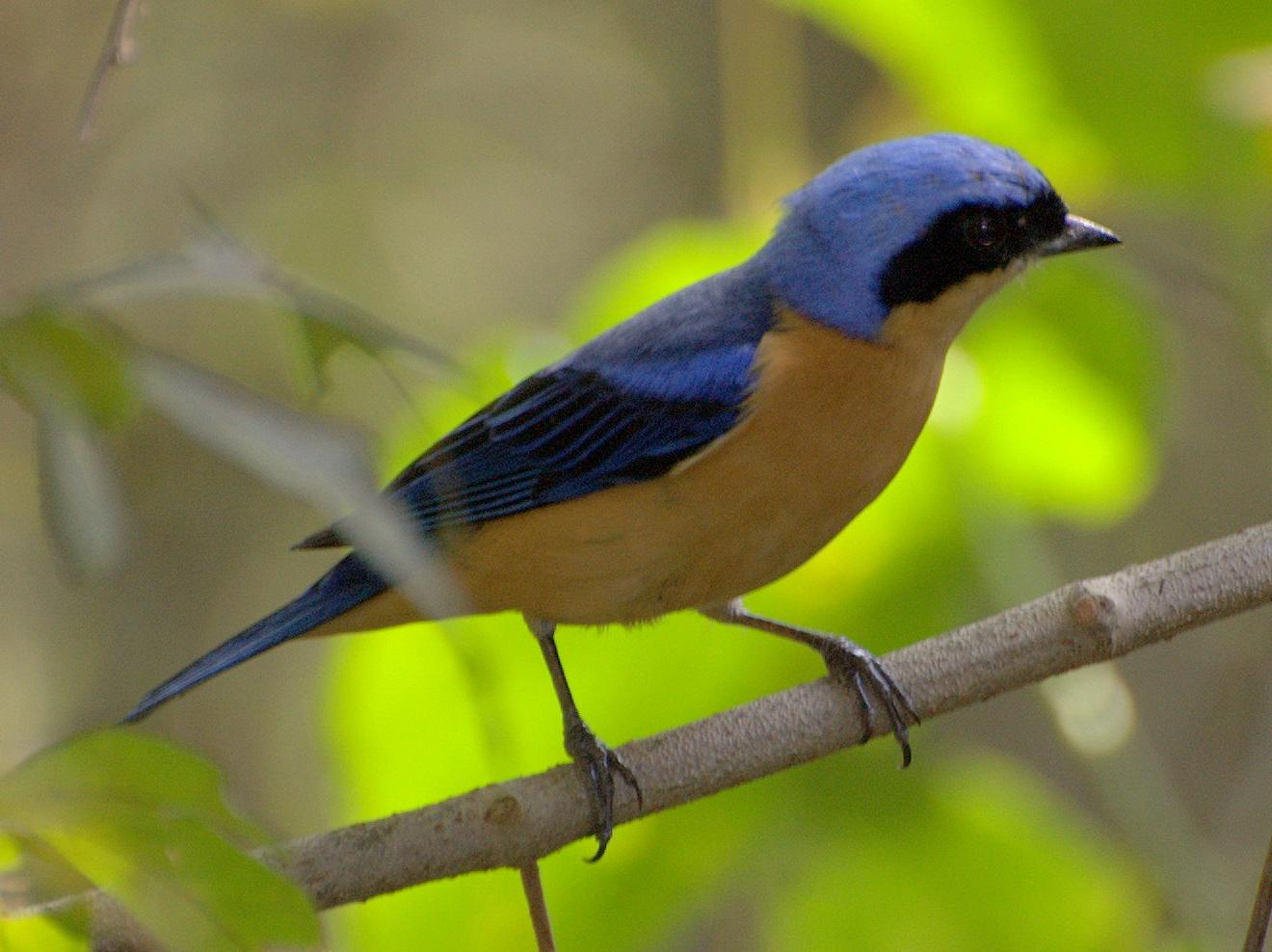

The species has a mixed diet which includes vegetable matter such as berries, fruit pulp, buds, flowers, and seeds, as well as insects such as moths, butterflies, and larvae. It may form part of mixed species flocks and has been known to congregate at fruiting trees with other birds, but generally feeds alone.

== Movement and breeding ==
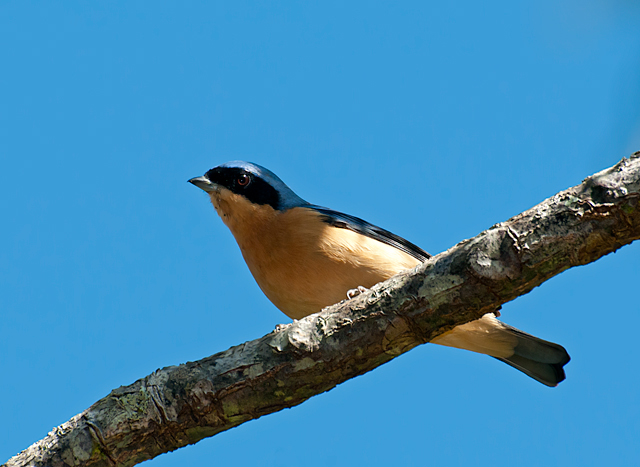

The fawn-breasted tanager engages in seasonal migration. It can be found in northern Venezuela during the months of January through June, the presumed breeding period for this species. It is present in Pacific Colombia during November through March. The populations located in southern regions, such as those located in Southern Argentina may migrate to more northern localities during the coldest months.

The species constructs well-lined cup-shaped nests, composed of moss, sticks, grass, straw fragments, and colored threads, in forest borders on the edge of pine branches, 15–20 m (49–66 ft) from the ground. The nests are concealed with epiphytes and mosses. Information on specific breeding patterns is limited, but it is known that females lay 2-3 eggs and incubate them for 12–14 days, and that nestlings remain in the nest for 18–22 days.

== Conservation ==
The species is currently classified as Least Concern by the IUCN due to its extremely large range, variety of habitats, and apparently large population size. Due to opening of forested areas through agriculture and other anthropogenic changes, it may be expanding its range locally.
