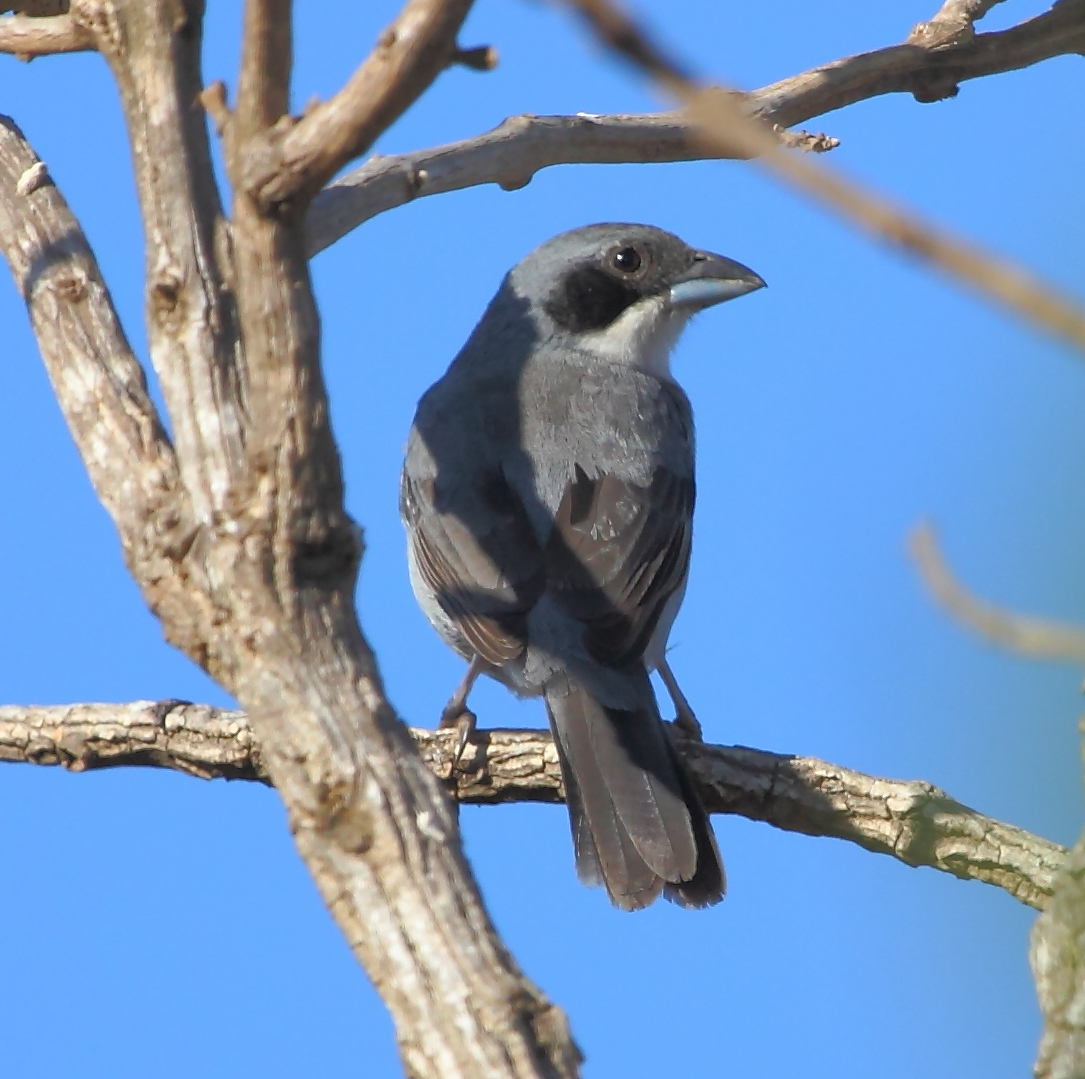
- at Alto Paraíso de Goiás, Goiás state, Brazil

Conservation status
- Near Threatened (IUCN 3.1)

Scientific classification
- Kingdom: Animalia
- Phylum: Chordata
- Class: Aves
- Order: Passeriformes
- Family: Thraupidae
- Genus: Neothraupis; Hellmayr, 1936
- Species: N. fasciata

Binomial name
- Neothraupis fasciata (Lichtenstein, MHC, 1823)

= Shrike-like tanager =

Species of bird

The shrike-like tanager (Neothraupis fasciata), also known as the white-banded tanager, is a South American bird in the tanager family Thraupidae. It is the only member of the genus Neothraupis.

== Taxonomy ==
The shrike-like tanager was formally described in 1823 by the German naturalist Hinrich Lichtenstein under the binomial name Tanagra fasciata. The species is now the only member of the genus Neothraupis that was introduced in 1936 by the Austrian ornithologist Carl Eduard Hellmayr. The genus name combines the Ancient Greek neos meaning "new" and thraupis, the word for an unknown small bird, perhaps some form of finch. The specific epithet is from the Late Latin fasciatus meaning "banded". The shrike-like tanager is monotypic: no subspecies are recognised.

== Description ==
The plumage of the shrike-like tanager is remarkably similar to that of several species of shrikes in the genus Lanius, but these Corvoidea are quite distantly related songbirds. Males and females of this species look alike. It has a total length of about 16 cm (6 1/4 in) and weighs 29–32 g.

== Distribution and habitat ==
It is a bird native to the interior of south-central South America at elevations of 550–1,100 m (1,800–3,610 ft). It is restricted to Cerrado, woodland and shrub of central-eastern Brazil, north-eastern Paraguay and north-eastern Bolivia. It is frequently seen in Chapada dos Guimarães, Mato Grosso, Brazil.

== Behaviour ==
Typically seen in pairs or small groups of up to 12 individuals, with 7 being average. Eats insects. Breeds in October and November. The deep, cup-shaped nest, typically placed in a small tree or bush, is lined with grasses. Clutch size 2–3 eggs. The pair are often helped by birds from earlier broods, which have the grey parts of the plumage partially or entirely replaced by brown (this brownish plumage sometimes mistakenly referred to as the adult female plumage).

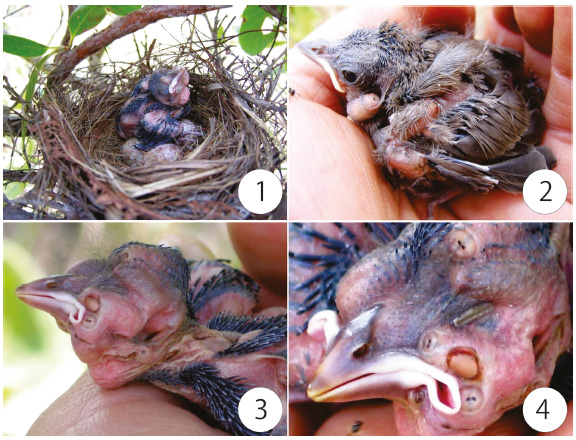
Nest of Neothraupis fasciata with parasitized nestlings by Philornis torquans.
