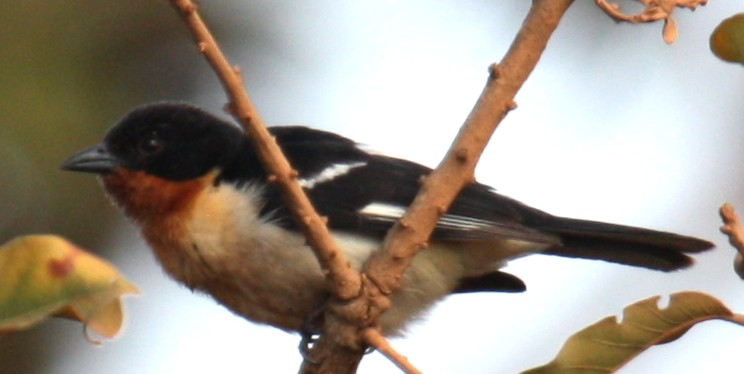

Conservation status
- Least Concern (IUCN 3.1)

Scientific classification
- Kingdom: Animalia
- Phylum: Chordata
- Class: Aves
- Order: Passeriformes
- Family: Thraupidae
- Genus: Cypsnagra; Lesson, R, 1831
- Species: C. hirundinacea

Binomial name
- Cypsnagra hirundinacea (Lesson, R, 1831)

= White-rumped tanager =

Species of bird

The white-rumped tanager (Cypsnagra hirundinacea) is a South American bird in the tanager family Thraupidae. It is the only member of the genus Cypsnagra.

The length is 16 cm (6.3 in) with a weight of 25–34 g (0.88–1.20 oz). They occur mostly in Brazil, and also in Paraguay, Bolivia, and Suriname at an elevation of 700–1,000 m (2,300–3,300 ft). They inhabit grasslands with few trees. In Brazil, they are found in territorial groups of three to six individuals. They eat insects on the ground in the grass or catch them in flight (sallying). Their diet mostly consists of beetles, crickets, and grasshoppers but they occasionally eat fruit. The cup shaped nests are placed only 1–2 metres (3–7 ft) off the ground and are made of woven grasses. The clutch is 3–4 blue eggs which are speckled around the large end with brown or black spots. Helpers born the previous season help the mating pair tend the nest and nestlings.

== Taxonomy ==
The taxonomy is a little complicated. The white-rumped tanager was formally described in 1823 by German naturalist Hinrich Lichtenstein under the binomial name Tanagra ruficollis. Unfortunately, this combination had been used in 1789 by German naturalist Johann Friedrich Gmelin for what is now a subspecies of the Greater Antillean bullfinch with the trinomial Melopyrrha violacea ruficollis. In 1831 the French naturalist René Lesson described the white-rumped tanager and introduced the name Cypsnagra (as a subgenus) and the binomial name Tanagra hirundinacea. The type location is Franca in the state of São Paulo in Brazil. The genus name Cypsnagra is a mixture of the Ancient Greek kupselos meaning "swallow" and the genus name Tanagra. The specific epithet is from Modern Latin hirundinaceus meaning "swallow-like".

Two subspecies are recognised:

- C. h. pallidigula Hellmayr, 1907 – Suriname, French Guiana, northeast Bolivia to east central Brazil
- C. h. hirundinacea (Lesson, R, 1831) – east Bolivia, Paraguay and south Brazil
