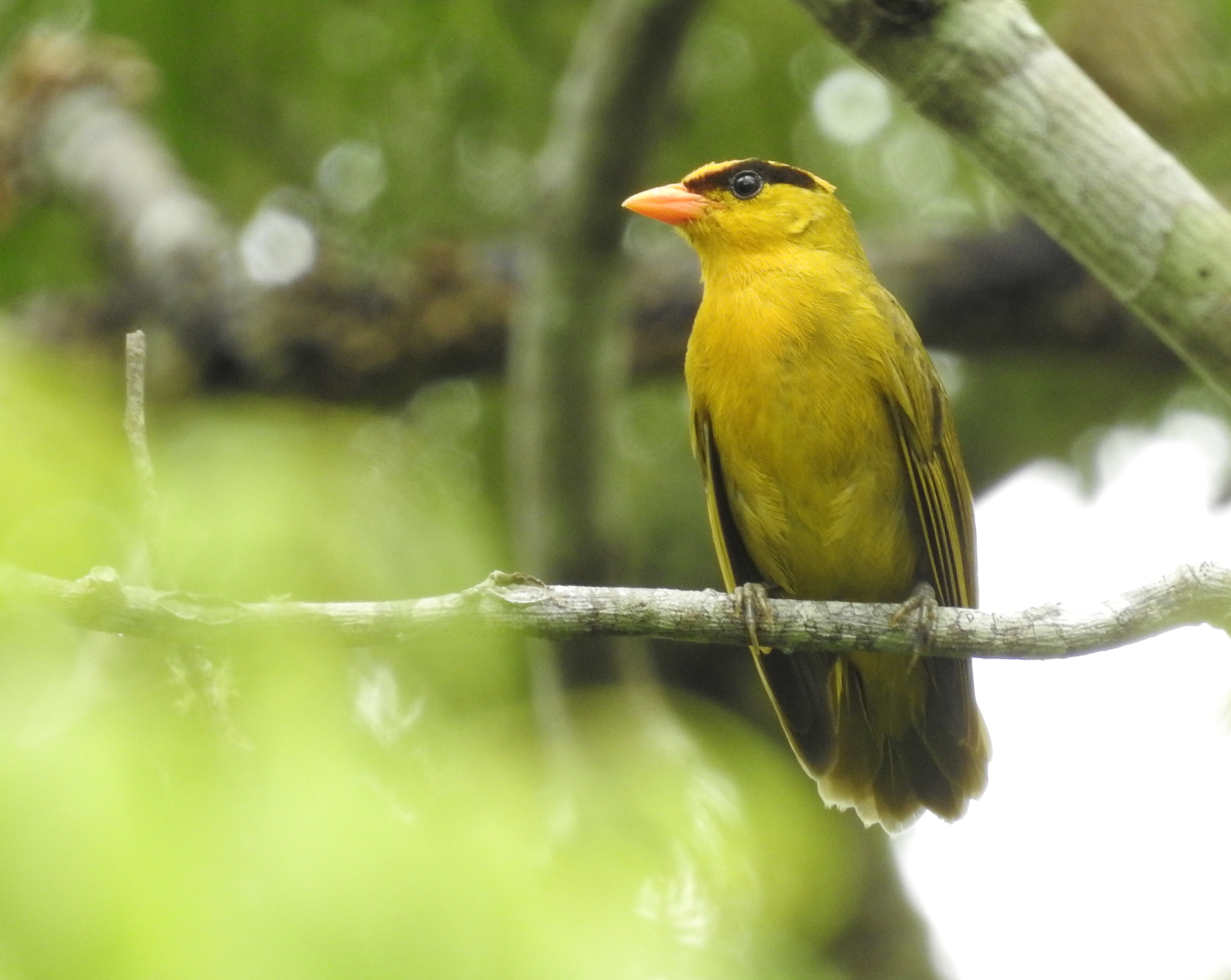

Conservation status
- Least Concern (IUCN 3.1)

Scientific classification
- Kingdom: Animalia
- Phylum: Chordata
- Class: Aves
- Order: Passeriformes
- Family: Thraupidae
- Genus: Heliothraupis; Lane, Burns, KJ, Klicka & Price-Waldman, 2021
- Species: H. oneilli

Binomial name
- Heliothraupis oneilli Lane, Aponte, Rheindt, Rosenberg, GH, Schmitt, CJ & Terrill, 2021
- Breeding Non-breeding

= Inti tanager =

Species of bird

The Inti tanager (Heliothraupis oneilli), also known as the San Pedro tanager, is a species of bird in the family Thraupidae. It is the only member of the genus Heliothraupis. It is restricted to the lower Yungas of western Bolivia and southern Peru. Despite its striking coloration, call, and evolutionary distinctiveness, it was only described in 2021, and the bird's discovery and documentation to Western science only occurred during the prior two decades. On January 31, 2022, the South American Classification Committee of the American Ornithological Society (SACC) announced its formal addition to their South American species list.

== Taxonomy ==
The first proper observation of this species was made in 2000, when it was discovered in its nonbreeding habitat on a birding tour along the Kosñipata Road in Cuzco department, Peru. Individuals were sighted again in 2003 and 2004 in the same area. Little of the bird's natural history was known until December 2011, when a breeding population of tanagers was discovered in La Paz department, Bolivia. The species was studied at this site over the following decade, and finally described in 2021.

The Inti tanager is thought to be closely related to the black-goggled tanager (Trichothraupis melanops), to which it is the sister species; however, due to its distinctive plumage, it was classified in a different genus from Trichothraupis. The grey-headed tanager (Eucometis penicillata) is thought to be sister to the clade comprising both.

The species is named after the Incan sun god Inti, as a reference to its bright yellow plumage and its tendency to sing late into the morning when the sun is higher in the sky. The specific epithet references renowned ornithologist John P. O'Neill, who had previously described the orange-throated tanager (Wetmorethraupis sterrhopteron), another monotypic genus of Peruvian tanager. Prior to its description, it was referred to as the San Pedro tanager or "Kill Bill tanager", the latter being a reference to Uma Thurman's yellow jumpsuit in the 2003 movie Kill Bill.

Its distinctive appearance and the monotypic status of its genus, which was recognized as soon as it was being studied, makes it unique among other recently-described birds, most of which are cryptic species and closely related to previously-described bird species.

== Distribution and habitat ==
Unusually for tanagers, this species is a migratory one, breeding in the Machariapo Valley north of Apolo, Bolivia, and having a much wider nonbreeding range on the eastern slope of the Andes in southern Peru. Despite its elusiveness and being described only recently, its nonbreeding range includes the region around the Kosñipata Road, which borders Manu National Park and is one of the ornithologically best-studied sites in Peru.

This species breeds in semi-deciduous forests, and likely depends on bamboo and bamboo-like grasses, such as those of the genus Guadua, for optimal breeding conditions. In its nonbreeding range it is thought to inhabit the transition between rainforest and cloud forest, and it has also been seen at patches of Guadua bamboo here.

== Description ==
This is a brightly colored bird with yellow plumage in both sexes, a black supercilium, and a salmon-colored bill. Male birds display a short, bushy crest that can be either raised or flattened. The yellow underwing coverts are unique among the Thraupidae. Morphologically, this bird resembles members of both Cardinalidae and Thraupidae, and only genetic analysis proved that it belonged with the latter.

== Behavior ==
This species has a loud and distinctive song made by both females and males. This singing usually begins late in the morning, well after the dawn chorus of most other birds has finished, and lasts well into the heat of the day when most other birds have stopped calling.

This species is thought to be highly elusive in spite of its distinctive appearance and calls, which is why so few surveys have detected it until recent years.

== Conservation ==
Despite being little-known, this species' habitat has been disturbed little by human activity and large amounts of its habitat are inaccessible to humans, so it is not thought to currently be seriously threatened. However, potential plans by China to build a road between Cuzco and La Paz may bring large amounts of colonizers, which could lead to deforestation in breeding habitat. However, it has been recommended that the species be classified as Data Deficient due to the lack of info on population size, trends, and distribution.

== See also ==
- List of bird species described in the 2020s
