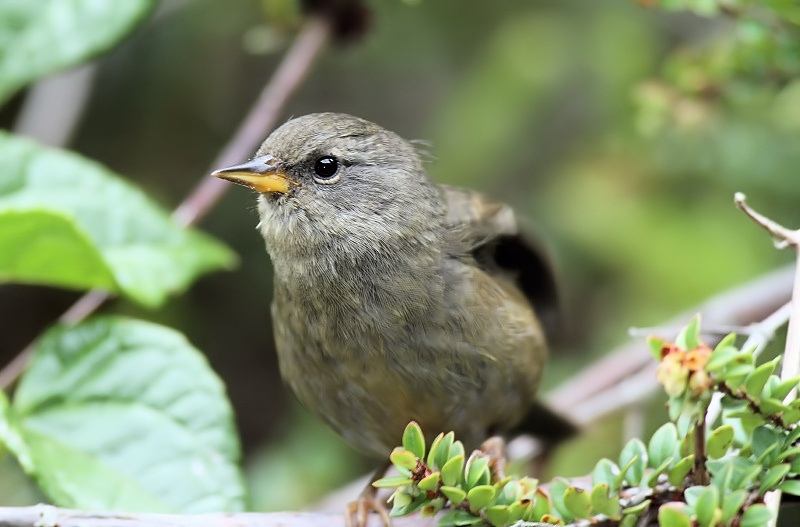

Conservation status
- Least Concern (IUCN 3.1)

Scientific classification
- Kingdom: Animalia
- Phylum: Chordata
- Class: Aves
- Order: Passeriformes
- Family: Thraupidae
- Genus: Acanthidops; Ridgway, 1882
- Species: A. bairdi

Binomial name
- Acanthidops bairdi Ridgway, 1882

= Peg-billed finch =

Species of bird

The peg-billed finch (Acanthidops bairdi) is a passerine bird endemic to the highlands of Costa Rica and western Panama. Despite its name, it is not a true finch, but now recognized as a member of the tanager family (Thraupidae), after being long placed in the Emberizidae. It is the only member of the genus Acanthidops. The scientific name commemorates the American ornithologist Spencer Fullerton Baird.

== Taxonomy ==
The peg-billed finch was formally described in 1882 by the American ornithologist Robert Ridgway from a specimen collected near the Irazú Volcano in Costa Rica. To accommodate the new species Ridgway introduced the genus Acanthidops and coined the binomial name Acanthidops bairdi. The genus name combines the Ancient Greek akanthis meaning "spiky" with ōps meaning "face". The specific epithet honours the American naturalist Spencer Fullerton Baird. No subspecies are recognised.

== Description ==
The peg-billed finch is a long-tailed species, 13.5 cm long and weighing 16 g. It has a distinctive long upturned bill with a black upper mandible and yellow lower mandible. The adult male is slate grey, becoming paler on the belly. The female is olive-brown above, becoming paler below and with a grey tinge to the head and upper back. She has bright cinnamon wing bars and buff supercilia. Young birds are similar to the female, but have paler plumage and weaker wing bars.

It has a dry pzeek call, and the male's song consists of high whistled notes ending with a buzz, chee shee shee shee paah.

== Habitat ==
This is an uncommon bird at the edges and clearings of mountain forests, and in scrubby second growth, bamboo clumps, and bushy pastures from 1500 m altitude to the timberline. In the wet season it can descend to 1200 m altitude. Its numbers have reported to be high when the bamboo is flowering on favoured sites such as Cerro de la Muerte.

== Behaviour ==
The finch is seen singly, in pairs, family groups or in mixed-species feeding flocks with other small birds such as warblers.

=== Breeding ===
The nest, built by the female, is a cup of plant material into which she lays typically four eggs. The female alone incubates for 12–14 days to hatching.

=== Feeding ===
It feeds on insects and spiders, grass and bamboo seeds. It will also squeeze nectar from flowers and juice from berries.

== Sources ==
- Stiles and Skutch, A guide to the birds of Costa Rica, ISBN 0-8014-9600-4
