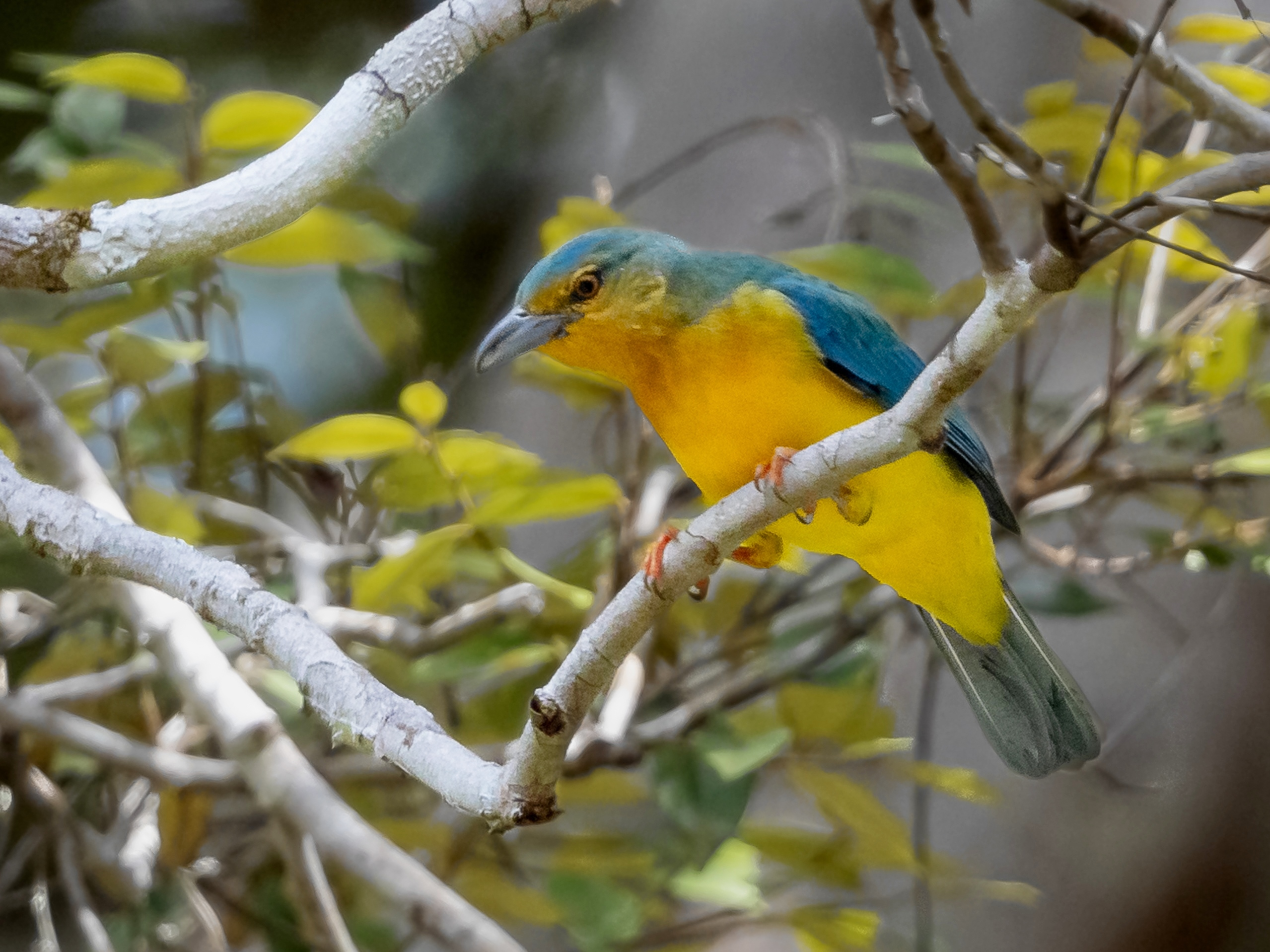

Conservation status
- Least Concern (IUCN 3.1)

Scientific classification
- Kingdom: Animalia
- Phylum: Chordata
- Class: Aves
- Order: Passeriformes
- Family: Thraupidae
- Genus: Cyanicterus; Bonaparte, 1850
- Species: C. cyanicterus

Binomial name
- Cyanicterus cyanicterus (Vieillot, 1819)

Synonyms
- Pyranga cyanicterus (protonym)

= Blue-backed tanager =

Species of bird

The blue-backed tanager (Cyanicterus cyanicterus)is a species of bird in the family Thraupidae, the tanagers and allies. It is found in Brazil, French Guiana, Guyana, Suriname, and Venezuela.

== Taxonomy and systematics ==
The blue-backed tanager was formally described in 1819 by the French ornithologist Louis Pierre Vieillot with the binomial Pyranga cyanicterus. The type locality is Cayenne in French Guiana. This species is now the only member of the genus Cyanicterus that was introduced by Charles Lucien Bonaparte in 1850. The word cyanicterus is formed from the Ancient Greek kuanos meaning "dark-blue" and ikteros meaning "jaundice-yellow". The blue-backed tanager is monotypic: No subspecies are recognized.

== Description ==
The blue-backed tanager is about 17 cm (6.7 in) long and weighs 33 to 36 g (1.2 to 1.3 oz). The species is sexually dimorphic. Adult males have black lores on an otherwise bright blue head. Their neck, upperparts, upperwing coverts, and tail are also bright blue. Their wing's flight feathers are dusky with bright cobalt-blue edges. Their throat and upper breast are violet-blue and the rest of their underparts golden-yellow with dark blue thigh feathers. Adult females have a cerulean blue crown and nape. Their upperparts and wing coverts are cerulean-blue with a greenish tinge on the back. Their face including the lores, throat, and breast are deep buffy yellow and the rest of their underparts bright yellow. Both sexes have an orange to red iris and yellowish-orange legs and feet. Their bill is long and heavy with a decurved culmen, a black maxilla, and a gray mandible.

== Distribution and habitat ==
The blue-backed tanager was long thought to be endemic to the Guiana Shield though its presence in Venezuela was not realized until 1986 from examinations of old specimens. Its range on the shield extends from far eastern Bolívar in eastern Venezuela east across the Guianas and a tiny part of extreme northern Brazil's Roraima state. Very small disjunct populations have also been documented in the Amazon Basin around Manaus, Brazil, in eastern Amazonas state and near the mouth of the Amazon in northeastern Pará.

The blue-backed tanager inhabits the interior and edges of humid forest, clearings with some tall trees in the forest, and in Brazil occasionally savanna woodland. It reaches an elevation of about 600 m (2,000 ft) in the Guianas, 200 m (700 ft) in Venezuela, and 500 m (1,600 ft) in Brazil.

== Behavior ==
=== Movement ===
The blue-backed tanager is "almost certainly resident".

=== Feeding ===
The blue-backed tanager's diet has not been studied but is known to include insects and fruit. It forages in pairs and small groups thought to be families and often joins mixed-species feeding flocks. It forages in the forest canopy and emergent treetops, hopping along branches in "a rather deliberate manner".

=== Breeding ===
Nothing is known about the blue-backed tanager's breeding biology.

=== Vocalization ===
The blue-backed tanager appears to be quite noisy. What might be its song in Venezuela is "high-pitched, loud and penetrating, mostly 2- or 3-note calls...keeee, kuuu or keeee, ksuuu-ksuuu, or various combinations, occasionally up to 5 notes in series" [emphasis in original]. In Brazil its call is described as a "very high, sharp feet-feet or feet-feet-feet".

== Status ==
The IUCN has assessed the blue-backed tanager as being of Least Concern. Its population size is not known and is believed to be decreasing. No immediate threats have been identified. It is "rare to uncommon and local" in Venezuela and there are only a few records in Amazonian Brazil. "Because this species stays very high in forest, where difficult to detect except by voice, it could perhaps be somewhat more numerous than low frequency of sightings would suggest."
