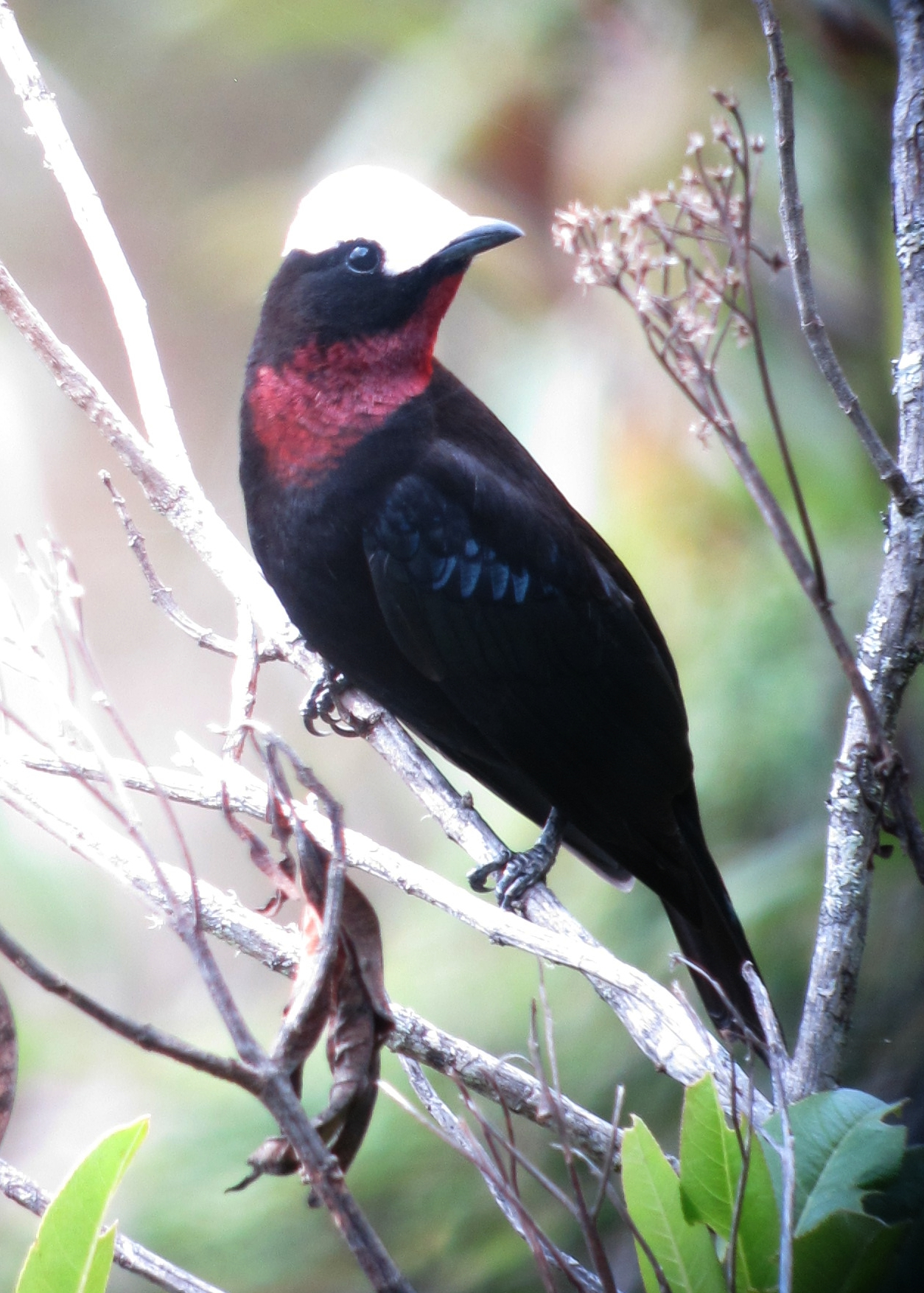

Conservation status
- Vulnerable (IUCN 3.1)

Scientific classification
- Kingdom: Animalia
- Phylum: Chordata
- Class: Aves
- Order: Passeriformes
- Family: Thraupidae
- Genus: Sericossypha; Lesson, 1844
- Species: S. albocristata

Binomial name
- Sericossypha albocristata (Lafresnaye, 1843)

= White-capped tanager =

Species of bird

The white-capped tanager (Sericossypha albocristata) is a Vulnerable species of bird in the family Thraupidae, the tanagers and allies. It is found from Venezuela to Peru.

== Taxonomy and systematics ==
The white-capped tanager was formally described in 1843 by the French ornithologist Frédéric de Lafresnaye under the Latin name Tangara (Lamprotes) albo-cristatus. The species is now the only species in the genus Sericossypha that was introduced in 1844 by René Lesson. The genus name combines the Ancient Greek sērikos meaning "silken" with kossuphos meaning "blackbird". The specific epithet albocristata is formed from the Latin albus meaning "white" with cristatus meaning "crested" or "plumed". The species is monotypic: No subspecies are recognized.

== Description ==
The white-capped tanager is the heaviest member of its family. It averages 24 cm (9.4 in) long and weighs 95 to 125 g (3.4 to 4.4 oz). The species is slightly sexually dimorphic. Adult males have pure white lores, forehead, and crown with a plush texture. Their body is mostly velvety black with a bright crimson throat and breast. Their wings and tail are glossy bluish black. Adult females are less glossy than males and have a duskier throat and breast that is almost purple. Juveniles have a buffy gray crown and only a small amount of red on their chin and upper throat.

== Distribution and habitat ==
The white-capped tanager has a disjunct distribution. It is found intermittently on the eastern slope of the Andes from extreme southern Táchira in western Venezuela south along Colombia's Eastern Andes and eastern Ecuador into Peru as far as Junín Department. It also is found in Colombia in the upper Magdalena River valley and on both slopes of the Central Andes.

The white-capped tanager inhabits the interior of humid montane forest heavy with mosses. It is found less frequently on the forest edges and secondary forest. In elevation it ranges between 1,800 and 3,000 m (5,900 and 9,800 ft) in Venezuela, between 2,000 and 3,300 m (6,600 and 10,800 ft) in Colombia, mostly between 1,900 and 2,700 m (6,200 and 8,900 ft) in Ecuador, and between 1,700 and 2,800 m (5,600 and 9,200 ft) in Peru.

== Behavior ==
=== Movement ===
The white-capped tanager is mostly a year-round resident though some seasonal movements are known in Colombia.

=== Feeding ===
The white-capped tanager's diet has not been studied but specimens' stomachs have contained a variety of larval and adult insects, seeds, and fruit, and a snail shell. It typically forages in what appear to be family groups of up to eight individuals but flocks of up to 20 are known. It seldom joins mixed-species feeding flocks but does associate with a few other species. It forages mostly near or in the forest canopy but will do so lower at the forest edge. It apparently has large foraging ranges.

=== Breeding ===
The one known white-capped tanager nest was discovered in Ecuador in January and held a well-feathered nestling. It was a frail cup woven from rootlets and other plant fibers anchored in the top of a tree fern about 12 m (40 ft) above the ground. Several adults provisioned the nestling, suggesting that the species is a cooperative breeder. Nothing else is known about the species' breeding biology.

=== Vocalization ===
The white-capped tanager is "quite noisy, with far-carrying jay-like calls...an arresting cheeeyáp! [with] other flock members following with one or more shrieking cheeyp! or peeeyr! calls". The species' calls are also described as "kip, keep, peeeaap, peeer, and peeeur".

== Status ==
The IUCN originally in 1988 assessed the white-capped tanager as being of Least Concern but since 2012 as Vulnerable. Its population size is not known and is believed to be decreasing. The species is threatened by deforestation for small-scale and industrial farming and ranching. It is considered "rare, unpredictable (local?),and low-density" in Venezuela, "uncommon and erratic" in Colombia, "scarce and infrequently encountered" in Ecuador, and "uncommon" in Peru. "Due to this species’ need for a large foraging area of montane forest, it is significantly threatened by the deforestation and fragmentation of the high-Andean forest." It is found in several protected areas along its range.

== See also ==
- Magpie tanager – the longest species in the tanager family
