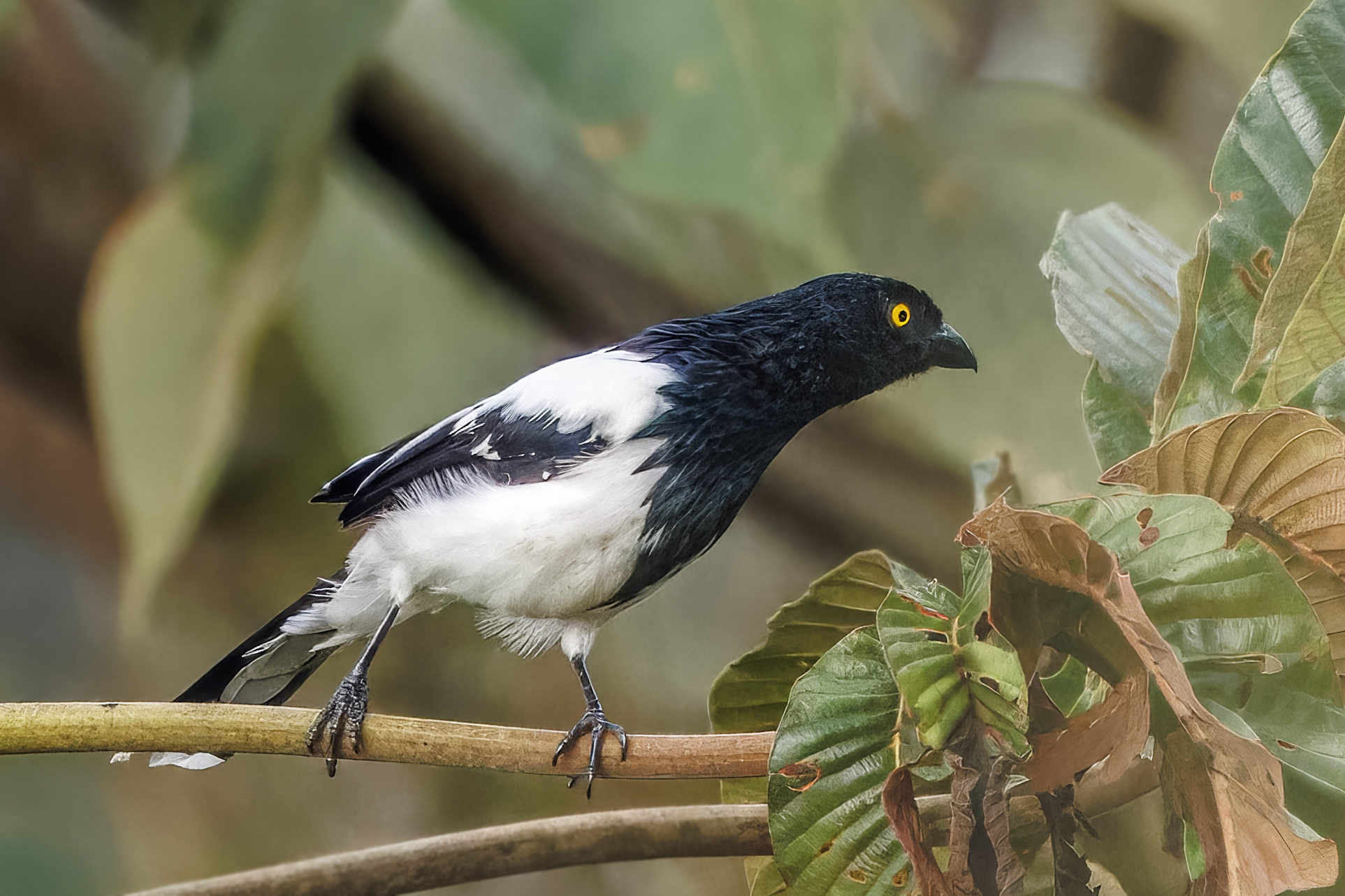
- C. l. leverianus, Ecuador

Conservation status
- Least Concern (IUCN 3.1)

Scientific classification
- Kingdom: Animalia
- Phylum: Chordata
- Class: Aves
- Order: Passeriformes
- Family: Thraupidae
- Genus: Cissopis; Vieillot, 1816
- Species: C. leverianus

Binomial name
- Cissopis leverianus (Gmelin, JF, 1788)

Synonyms
- Lanius leverianus (protonym); Cissopis leveriana

= Magpie tanager =

Species of bird

The magpie tanager (Cissopis leverianus) is a South American species of tanager. It is the only member of the monotypic genus Cissopis. As suggested by its common name, this blue-black and white species is superficially reminiscent of a European magpie. With a total length of 25–30 cm (9.8–11.8 in), a large percentage of which is tail, it is the longest species of tanager. It weighs 69–76 g (2.4–2.7 oz).

It is widespread in humid tropical and subtropical woodland, plantations, second growth, and parks in South America east of the Andes. It is absent from drier regions (such as the Caatinga) and most of north-eastern Brazil. In densely forested regions, it mainly occurs in relatively open sections (such as near major rivers). In such regions it is spreading with deforestation, which opens up the habitat. It is largely restricted to lowlands, but occurs up to an altitude of 2,000 m (6,600 ft) on the east Andean slopes. It is common throughout most of its range, but rarer in the Guianas.

It typically occurs in conspicuous, noisy pairs or groups of up to 10 individuals and commonly takes part in mixed-species flocks. It often moves its long tail up and down. It eats seeds, fruits, and insects. The cup-shaped nest is lined with grass, leaves, or other plant materials and is located low in trees near the ground or in shrubs in dense vegetation. The 2 eggs are reddish-brown with brown spots. The incubation time is 12–13 days in captivity.

== Taxonomy ==
The magpie tanager was formally described in 1788 by the German naturalist Johann Friedrich Gmelin under the binomial name Lanius leverianus. Gmelin's account was based on the "magpie shrike" that had been described in 1781 by the English ornithologist John Latham in his A General Synopsis of Birds. The type locality is Cayenne. The magpie tanager is now the only species placed in the genus Cissopis that was introduced in 1816 by the French ornithologist Louis Pierre Vieillot. The genus name Cissopis combines the Ancient Greek kissa meaning "magpie" with -ōpis meaning "-faced". The specific epithet leverianus was chosen to honour the English collector Ashton Lever.

Two subspecies are recognised:

- C. l. leverianus (Gmelin, JF, 1788) – east Colombia and south Venezuela through the Guianas and Amazonian Brazil to central Bolivia
- C. l. major Cabanis, 1851 – Paraguay, southeast Brazil and northeast Argentina
