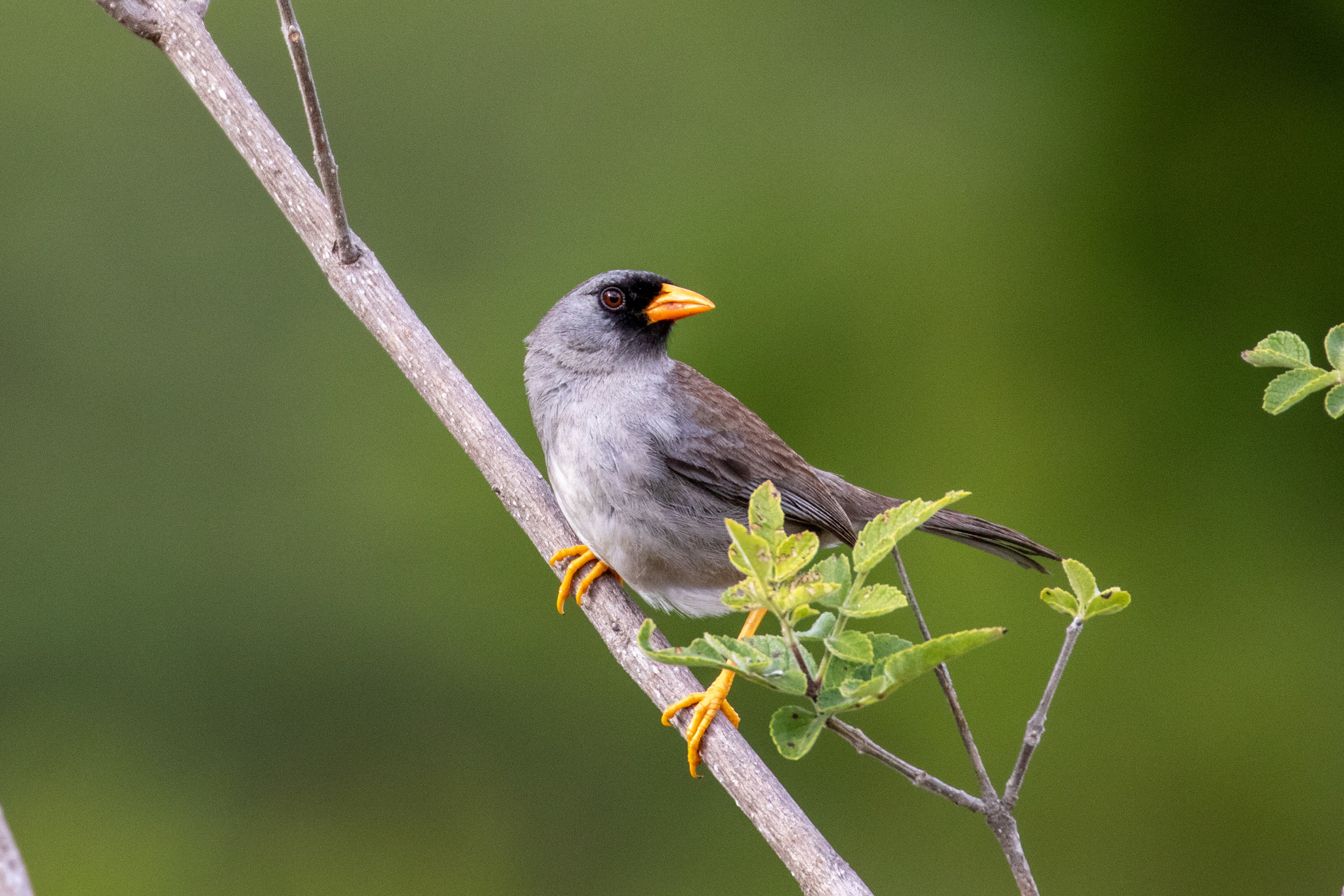
- Grey-winged Inca finch (Incaspiza ortizi)

Scientific classification
- Kingdom: Animalia
- Phylum: Chordata
- Class: Aves
- Order: Passeriformes
- Family: Thraupidae
- Genus: Incaspiza; Ridgway, 1898

Type species
- Haemophila pulchra Sclater, 1886

Species
- 5, see text

= Inca finch =

Genus of birds

The Inca finches form the genus Incaspiza, of finch-like birds in the tanager family Thraupidae. They were traditionally placed in the family Emberizidae, but molecular phylogenetic studies have shown that they belong in Thraupidae instead. Both their scientific and common name refer to the Incan civilization.

They are endemic to arid scrub in central and northern Peru. Buff-bridled, gray-winged and little Inca finches are restricted to the Marañón Valley. The rufous-backed Inca finch occurs either on the west slope of the Andes and both slopes of the Marañón Valley and is restricted to higher elevations, compared to great Inca finch which only occurs on the west slope of the Andes, but generally lower than the rufous-backed Inca finch. They are rather terrestrial, and typically forage within dense plant growth on the ground, but commonly perch higher, for example on the top of a tall cactus or in a small tree, when singing. They are typically seen singly or in pairs, but sometimes in small groups outside the breeding season. They normally do not take part in mixed-species flocks.

All have a pointed orange-yellow bill, a primarily gray head and chest, a paler buff or whitish belly, extensive white to the outer tail-feathers, and a small – but contrasting – black mask and chin. Except in the gray-winged Inca finch, all have a rufous back or wings.

== Taxonomy and species list ==
The genus Incaspiza was introduced in 1898 by the American ornithologist Robert Ridgway with the great Inca finch as the type species. The name combines Incas with the Ancient Greek σπίζα (spíza) meaning "finch". The genus was traditionally placed with the buntings and New World sparrows in the subfamily Emberizinae within an expanded family Emberizidae. A molecular phylogenetic study published in 2014 found that Incaspiza was embedded in the tanager family Thraupidae. Within this family, the genus is now placed with Rhopospina and Porphyrospiza in the subfamily Porphyrospizinae.

The genus contains the following five species.

Image	Scientific name	Common name	Distribution
	Incaspiza pulchra	Great Inca finch	Peru
	Incaspiza personata	Rufous-backed Inca finch	Peru
	Incaspiza ortizi	Grey-winged Inca finch	Peru
	Incaspiza laeta	Buff-bridled Inca finch	Peru
	Incaspiza watkinsi	Little Inca finch	Peru
