= I. laeta =

I. laeta may refer to:

- Incaspiza laeta, a bird endemic to Peru
- Ipomoea laeta, a morning glory
