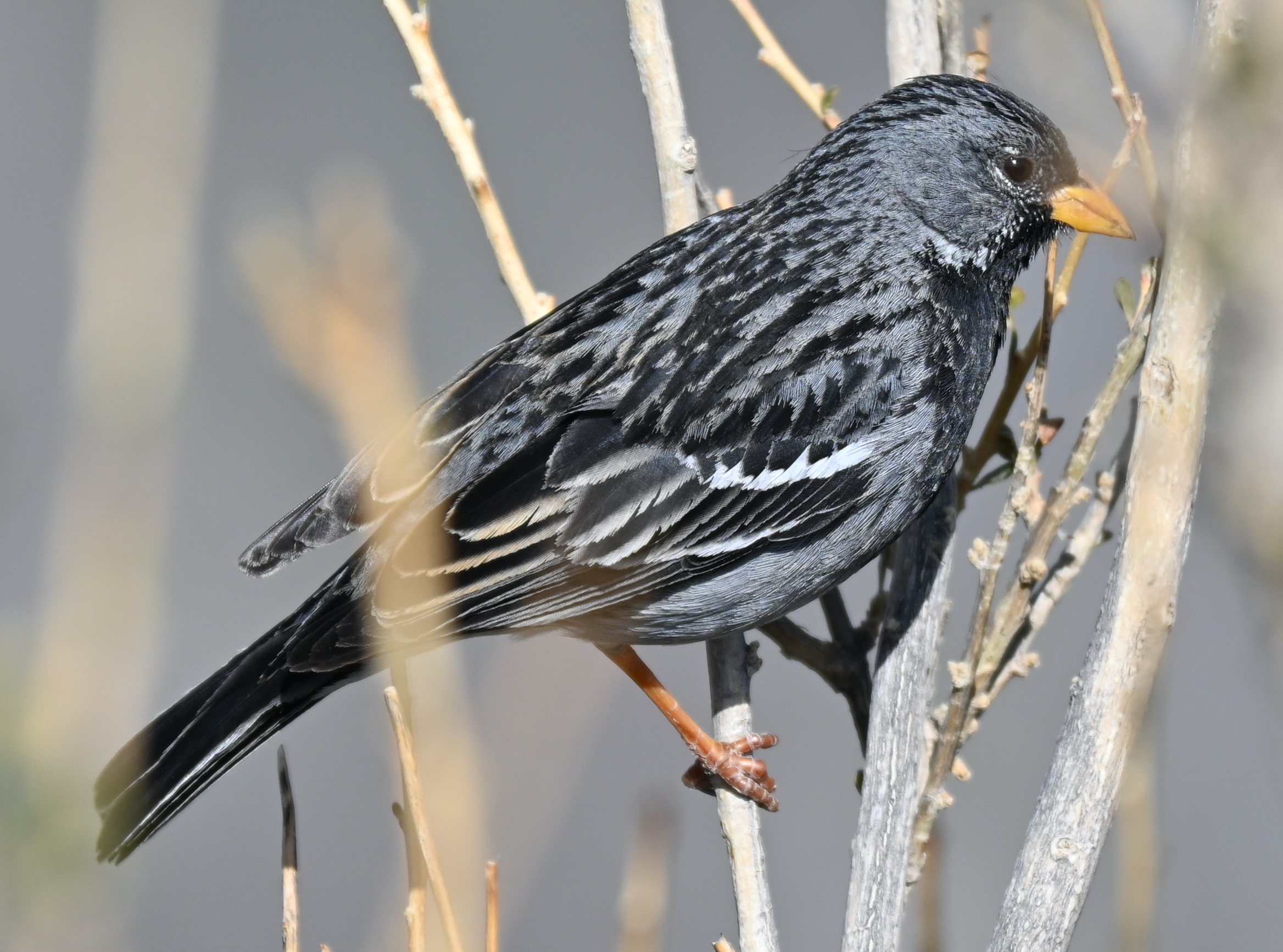
- Male R. f. peruviana mourning sierra finch
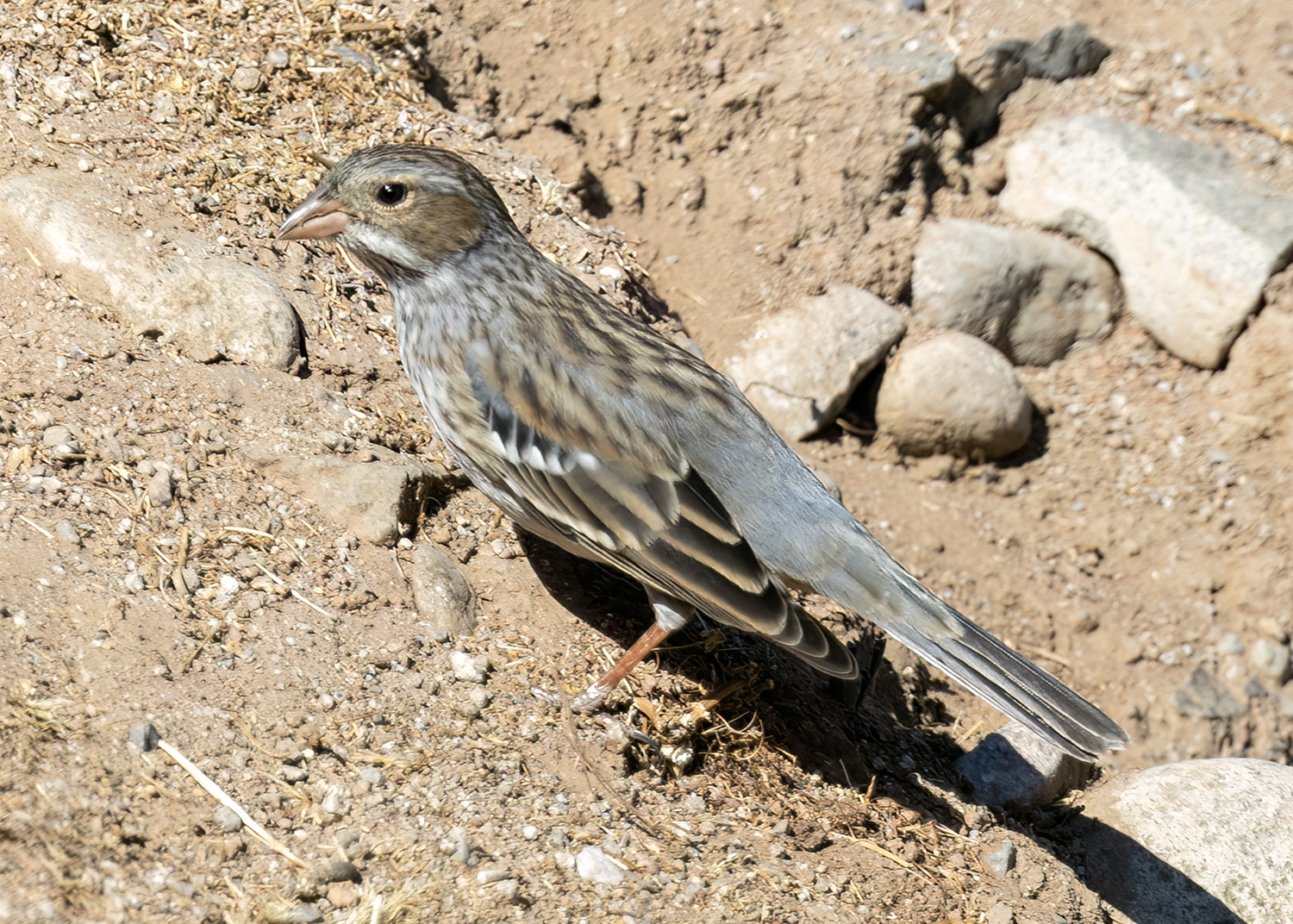
- Female R. f. fruticeti mourning sierra finch

Conservation status
- Least Concern (IUCN 3.1)

Scientific classification
- Kingdom: Animalia
- Phylum: Chordata
- Class: Aves
- Order: Passeriformes
- Family: Thraupidae
- Genus: Rhopospina; Cabanis, 1851
- Species: R. fruticeti

Binomial name
- Rhopospina fruticeti (Kittlitz, 1833)

Synonyms
- Fringilla fruticeti (protonym); Phrygilus fruticeti

= Mourning sierra finch =

Species of bird

The mourning sierra finch (Rhopospina fruticeti) is a species of bird in the family Thraupidae, the tanagers and allies. It is found in Argentina, Bolivia, Chile, and Peru and has been recorded as a vagrant to Brazil and the Falkland Islands.

== Taxonomy and systematics ==
The mourning sierra finch was formally described and illustrated in 1833 by the German naturalist Heinrich von Kittlitz with the binomial Fringilla fruticeti. The species was later reassigned to the genus Phrygilus. Both the genera Fringilla and Phrygilus were in the finch family Fringillidae but multiple studies published in the early 2000s showed that Phrygilus belonged in the tanager family Thraupidae. A molecular phylogenetic study published in 2014 found that Phrygilus was polyphyletic, and in the subsequent rearrangement, the mourning sierra finch was moved to the resurrected genus Rhopospina that had been introduced in 1851 by Jean Cabanis. The genus name combines the Ancient Greek rhōps meaning "bush" with spina meaning "finch". The specific epithet is from the Latin fruticetum meaning "thicket".

The mourning sierra finch has these three subspecies:

- R. f. peruviana (Zimmer, JT, 1924)
- R. f. coracina (Sclater, PL, 1891)
- R. f. fruticeti (Kittlitz, 1833)

== Description ==
The mourning sierra finch is about 18 cm (7.1 in) long and weighs 31.5 to 41.8 g (1.1 to 1.5 oz). It is a stocky bird with a long tail and a medium-sized bill. The species is sexually dimorphic. Adult males of the nominate subspecies R. f. fruticeti have a mostly gray head with blackish lores and dense black streaking on the crown. Their upperparts are gray with black streaks on the mantle and upper back. Their wings are mostly blackish with white tips on the coverts that show as two wing bars. Their chin, throat, and breast are blackish, their flanks grayish with streaks on their upper edges, their belly whitish, and their undertail coverts white. They have a brown iris, an orange-yellow bill, and dull orange legs and feet. Adult females have an olive-gray crown with black streaks, a pale gray supercilium, and warm brownish ear coverts with a white stripe below them. The sides of their neck are grayish. Their upperparts are brownish gray with dark streaks on the mantle and upper back. Their wing is brownish with two white wing bars and buff edges on the flight feathers. Their tail is brownish. Their throat is whitish with thin dark streaks and a blackish edge. Their breast is whitish and their flanks buffy; both have thin darker streaks. Their belly is unstreaked white and their undertail coverts pale buff with very thin darker streaks. They have dull pinkish legs and feet. Subspecies R. f. peruviana is smaller than the nominate and has brighter, more rufous upperparts with heavier streaking. Males of R. f. coracina are almost entirely black.

== Distribution and habitat ==
The subspecies of the mourning sierra finch are found thus:

- R. f. peruviana: from Cajamarca Department in northern Peru south into western Bolivia's La Paz Department
- R. f. coracina: southwestern Bolivia's Oruro and Potosí departments and the eastern parts of northern Chile's Arica y Parinacota and Tarapacá regions
- R. f. fruticeti: eastern Chile from Arica y Parinacota south to Coquimbo Region and from there the width of the country to northern Magallanes Region, western Argentina from Salta Province, and southern Argentina south from a line between northern Neuquén and southern Buenos Aires provinces to most of Santa Cruz Province

The species has also wandered several times to the Falkland Islands and at least once to far southern Brazil.

In the Andes the mourning sierra finch inhabits dry montane scrublands including Polylepis forest and its edges and some cultivated areas. In Patagonia it inhabits shrub-steppe, especially areas dominated by Berberis shrubs. Overall it ranges from sea level to 4,200 m (13,800 ft) and in Peru from 2,300 to 4,200 m (7,500 to 13,800 ft).

== Behavior ==
=== Movement ===
The populations of the mourning sierra finch from Peru to northern Chile and Argentina are year-round residents. Those in central Chile move to lower elevations and populations in far southern Argentina move north for the austral winter, though both movements are not fully defined.

=== Feeding ===
The mourning sierra finch feeds on seeds and invertebrates. It forages on the ground, often near cover. In the breeding season it forages singly, in pairs, or in small family groups; in winter flocks of up to 100 individuals have been recorded in Chile. The species sometimes joins mixed-species feeding flocks of sparrows and other finch-like tanagers.

=== Breeding ===
The mourning sierra finch breeds between October and January in central Chile and slightly later in Patagonia. Its breeding season in Peru includes April and May. It is thought to be semicolonial without strong territorial behavior. Males give an aerial display up to about 10 m (35 ft) high during which it sings as it descends with spread wings and tail. Its nest is "loose and untidy", with a body of grasses and a softer lining, and is usually in a small dense shrub. The clutch is two or three eggs that are light green with olive-brown spots. The incubation period, time to fledging, and details of parental care are not known.

=== Vocalization ===
The mourning sierra finch's vocalizations differ somewhat across its range. In general it is described as "very odd-sounding, loud, mechanical, and buzzy...the buzz often preceded by short chip and followed by ringing note pik-chzzzzzééééé chwiip. In Peru it sings "a fairly unmusical buzz followed by a short, squeaky note: bjzzzz-tcheeLEEuu" and its call is "a distinctive, nasal, raspy rheeeah".

== Status ==
The IUCN has assessed the mourning sierra finch as being of Least Concern. It has a very large range; its population size is not known but is believed to be stable. No immediate threats have been identified. It is considered generally common but "fairly common and widespread" in Peru and less common in much of Buenos Aires Province. It occurs in national parks and other protected areas in much of its range.
