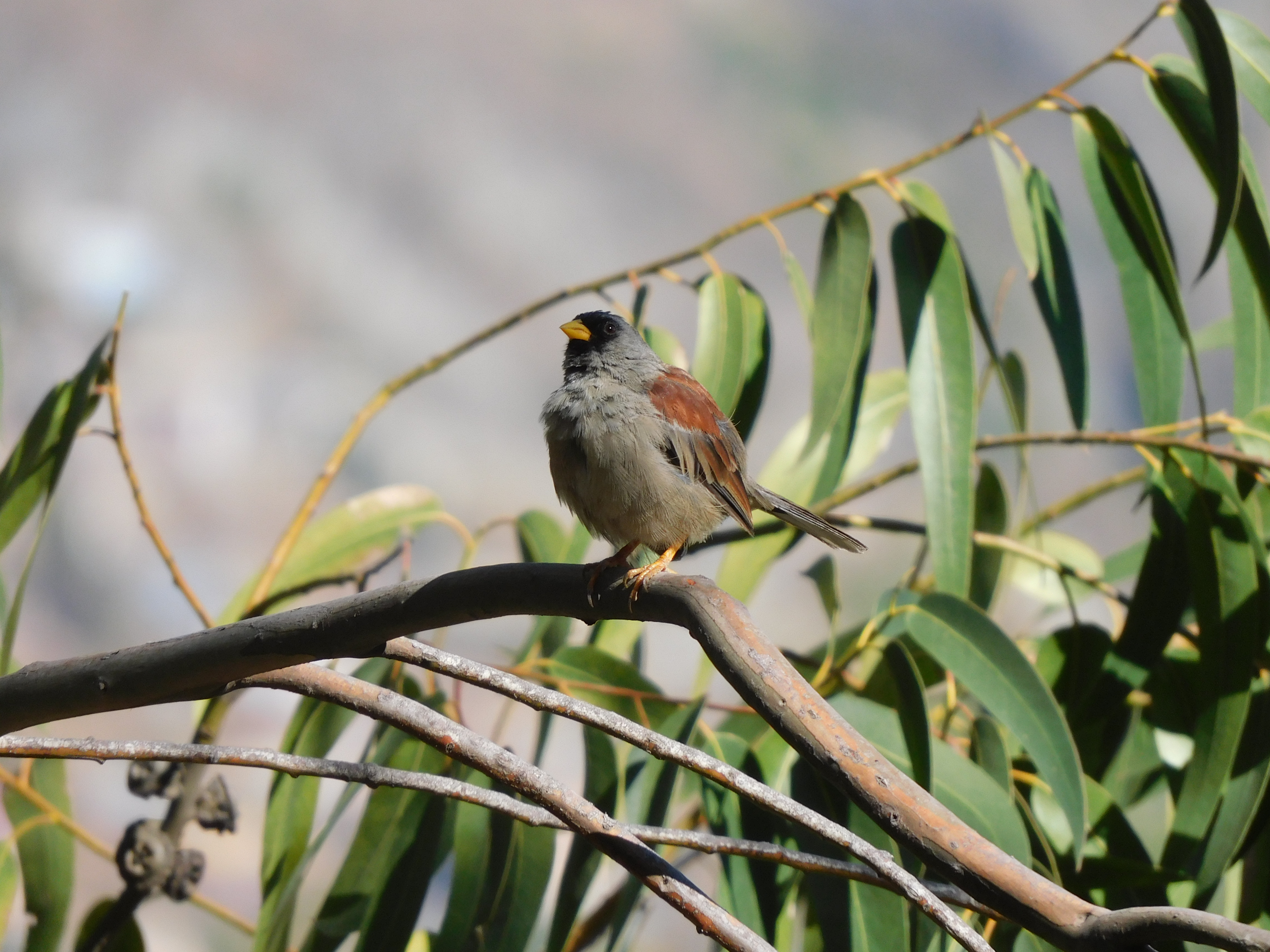

Conservation status
- Least Concern (IUCN 3.1)

Scientific classification
- Kingdom: Animalia
- Phylum: Chordata
- Class: Aves
- Order: Passeriformes
- Family: Thraupidae
- Genus: Incaspiza
- Species: I. personata

Binomial name
- Incaspiza personata (Salvin, 1895)

= Rufous-backed Inca finch =

Species of bird

The rufous-backed Inca finch (Incaspiza personata) is a species of bird in the family Thraupidae, the tanagers and allies. It is endemic to Peru.

== Taxonomy and systematics ==
The great Inca finch was formally described in 1895 with the binomial Haemophila personata. It was later reassigned to its present genus Incaspiza that had been erected in 1898. A molecular phylogenetic study published in 2014 found that Incaspiza belonged in the tanager family Thraupidae. Some mid-twentieth century authors treated the rufous-backed Inca finch, the great Inca finch (I. pulchra), and the grey-winged Inca finch (I. ortizi) as conspecific, and others treated them as a superspecies. However, they are very distinct genetically.

The rufous-backed Inca finch is monotypic.

== Description ==
The rufous-backed Inca finch is 16.5 to 18 cm (6.5 to 7.1 in) long and weighs 29.5 to 33 g (1.0 to 1.2 oz). It has a long tail and a slim pointed bill. The sexes have the same plumage. Adults have a mostly gray head with a brown cast on the nape, blackish lores, and a blackish mask and throat. Their upperparts are mostly rufous that is somewhat grayer on the rump. Their wings are mostly rufous with gray outer median and greater coverts and browner basal halves of the tertials. Their tail is black with white edges on the outer feathers. Their breast is gray, their flanks buffy gray, and their belly and vent off-white. They have a brown iris, a bright yellow bill, and orange-yellow legs and feet.

== Distribution and habitat ==
The rufous-backed Inca finch is found in north-central Peru in the upper valley of the Marañón River and on the western slope of the Andes. It ranges from southern Cajamarca Department south to southeastern Ancash and southwestern Huánuco departments. It inhabits dry slopes with cacti, agave, and the large bromeliad Puya raimondii. In elevation it ranges between 2,300 and 4,000 m (7,500 and 13,100 ft).

== Behavior ==
=== Movement ===
The rufous-backed Inca finch is a sedentary year-round resident.

=== Feeding ===
The rufous-backed Inca finch's diet has not been studied. It forages on the ground, typically singly or in pairs.

=== Breeding ===
The rufous-backed Inca finch's breeding season includes March to June but nothing else is known about the species' breeding biology.

=== Vocalization ===
The rufous-backed Inca finch's song is "a weak, high tisew-ti’TSWEE?". Its calls include "high tseet notes".

== Status ==
The IUCN has assessed the rufous-backed Inca finch as being of Least Concern. Its population size is not known but is believed to be stable. No immediate threats have been identified. It is considered uncommon.
