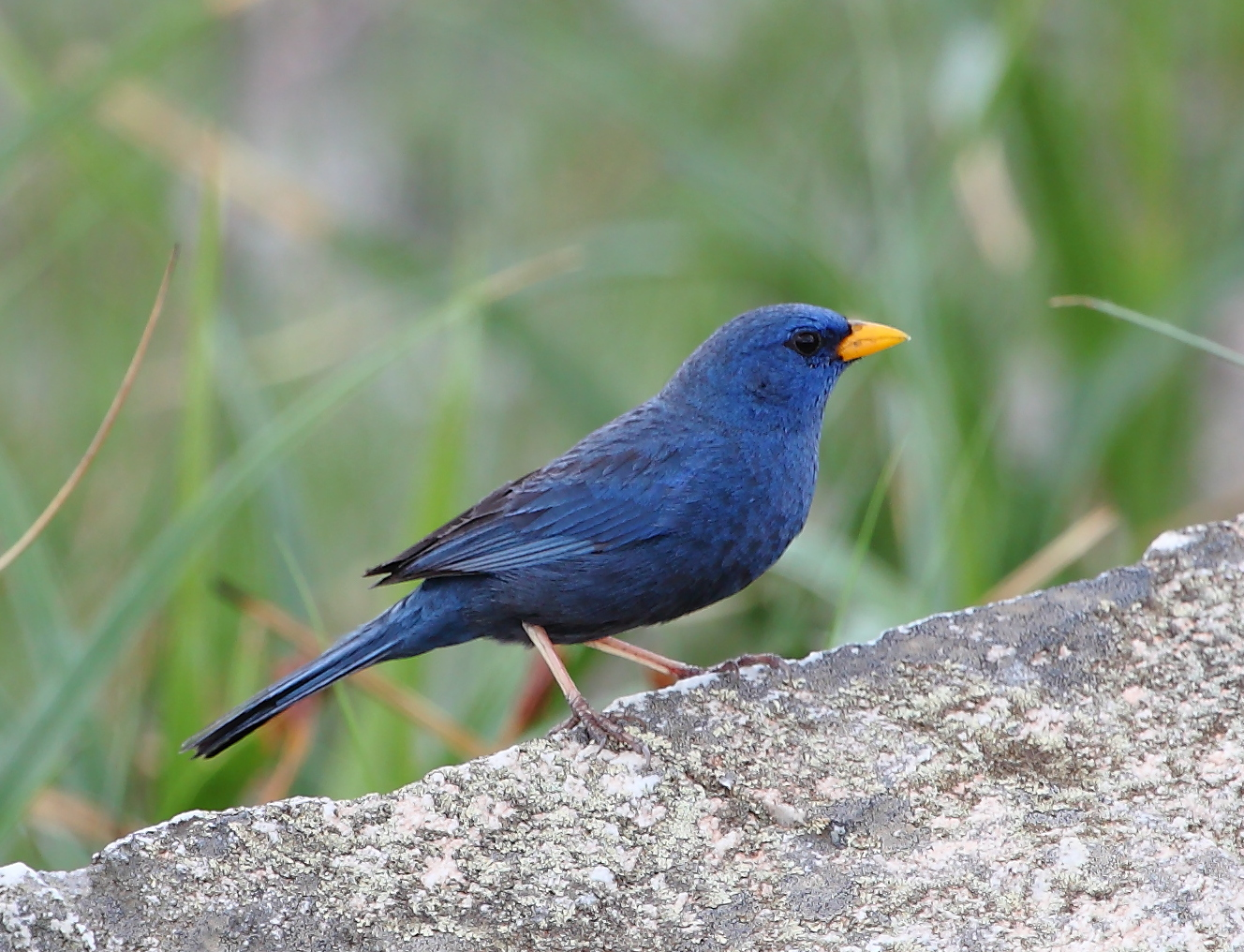
- Male at Serra da Canastra National Park, Minas Gerais state, Brazil

Conservation status
- Near Threatened (IUCN 3.1)

Scientific classification
- Kingdom: Animalia
- Phylum: Chordata
- Class: Aves
- Order: Passeriformes
- Family: Thraupidae
- Genus: Rhopospina
- Species: R. caerulescens

Binomial name
- Rhopospina caerulescens (Wied-Neuwied, M, 1830)

Synonyms
- See text

= Blue finch =

Species of bird

The blue finch or yellow-billed blue finch (Rhopospina caerulescens) is a Near Threatened species of bird in the family Thraupidae, the tanagers and allies. It is found in Bolivia and Brazil.

== Taxonomy and systematics ==
The blue finch was formally described in 1830 with the binomial Tanagra caerulescens. It was later reassigned to the genus Porphyrospiza. That genus was long in family Emberizidae which at the time held many New and Old World species. There it was grouped with the cardinalines which were later separated as the family Cardinalidae. A study published in 2007 showed that the genus belonged in its present tanager family Thraupidae. Beginning in 2019 most taxonomic systems began reassigning the blue finch to the resurrected genus Rhopospina that had been erected in 1851. However, as of late 2025 BirdLife International's Handbook of the Birds of the World retains it as the only species in Porphyrospiza.

The blue finch is monotypic.

== Description ==
The blue finch is about 12.5 cm (4.9 in) long and weighs about 13 g (0.46 oz). It is a slim bird with a long tail and a long bill. The species is sexually dimorphic. Adult males are almost entirely bright indigo-blue. They have blackish lores, blackish wings and tail with wide blue feather edges, and rufous tips on the feathers of the back that quickly wear away. Adult females have a mostly pale brownish head with a paler supercilium and crescents above and below the eye. Their upperparts are mostly warm brown with thin darker streaks on the back. Their rump and uppertail coverts are grayish. Their wing coverts are warm brown with paler tips that show as two faint wing bars. Their wings are dark grayish with warm brown edges on the flight feathers. Their tail is dark grayish. Their throat and underparts are buffy white with thin brown streaks on the throat, breast, and flanks and heavier streaks on the undertail coverts. Both sexes have a dark brown iris and dull pink legs and feet. Males have a yellow bill; the female's is a duller yellow with a dark tip and culmen.

== Distribution and habitat ==
The blue finch has a "tilted V" main range that in Brazil is roughly within a line from west-central Rondônia east to northern Goiás, then northeast to northeastern Maranhão and northern Piauí, south to southern Minas Gerais, and west to far northwestern Mato Grosso do Sul. There are also very small scattered populations outside the main range. Its range extends west into eastern and southern Bolivia's Beni, Santa Cruz, and probably Chuquisaca departments. It primarily inhabits the cerrado, a tropical savanna landscape. Within it the species greatly favors campos rupestres, a grassland with rocky outcrops, some bushes, and relatively few trees. In Brazil it ranges in elevation from sea level to 1,100 m (3,600 ft).

== Behavior ==
=== Movement ===
The blue finch is a sedentary year-round resident.

=== Feeding ===
The blue finch feeds mostly on seeds with invertebrates making up about 20% of its diet. It forages on the ground, in the breeding season mostly singly or in pairs and outside it in small flocks.

=== Breeding ===
The blue finch's breeding season has not been defined but appears to be linked to the seasonal rains and includes September to November. One nest was described as made from dry grasses and placed near the ground in a small bush. The clutch is two or three eggs that are white lightly speckled with brown and rust. The incubation period is about 14 days; the time to fledging is not known. Both parents provision nestlings.

=== Vocalization ===
The blue finch's song is a "simple but pleasant, calm, very high feét-feét-teu feét-feét-teu" whose teu is lower pitched.

== Status ==
The IUCN originally in 1988 assessed the blue finch as being of Least Concern and since 1994 as Near Threatened. Its population size is not known and is believed to be decreasing. "Conversion to agriculture for Eucalyptus plantations, soybeans and pasture for exportable crops (encouraged by government land reform) have severely impacted its habitat, particularly in Brazil. Two thirds of cerrado habitat had been extensively or significantly modified by 1993, with most destruction having occurred since 1950." It is considered "uncommon to rare" in Brazil. It does occur in several protected areas in Brazil and at least one in Bolivia.
