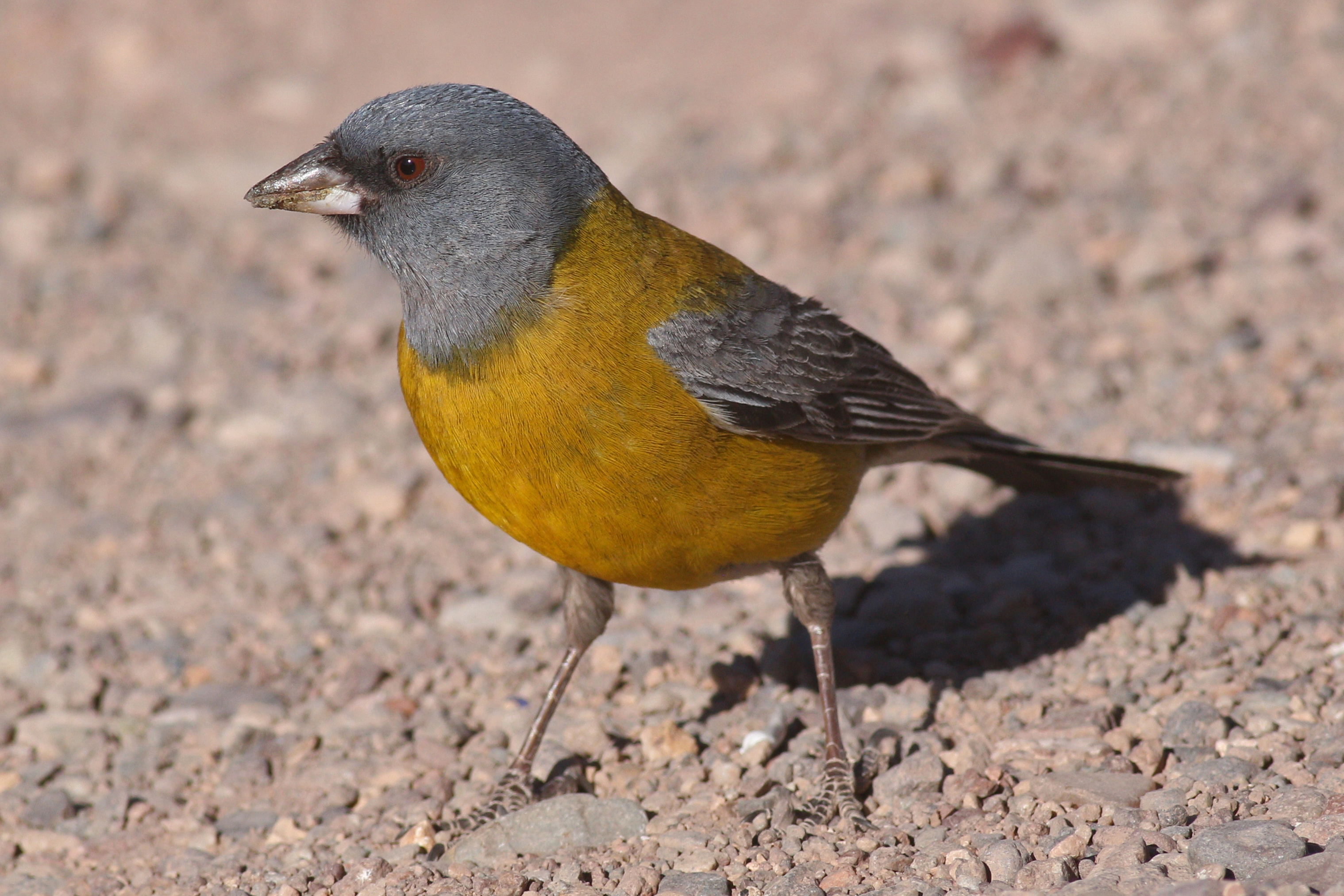

Conservation status
- Least Concern (IUCN 3.1)

Scientific classification
- Kingdom: Animalia
- Phylum: Chordata
- Class: Aves
- Order: Passeriformes
- Family: Thraupidae
- Genus: Phrygilus
- Species: P. gayi

Binomial name
- Phrygilus gayi (Gervais, 1834)

= Grey-hooded sierra finch =

Species of bird

The grey-hooded sierra finch (Phrygilus gayi) is a species of bird in the family Thraupidae.

It is found in Argentina and Chile where its natural habitats are subtropical or tropical dry shrubland and subtropical or tropical high-altitude shrubland.

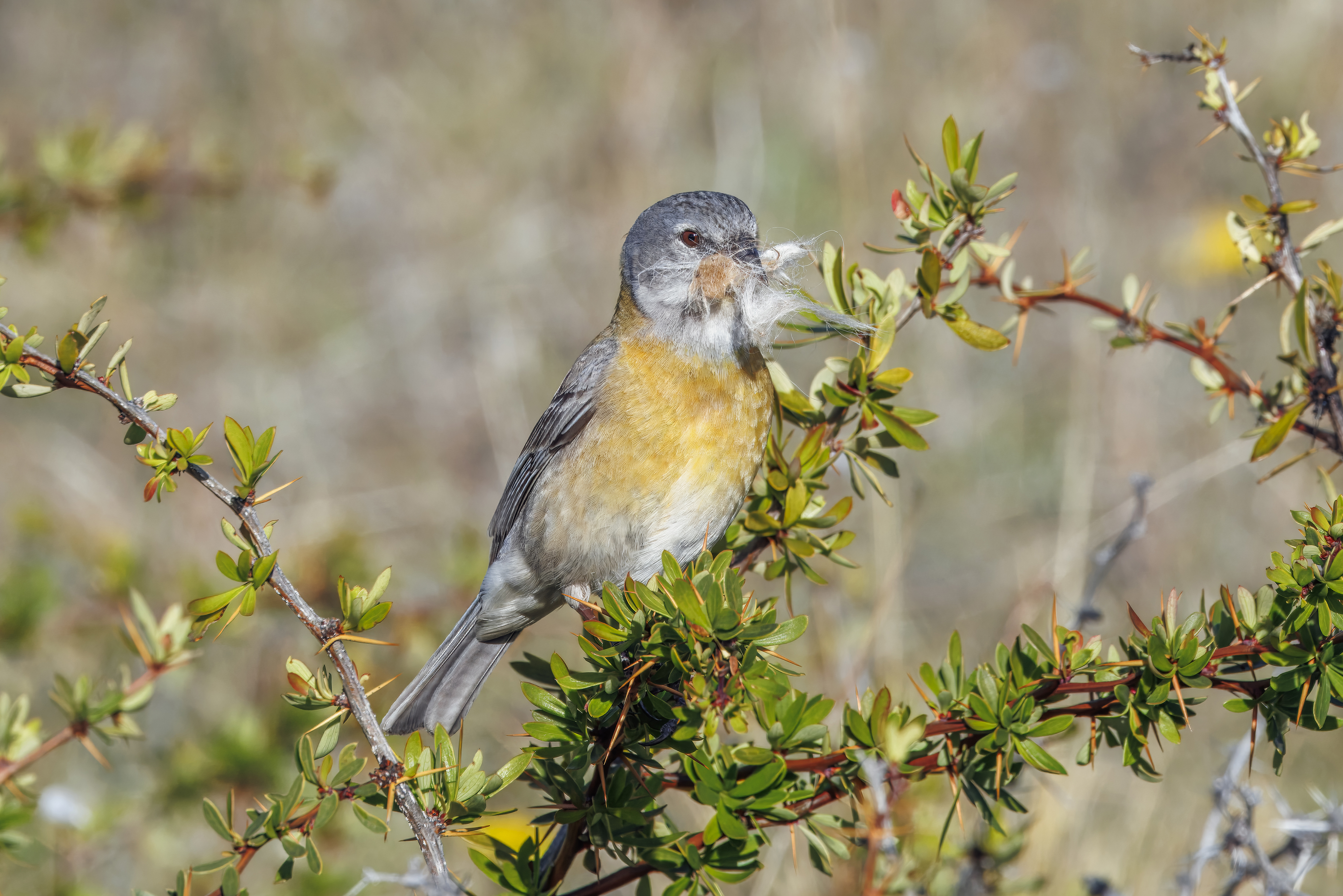
female with nesting material

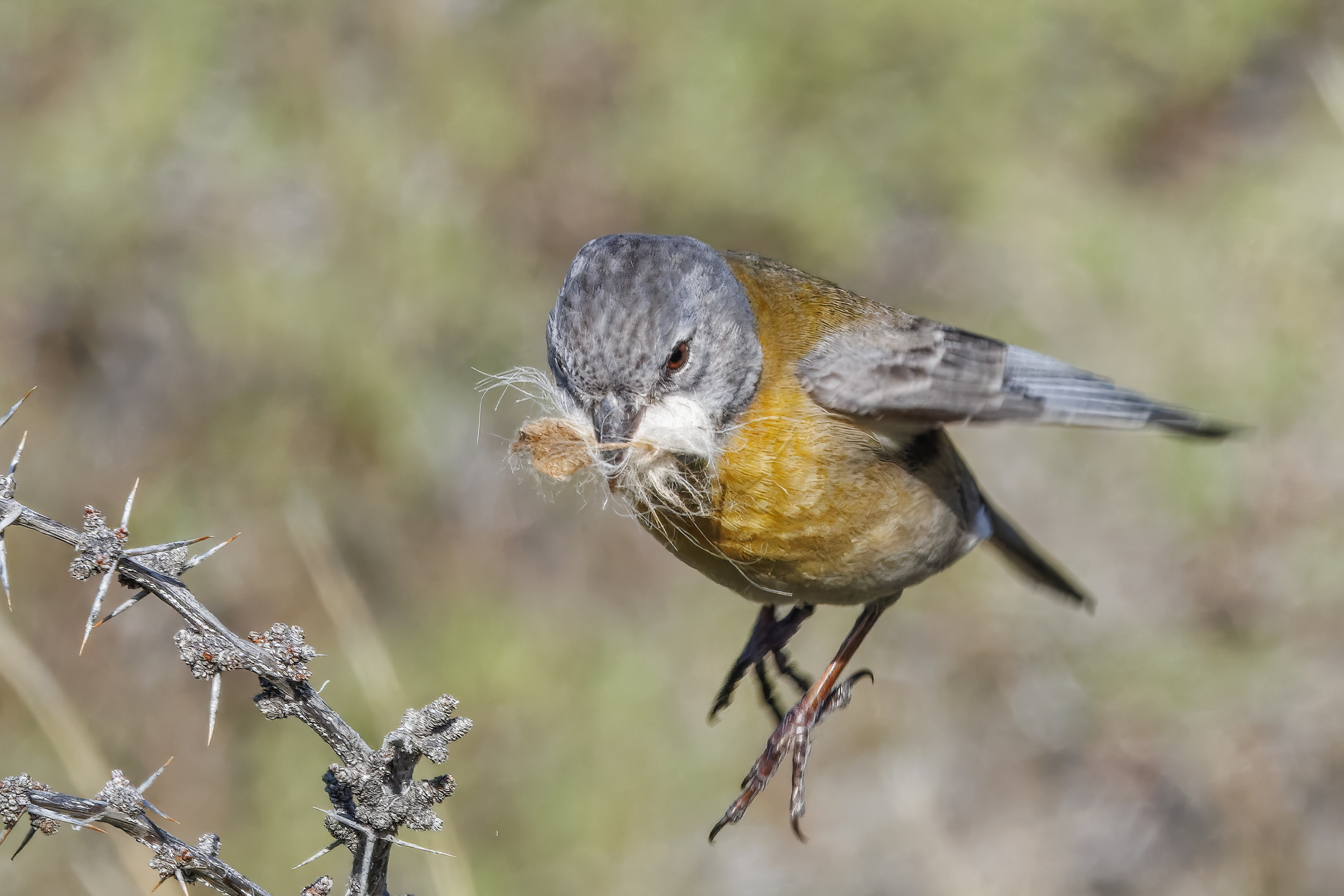
taking flight
