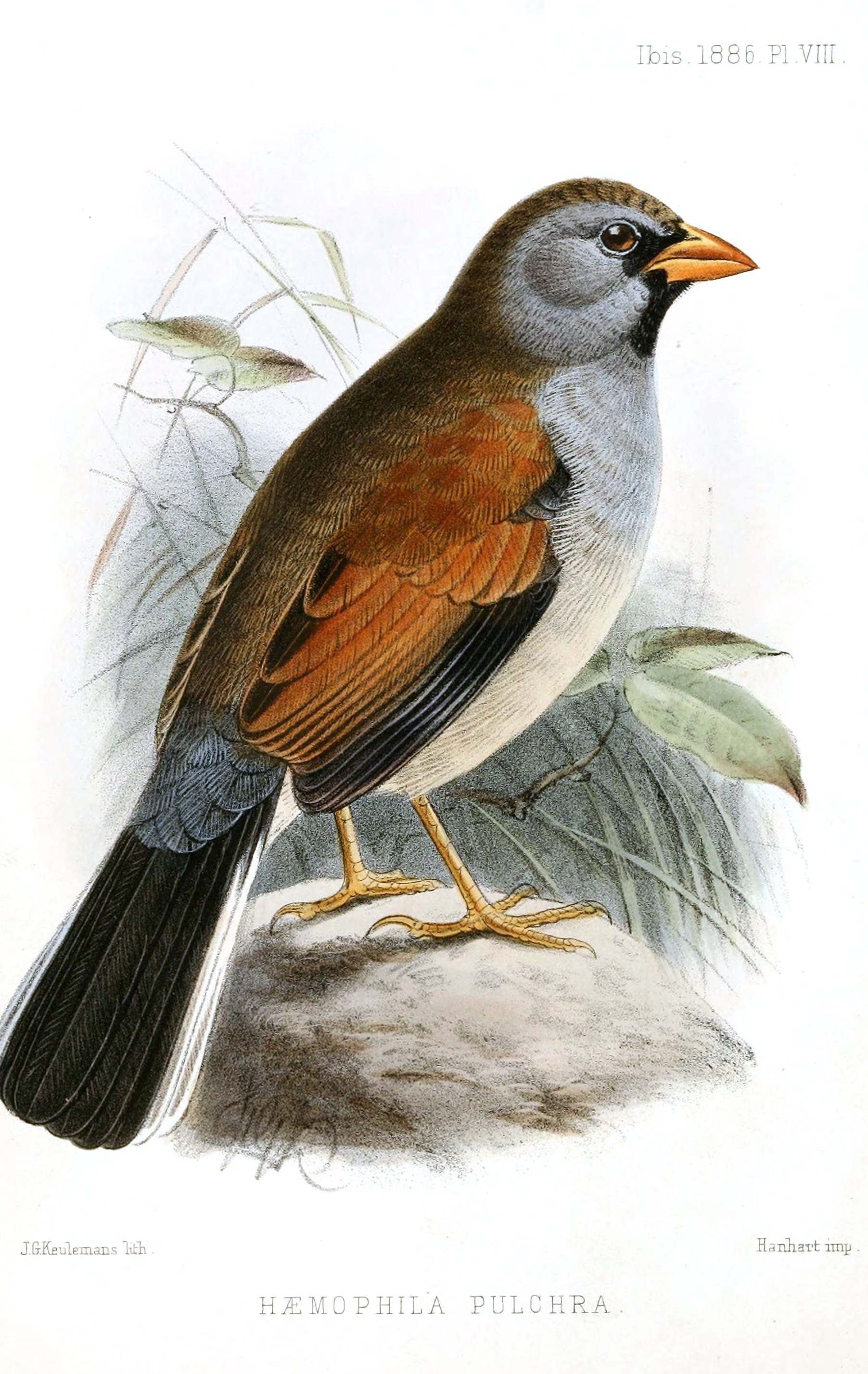

Conservation status
- Least Concern (IUCN 3.1)

Scientific classification
- Kingdom: Animalia
- Phylum: Chordata
- Class: Aves
- Order: Passeriformes
- Family: Thraupidae
- Genus: Incaspiza
- Species: I. pulchra

Binomial name
- Incaspiza pulchra (Sclater, PL, 1886)

Synonyms
- Haemophila pulchra (protonym)

= Great Inca finch =

Species of bird

The great Inca finch (Incaspiza pulchra) is a species of passerine bird in the family Thraupidae, the tanagers and allies. It is endemic to Peru.

== Taxonomy and systematics ==
The great Inca finch was formally described in 1886 with the binomial Haemophila pulchra. In 1898 Robert Ridgway erected genus Incaspiza with pulchra as the type species and placed it in the finch family Fringillidae. A molecular phylogenetic study published in 2014 found that Incaspiza belonged in the tanager family Thraupidae. Some mid-twentieth century authors treated the greater Inca finch, the rufous-backed Inca finch (I. personata), and the grey-winged Inca finch (I. ortizi) as conspecific, and others treated them as a superspecies. However, they are very distinct genetically.

The great Inca finch is monotypic.

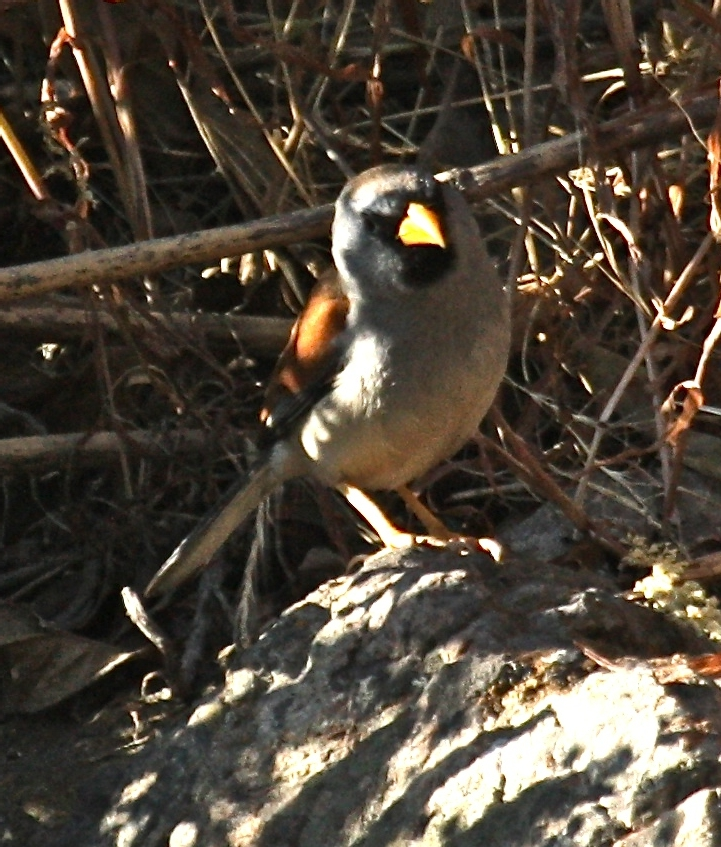
In the Santa Eulalia Valley, Peru

== Description ==
The great Inca finch is 16.5 cm (6.5 in) long and weighs 25.5 to 32 g (0.90 to 1.1 oz). It has a long tail and a slim pointed bill. The species is sexually dimorphic though the sexes are very similar. Adult males have a mostly gray head with a brown cast on the crown and nape, blackish lores, a blackish triangular mask and throat, and a thin whitish gray supercilium above the mask. Their upperparts are mostly brownish with rufous scapulars. Their wings are mostly rufous with gray lesser coverts and browner basal halves of the tertials. Their tail is black with white edges on the outer feathers. Their breast is gray, their flanks buffy gray, and their belly and vent off-white. Adult females have the same plumage pattern as males but are overall somewhat duller and have a browner crown and nape. Both sexes have a dark brown iris, an orange-yellow bill, and orange-yellow legs and feet.

== Distribution and habitat ==
The great Inca finch is found on the western slope of the Peruvian Andes from southern La Libertad Department south to southern Lima Department. It inhabits slopes and gullies with Melocactus "Turks's head" cacti and terrestrial bromeliads. In elevation it ranges between 1,000 and 2,700 m (3,300 and 8,900 ft) though mostly above 1,500 m (4,900 ft).

== Behavior ==
=== Movement ===
The great Inca finch is a sedentary year-round resident.

=== Feeding ===
The great Inca finch forages on the ground and feeds primarily Melocactus cactus fruit. During the breeding season it is usually single or in pairs and in the non-breeding season may be in groups of up to about seven individuals.

=== Breeding ===
The great Inca finch's breeding season includes May and June but nothing else is known about the species' breeding biology.

=== Vocalization ===
The great Inca finch's song is "a series of high, thin whistles: tsew tseee? tsew tswee?...". Its calls are "a short, descending, quavering high note: tsee’le’le’le’le'le'le; also a single tsew or tsee".

== Status ==
The IUCN has assessed the great Inca finch as being of Least Concern. It has a restricted range; its population size is not known but is believed to be stable. No immediate threats have been identified. It is considered uncommon.
