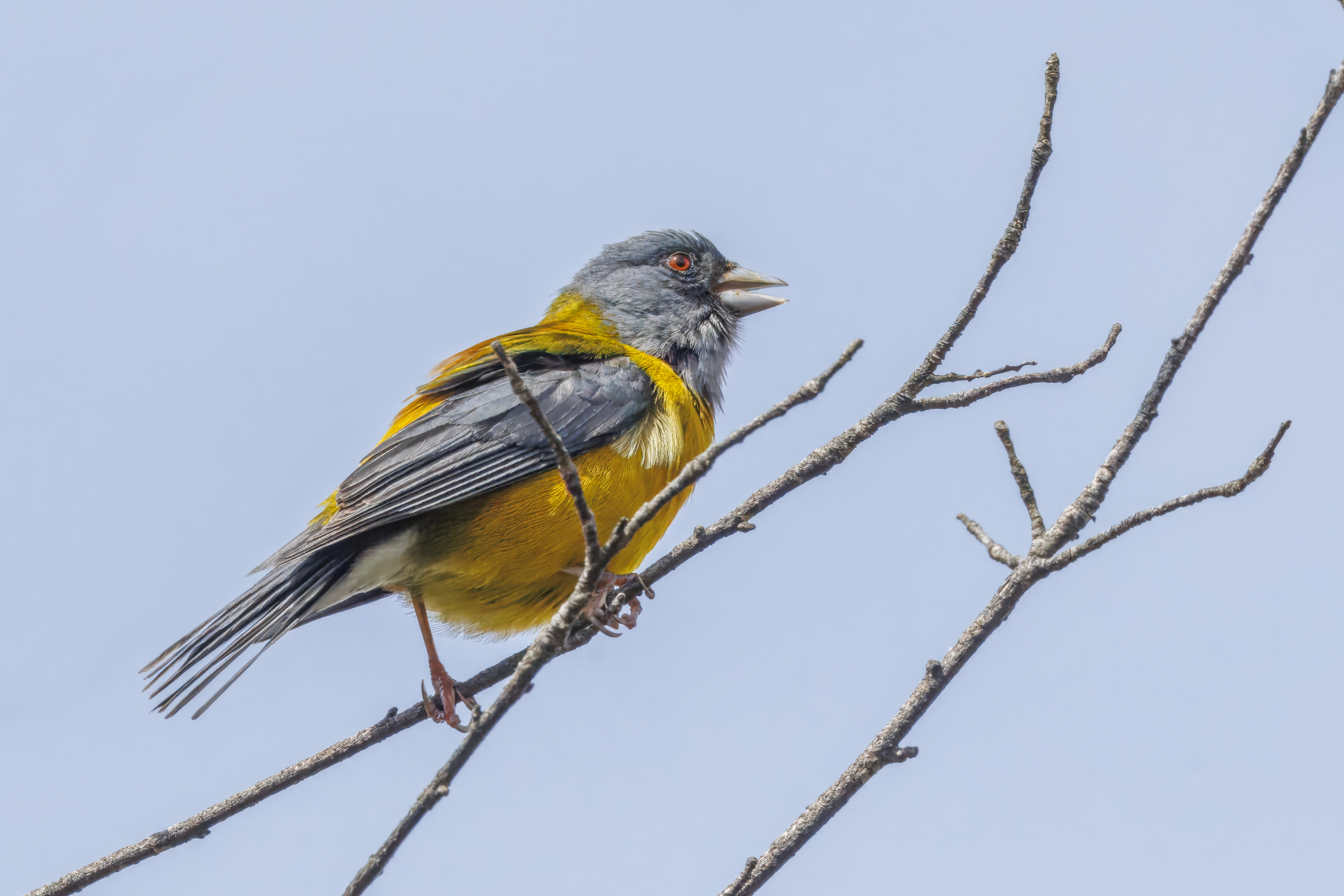
- on Chiloé Island, Chile

Conservation status
- Least Concern (IUCN 3.1)

Scientific classification
- Kingdom: Animalia
- Phylum: Chordata
- Class: Aves
- Order: Passeriformes
- Family: Thraupidae
- Genus: Phrygilus
- Species: P. patagonicus

Binomial name
- Phrygilus patagonicus Lowe, 1923

= Patagonian sierra finch =

Species of bird

The Patagonian sierra finch (Phrygilus patagonicus) is a species of bird in the family Thraupidae. It is found in Argentina and Chile.

Its natural habitats are temperate forests, subtropical or tropical dry shrubland, and temperate grassland.

Its diet consists mainly of seeds, flower parts, nectar, fruit, and insects, but it has also been seen to forage on human refuse.
