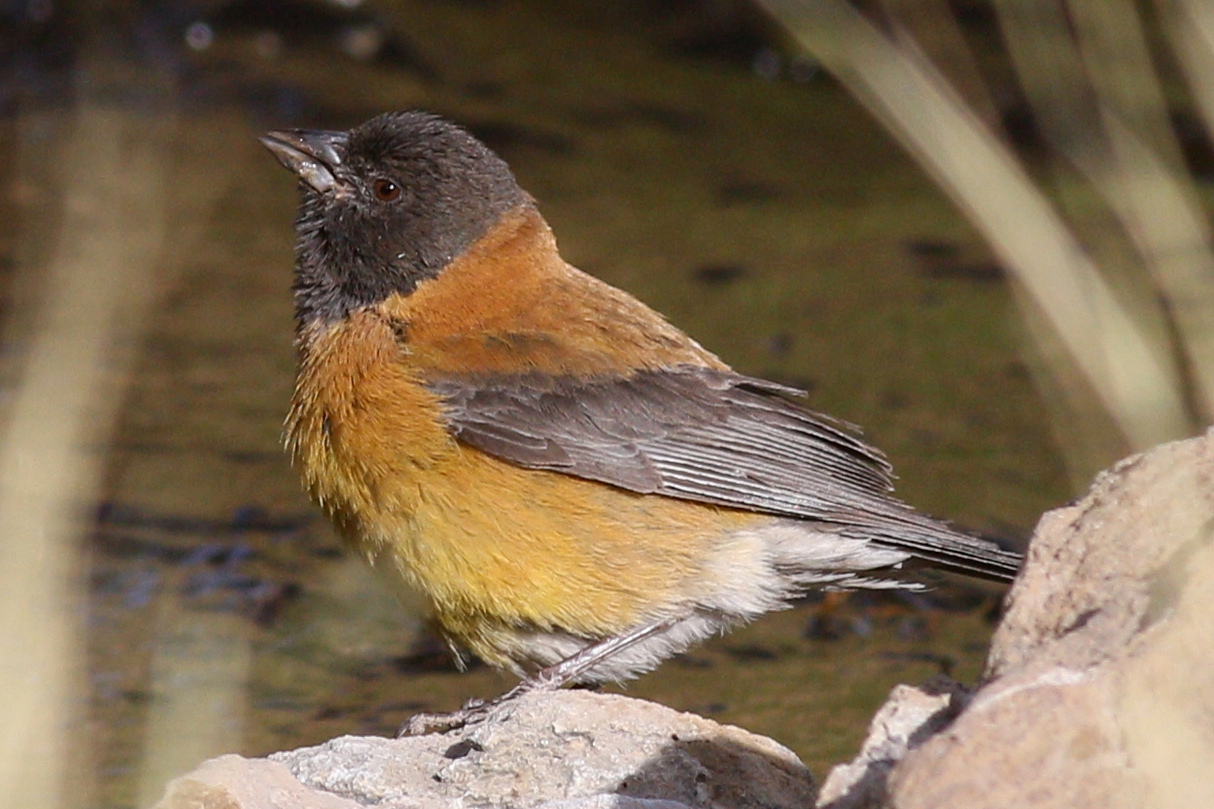

Conservation status
- Least Concern (IUCN 3.1)]

Scientific classification
- Kingdom: Animalia
- Phylum: Chordata
- Class: Aves
- Order: Passeriformes
- Family: Thraupidae
- Genus: Phrygilus
- Species: P. atriceps

Binomial name
- Phrygilus atriceps (Lafresnaye & d'Orbigny, 1837)

= Black-hooded sierra finch =

Species of bird

The black-hooded sierra finch (Phrygilus atriceps) is a species of bird in the family Thraupidae.

It is found in Argentina, Bolivia, Chile, and Peru. Its natural habitats are subtropical or tropical moist montane forests and subtropical or tropical high-altitude shrubland.

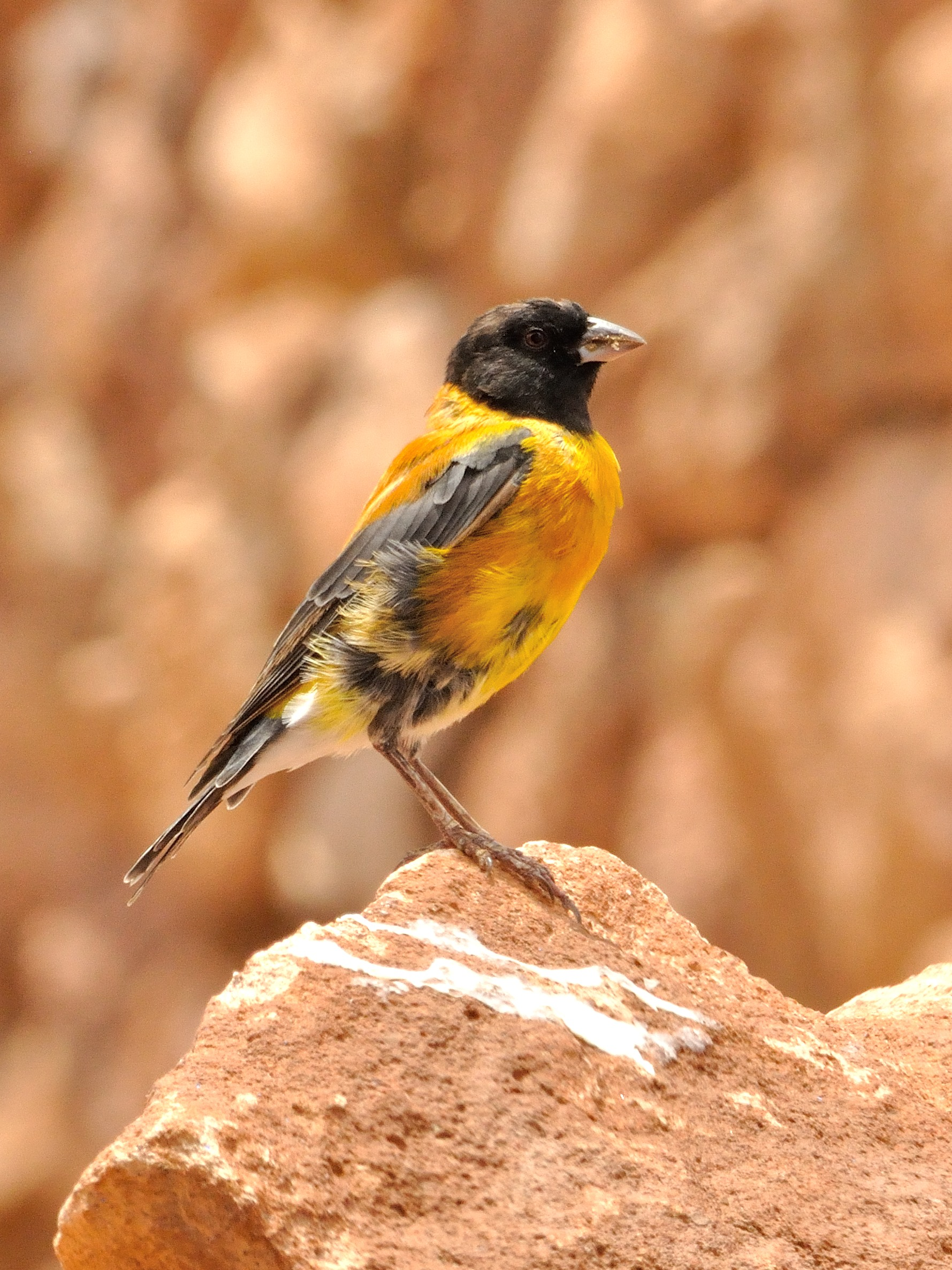
Black hooded sierra finch, near San Pedro de Atacama, Chile
