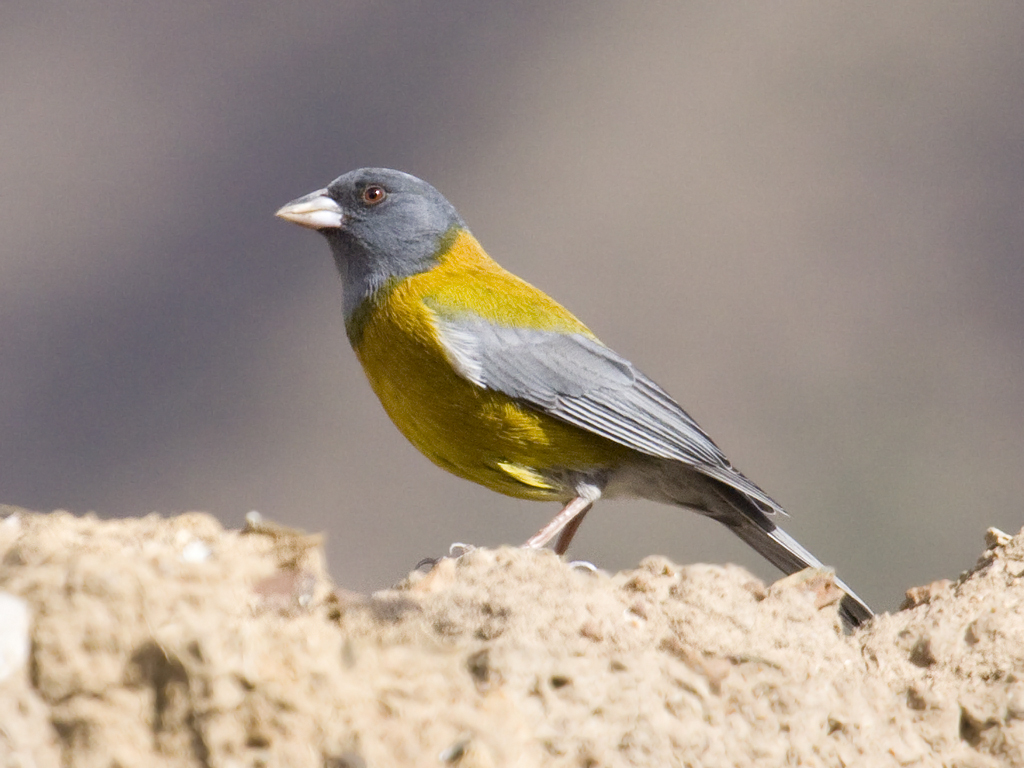
- near Cusco, Peru

Conservation status
- Least Concern (IUCN 3.1)

Scientific classification
- Kingdom: Animalia
- Phylum: Chordata
- Class: Aves
- Order: Passeriformes
- Family: Thraupidae
- Genus: Phrygilus
- Species: P. punensis

Binomial name
- Phrygilus punensis Ridgway, 1887

= Peruvian sierra finch =

Species of bird

The Peruvian sierra finch (Phrygilus punensis) is a species of bird in the family Thraupidae.

It is found in western Bolivia and Peru where its natural habitat is subtropical or tropical high-altitude shrubland.
