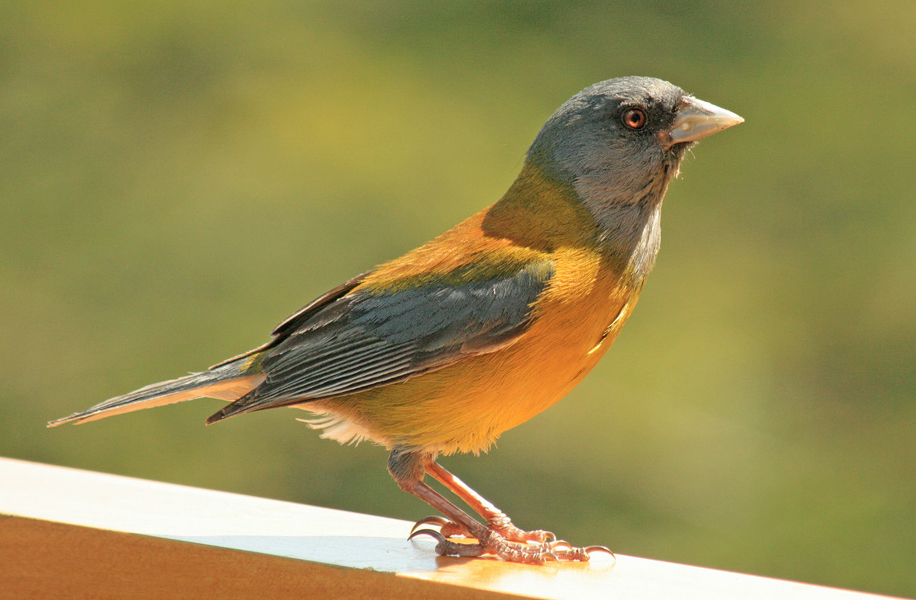
- Patagonian sierra finch (Phrygilus patagonicus)

Scientific classification
- Domain: Eukaryota
- Kingdom: Animalia
- Phylum: Chordata
- Class: Aves
- Order: Passeriformes
- Family: Thraupidae
- Genus: Phrygilus; Cabanis, 1844

Type species
- Fringilla gayi Gervais, 1834

Species
- See text

= Phrygilus =

Genus of birds

Phrygilus is a genus of mainly Andean seed-eating tanagers commonly known as sierra finches. Phrygilos means finch in Ancient Greek. Traditionally classified in the bunting and American sparrow family Emberizidae, more recent studies have shown them to belong in the Thraupidae.

== Taxonomy and species list ==
The genus Phrygilus was introduced in 1844 by the German ornithologist Jean Cabanis with the grey-hooded sierra finch as the type species. The name is from the Ancient Greek phrugilos, an unidentified bird mentioned by Aristophanes.

The genus formerly included additional species. A molecular phylogenetic study published in 2014 found that the genus was highly polyphyletic and in the resulting reorganization members of the genus were moved to Geospizopsis, Rhopospina, Porphyrospiza and Idiopsar. The genus now contains four species.

Genus Phrygilus – Cabanis, 1844 – four species
Common name	Scientific name and subspecies	Range	Size and ecology	IUCN status and estimated population
Black-hooded sierra finch	Phrygilus atriceps (Lafresnaye & d'Orbigny, 1837)	Argentina, Bolivia, Chile, and Peru.	Size: Habitat: Diet:	LC
Peruvian sierra finch	Phrygilus punensis Ridgway, 1887	Bolivia and Peru	Size: Habitat: Diet:	LC
Grey-hooded sierra finch	Phrygilus gayi (Gervais, 1834)	Argentina and Chile	Size: Habitat: Diet:	LC
Patagonian sierra finch	Phrygilus patagonicus Lowe, 1923	Argentina and Chile.	Size: Habitat: Diet:	LC
