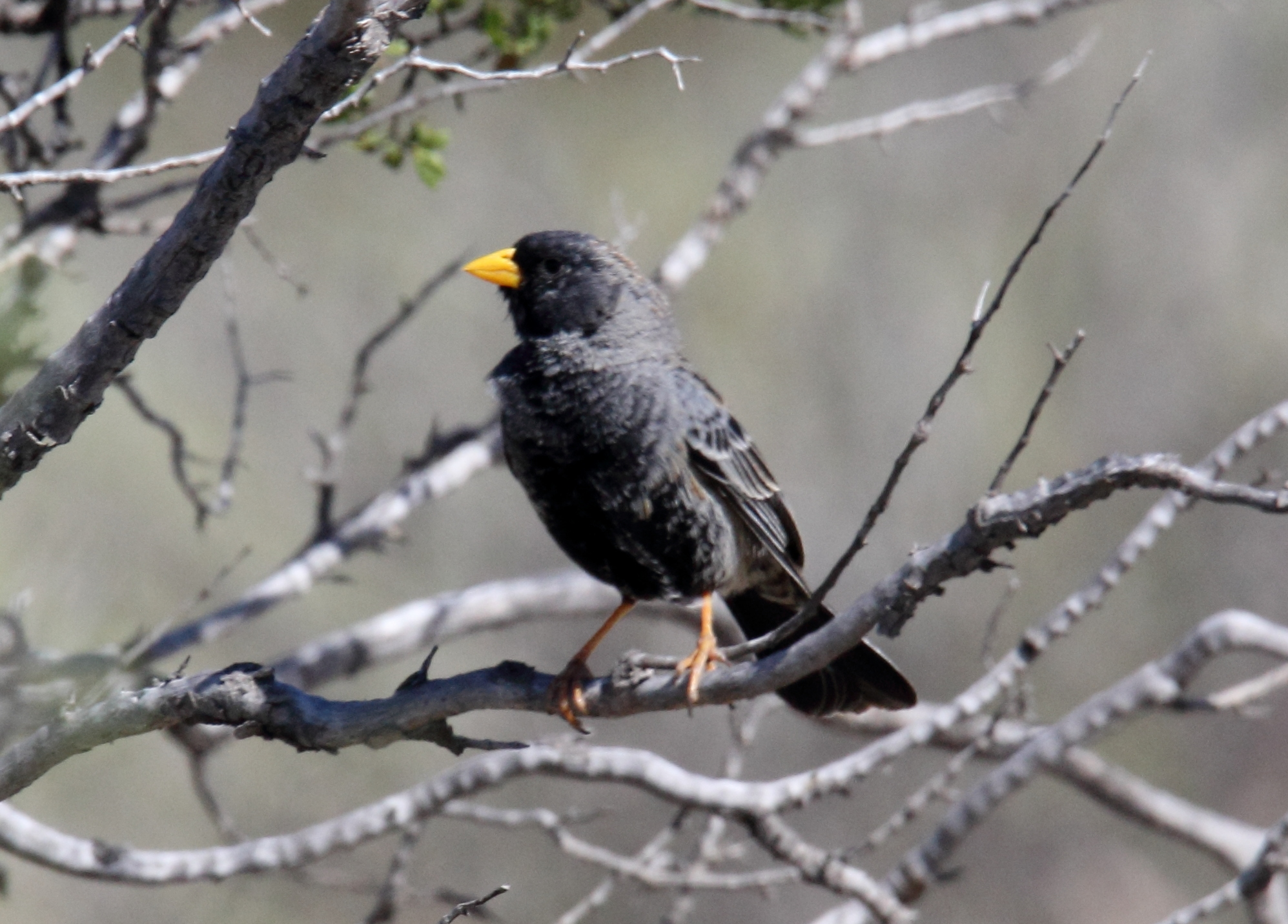

Conservation status
- Least Concern (IUCN 3.1)

Scientific classification
- Kingdom: Animalia
- Phylum: Chordata
- Class: Aves
- Order: Passeriformes
- Family: Thraupidae
- Genus: Rhopospina
- Species: R. carbonaria

Binomial name
- Rhopospina carbonaria (Lafresnaye & d'Orbigny, 1837)
- Year-round Non-Breeding

Synonyms
- See text

= Carbonated sierra finch =

Species of bird

The carbonated sierra finch (Rhopospina carbonaria), also known as the carbon sierra-finch, is a species of bird in the family Thraupidae, the tanagers and allies. It is endemic to Argentina.

== Taxonomy and systematics ==
The carbonated sierra finch has a complicated taxonomic history that is not yet fully resolved. It was formally described in 1837 with the binomial Emberiza carbonaria. It was later assigned to the genus Phrygilus and later still to genus Porphyrospiza. Those genera were long in family Emberizidae which at the time held many New and Old World species. There they were grouped with the cardinalines which were later separated as the family Cardinalidae. A study published in 2007 showed that Porphyrospiza belonged in its present tanager family Thraupidae. Beginning in 2019 most taxonomic systems began reassigning the carbonated sierra finch to the resurrected genus Rhopospina that had been erected in 1851. However, in 2016 BirdLife International's Handbook of the Birds of the World moved it from Phrygilus to Corydospiza and as of late 2025 retains it there.

The carbonated sierra finch is monotypic.

== Description ==
The carbonated sierra finch is 14 to 14.5 cm (5.5 to 5.7 in) long and weighs 16.1 to 18 g (0.57 to 0.63 oz). It has a long tail and a long, thick-based, conical bill. The species is sexually dimorphic. Adult males have a blackish face and a cold dark gray crown, nape, and upper back with blackish streaks. Their lower back and rump are dark gray with a brownish wash and no streaks. Their wings are mostly blackish with thin gray feather edges and two faint white wing bars. Their tail is blackish with thin gray feathers edges. Their underparts are blackish from the chin to the vent with more grayish flanks. Adult females have a mostly brownish gray head and upperparts with darker streaks. Their wings and tail are brownish gray. Their throat and underparts are off-white with darker streaking on the breast and flanks. Both sexes have a dark brown iris, a bright yellow bill, and dusky pinkish legs and feet.

== Distribution and habitat ==
Sources differ on the carbonated sierra finch's range within Argentina. The IUCN, which uses BirdLife International data, is the source of this article's map. It places the species from Tucumán Province southeast to the Atlantic in central Buenos Aires Province and south to western Río Negro Province. From Río Negro the range's border stretches east to the Atlantic in far southern Buenos Aires. The Cornell Lab of Ornithology's Birds of the World has the same Tucumán to central Buenos Aires and Tucumán to Río Negro lines as the IUCN. However, from Río Negro it extends the southern limit southeast to the Atlantic at the border of Chubut and Santa Cruz provinces. Martín R. de la Peña's field guide also has the same northeastern line as the other two but extends the range even further south, to the Atlantic in central Santa Cruz.

During the breeding season the carbonated sierra finch inhabits shrub-steppe. Outside that season it adds other shrubby landscapes, including those with the mesquite Prosopis flexuosa, and the edges of grasslands and agricultural fields.

== Behavior ==
=== Movement ===
The carbonated sierra finch is a partial migrant, though the details of its movements are scarce. Some of the southern birds move north for the austral winter; some remain year-round. The species is found only in winter north of a line roughly from northern Mendoza Province southeast to near the southern border of Buenos Aires.

=== Feeding ===
The carbonated sierra finch feeds on seeds and arthropods, favoring the latter in the breeding season. It forages on the ground, usually in pairs during the breeding season and in small flocks at other times.

=== Breeding ===
The carbonated sierra finch breeds roughly from October to February. Males make a flight display that may reach 15 m (50 ft) high and sings during the gliding descent. The nest is partially spherical and built from dried grasses on or not far above the ground. The clutch is three eggs that are grayish white with chestnut spots. The incubation period, time to fledging, and details of parental care are not known.

=== Vocalization ===
The carbonated sierra finch's flight display song is "a high-pitched buzzy trill 2 seconds long, tz-tz-tz-tz-tzee-tzee-tzee" and its call "a high tiip".

== Status ==
The IUCN has assessed the carbonated sierra finch as being of Least Concern. It has a large range; its population size and trend are not known. No immediate threats have been identified. It is considered "[r]easonably common throughout its large breeding range". It occurs in two national parks.
