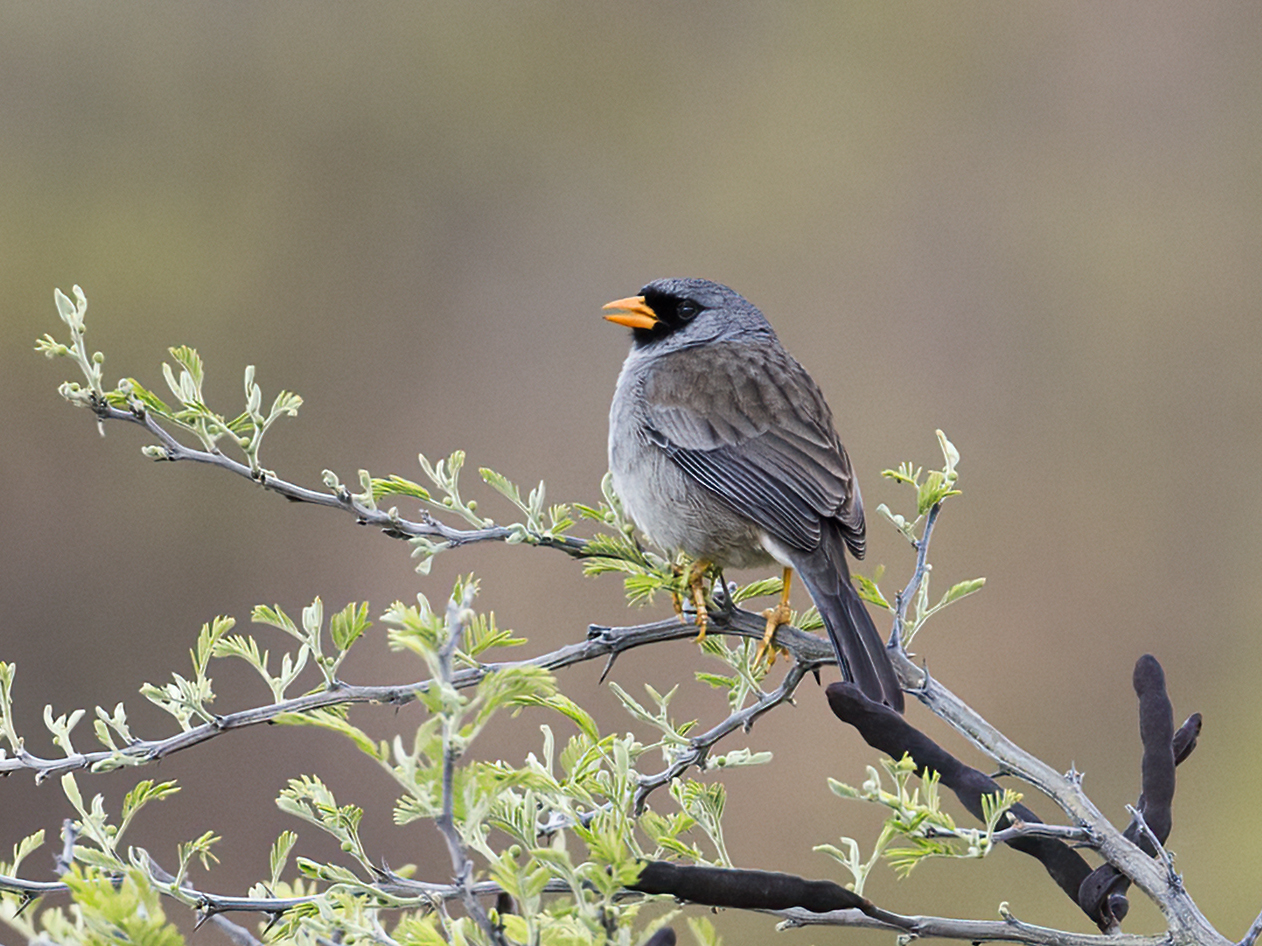

Conservation status
- Least Concern (IUCN 3.1)

Scientific classification
- Kingdom: Animalia
- Phylum: Chordata
- Class: Aves
- Order: Passeriformes
- Family: Thraupidae
- Genus: Incaspiza
- Species: I. ortizi

Binomial name
- Incaspiza ortizi Zimmer, 1952

= Grey-winged Inca finch =

Species of bird

The grey-winged Inca finch (Incaspiza ortizi) is a species of bird in the family Thraupidae, the tanagers and allies. It is endemic to Peru.

== Taxonomy and systematics ==
The grey-winged Inca finch was formally described by John T. Zimmer in 1952 with its current binomial Incaspiza ortizi. Zimmer's specific epithet honors Javier Ortiz de la Puente, who collected the type specimen. The genus Incaspiza long was part of the finch family Fringillidae but a molecular phylogenetic study published in 2014 found that it belonged in the tanager family Thraupidae. Some mid-twentieth century authors treated the grey-winged Inca finch, the rufous-backed Inca finch (I. personata), and the great Inca finch (I. pulchra) as conspecific, and others treated them as a superspecies. However, they are very distinct genetically.

The grey-winged Inca finch is monotypic.

== Description ==
The grey-winged Inca finch is 16.5 cm (6.5 in) long and weighs 29 to 38 g (1.0 to 1.3 oz). It has a long tail and a slim pointed bill. The species is sexually dimorphic though the sexes are very similar. Adult males have a mostly gray head with a brown cast on the nape, dark lores, and a dark triangular mask and throat. Their upper back is grayish brown with obscure darker streaks and their lower back, rump, and uppertail coverts brownish. Their wings are mostly gray with browner inner greater coverts and brown edges on the tertials. Their tail is black with white edges on the outer feathers. Their lower throat, breast, and flanks are gray and their belly and vent off-white. Adult females have the same plumage pattern as males but with less black on the face, cloudier gray on the breast and flanks, and less white on the belly. Both sexes have a dark chestnut iris, a bright yellow bill, and orange-yellow legs and feet.

== Distribution and habitat ==
The grey-winged Inca finch was long found on the western side of the central reaches of the Marañón River from far eastern Piura Department south through far eastern Lambayeque and western Cajamarca departments to central Cajamarca. There are also records from the western Andean slope in Cajamarca. Since 2010 it has been found somewhat more widely. It inhabits thick desert scrublands with cacti and terrestrial bromeliads and also open Acacia woodlands with cacti and bromeliads. Sources differ on its elevational range. One says it is 1,800 and 2,600 m (5,900 and 8,500 ft) and another says 1,800 and 2,300 m (5,900 and 7,500 ft).

== Behavior ==
=== Movement ===
The grey-winged Inca finch is a sedentary year-round resident.

=== Feeding ===
The grey-winged Inca finch feeds on seeds, other plant matter, and insects. It forages on or slightly above the ground, usually in cover, and usually singly or in pairs.

=== Breeding ===
The grey-winged Inca finch's breeding season apparently spans from May to September but nothing else is known about the species' breeding biology.

=== Vocalization ===
The grey-winged Inca finch's song is "a series of weak, quavering, high whistles: seeew sweeee? seeee? seeew sueeesu...".

== Status ==
The IUCN originally in 1988 assessed the grey-winged Inca finch as Threatened, then in 1994 as Near Threatened, in 2000 as Vulnerable, and since 2017 as being of Least Concern. It has a small range; its estimated population of between 2500 and 10,000 mature individuals is believed to be stable. "Slopes adjacent to Huancabamba [in Piura] have been extensively cleared for cultivation and pasture, and there appears to be no other suitable habitat in the vicinity. Consequently, if this hilltop were to be burnt, the northernmost population would surely be lost. However, further south, it survives on heavily disturbed, steep slopes, which appear unlikely to be usable to any greater degree." It is considered uncommon.
