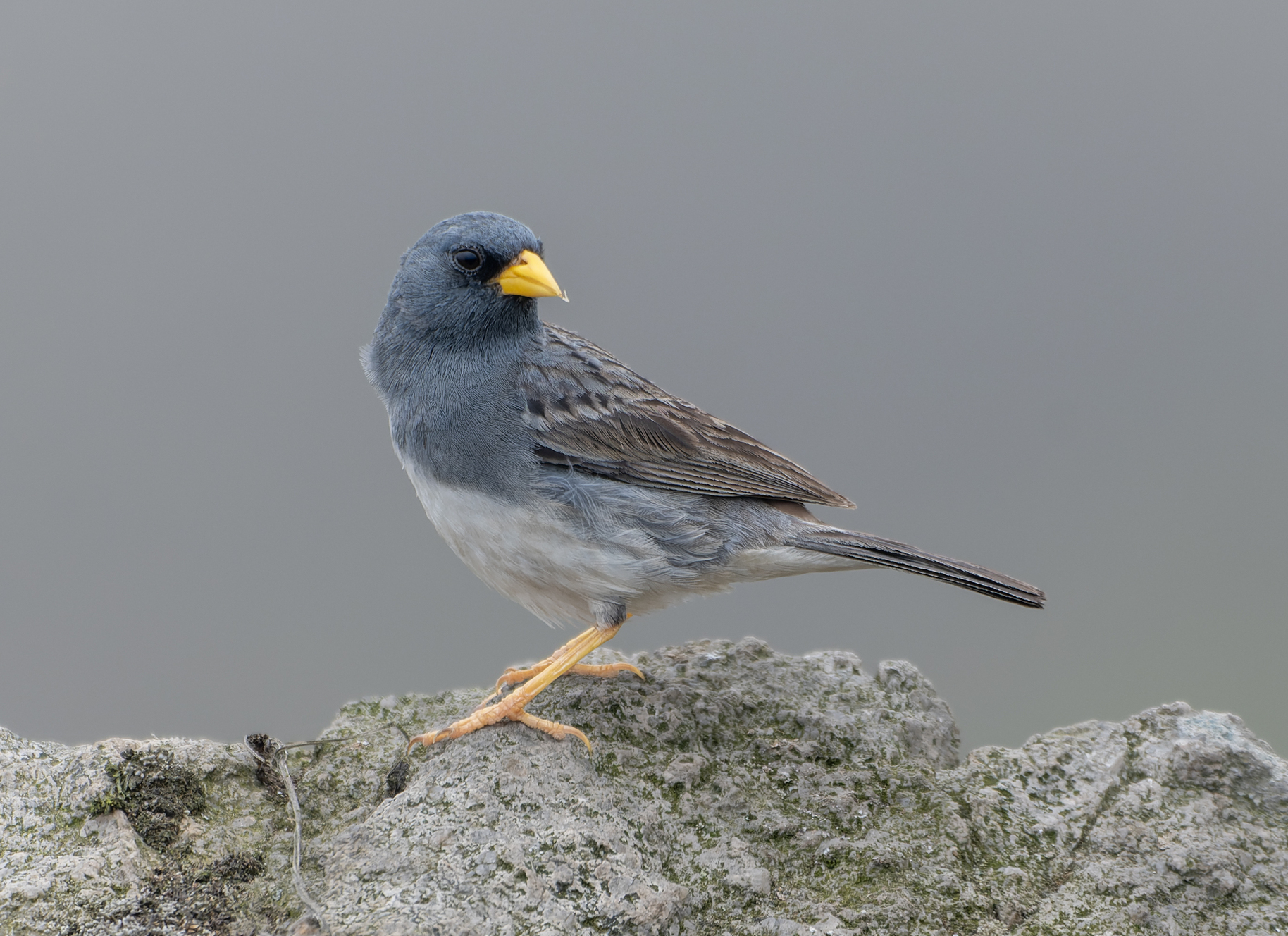

Conservation status
- Least Concern (IUCN 3.1)

Scientific classification
- Kingdom: Animalia
- Phylum: Chordata
- Class: Aves
- Order: Passeriformes
- Family: Thraupidae
- Genus: Rhopospina
- Species: R. alaudina

Binomial name
- Rhopospina alaudina (Kittlitz, 1833)
- Range of band-tailed sierra finch

Synonyms
- Fringilla alaudina von Kittlitz, 1833; Phrygilus alaudinus; Porphyrospiza alaudina

= Band-tailed sierra finch =

Species of bird

The band-tailed sierra finch (Rhopospina alaudina) is a species of bird in the family Thraupidae, the tanagers and allies. It is found in Argentina, Bolivia, Chile, Ecuador, and Peru.

== Taxonomy and systematics ==
The band-tailed sierra finch has a complicated taxonomic history that is not yet fully resolved. It was formally described in 1833 with the binomial Fringilla alaudina. By the early twentieth century it had been reassigned to the genus Phrygilus. At some time after 1993 some systems again reassigned it, this time to genus Porphyrospiza. (Note: These dates are based on the earliest and most recent dates at which the subspecies were described; all were named as subspecies of Phrygilus alaudinus) That genus was long in family Emberizidae which at the time held many New and Old World species. There it was grouped with the cardinalines which were later separated as the family Cardinalidae. A study published in 2007 showed that the genus belonged in its present tanager family Thraupidae. Beginning in 2019 most taxonomic systems began reassigning the band-tailed sierra finch to the resurrected genus Rhopospina that had been erected in 1851. However, in 2016 BirdLife International's Handbook of the Birds of the World moved it from Phrygilus to Corydospiza and as of late 2025 retains it there.

The band-tailed sierra finch has these six subspecies:

- R. a. bipartita (Zimmer, JT, 1924)
- R. a. humboldti (Koepcke, 1963)
- R. a. bracki (O'Neill & Parker, TA, 1997)
- R. a. excelsa (Berlepsch, 1907)
- R. a. alaudina (Kittlitz, 1833)
- R. a. venturii (Hartert, EJO, 1909)

== Description ==
The band-tailed sierra finch is 13.5 to 14.5 cm (5.3 to 5.7 in) long and weighs 17 to 30 g (0.60 to 1.1 oz). It is a slim bird with a long tail and a long pointed bill. The species is sexually dimorphic. Adult males of the nominate subspecies R. a. alaudina have a gray head and breast with slightly darker lores and thin darker streaks on the crown. Their upperparts are mostly lead-gray with wide blackish streaks and their rump is plain gray. Their wings are mostly blackish with a gray shoulder and gray feather edges. Their tail is partly blackish with a wide white band in the middle of all feathers except the central pair. Their breast is gray, their flanks whitish with a buffy gray tinge, and their belly and vent whitish. They have a dark brown iris, a bright orange-yellow bill, and bright orange-yellow legs and feet. Adult females have a mostly brown head heavy with darker streaks on the face and crown. Their upperparts are also brown with darker streaks. Their throat and breast are whitish buff with darker streaks on the lower throat and breast. Their flanks are buff with darker streaks and their belly and vent are off-white. Their wings are mostly brownish with cinnamon-edged tertials and buffy edges on the other flight feathers. Their tail is like the male's but with smaller white areas. Their bill, legs, and feet are a duller yellowish than those of males.

The other subspecies of the band-tailed sierra finch differ from the nominate and each other thus:

- R. a. venturii: larger and slightly darker than nominate
- R. a. excelsa: smaller than nominate with darker upperparts and breast
- R. a. bipartita: blackish chin, darker breast than excelsa, and sharp line between breast and belly
- R. a. bracki: smaller than exelsa and bipartita with richer brown streaks on paler gray upperparts and more extensive whitish on belly
- R. a. humboldti: size of bracki; same pale gray upperparts but with less rich streaks

== Distribution and habitat ==
The band-tailed sierra finch has a highly disjunct distribution, with most subspecies' ranges not adjoining another and with gaps within the ranges of some subspecies. The map does not fully match the available range descriptions. The subspecies are found thus:

- R. a. bipartita: highlands of Ecuador from southern Carchi Province south to northern Loja Province and perhaps beyond; Peru in Andes from northern Cajamarca Department to northern Lima Department and then highlands to coast from there south just into far northern Chile's Arica y Parinacota Region
- R. a. humboldti: in southwestern Ecuador's western Guayas Province and southwestern El Oro Province and into far northwestern Peru's Tumbes and northern Piura departments
- R. a. bracki: Peru in upper valley of the Huallaga River, mostly in Huánuco Department
- R. a. excelsa: highlands from southern Peru's Arequipa and Puno departments into western Bolivia
- R. a. alaudina: central Chile from southern Antofagasta Region to Los Ríos Region
- R. a. venturii: northwestern Argentina from Jujuy Province south to Mendoza Province; Córdoba and San Luis provinces

The band-tailed sierra finch inhabits somewhat different landscapes among its subspecies, though all are mostly open. In the highlands of Ecuador and Peru it mostly inhabits relatively dry montane scrublands; the habitat in the Huallaga Valley is similar. More coastally in Ecuador, Peru, and northern Chile it is in dry to arid semi-desert. Further south in Chile and in Bolivia and Argentina it is on rocky, grassy slopes with moderate amounts of shrubs. In elevation it is overall mostly found below 2,500 m (8,200 ft). It mostly ranges between 1,200 and 3,000 m (3,900 and 9,800 ft) in Ecuador but is near sea level in the far southwest. In Peru it is found at sea level in the northwest and somewhat higher elsewhere while reaching 4,000 m (13,000 ft) in the Andes.

== Behavior ==
=== Movement ===
In most of its range the band-tailed sierra finch is a sedentary year-round resident. In central Chile some downslope movement and an apparent northward shift have been observed.

=== Feeding ===
The band-tailed sierra finch feeds on mostly on seeds and smaller amounts of invertebrates. It forages on the ground and mostly singly or in pairs. It sometimes flocks with sparrows and other finch-like tanagers.

=== Breeding ===
The band-tailed sierra finch's breeding season has not been fully defined. It spans September to February in central Chile and includes May in Peru, June in Bolivia, and March in Argentina. Males make a flight display that may reach 20 m (65 ft) high and sings during the descent. The nest is made from grass and typically is on the ground at the base of a tussock. The clutch is three to five eggs that are pale pinkish to pale greenish with darker spotting. The incubation period, time to fledging, and details of parental care are not known.

=== Vocalization ===
One description of the band-tailed sierra finch's song is "a high, electric-sounding tszz-zzew zz-zzew zz-zzew; occasionally more complex in skylarking flight display". Its call is "a high ti".

== Status ==
The IUCN has assessed the band-tailed sierra finch as being of Least Concern. It has a very large range; its population size is not known but is believed to be stable. No immediate threats have been identified. It is considered "somewhat local" in Ecuador. In Peru it is local in the northwest and "more commonly found" in the central and southern parts of the country. The smallest populations are in the northwest and in the Huallanga Valley. It is common in Chile, Bolivia, and Argentina. It is found in a few protected areas.

== Gallery ==
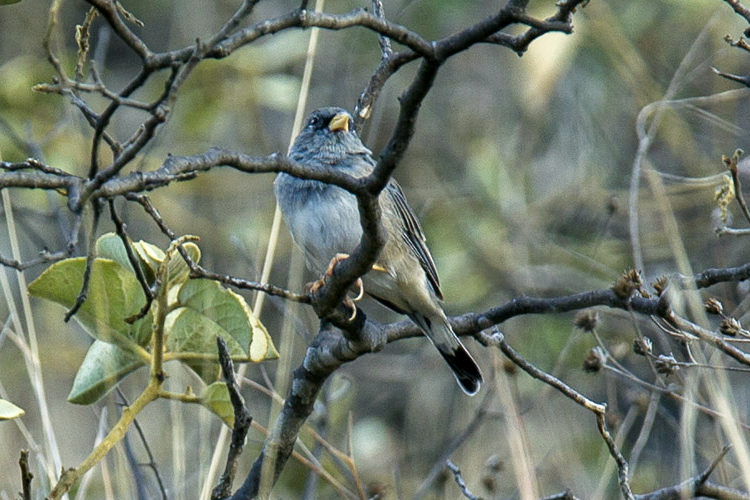
in Ecuador

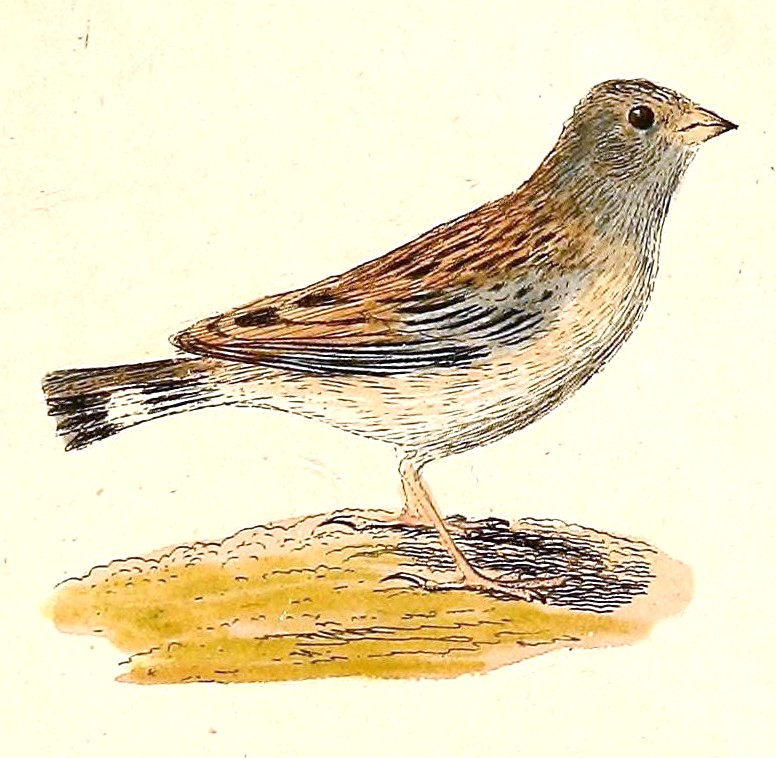
von Kittlitz's illustration (1832)
