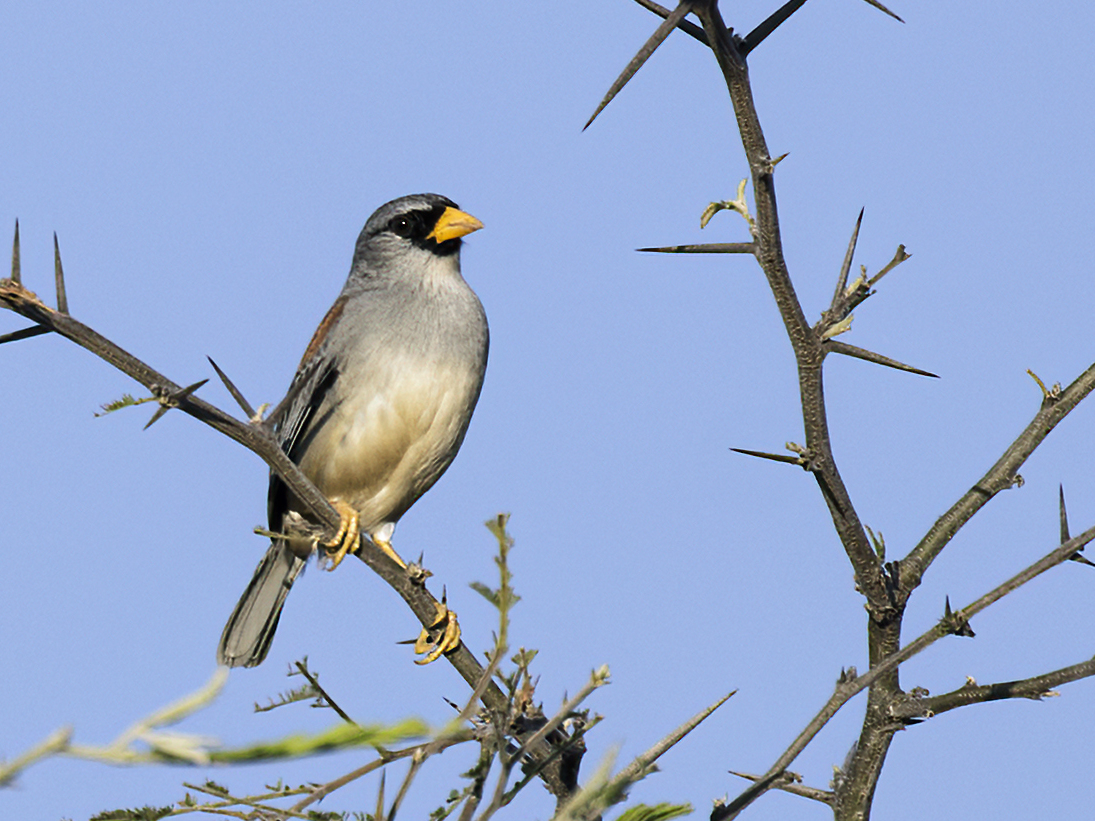

Conservation status
- Vulnerable (IUCN 3.1)

Scientific classification
- Kingdom: Animalia
- Phylum: Chordata
- Class: Aves
- Order: Passeriformes
- Family: Thraupidae
- Genus: Incaspiza
- Species: I. watkinsi

Binomial name
- Incaspiza watkinsi Chapman, 1925

= Little Inca finch =

Species of bird

The little Inca finch (Incaspiza watkinsi) is a Vulnerable species of bird in the family Thraupidae, the tanagers and allies. It is endemic to Peru.

== Taxonomy and systematics ==
The little Inca finch was formally described by Frank Chapman in 1925 with its current binomial Incaspiza watkinsi. Chapman's specific epithet honors Harry Watkins, who "for years has rendered loyal service to this museum" and who collected the type specimen. The genus Incaspiza spent time in two finch families, Fringillidae and Emberizidae, before a molecular phylogenetic study published in 2014 found that the genus belonged in the tanager family Thraupidae.

The little Inca finch is monotypic.

== Description ==
The little Inca finch is 13 cm (5.1 in) long and weighs about 20 g (0.71 oz). It has a long tail and a slim pointed bill. The species is sexually dimorphic though the sexes are very similar. Adult males have a mostly gray head and nape, black lores, and a black forecrown and mask that extends past and under the eye. Their back and rump are mostly brown with rufous scapulars and faint streaks. Their uppertail coverts are gray. Their wings are mostly black or dusky with rufous brown edges on the inner coverts and tertials and gray edges on the rest of the coverts and flight feathers. Their tail's central pair of feathers are black and the rest black with some to much white on the inner webs. Their chin and upper throat are black, their lower throat and breast are gray, their flanks have a gray wash, and their belly and undertail coverts are buff. Adult females have the same plumage pattern as males but have a browner crown and more conspicuous streaks on the back. Both sexes have a dark brown iris, a bright yellow bill, and yellow or pale brown legs and feet.

== Distribution and habitat ==
The little Inca finch is found in northwestern Peru only in the lower valley of the Marañón River and its tributaries in northeastern Cajamarca and west-central Amazonas departments. It inhabits arid scrublands with cacti and terrestrial bromeliads. In elevation it ranges between 350 and 900 m (1,100 and 3,000 ft).

== Behavior ==
=== Movement ===
The little Inca finch is a sedentary year-round resident.

=== Feeding ===
The little Inca finch's diet has not been studied but appears to include seeds. It forages on the ground, usually singly or in pairs.

=== Breeding ===
The little Inca finch's breeding season apparently includes at least from February to April but nothing else is known about the species' breeding biology.

=== Vocalization ===
The little Inca finch's song is "a high, thin tsee-TSEW! swee?" and its call is "high tseet notes".

== Status ==
The IUCN originally in 1994 assessed the little Inca finch as Near Threatened and since 2021 as Vulnerable. It has a very restricted range and its estimated population of between 250 and 1000 mature individuals is believed to be decreasing. "The Marañón drainage has been cultivated for many years and its native habitats have progressively deteriorated. The spread of cultivations, plantations and cattle ranching are serious threats within its limited range, and oil extraction is a potential future problem. The habitat is further degraded through forest cutting for firewood and charcoal production."
