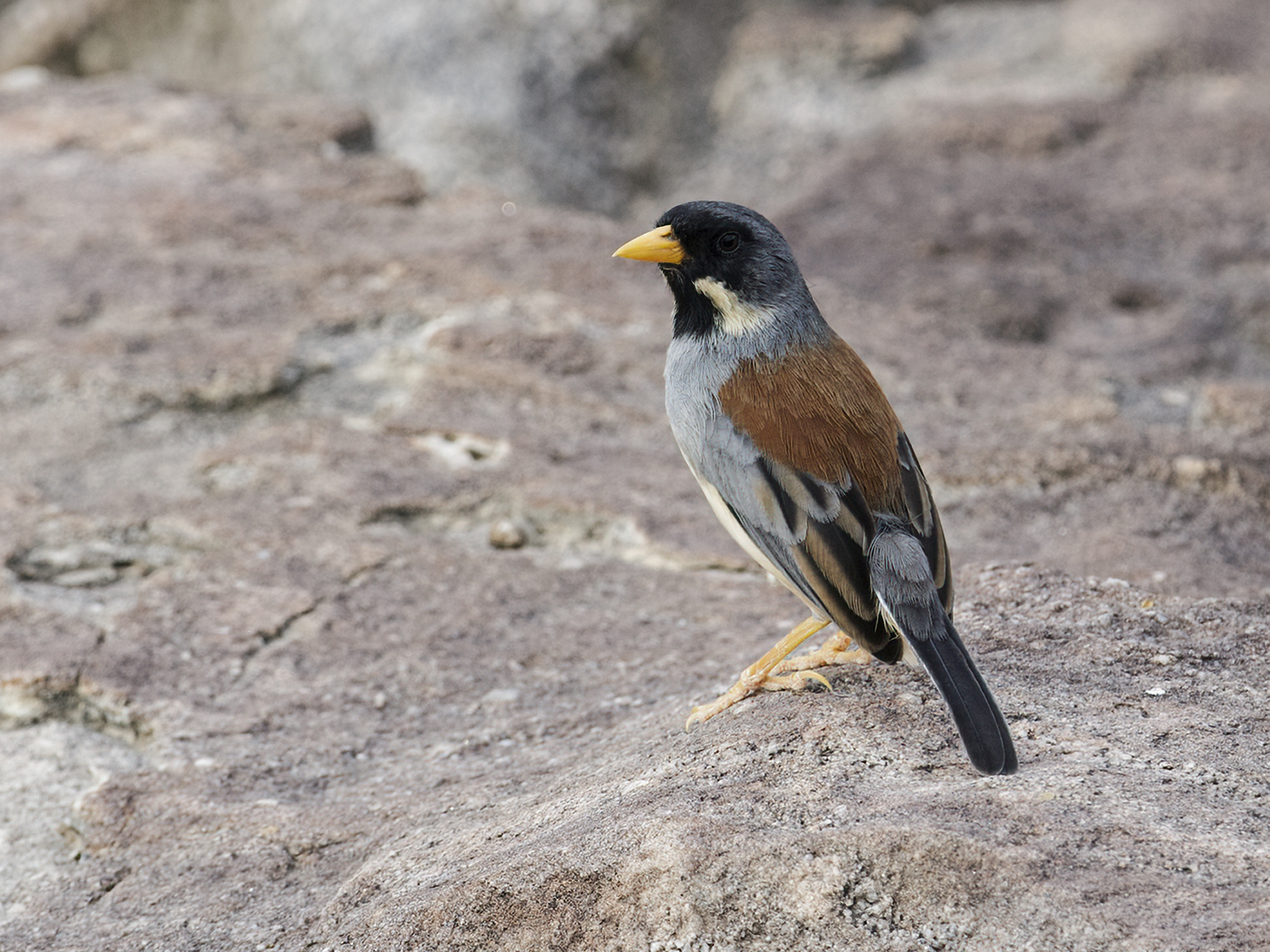

Conservation status
- Least Concern (IUCN 3.1)

Scientific classification
- Kingdom: Animalia
- Phylum: Chordata
- Class: Aves
- Order: Passeriformes
- Family: Thraupidae
- Genus: Incaspiza
- Species: I. laeta

Binomial name
- Incaspiza laeta (Salvin, 1895)

= Buff-bridled Inca finch =

Species of bird

The buff-bridled Inca finch (Incaspiza laeta) is a species of bird in the family Thraupidae, the tanagers and allies. It is endemic to Peru.

== Taxonomy and systematics ==
The buff-bridled Inca finch was formally described in 1895 with the binomial Haemophila laeta. It was later reassigned to its present genus Incaspiza that had been erected in 1898. A molecular phylogenetic study published in 2014 found that Incaspiza belonged in the tanager family Thraupidae.

The buff-bridled Inca finch is monotypic.

== Description ==
The buff-bridled Inca finch is 14.5 cm (5.7 in) long and weighs 19.5 to 23.5 g (0.69 to 0.83 oz). It has a long tail and a slim pointed bill. The species is sexually dimorphic though the sexes are very similar. Adult males have a mostly gray head and nape, black lores, a black forehead and mask that extends past and under the eye, and the eponymous large pale buff spot on the lower cheek. Their mantle, back, and scapulars are rufous and their rump and uppertail coverts grayish. Their wings are mostly gray with browner edges on the tertials. Their tail is black with white edges on the outer feathers. Their throat is black, their breast gray, their flanks and belly buff, and their vent off-white. Adult females have the same plumage pattern as males but are duller overall and have a brown tinge on the crown and nape. Both sexes have a dark brown iris, a bright orange-yellow bill, and orange-yellow legs and feet.

== Distribution and habitat ==
The buff-bridled Inca finch is found in northwestern Peru in the middle and upper watersheds of the Marañón River. Its range extends from southern Cajamarca and southwestern Amazonas departments south to eastern La Libertad, northeastern Ancash, and extreme northwestern Huánuco departments. It inhabits dry to arid woodlands with Bombax trees, cacti, and thorn scrub. In elevation it ranges between 1,000 and 2,750 m (3,300 and 9,000 ft).

== Behavior ==
=== Movement ===
The buff-bridled Inca finch is a sedentary year-round resident.

=== Feeding ===
The buff-bridled Inca finch's diet has not been studied. It forages on the ground or in bushes and trees, and usually singly or in pairs.

=== Breeding ===
The buff-bridled Inca finch's breeding season apparently spans at least from mid-April to mid-June but nothing else is known about the species' breeding biology.

=== Vocalization ===
The buff-bridled Inca finch's call is "a high tsee". When annoyed it also gives a "dry rasping, scold like that of a wren (Troglodytidae)". Its song has not been described.

== Status ==
The IUCN has assessed the buff-bridled Inca finch as being of Least Concern. It has a limited range; its population size is not known and is believed to be decreasing. No immediate threats have been identified. It is considered fairly common in that small range.
