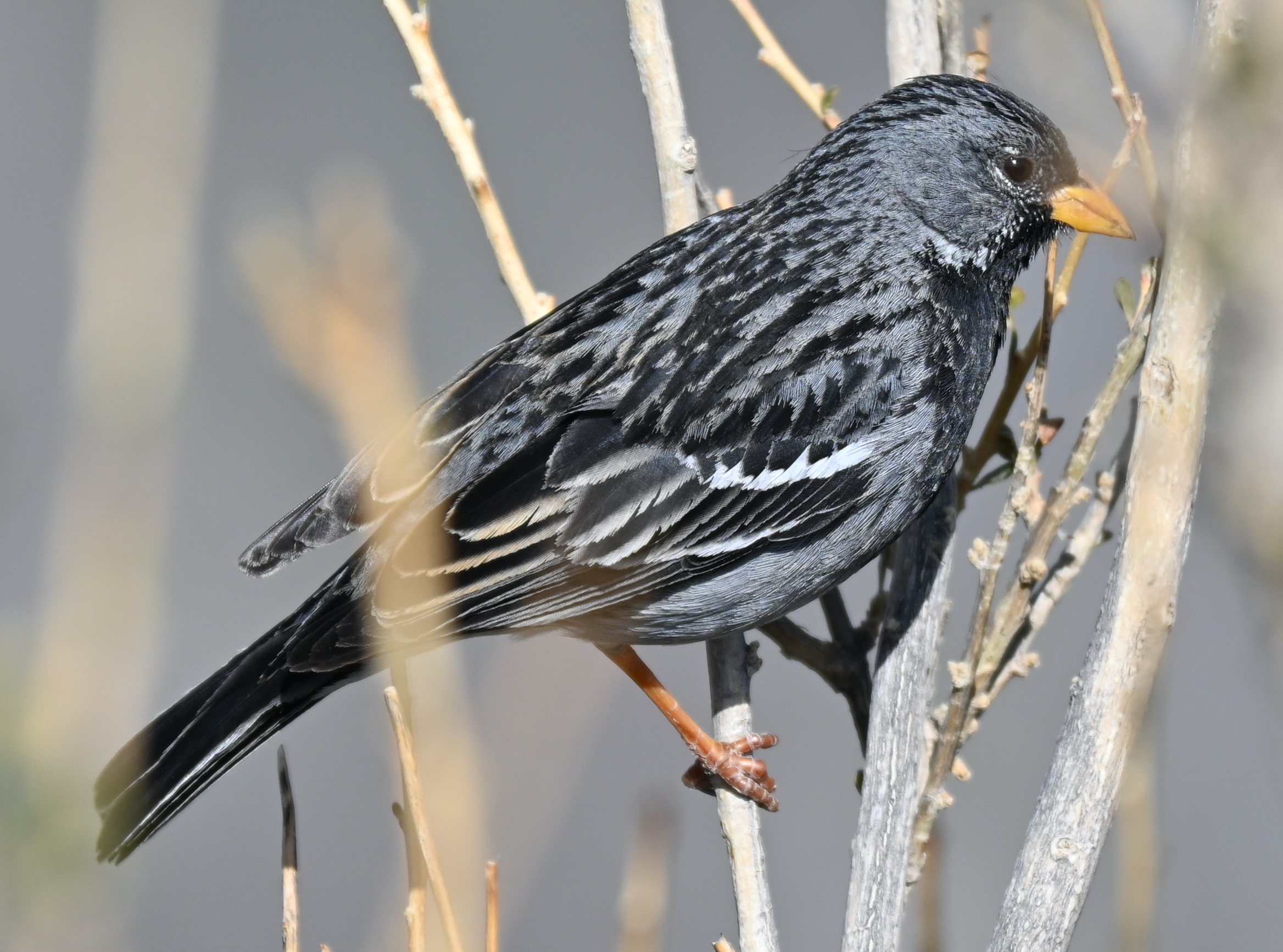
- Mourning sierra finch (Rhopospina piranganus)

Scientific classification
- Kingdom: Animalia
- Phylum: Chordata
- Class: Aves
- Order: Passeriformes
- Family: Thraupidae
- Genus: Rhopospina; Cabanis, 1851

Species
- Rhopospina fruticeti; Rhopospina caerulescens; Rhopospina alaudina; Rhopospina carbonaria

= Rhopospina =

Genus of birds

Rhopospina is a small genus of finch-like tanagers found in grassy areas in Central and South America.

== Taxonomy and species list ==
The genus contains the following four species:

Genus Rhopospina – Cabanis, 1851 – four species
Common name	Scientific name and subspecies	Range	Size and ecology	IUCN status and estimated population
Mourning sierra finch	Rhopospina fruticeti (Kittlitz, 1833) Three subspecies: R. f. peruviana (Zimmer, JT, 1924); R. f. coracina (Sclater, PL, 1891); R. f. fruticeti (Kittlitz, 1833)	Argentina, Bolivia, Chile and Peru. Vagrant to the Falkland Islands and Brazil	Size: Habitat: Diet:	LC
Blue finch	Rhopospina caerulescens (Wied-Neuwied, M, 1830)	Brazil and northeastern Bolivia	Size: Habitat: Diet:	NT
Band-tailed sierra finch	Rhopospina alaudina (Kittlitz, 1833)	Argentina, Bolivia, Chile, Ecuador, and Peru	Size: Habitat: Diet:	LC
Carbonated sierra finch	Rhopospina carbonaria (Lafresnaye & d'Orbigny, 1837)	Argentina	Size: Habitat: Diet:	LC
