= Hemispingus =

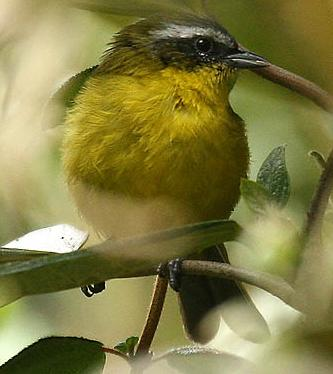
Superciliaried hemispingus (Thlypopsis superciliaris)

Hemispingus is a former scientific genus name of slender-billed tanagers in the family Thraupidae in highland forest in South America, especially in the Andes. The name is retained in the common name for several species of birds previously included in the genus:

- Black-headed hemispingus Pseudospingus verticalis, syn. Hemispingus verticalis
- Drab hemispingus Pseudospingus xanthophthalmus, syn. Hemispingus xanthophthalmus
- Slaty-backed hemispingus Poospiza goeringi, syn. Hemispingus goeringi
- Rufous-browed hemispingus Poospiza rufosuperciliaris, syn. Hemispingus rufosuperciliaris
- Grey-capped hemispingus Kleinothraupis reyi, syn. Hemispingus reyi
- Black-capped hemispingus Kleinothraupis atropileus, syn. Hemispingus atropileus
- White-browed hemispingus Kleinothraupis auricularis, syn. Hemispingus auricularis
- Orange-browed hemispingus Kleinothraupis calophrys, syn. Hemispingus calophrys
- Parodi's hemispingus Kleinothraupis parodii, syn. Hemispingus parodii
- Oleaginous hemispingus Sphenopsis frontalis, syn. Hemispingus frontalis
- Black-eared hemispingus Sphenopsis melanotis, syn. Hemispingus melanotis
- Western hemispingus Sphenopsis ochracea, syn. Hemispingus ochraceus
- Piura hemispingus Sphenopsis piurae, syn. Hemispingus piurae
- Superciliaried hemispingus Thlypopsis superciliaris, syn. Hemispingus superciliaris
- Three-striped hemispingus Microspingus trifasciatus, syn. Hemispingus trifasciatus

The genus Hemispingus, described by Cabanis in 1851 for Hemispingus superciliaris, became superfluous when a molecular phylogenetic study published in 2014 found that this species was embedded in the larger genus Thlypopsis. The name means "half finch", from Greek, hemi, half, and spingos, a finch.
