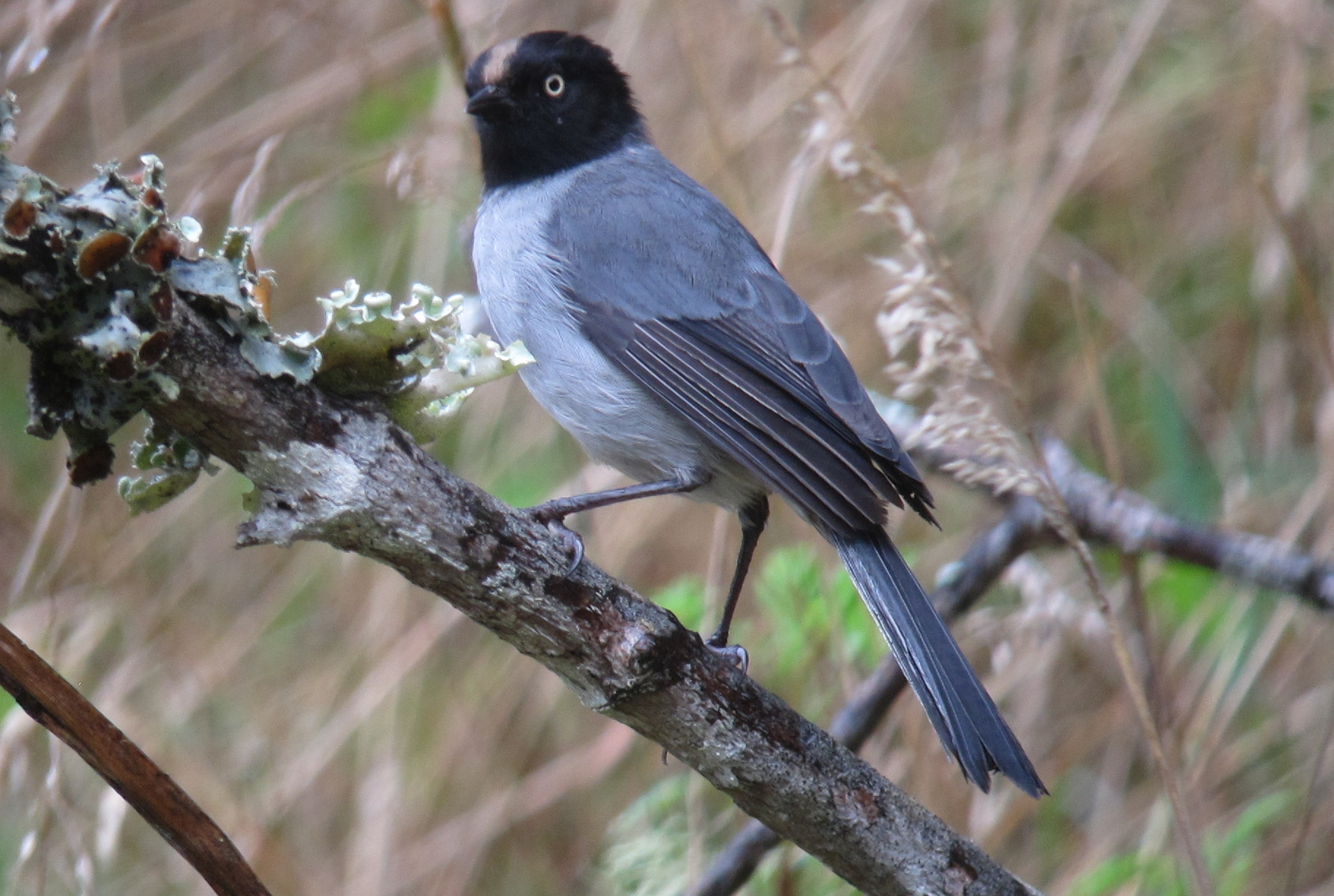
- Black-headed hemispingus (Pseudospingus verticalis)

Scientific classification
- Kingdom: Animalia
- Phylum: Chordata
- Class: Aves
- Order: Passeriformes
- Family: Thraupidae
- Genus: Pseudospingus; Berlepsch & Stolzmann, 1896

Type species
- Dacnis xanthophthalma Taczanowski, 1874

Species
- See text

= Pseudospingus =

Genus of birds

Pseudospingus is a genus of warbler-like birds in the tanager family Thraupidae. They are found in highland forests in South America.

== Taxonomy and species list ==
The two species now placed in this genus were formerly assigned to the genus Hemispingus. A molecular phylogenetic study published in 2014 found that Hemispingus was polyphyletic and as part of the subsequent rearrangement, the genus Pseudospingus was resurrected for these two species. The genus had been introduced by Hans von Berlepsch and Jean Stolzmann in 1896. The type species was subsequently designated as the drab hemispingus. The name Pseudospingus comes from Ancient Greek ψεύδος (pseúdos), meaning "false", and σπίγγος (spíngos), meaning "finch".

== Species ==
The genus contains the following two species:

Genus Pseudospingus – Berlepsch & Stolzmann, 1896 – two species
Common name	Scientific name and subspecies	Range	Size and ecology	IUCN status and estimated population
Drab hemispingus	Pseudospingus xanthophthalmus (Taczanowski, 1874)	Bolivia and Peru.	Size: Habitat: Diet:	LC
Black-headed hemispingus	Pseudospingus verticalis (Lafresnaye, 1840)	Colombia, Ecuador, Peru, and Venezuela.	Size: Habitat: Diet:	LC
