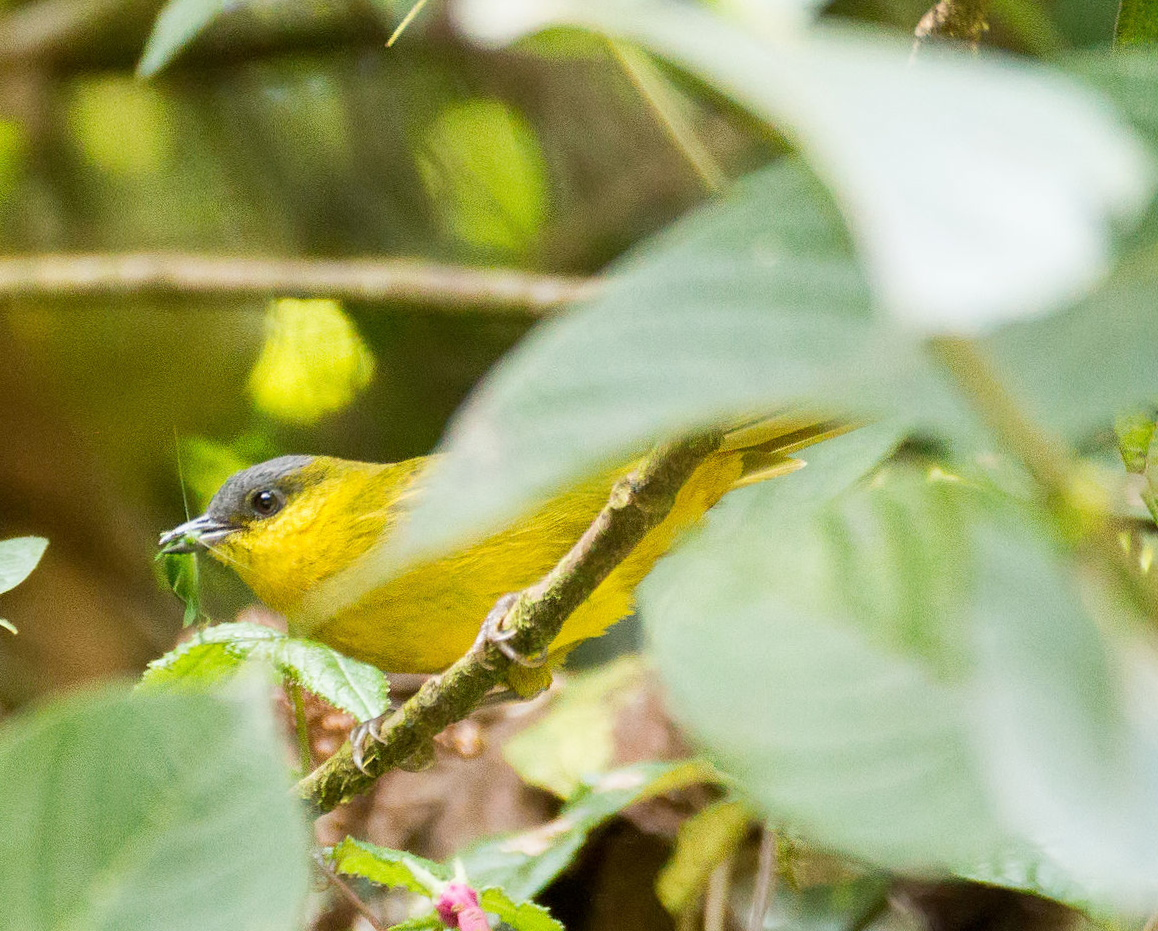
- Grey-capped hemispingus (Kleinothraupis reyi)

Scientific classification
- Kingdom: Animalia
- Phylum: Chordata
- Class: Aves
- Order: Passeriformes
- Family: Thraupidae
- Genus: Kleinothraupis; Burns, Unitt & Mason, 2016

Type species
- Arremon atropileus Lafresnaye, 1842

Species
- See text

= Kleinothraupis =

Genus of birds

Kleinothraupis is a genus of warbler-like birds in the tanager family Thraupidae. They are found in highland forest in South America.

== Taxonomy and species list ==
The five species now placed in this genus were formerly assigned to the genus Hemispingus. A molecular phylogenetic study published in 2014 found that Hemispingus was polyphyletic. As part of the subsequent rearrangement, the five species were assigned to a new genus Kleinothraupis that was erected with the black-capped hemispingus as the type species. The name Kleinothraupis was chosen in honour of the ornithologist Nedra K. Klein whose name is combined with the Ancient Greek θραυπίς (thraupis), an unidentified small bird mentioned by Aristotle. In ornithology thraupis is used to signify a tanager.

The genus contains the following five species:

Genus Kleinothraupis – Burns, Unitt & Mason, 2016 – five species
Common name	Scientific name and subspecies	Range	Size and ecology	IUCN status and estimated population
Grey-capped hemispingus	Kleinothraupis reyi (Berlepsch, 1885)	Endemic to the Venezuelan Andes, from northern Táchira north through Trujillo almost to the Lara border	Size: 14–15 cm (5.5–5.9 in) Habitat: Interior and edges of wet, moss-laden montane forest, almost always in or near stands of Chusquea bamboo; 2,300–3,200 m (7,500–10,500 ft), most numerous at 2,150–3,000 m (7,100–9,800 ft) Diet: Diet not studied but apparently mostly small arthropods; forages 2–8 m (6.6–26 ft) above the ground, hopping along branches and bamboo stems, taking prey mostly from the upper surface of leaves and sometimes hanging upside down; in pairs or groups of its own species that can number more than 20, in mixed-species flocks, sometimes as the core species	NT Stable; population size not known
Black-capped hemispingus	Kleinothraupis atropileus (Lafresnaye, 1842)	Andes of Venezuela, Colombia and Ecuador, south to far northwestern Peru	Size: 15–16 cm (5.9–6.3 in); 18–26 g (0.63–0.92 oz) Habitat: Moist montane and dwarf forests with large amounts of Chusquea bamboo; 1,800–3,600 m (5,900–11,800 ft) Diet:	LC Decreasing
White-browed hemispingus (Note: Sometimes treated as a subspecies of the black-capped hemispingus.)	Kleinothraupis auricularis (Cabanis, 1873)	Peru south of the Marañón River	Size: Habitat: Diet:	LC Decreasing
Orange-browed hemispingus	Kleinothraupis calophrys (Sclater & Salvin, 1876)	East side of the Andes, from a small area of southeastern Peru's Puno Department south into western and central Bolivia's La Paz and Cochabamba departments	Size: 14–16 cm (5.5–6.3 in); 14.5–20.5 g (0.51–0.72 oz) Habitat: Interior and edges of wet montane forest and elfin forest, almost always in or near stands of Chusquea bamboo; also dense vegetation on landslides; 2,300–3,350 m (7,500–11,000 ft) Diet: Primarily arthropods, with small amounts of vegetable matter; forages mostly in bamboo, taking prey from leaves and branches up to about 6 m (20 ft) above the ground, in pairs or groups of up to about 8, regularly joining mixed-species flocks	LC Decreasing; population size not known
Parodi's hemispingus	Kleinothraupis parodii (Weske & Terborgh, 1974)	Endemic to the eastern slope of the Andes of Peru, primarily in Cuzco Department and slightly into adjoining Junín, Madre de Dios and Puno departments, from the Cordillera Vilcabamba to the upper valley of the Urubamba River	Size: 14–16 cm (5.5–6.3 in); one specimen 21.8 g (0.77 oz) Habitat: Humid elfin forest, greatly favouring stands of Chusquea bamboo; 2,600–3,500 m (8,500–11,500 ft) Diet: Diet not studied but assumed to be mostly or entirely arthropods; gleans from leaves and bamboo stems in bamboo and small trees fairly low to the ground, in pairs or groups of up to 9, regularly joining mixed-species flocks	NT Decreasing; population size not known
