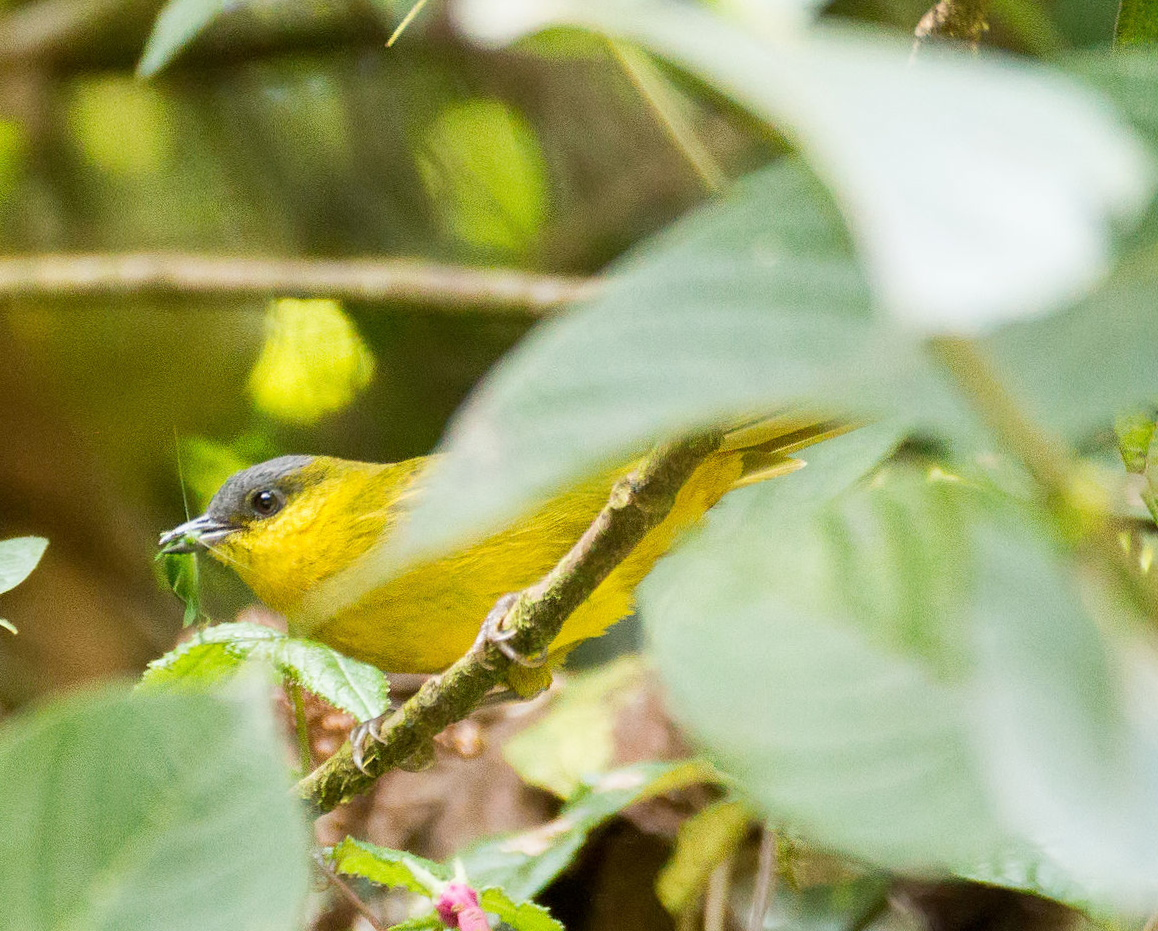

Conservation status
- Near Threatened (IUCN 3.1)

Scientific classification
- Kingdom: Animalia
- Phylum: Chordata
- Class: Aves
- Order: Passeriformes
- Family: Thraupidae
- Genus: Kleinothraupis
- Species: K. reyi

Binomial name
- Kleinothraupis reyi (Berlepsch, 1885)

= Grey-capped hemispingus =

Species of bird

The grey-capped hemispingus (Kleinothraupis reyi) is a Near Threatened species of bird in the family Thraupidae, the tanagers and allies. It is endemic to Venezuela.

== Taxonomy and systematics ==
The grey-capped hemispingus has a somewhat complicated taxonomic history. It was formally described in 1885 with the binomial Chlorospingus reyi. By 1938 it had been reassigned to the genus Hemispingus. Based largely on a 2016 publication, taxonomic systems transferred H. reyi to its present genus Kleinothraupis.

The grey-capped hemispingus is monotypic.

== Description ==
The grey-capped hemispingus is 14 to 15 cm (5.5 to 5.9 in) long. The sexes have the same plumage. Adults have a gray crown and nape to the bottom of the eye that give a hooded appearance; the rest of their face is olive-yellow. Their upperparts, tail, and wing coverts are bright yellowish olive. Their flight feathers are dusky with yellowish olive edges. Their throat and underparts are yellow with an olive tinge on the sides and flanks. They have a dark brown iris, a small slender dark gray bill, and grayish horn legs.

== Distribution and habitat ==
The grey-capped hemispingus is found in the Venezuelan Andes from northern Táchira north through Trujillo almost to the Lara border. It inhabits the interior and edges of wet, moss-laden, montane forest where it is almost always found in or near stands of Chusquea bamboo. In elevation it ranges between 2,300 and 3,200 m (7,500 and 10,500 ft) and is most numerous between 2,150 and 3,000 m (7,100 and 9,800 ft).

== Behavior ==
=== Movement ===
The grey-capped hemispingus is a year-round resident.

=== Feeding ===
The grey-capped hemispingus' diet has not been studied but it appears to feed mostly on small arthropods. It usually is seen in pairs or in groups of its own species that can number more than 20 individuals. The groups forage as members of mixed-species feeding flocks and sometimes it is the core species of them. It typically forages between about 2 and 8 m (7 and 26 ft) above the ground, methodically hopping along branches and bamboo stems. It takes prey mostly from the upper surface of leaves, reaching from a perch when necessary, and sometimes hanging upside down.

=== Breeding ===
Nothing is known about the grey-capped hemispingus' breeding biology.

=== Vocalization ===
What is thought to be the grey-capped hemispingus' song is a "sharp, insistent tee chew chew or stit-sit, seet!". It makes "buzzy bzit notes" while foraging; its other calls include "a high, thin seep, longer seeeep, and thin chittering notes".

== Status ==
The IUCN originally in 1988 assessed the grey-capped hemispingus as being of Least Concern but since 2000 as Near Threatened. It has a small range; its population size is not known but is believed to be stable. "Large tracts of forest remain within its range. However, forests in lower elevations outside the range and outside of protected areas are under pressure from human settlements and conversion for cattle-ranching and agricultural cultivation; continued encroachment may affect the species' range in the future." It is considered fairly common. Its range includes the Sierra Nevada National Park in Mérida; the park includes a large intact area of montane forest.
