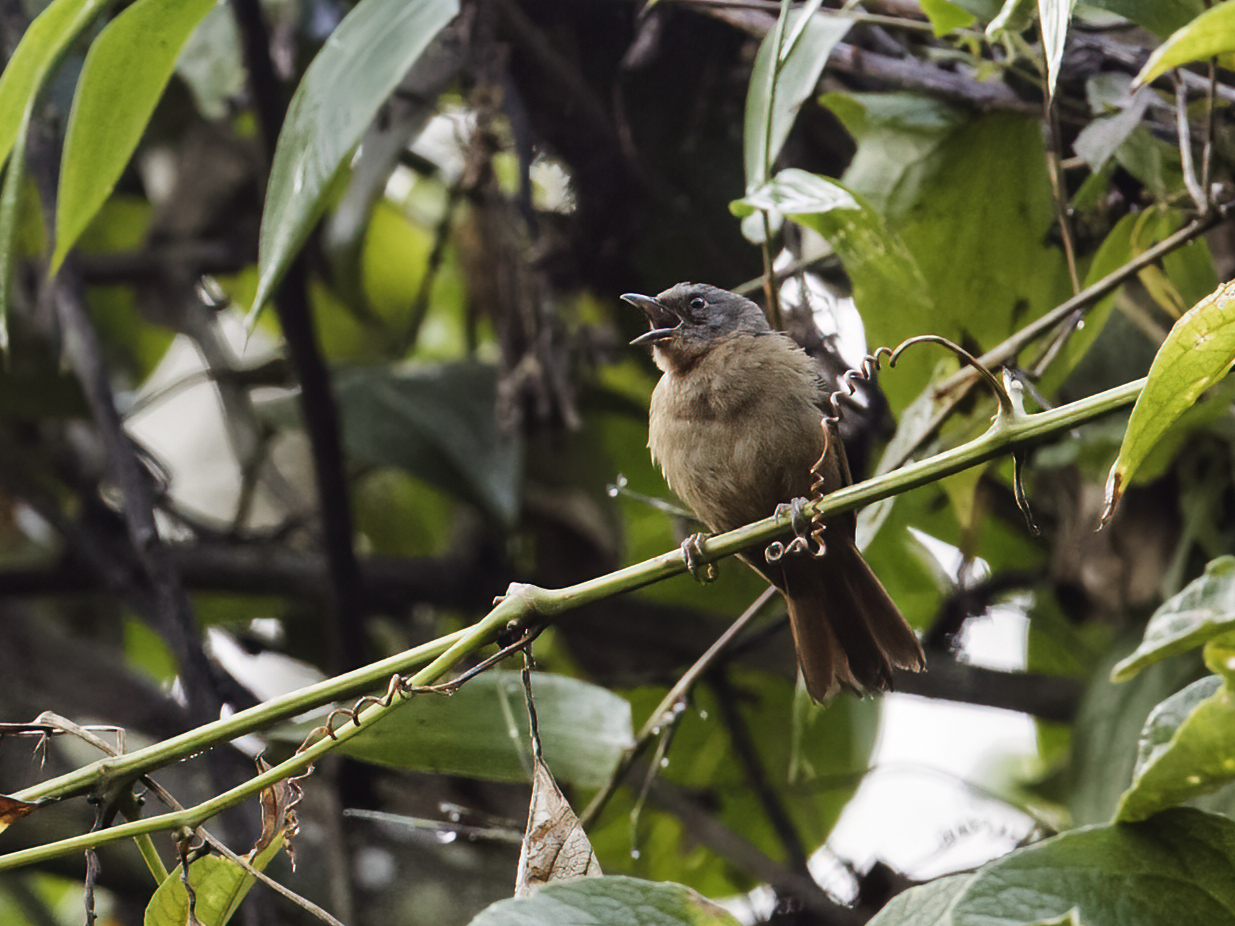

Conservation status
- Least Concern (IUCN 3.1)

Scientific classification
- Kingdom: Animalia
- Phylum: Chordata
- Class: Aves
- Order: Passeriformes
- Family: Thraupidae
- Genus: Sphenopsis
- Species: S. ochracea

Binomial name
- Sphenopsis ochracea (Berlepsch & Taczanowski, 1884)

= Western hemispingus =

Species of bird

The western hemispingus (Sphenopsis ochracea) is a species of bird in the family Thraupidae, the tanagers and allies. It is found in Colombia and Ecuador.

== Taxonomy and systematics ==
The western hemispingus has a complicated taxonomic history that as of October 2026 had not been fully resolved. It was formally described in 1884 with the binomial Chlorospingus ochraceus. By 1938 it had been reassigned to the genus Hemispingus as subspecies H. melanotis ochraceus of the black-eared hemispingus. By 2014 at least one taxonomic system had again recognized it as a full species. Based largely on a 2016 publication, taxonomic systems transferred H. ochracea (as a species) and H. melanotis (with or without ochraceus as a subspecies) to their present genus Sphenopsis.

As of mid-October 2026, the most recent versions of the IOC, AviList, and Handbook of the Birds of the World taxonomies treat ocracea as the full species western hemispingus. However, the Clements taxonomy and the South American Classification Committee retain it as a subspecies of the black-eared hemispingus. Though AviList has adopted the western hemispingus as a species, the authors state, "Given the complex patterns of plumage variation in [the black-eared hemispingus complex], further research on species limits is warranted."

This article treats the western hemispingus as a species.

== Description ==
The western hemispingus is about 14.5 cm (5.7 in) long. The sexes have the same plumage. Adults have a dark neutral gray crown and a mostly dusky to dusky brown face. Their nape is neutral gray and their back and wings dark brownish olive. Their tail is olive-brown with a slightly darker upper surface. Their throat is tawny olive, their breast clay-colored, their belly tawny olive, and their undertail coverts cinnamon. They have a dark brown iris, a small, slender, black bill, and light brown legs.

== Distribution and habitat ==
The western hemispingus is found in far southwestern Colombia's Nariño Department and south intermittently along the western Andean slope in Ecuador to Azuay Province. It inhabits thick undergrowth in humid forest and woodlands. Unlike the black-eared hemispingus, it does not appear to favor stands of bamboo. In Ecuador it ranges in elevation between 1,600 and 2,200 m (5,200 and 7,200 ft).

== Behavior ==
=== Movement ===
The western hemispingus is a year-round resident.

=== Feeding ===
The western hemispingus' diet has not been studied. It forages in the forest undergrowth, usually in pairs or small groups, and regularly joins mixed-species feeding flocks.

=== Breeding ===
Nothing is known about the western hemispingus' breeding biology.

=== Vocalization ===
The western hemispingus' song has been recorded but apparently not described in detail. It is reported to be similar to that of the black-eared hemispingus, which see here.

== Status ==
The IUCN has assessed the western hemispingus as being of Least Concern. It has a small range; its population size is not known and is believed to be decreasing. No immediate threats have been identified. It is considered "rare and local" in Ecuador.
