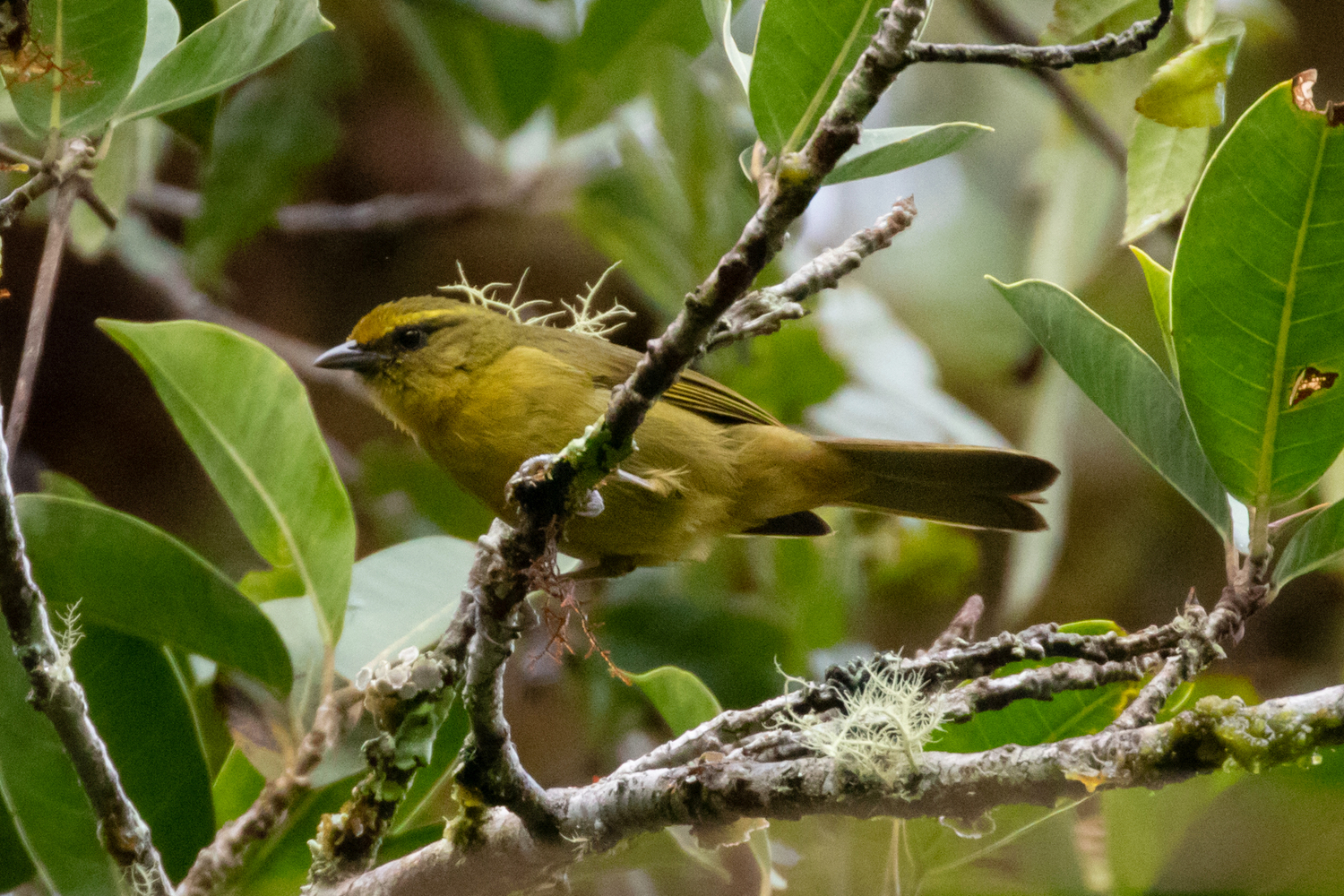

Conservation status
- Least Concern (IUCN 3.1)

Scientific classification
- Kingdom: Animalia
- Phylum: Chordata
- Class: Aves
- Order: Passeriformes
- Family: Thraupidae
- Genus: Sphenopsis
- Species: S. frontalis

Binomial name
- Sphenopsis frontalis (Tschudi, 1844)

= Oleaginous hemispingus =

Species of bird

The oleaginous hemispingus (Sphenopsis frontalis) is a species of bird in the family Thraupidae, the tanagers and allies. It is found in Colombia, Ecuador, Peru, and Venezuela.

== Taxonomy and systematics ==
The oleaginous hemispingus was formally described by the Swiss naturalist Johann Jakob von Tschudi in 1844 with the binomial Hylophilus frontalis. Tschudi mistakenly believed it to be a vireo. By 1938 it had been reassigned to the genus Hemispingus in the tanager family and included four subspecies. At that time the type specimen was noted as from the "east slope of [the] Peruvian Andes, probably in [the] Department of Junín". Based largely on a 2016 publication, taxonomic systems transferred H. frontalis to its present genus Sphenopsis.

The oleaginous hemispingus has these five subspecies:

- S. f. ignobilis (Sclater, PL, 1862)
- S. f. flavidorsalis (Phelps, WH & Phelps, WH Jr, 1953)
- S. f. hanieli (Hellmayr & Seilern, 1914)
- S. f. iterata Chapman, 1925
- S. f. frontalis (Tschudi, 1844)

Some authors have suggested that all except S. f. frontalis might be treated as a separate species. Others have to a degree supported the suggestion, saying, "in reality all four Venezuelan races differ fairly clearly from nominate [S. f. frontalis]" but that further review is needed.

Within the species, the Clements taxonomy groups S. f. frontalis and S. f. ignobilis as the "oleaginous hemispingus (Andean)" and groups S. f. hanieli and S. f. iterata as the "oleaginous hemispingus (Venezuelan)". It calls S. f. flavidorsalis the "oleaginous hemispingus (Perija)".

The species' English name derives from its dominant olive color, "having the property or appearance of oil — [oleaginous] is derived from olive".

== Description ==
The oleaginous hemispingus is about 14 cm (5.5 in) long and weighs 14 to 20 g (0.49 to 0.71 oz). The sexes have the same plumage. Adults of the nominate subspecies S. f. frontalis have a dirty olive crown, a long, thin, weak yellowish supercilium, a darker line through the eye, and dirty olive ear coverts. Their upperparts, tail, and upperwing coverts are dirty olive. Their flight feathers are dirty olive with thin cinnamon edges. Their throat and underparts are mostly dingy olive-yellow with somewhat more olive sides and a cinnamon tinge on the undertail coverts. Juveniles have no supercilium and are overall duller and dinger than adults.

Subspecies S. f. hanieli has a brighter, more visible supercilium and more yellow-ochre underparts than the nominate. S. f. iterata is also more yellow-ochre below than the nominate, and has a rich buff to orange-buff supercilium and throat. S. f. ignobilis has a greenish yellow supercilium and a pale buffy throat with a clear division from the breast. S. f. flavidorsalis has more olive upperparts than the nominate, with olive-green edges on the flight feathers and a buff-yellow tinge on the supercilium and throat. All subspecies have a dark brown iris, a dusky gray bill, and pale brownish to brownish gray legs.

== Distribution and habitat ==
The oleaginous hemispingus has a highly disjunct distribution. The subspecies are found thus:

- S. f. frontalis: all three ranges of the Colombian Andes, though not continuously in most; in Ecuador locally in the northwest and mostly continuously along the eastern slope of the Andes; and in Peru slightly into Piura Department from Ecuador and on the eastern Andean slope from central Amazonas Department south to central Cuzco Department
- S. f. ignobilis: Venezuelan Andes from southern Táchira south to Lara state
- S. f. flavidorsalis: Serranía del Perijá straddling the Colombia-Venezuela border
- S. f. hanieli: Venezuelan Coastal Range in Aragua and Miranda states and probably the Capital District
- S. f. iterata: northeastern Venezuela along the border of Sucre and Monagas states

The oleaginous hemispingus primarily inhabits the interior of moist montane forest where it favors thick and dense vegetation and vine tangles. It is found less frequently at the forest's edges. In elevation it ranges between 1,600 and 2,900 m (5,200 and 9,500 ft) in Venezuela, between 1,500 and 3,200 m (4,900 and 10,500 ft) in Colombia, mostly between 1,500 and 2,500 m (4,900 and 8,200 ft) in Ecuador, and between 1,500 and 2,600 m (4,900 and 8,500 ft) in Peru.

== Behavior ==
=== Movement ===
The oleaginous hemispingus is a year-round resident.

=== Feeding ===
The oleaginous hemispingus feeds on arthropods. It forages in pairs or groups of up to about eight of its species. It regularly joins mixed-species feeding flocks in the forest's understory and is sometimes the dominant species. It takes much prey from clumps of dead leaves, sometimes acrobatically hanging upside down to search them, and also takes prey from live leaves.

=== Breeding ===
The oleaginous hemispingus' breeding season has not been defined. However, it appears to span June to November in northwestern Venezuela and northeastern Colombia, and to include April in Peru. Its eggs are reported as white. Nothing else is known about the species' breeding biology.

=== Vocalization ===
The oleaginous hemispingus' song in Venezuela is described as a "chattery stream of high-pitched, chipping notes, chipa'chipa'chip-chit'chit'chit'chit'it'it'it..., accelerating then slowing". Several birds in a group may sing almost simultaneously, "producing [a] vibrating chorus". There its call is "soft chit notes". Another description, from Peru, is "an accelerating series of nasal enk notes and chips that can become a chatter of musical chipping notes" enk enk-enkenk-paCHEER pa-CHEER pa-CHEER". There it makes a "metallic tip" call.

== Status ==
The IUCN has assessed the oleaginous hemispingus as being of Least Concern. It has a very large range; its population size is not known and is believed to be decreasing. No immediate threats have been identified. It is considered "fairly common...but easily overlooked" in Venezuela, "locally common" in Colombia, "scarce" in Ecuador, and "uncommon to locally fairly common" in Peru. It occurs "in numerous protected sites in much of [its] range, although increasing human settlement and deforestation may place this species at risk elsewhere".
