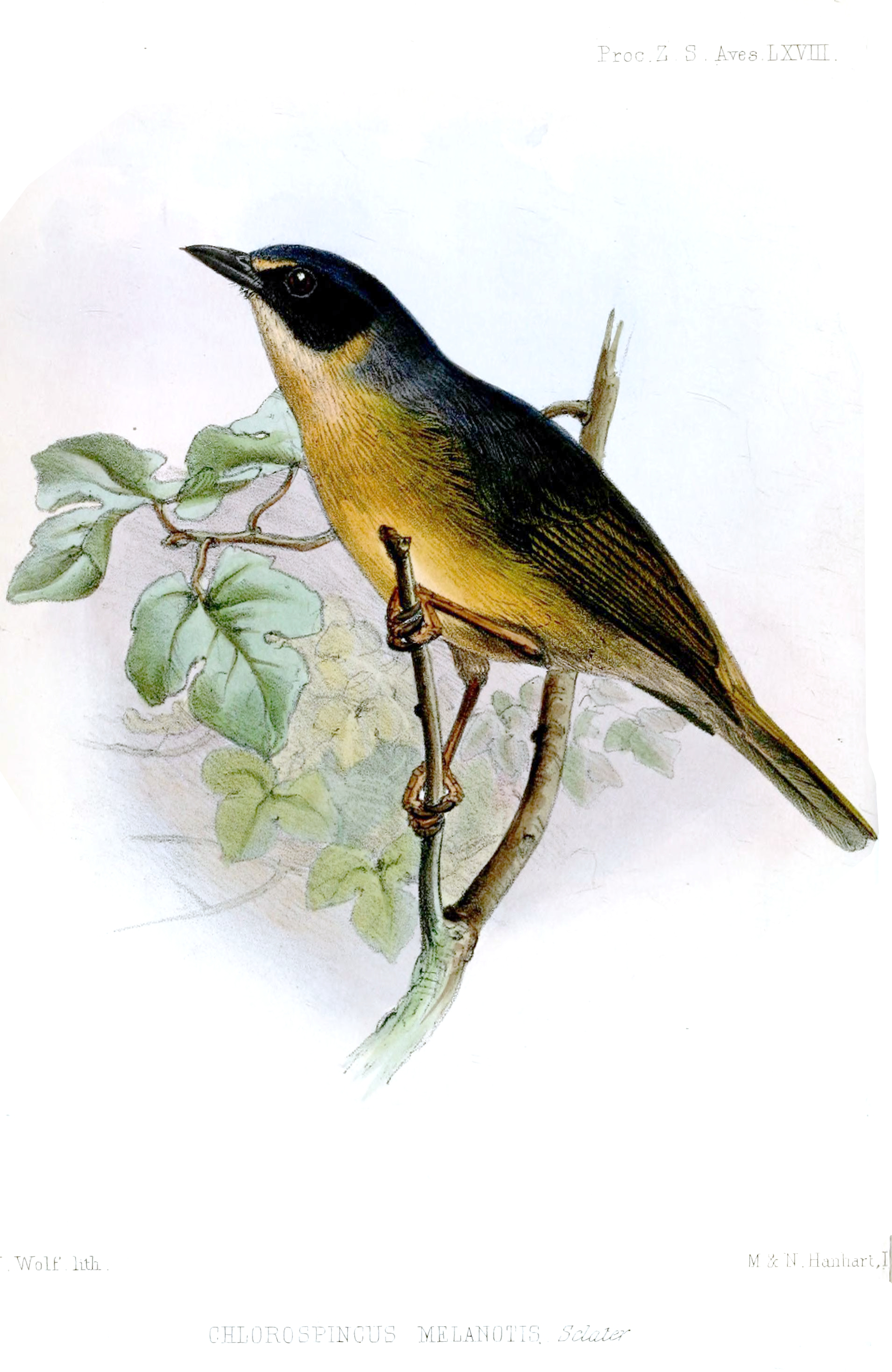

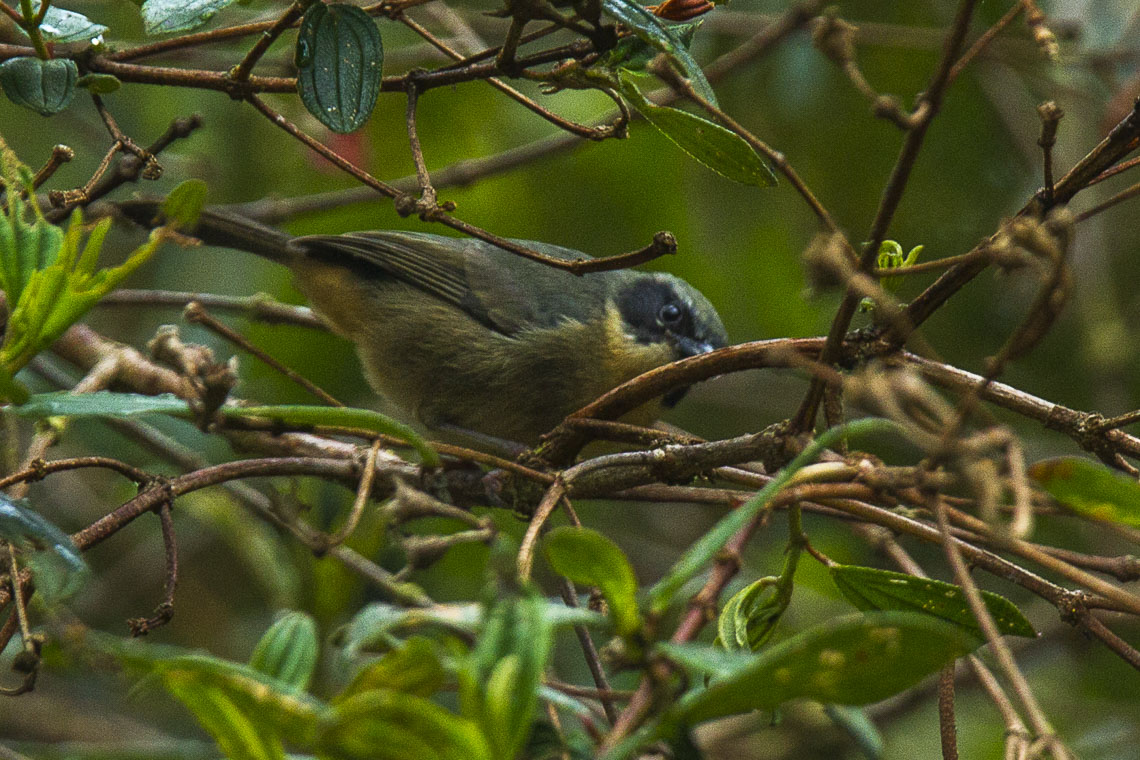

Conservation status
- Least Concern (IUCN 3.1)

Scientific classification
- Kingdom: Animalia
- Phylum: Chordata
- Class: Aves
- Order: Passeriformes
- Family: Thraupidae
- Genus: Sphenopsis
- Species: S. melanotis

Binomial name
- Sphenopsis melanotis (Sclater, PL, 1855)

= Black-eared hemispingus =

Species of bird

The black-eared hemispingus (Sphenopsis melanotis) is a species of bird in the family Thraupidae, the tanagers and allies. It is found in Bolivia, Colombia, Ecuador, Peru, and Venezuela.

== Taxonomy and systematics ==
The black-eared hemispingus has a complicated taxonomic history that as of October 2026 had not been fully resolved. It was formally described in 1855 with the binomial Chlorospingus melanotis. By 1938 it had been reassigned to the genus Hemispingus and included five subspecies. By 1970 it had acquired a sixth subspecies. Based largely on a 2016 publication, taxonomic systems transferred H. melanotis to its present genus Sphenopsis.

As of mid-October 2026, the most recent versions of the IOC, AviList, and Handbook of the Birds of the World taxonomies retained these three of the six subspecies:

- S. m. melanotis (Sclater, PL, 1855)
- S. m. berlepschi (Taczanowski, 1880)
- S. m. castaneicollis (Sclater, PL, 1858)

However, the Clements taxonomy and the South American Classification Committee retain all six. Clements groups the above three as the "black-eared hemispingus (black-eared)". The other three are:

- S. m. ochracea Berlepsch & Taczanowski, 1884)
- S. p. piurae (Chapman, 1923)
- S. p. macrophrys (Koepcke, 1961)

The other systems treat S. m. ochracea as the western hemispingus and the other two as the Piura hemispingus. Clements calls them respectively the "black-eared hemispingus (western)" and "black-eared hemispingus (Piura)". Though AviList has adopted the three-subspecies model for the black-eared hemispingus, the authors state, "Given the complex patterns of plumage variation in this group, further research on species limits is warranted."

This article follows the IOC/AviList/HBW three-subspecies model.

== Description ==
The black-eared hemispingus is 13 to 14 cm (5.1 to 5.5 in) long and weighs 13 to 22 g (0.46 to 0.78 oz). The sexes have the same plumage. Adults of the nominate subspecies S. m. melanotis have a gray crown and a mostly black face with a thin grayish white line between them and a small white arc below the eye. Neither of the white areas are easily seen. Their nape is gray and their upperparts, tail, and upperwing coverts are olive-gray with a brownish tinge. Their primary coverts are black and their flight feathers are dusky with olive-gray edges and an overall tinge of that color. Their throat and breast are cinnamon to pale orangish cinnamon, their sides and flanks are tinged brownish, the center of their belly is whitish, and their undertail coverts are buffy cinnamon. Subspecies S. m. berlepschi has a black chin and a richer, more rufous throat and breast than the nominate. S. m. castaneicollis usually has a long, thin white supercilium; it has a black upper throat and more black in the face than the nominate. All subspecies have a dark brown iris, a small, slender, blackish bill, and brownish legs.

== Distribution and habitat ==
The black-eared hemispingus has a disjunct distribution. Each subspecies is separate from the others and S. m. melanotis has several gaps in its range. The subspecies are found thus:

- S. m. melanotis: western Venezuela in extreme southern Táchira continuing south on the western slope of Colombia's Eastern Andes to Huila Department; eastern slope of Colombia's Western Andes in Antioquia Department; eastern slope of Colombia's Central Andes from Antioquia south and continuing on that slope into northern Ecuador to Tungurahua Province; and extreme southern Ecuador on the Loja-Zamora-Chinchipe line south into northern Peru to the Marañón River in Cajamarca and Amazonas departments
- S. m. berlepschi: eastern slope of the Andes of Peru from south of the Marañón in Amazonas south to western Cuzco Department
- S. m. castaneicollis: eastern Andean slope from eastern Cuzco into Bolivia as far as western Santa Cruz Department

The black-eared hemispingus primarily inhabits the undergrowth of humid montane forest, where it greatly favors stands of Chusquea bamboo. It is also found in dense shrubby or vine-tangled forest edges. In elevation it ranges between 1,800 and 2,800 m (5,900 and 9,200 ft) in Venezuela, between 2,000 and 3,000 m (6,600 and 9,800 ft) in Colombia, mostly between 1,800 and 2,700 m (5,900 and 8,900 ft) in Ecuador, between 1,200 and 3,050 m (3,900 and 10,000 ft) in northwestern Peru, and between 1,100 and 2,200 m (3,600 and 7,200 ft) on the eastern Andean slope of Peru.

== Behavior ==
=== Movement ===
The black-eared hemispingus is a year-round resident.

=== Feeding ===
The black-eared hemispingus feeds mostly on arthropods but includes small amounts of vegetable matter such as seeds in its diet. It forages in pairs or small groups and regularly joins mixed-species feeding flocks. It typically forages from the forest's understory to about 6 m (20 ft) up in its mid-level but occasionally will reach the subcanopy. It gleans and picks prey from clusters of dead leaves and from live foliage, sometimes hanging acrobatically to do so.

=== Breeding ===
The black-eared hemispingus' breeding season has not been defined. However, it appears to include September in Colombia and November in Bolivia. Nothing else is known about the species' breeding biology.

=== Vocalization ===
The song of the black-eared hemispingus' subspecies S. m. berlepschi is "a rapid mechanical chatter of metallic notes" and its calls "a rising tsee and nasal enk". That song has been written as "tsink’a’lee, tsink’a’lee, tsink’a’lee... ti, ti..ti" and is often sung by all members of a group. The song of S. m. melanotis in Ecuador is "an explosive and jumbled series of high-pitched sputtering notes".

== Status ==
The IUCN has assessed the black-eared hemispingus as being of Least Concern. It has a very large range; its population size is not known and is believed to be decreasing. No immediate threats have been identified. It is known in Venezuela only from a "rather small" number of records. It is considered "locally common" in Colombia, "rare to uncommon and local" in Ecuador, and "locally fairly common" in Peru. It occurs "in numerous middle-elevation protected areas scattered throughout [its] range".
