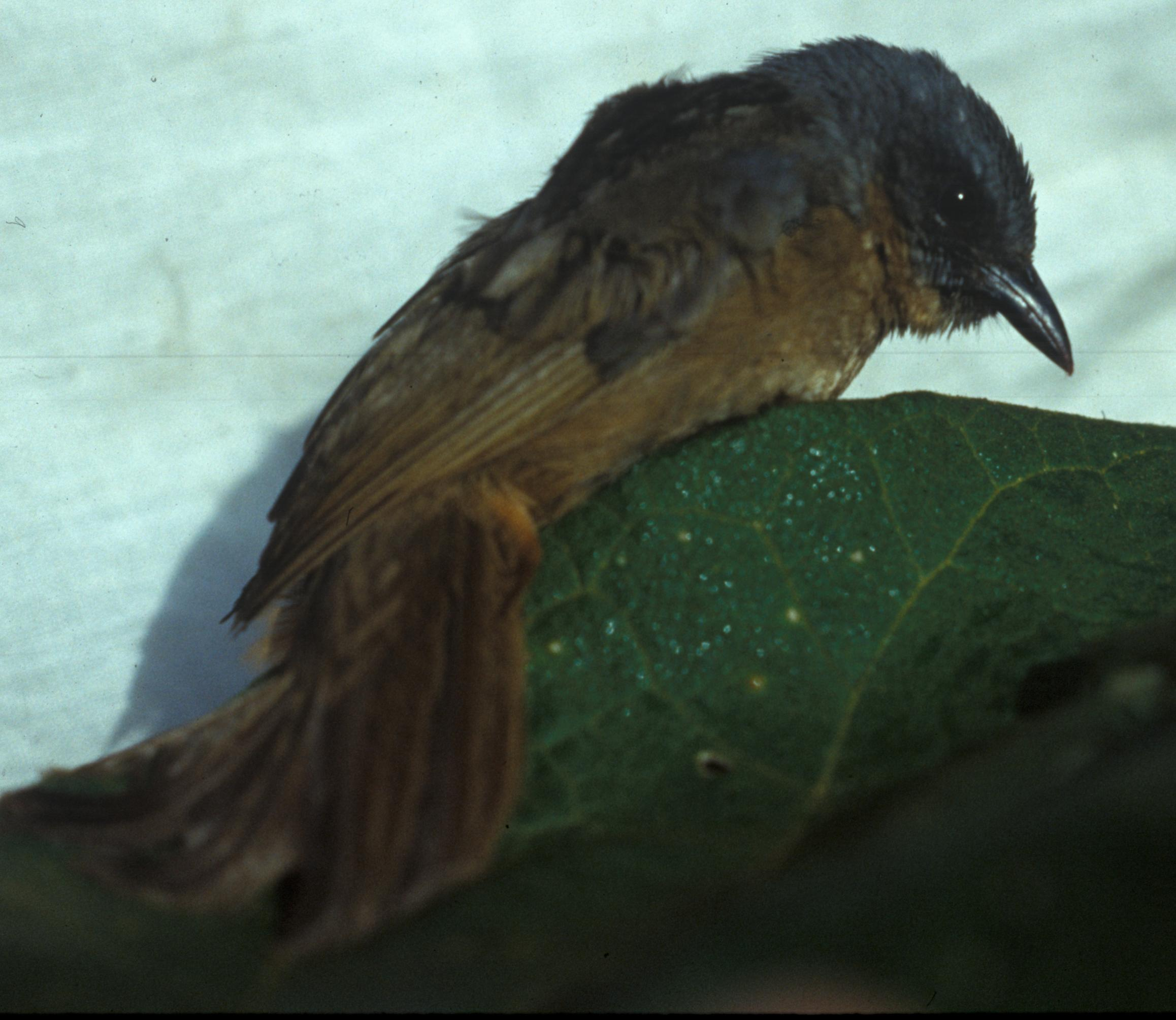
- Black-eared hemispingus (Sphenopsis melanotis)

Scientific classification
- Kingdom: Animalia
- Phylum: Chordata
- Class: Aves
- Order: Passeriformes
- Family: Thraupidae
- Genus: Sphenopsis; Sclater, 1862

Type species
- Sphenopsis ignobilis Sclater, PL, 1862

Species
- See text

= Sphenopsis =

Genus of birds

Sphenopsis is a genus of warbler-like birds in the tanager family Thraupidae. They are found in highland forest of South America.

== Taxonomy and species list ==
The four species now placed in this genus were formerly assigned to the genus Hemispingus. A molecular phylogenetic study published in 2014 found that Hemispingus was polyphyletic and as part of the subsequent rearrangement, the genus Sphenopsis was resurrected for these four species. The genus had been introduced in 1862 by the English zoologist Philip Sclater with the type species as Sphenopsis ignobilis, a taxon that is now treated as a subspecies of the oleaginous hemispingus. The name Sphenopsis combines the Ancient Greek sphēn meaning "wedge" with opsis meaning "appearance".

The four species in the genus are:

Image	Common name	Scientific name	Distribution
	Oleaginous hemispingus	Sphenopsis frontalis	Colombia, Ecuador, Peru, and Venezuela.
	Black-eared hemispingus	Sphenopsis melanotis	Venezuela, through to western Bolivia
	Piura hemispingus	Sphenopsis piurae	Ecuador and Peru.
	Western hemispingus	Sphenopsis ochracea	Ecuador and Colombia.
