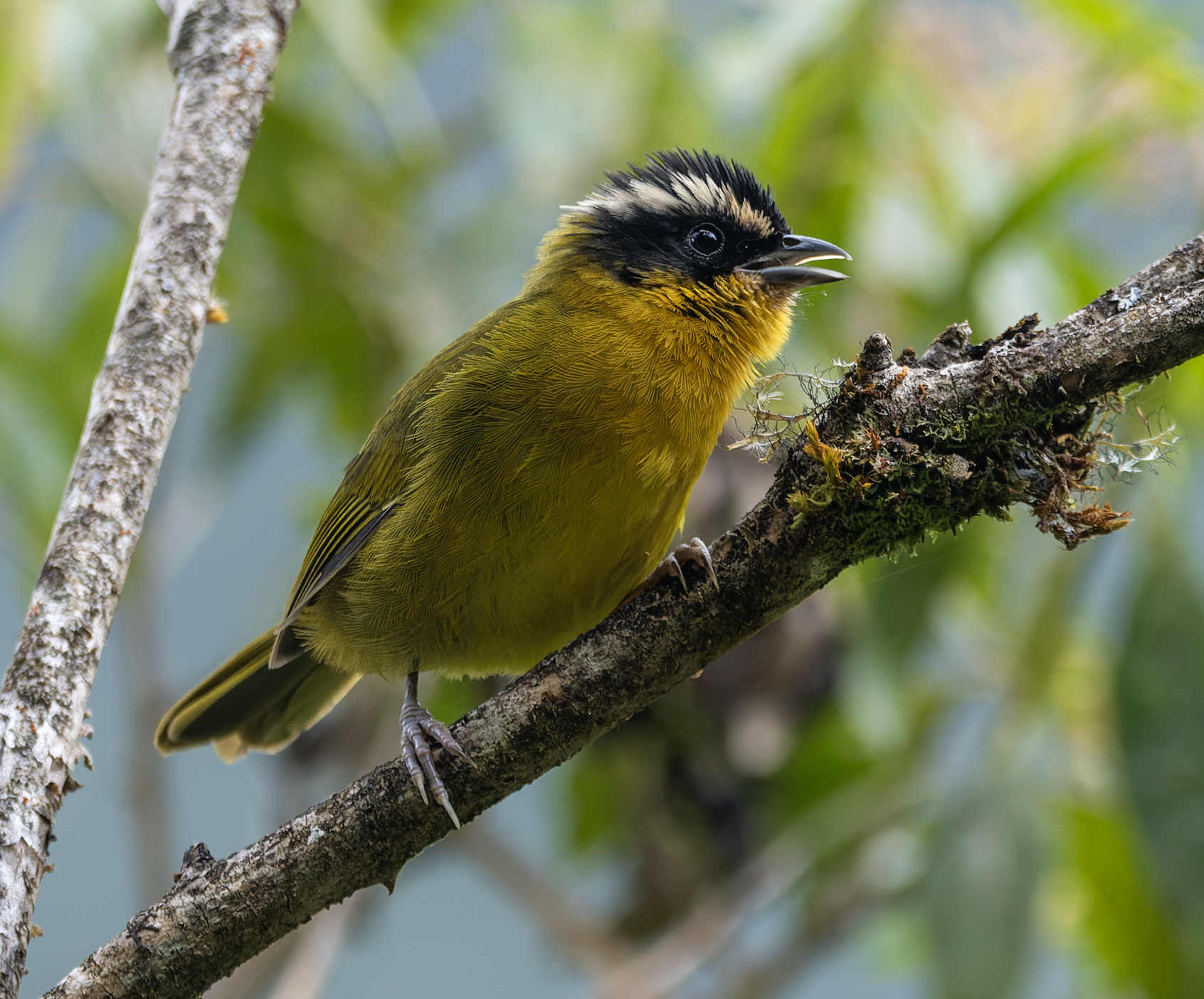

Conservation status
- Least Concern (IUCN 3.1)

Scientific classification
- Kingdom: Animalia
- Phylum: Chordata
- Class: Aves
- Order: Passeriformes
- Family: Thraupidae
- Genus: Kleinothraupis
- Species: K. atropileus

Binomial name
- Kleinothraupis atropileus (Lafresnaye, 1842)

Synonyms
- Arremon atropileus Lafresnaye, 1842; Kleinothraupis atropileus

Audio
- Song of black-capped hemispingus

= Black-capped hemispingus =

Species of bird

The black-capped hemispingus (Kleinothraupis atropileus) is a species of bird in the family Thraupidae. It is found in the Andes mountains of Colombia, Ecuador, Venezuela and Peru. Its natural habitat is subtropical or tropical moist montane forests.

== Taxonomy ==
The black-capped hemispingus was formally described as Arremon atro-pileus by the French ornithologist Frédéric de Lafresnaye in 1842. Lafresnaye erroneously gave the type locality of the species as Bolivia, but it was later corrected to Bogotá, Colombia. The specific epithet is derived from the Latin words meaning "black skullcap". The black-capped hemispingus has two recognised subspecies. These subspecies are sometimes considered separate species.

- Kleinothraupis atropileus atropileus (Lafresnaye, 1842): The nominate subspecies, it is found from Venezuela south through Colombia and Ecuador to far northwest Peru.
- Kleinothraupis atropileus auricularis (Cabanis, 1873): It is only found in Peru south of the Marañón River.

== Description ==
The black-capped hemispingus is, on average, 15–16 cm (5.9–6.3 in) long and weighs 18–26 g (0.6–0.9 oz). It has olive-brown upperparts, and largely olive to olive-yellow underparts. The throat is ochreous-yellow, grading to a yellow-olive towards the underparts. The sides and top of the head are pure black, with a buff-and-white supercilium that stretches to the back of the neck.

Although the black-capped hemispingus is confusable with the closely-related orange-browed hemispingus, these two species do not co-occur anywhere in their ranges. Additionally, they differ in the color of their supercilia (white in the black-capped and orange in the orange-browed) and the extent of their ear-coverts, which are broader in the black-capped hemispingus.

== Distribution and habitat ==
The black-capped hemispingus is an Andean inhabitant that is found from southern Venezuela south through Colombia and Ecuador to Cuzco in Peru. It inhabits moist montane and dwarf forests with large amounts of Chusquea bamboo at elevations of 1,800–3,600 m (5,900–11,800 ft).

== Conservation ==
The IUCN, which splits the black-capped hemispingus into two species, classifies both the black-capped and white-browed hemispingus as being of least concern. However, both subspecies are thought to be decreasing in population.
