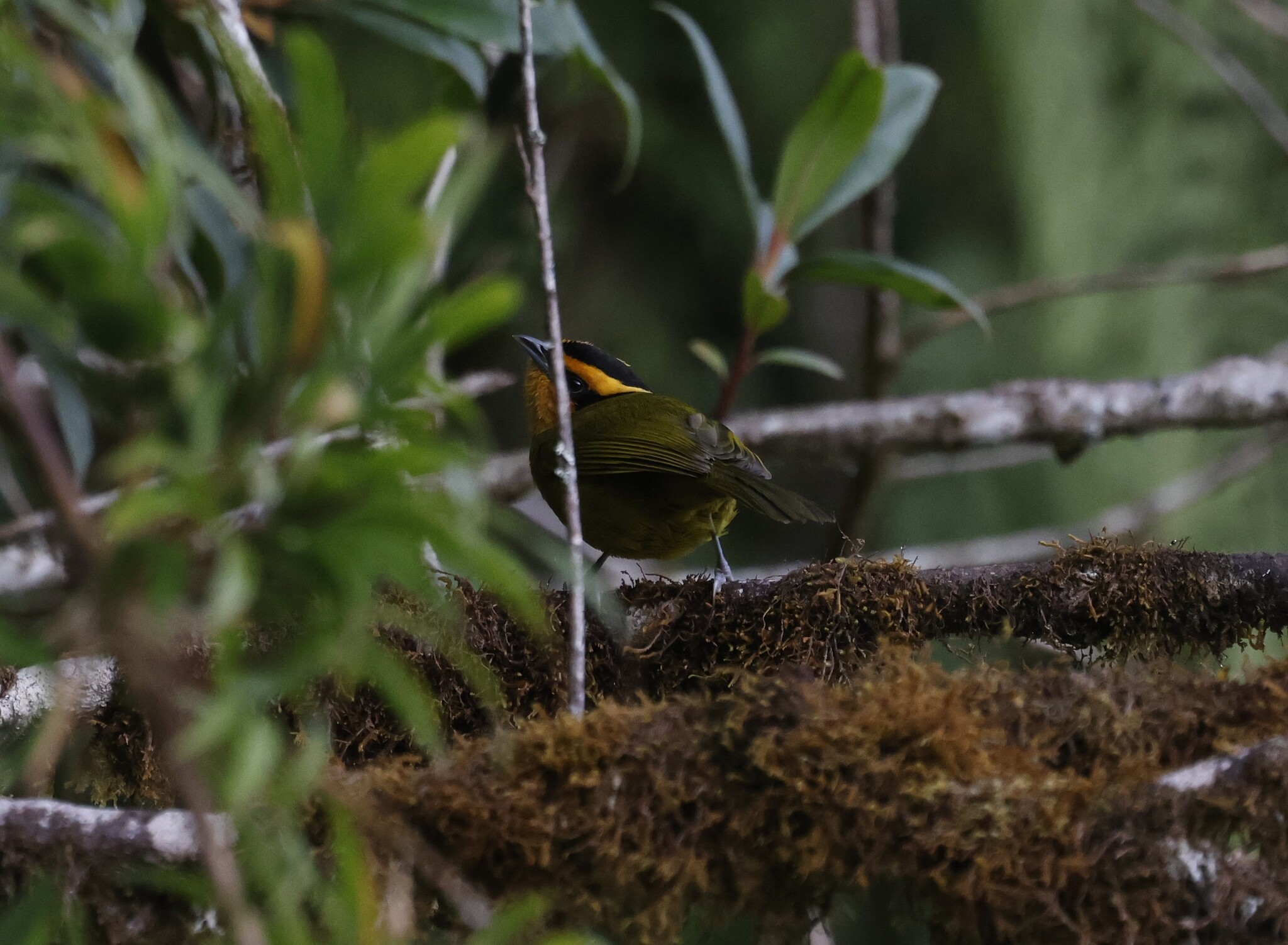

Conservation status
- Least Concern (IUCN 3.1)

Scientific classification
- Kingdom: Animalia
- Phylum: Chordata
- Class: Aves
- Order: Passeriformes
- Family: Thraupidae
- Genus: Kleinothraupis
- Species: K. calophrys

Binomial name
- Kleinothraupis calophrys (Sclater, PL & Salvin, 1876)

Synonyms
- See text

= Orange-browed hemispingus =

Species of bird

The orange-browed hemispingus (Kleinothraupis calophrys) is a species of bird in the family Thraupidae, the tanagers and allies. It is found in Bolivia and Peru.

== Taxonomy and systematics ==
The orange-browed hemispingus has a somewhat complicated taxonomic history. It was formally described by the English ornithologists Philip Sclater and Osbert Salvin in 1876 with the binomial Chlorospingus calophrys, based on specimens from "Tilotilo, prov. Yungas, Bolivia". By 1938 it had been reclassified as subspecies Hemispingus atro-pileus calophrys of the black-capped hemispingus, and it remained there to at least 1970. By 1988 it had been restored to full species status as Hemispingus calophrys. Based largely on a 2016 publication, taxonomic systems transferred H. calophrys to its present genus Kleinothraupis.

The specific epithet calophrys is derived from the Greek words meaning "beautiful eyebrow".

The orange-browed hemispingus is monotypic.

== Description ==
The orange-browed hemispingus is 14 to 16 cm (5.5 to 6.3 in) long and weighs 14.5 to 20.5 g (0.51 to 0.72 oz). The sexes have the same plumage. Adults have a narrow black crown and nape stripe, a long and wide orange-ochre supercilium, a black triangle from the bill through the ear coverts with a small orange-ochre spot near the back, and orange-ochre cheeks. Their upperparts, tail, and upperwing coverts are bright olive with a yellowish tinge. Their primary coverts are blackish with olive edges. Their flight feathers are dusky with yellow edges on the outer pairs and olive edges on the inner pairs. Their throat and breast are rich orange-ochre that fades to ochre-yellow on the belly. Their sides, flanks, and undertail coverts are pale olive with a faint yellowish tinge. They have a dark brown iris, a dark gray maxilla, a lighter gray mandible, and dark gray legs.

The orange-browed hemispingus differs from its former "parent" black-capped hemispingus principally with its much wider orange-ochre, rather than narrow and whitish, supercilium.

== Distribution and habitat ==
The orange-browed hemispingus is found on the east side of the Andes from a small area of southeastern Peru's Puno Department south into western and central Bolivia's La Paz and Cochabamba departments. It inhabits the interior and edges of wet montane forest and elfin forest where it is almost always found in or near stands of Chusquea bamboo. It also occurs in the dense vegetation that repopulates landslides. In elevation it ranges between 2,300 and 3,350 m (7,500 and 11,000 ft) overall and occurs at about 3,000 m (9,800 ft) in Peru.

== Behavior ==
=== Movement ===
The orange-browed hemispingus is a year-round resident.

=== Feeding ===
The orange-browed hemispingus feeds primarily on arthropods but also includes small amounts of vegetable matter in its diet. It forages in pairs or groups of up to about eight of its species and regularly though not exclusively joins mixed-species feeding flocks. It forages mostly in bamboo, taking prey from the leaves and branches up to about 6 m (20 ft) above the ground.

=== Breeding ===
Nothing is known about the orange-browed hemispingus' breeding biology.

=== Vocalization ===
The orange-browed hemispingus' song has been recorded but not put into words. While foraging it makes "high chittery trills that descend somewhat" and other calls include "a variety of high, soft tic and ti notes".

== Status ==
The IUCN has assessed the orange-browed hemispingus as being of Least Concern. It has a restricted range; its population size is not known and is believed to be decreasing. No immediate threats have been identified. It is considered fairly common to locally common but "likely vulnerable to ongoing colonization and deforestation".
