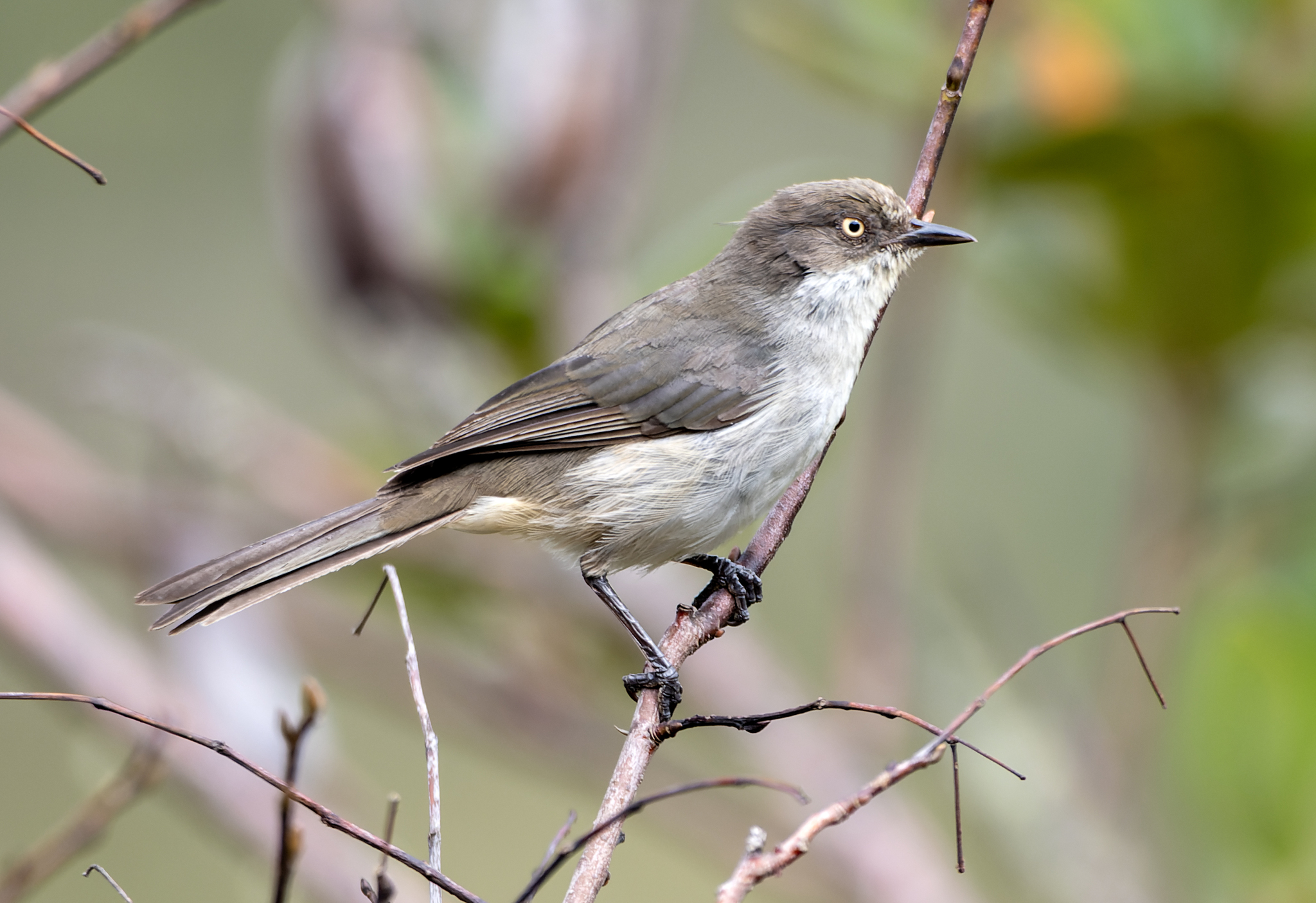

Conservation status
- Least Concern (IUCN 3.1)

Scientific classification
- Kingdom: Animalia
- Phylum: Chordata
- Class: Aves
- Order: Passeriformes
- Family: Thraupidae
- Genus: Pseudospingus
- Species: P. xanthophthalmus

Binomial name
- Pseudospingus xanthophthalmus (Taczanowski, 1874)

= Drab hemispingus =

Species of bird

The drab hemispingus (Pseudospingus xanthophthalmus) is a species of bird in the family Thraupidae, the tanagers and allies. It is found in Bolivia and Peru.

== Taxonomy and systematics ==
The drab hemispingus has a complicated taxonomic history. It was formally described in 1874 with the binomial Dacnis xanthophthalma. In 1896 Hans von Berlepsch erected the genus Pseudospingus for this species and the black-headed hemispingus (P. verticalis). In 1947 John T. Zimmer merged Pseudospingus into the genus Hemispingus. Based on studies published between 2014 and 2016, taxonomic systems re-split many species from the genus Hemispingus. They resurrected genus Pseudospingus, creating the drab hemispingus' current binomial.

The drab hemispingus shares the genus Pseudospingus with the black-headed hemispingus. It is monotypic.

== Description ==
The drab hemispingus is 13 to 14 cm (5.1 to 5.5 in) long and weighs 10 to 15 g (0.35 to 0.53 oz). Adults have a brownish gray head, nape, upperparts, wings, and tail. Their throat and belly are whitish, their breast grayish white, their flanks tinged grayish, and their undertail coverts tinged buff. They have a white to pale yellow iris, a thin blackish bill, and blackish legs.

== Distribution and habitat ==
The drab hemispingus is found along the eastern slope of the Andes from the Marañón River in northern Peru south into western Bolivia's La Paz Department. It inhabits humid montane and elfin forest to the tree line. In elevation it ranges between 2,200 and 3,350 m (7,200 and 11,000 ft) in Peru and between 2,900 and 3,050 m (9,500 and 10,000 ft) in Bolivia.

== Behavior ==
=== Movement ===
The drab hemispingus is believed to be a sedentary year-round resident.

=== Feeding ===
The drab hemispingus feeds primarily on insects. It typically forages in pairs and small groups and regularly joins mixed-species feeding flocks. It feeds mostly in the canopy, walking and hopping across leaves and branches and gleaning prey from them. It also occasionally takes prey in mid-air with a short flutter-flight.

=== Breeding ===
Nothing is known about the drab hemispingus' breeding biology.

=== Vocalization ===
The drab hemispingus' song is "a rapid series of tchip notes that accelerate into a jumble of squeaky warbles". Its calls include "a high tsit".

== Status ==
The IUCN has assessed the drab hemispingus as being of Least Concern. It has a large range; its population size is not known and is believed to be decreasing. No immediate threats have been identified. It is considered fairly common in Peru. It occurs in a few protected areas including Manu National Park in Peru and "[m]uch suitable montane and tree-line habitat exists also in unprotected areas within this species’ range, although locally these areas are becoming increasingly degraded or fragmented owing to deforestation and wood-cutting."
