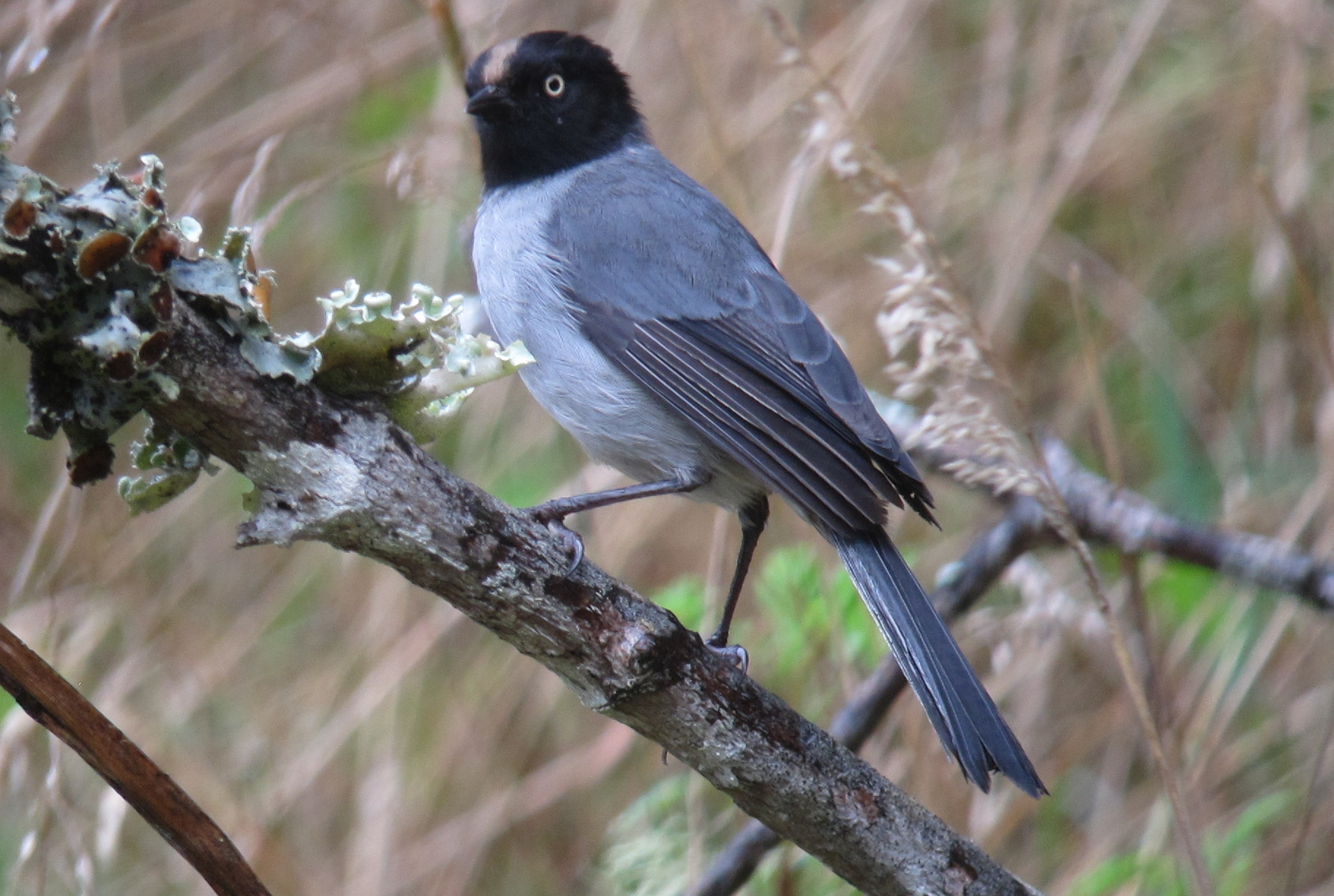
- at Guasca, Cundinamarca department; Colombia

Conservation status
- Least Concern (IUCN 3.1)

Scientific classification
- Kingdom: Animalia
- Phylum: Chordata
- Class: Aves
- Order: Passeriformes
- Family: Thraupidae
- Genus: Pseudospingus
- Species: P. verticalis

Binomial name
- Pseudospingus verticalis (Lafresnaye, 1840)

Synonyms
- See text

= Black-headed hemispingus =

Species of bird

The black-headed hemispingus (Pseudospingus verticalis) is a species of bird in the family Thraupidae, the tanagers and allies. It is found in Colombia, Ecuador, Peru, and Venezuela.

== Taxonomy and systematics ==
The black-headed hemispingus has a complicated taxonomic history. It was formally described in 1840 with the binomial Nemosia verticalis. In 1896 Hans von Berlepsch erected the genus Pseudospingus for this species and the drab hemispingus (P. xanthophthalmus). In 1947 John T. Zimmer merged Pseudospingus into the genus Hemispingus. Based on studies published between 2014 and 2016, taxonomic systems re-split many species from the genus Hemispingus. They resurrected genus Pseudospingus, creating the black-headed hemispingus' current binomial.

The black-headed hemispingus shares the genus Pseudospingus with the drab hemispingus. It is monotypic.

== Description ==
The black-headed hemispingus is about 14 cm (5.5 in) long and weighs 12 to 15.7 g (0.42 to 0.55 oz). Adults have a mostly black head with a wide clay-colored central stripe from the forehead to the middle of the crown. Their upperparts and tail are dark gray. Their upperwing coverts are dark gray with faint brown edges. Their flight feathers are dusky with brown edges on the outer ones and dark gray edges on the inner ones. Their underparts are mostly pale gray with a whitish belly and a buff tinge on the undertail coverts. They have a white iris, a thin blackish bill, and blackish legs. Immatures are much like adults but with a black and white throat and mostly whitish underparts with gray sides and flanks.

== Distribution and habitat ==
The black-headed hemispingus has a disjunct distribution. It is found from extreme southern Táchira in western Venezuela into Colombia along the Eastern Andes to Cundinamarca Department and in most of the lengths of the Central and Western Andes to Ecuador. Its range continues south along the eastern Andean slope through Ecuador and slightly into far northern Peru along the Piura-Cajamarca border to the Marañón River.

The black-headed hemispingus inhabits humid montane and elfin forest to the tree line and somewhat beyond it in shrubby areas. In Venezuela it is known at elevations between 2,800 and 3,000 m (9,200 and 9,800 ft) and is probably also higher. In Colombia it ranges between 3,000 and 3,600 m (9,800 and 11,800 ft), in Ecuador mostly between 1,800 and 2,700 m (5,900 and 8,900 ft), and in Peru between 2,700 and 2,950 m (8,900 and 9,700 ft).

== Behavior ==
=== Movement ===
The black-headed hemispingus is believed to be a sedentary year-round resident.

=== Feeding ===
The black-headed hemispingus feeds primarily on insects but also includes small berries in its diet. It typically forages in pairs and small groups and regularly joins mixed-species feeding flocks. It feeds mostly in the canopy, even of shrubs, walking and hopping across leaves and branches and gleaning prey from them.

=== Breeding ===
The black-headed hemispingus' breeding season includes September in Colombia. Nothing else is known about the species' breeding biology.

=== Vocalization ===
The black-headed hemispingus' song is "a burst 5–15 seconds long of squeaky twittering notes mixed with [a] stream of higher-pitched thin seet or steet notes". Its calls while foraging are a "high tweet and tiip".

== Status ==
The IUCN has assessed the black-headed hemispingus as being of Least Concern. It has a limited range; its population size is not known and is believed to be decreasing. No immediate threats have been identified. It is known in Venezuela from only a few records. It is considered "local and uncommon" in Colombia and "fairly common" in Peru. It is more common in southern Ecuador than in the north.
