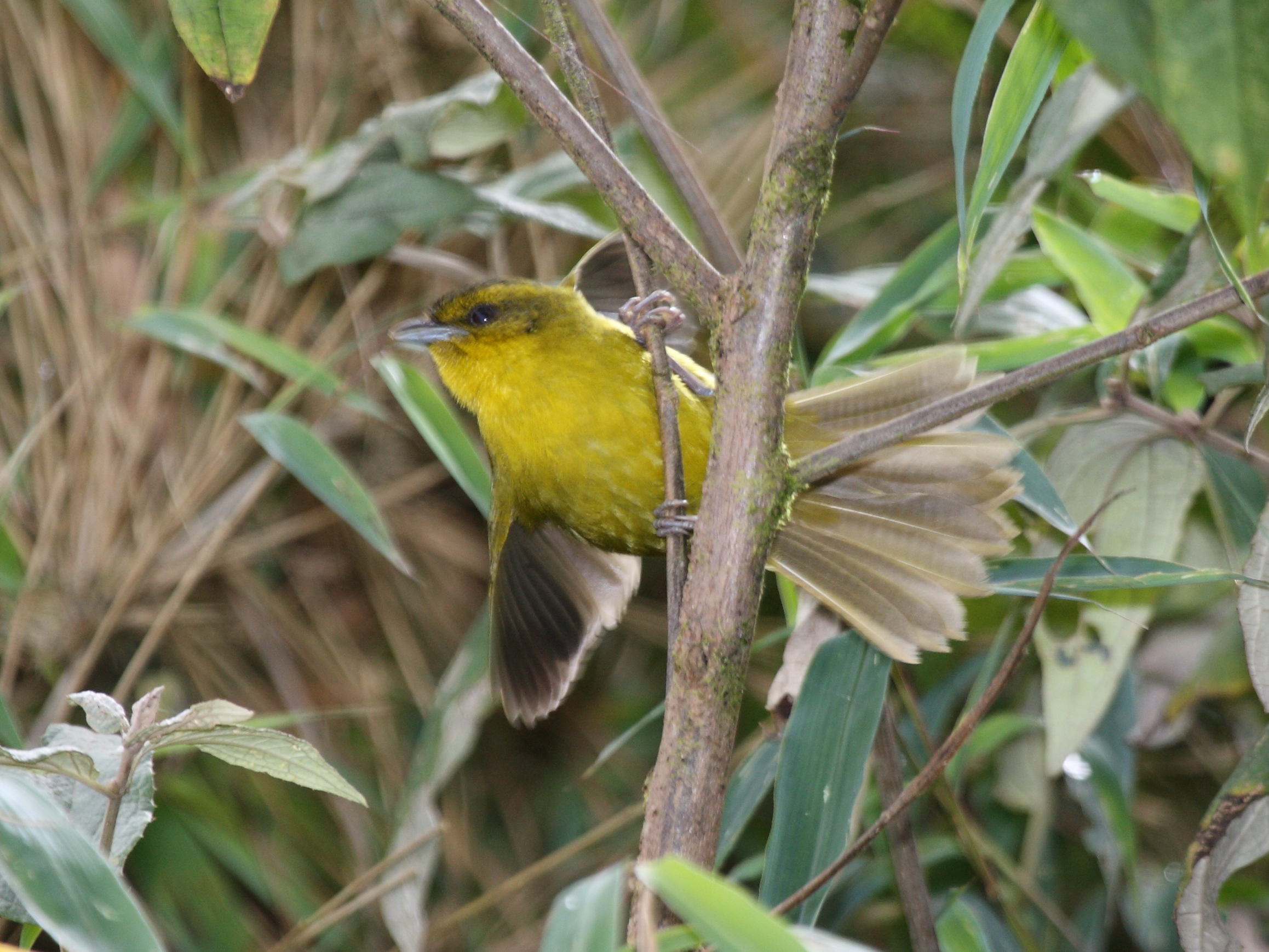

Conservation status
- Near Threatened (IUCN 3.1)

Scientific classification
- Kingdom: Animalia
- Phylum: Chordata
- Class: Aves
- Order: Passeriformes
- Family: Thraupidae
- Genus: Kleinothraupis
- Species: K. parodii

Binomial name
- Kleinothraupis parodii (Weske & Terborgh, 1974)

= Parodi's hemispingus =

Species of bird

Parodi's hemispingus (Kleinothraupis parodii) is a Near Threatened species of bird in the family Thraupidae, the tanagers and allies. It is endemic to Peru.

== Taxonomy and systematics ==
Parodi's hemispingus was formally described in 1974 with the binomial Hemispingus parodii. Its specific epithet parodii honors José Parodi Vargas, "who provided us with a base for our expeditions at his Hacienda Luisiana". Based largely on a 2016 publication, taxonomic systems transferred H. parodii to its present genus Kleinothraupis.

Parodi's hemispingus is monotypic.

== Description ==
Parodi's hemispingus is 14 to 16 cm (5.5 to 6.3 in) long; one specimen weighed 21.8 g (0.77 oz). The sexes have the same plumage. Adults have a dusky olive crown that lightens to the rear, a warm yellow supercilium from the bill to the nape, an olive line from the lores through the eye, and dull yellowish ear coverts with a dark olive green behind them. Their back, rump, and uppertail coverts are olive green. Their remiges are dusky with yellow edges on the primaries and olive green edges on the secondaries and tertials. Their upperwing coverts are also dusky with olive green edges. Their tail feathers have dark olive green outer webs and dusky inner webs. Their chin, throat, and upper breast are warm yellow, their lower breast and belly a slightly duller yellow, their sides and flanks olive-yellow, and their undertail coverts bright yellow. They have a dark brown iris, a black maxilla, a medium gray mandible, and pale gray legs.

== Distribution and habitat ==
Parodi's hemispingus is found on the eastern slope of the Andes of Peru, primarily in Cuzco Department and slightly into adjoining southeastern Junín, western Madre de Dios, and northwestern Puno departments. Its range encompasses the Cordillera Vilcabamba to the upper valley of the Urubamba River. It inhabits humid elfin forest where it greatly favors stands of Chusquea bamboo. In elevation it ranges between 2,600 and 3,500 m (8,500 and 11,500 ft).

== Behavior ==
=== Movement ===
Parodi's hemispingus is a year-round resident.

=== Feeding ===
The diet of Parodi's hemispingus has not been studied but is assumed to be mostly or entirely arthropods. It typically forages in pairs or groups of the same species that may number up to nine individuals, and it regularly joins mixed-species feeding flocks. It forages in bamboo and small trees fairly low to the ground, gleaning from leaves and bamboo stems.

=== Breeding ===
The breeding season of Parodi's hemispingus has not been defined but apparently begins in late July. Nothing else is known about the species' breeding biology.

=== Vocalization ===
The song of Parodi's hemispingus is "a series of notes, most buzzy: tzzew tzeee tititititi, repeated incessantly" and its calls "a high, lisping, descending tseew and [a] sharp ti".

== Status ==
The IUCN originally in 1988 assessed Parodi's hemispingus as being of Least Concern but since 2012 as Near Threatened. It has a limited range; its population size is not known and is believed to be decreasing. "The primary threat to this species is accelerating deforestation in the Amazon Basin as land is cleared for cattle ranching and soy production, facilitated by expansion of the road network." It is considered "locally fairly common, but patchily distributed". "Parodi's Hemispingus probably is little affected by human activity, other than from the local effects of habitat loss. The human population is low, however, within the cool, wet regions that the hemispingus occupies."
