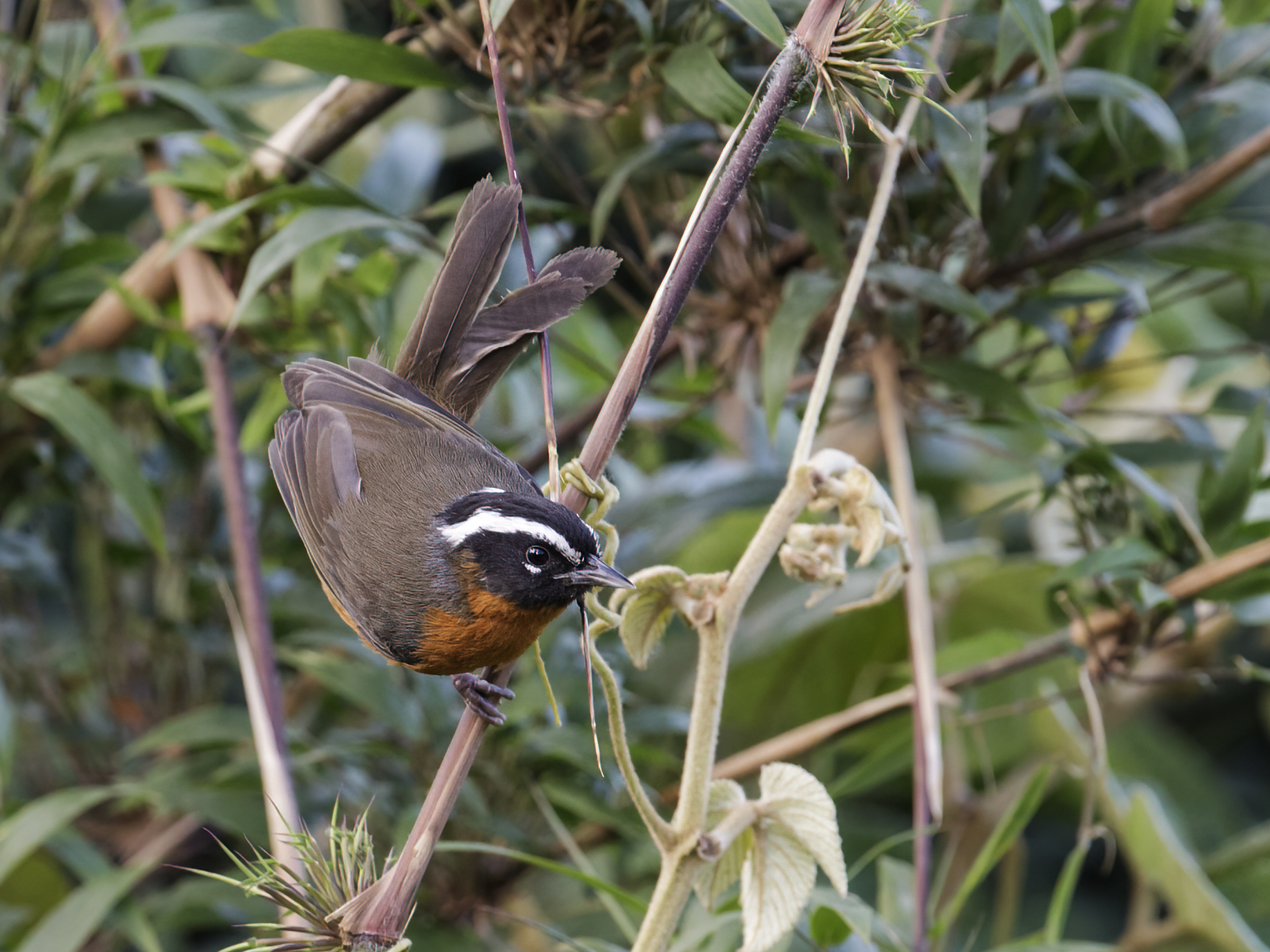

Conservation status
- Least Concern (IUCN 3.1)

Scientific classification
- Kingdom: Animalia
- Phylum: Chordata
- Class: Aves
- Order: Passeriformes
- Family: Thraupidae
- Genus: Sphenopsis
- Species: S. piurae

Binomial name
- Sphenopsis piurae (Chapman, 1923)

= Piura hemispingus =

Species of bird

The Piura hemispingus (Sphenopsis piurae) is a species of bird in the family Thraupidae, the tanagers and allies. It is found in Ecuador and Peru.

== Taxonomy and systematics ==
The Piura hemispingus has a complicated taxonomic history that as of October 2026 had not been fully resolved. It was formally described in 1923 with the binomial Hemispingus piruae. By 1938 it had been reassigned as subspecies H. melanotis piurae of the black-eared hemispingus. In 1961 what was to become a subspecies of the Piura hemispingus was described as another subspecies of the black-eared hemispingus, H. m. macrophrys. By 2014 at least one taxonomic system had again recognized piurae, with macrophrys, as a full species. Based largely on a 2016 publication, taxonomic systems transferred H. piruae and macrophrys (as a species) and H. melanotis (with or without piruae and macrophrys as subspecies) to their present genus Sphenopsis.

As of mid-October 2026, the most recent versions of the IOC, AviList, and Handbook of the Birds of the World taxonomies treat piurae and macrophrys as the full species Piura hemispingus. However, the Clements taxonomy and the South American Classification Committee retain them as subspecies of the black-eared hemispingus. Though AviList has adopted the Piura hemispingus as a species, the authors state, "Given the complex patterns of plumage variation in [the black-eared hemispingus complex], further research on species limits is warranted."

This article treats the Piura hemispingus as a species with two subspecies, the nominate S. p. piurae and S. p. macrophrys.

== Description ==
The Piura hemispingus is about 14.5 cm (5.7 in) long. The sexes have the same plumage. Adults of the nominate subspecies have a mostly jet black head with a long thin white supercilium that reaches the nape and a white arc below the eye. Their nape is jet black and their upperparts brownish gray. Their wings' primary coverts are dusky and their flight feathers dusky with brownish gray edges and an overall tinge of the same color. Their tail is olive-brown with a slightly darker upper surface. Their throat is jet black and their underparts are rich cinnamon-rufous. Subspecies S. p. macrophrys is slightly darker overall than the nominate. Both subspecies have a dark brown iris, a small, slender, black bill, and light brown legs.

== Distribution and habitat ==
The nominate subspecies of the Piura hemispingus is found in extreme southern Loja Province in southern Ecuador and south on both slopes of the Andes of northern Peru in Piura and Cajamarca departments. Subspecies S. p. macrophrys is found on the western Andean slope in the upper valley of the Chicama River in northwestern Peru's La Libertad Department. The species primarily inhabits the undergrowth of humid montane forest, where it greatly favors stands of Chusquea bamboo. In elevation it ranges between 2,000 and 2,500 m (6,600 and 8,200 ft) in Ecuador and between 1,200 and 3,050 m (3,900 and 10,000 ft) in Peru.

== Behavior ==
=== Movement ===
The Piura hemispingus is a year-round resident.

=== Feeding ===
The Piura hemispingus feeds mostly on arthropods and probably includes small amounts of vegetable matter such as seeds in its diet. It forages in pairs or small groups. It seldom joins mixed-species feeding flocks in Ecuador but regularly does so in Peru. It typically forages from the forest's understory to its mid-level and occasionally higher. It gleans and picks prey from clusters of dead leaves and from live foliage.

=== Breeding ===
Nothing is known about the Piura hemispingus' breeding biology.

=== Vocalization ===
The Piura hemispingus' song has been recorded but apparently not described in detail. It is reported to be similar to that of the black-eared hemispingus, which see here, but somewhat slower.

== Status ==
The IUCN has assessed the Piura hemispingus as being of Least Concern. It has a small range; its population size is not known and is believed to be decreasing. No immediate threats have been identified. It is considered "very local" in Ecuador and "fairly common" in Peru.
