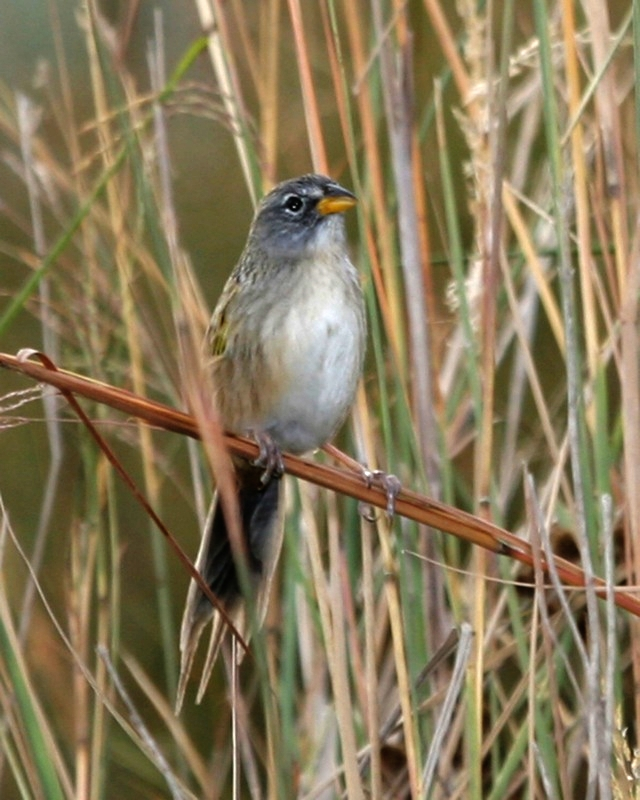

Conservation status
- Least Concern (IUCN 3.1)

Scientific classification
- Kingdom: Animalia
- Phylum: Chordata
- Class: Aves
- Order: Passeriformes
- Family: Thraupidae
- Genus: Emberizoides
- Species: E. ypiranganus

Binomial name
- Emberizoides ypiranganus Ihering, HFA & Ihering, R, 1907

= Lesser grass finch =

Species of bird

The lesser grass finch (Emberizoides ypiranganus), also known as the gray-cheeked grass-finch, is a species of bird in the family Thraupidae, the tanagers and allies. It is found in Argentina, Brazil, Paraguay, and Uruguay.

== Taxonomy and systematics ==
The lesser grass finch was formally described in 1907 with the trinomial Emberizoides macrourus ypiranganus. The specific epithet macrourus was soon dropped from the name. At the time the genus Emberizoides was included in a large family of Old and New World species, Emberizidae. A molecular phylogenetic study published in 2014 found that the lesser grass finch belonged in the tanager family Thraupidae. Some authors have treated the lesser grass finch and the wedge-tailed grass finch (E. herbicola) as conspecific but a 1982 publication confirmed them as separate species.

The lesser grass finch shares the genus Emberizoides with the wedge-tailed grass finch and the Duida grass finch (E. duida). It is monotypic.

== Description ==
The lesser grass finch is 18 to 20 cm (7.1 to 7.9 in) long and weighs 18.5 to 22 g (0.65 to 0.78 oz). It has a long pointed tail and a moderately thick bill. The sexes have the same plumage. Adults have a greenish to brownish crown with thin blackish streaks. They have a mostly grayish face with darker lores, a pale supercilium, and a thin whitish eye-ring. Their nape is gray. Their upperparts are boldly streaked with greenish brown and black; the black streaks are thinner on the rump and uppertail coverts. Their wings are mostly brownish with wide bright green edges. Their tail feathers have dark centers and grayish brown edges. Their throat is white and their underparts mostly pale grayish white. Their flanks are buff and they and the vent area have darker streaks. They have a dark brown iris, a yellow-orange bill with a blackish culmen, and brownish yellow to dull pinkish legs feet. Juveniles are similar to adults with the addition of a buffy yellow cast to the upperparts, a yellow cast to the face and underparts, and streaks on the breast.

== Distribution and habitat ==
The lesser grass finch has a "U" shaped range from eastern Paraguay south into northeastern Argentina to Entre Ríos Province, across northeastern Argentina and northern Uruguay, and north in southeastern Brazil through Rio Grande do Sul to far southern Minas Gerais. It primarily inhabits wet grasslands, swampy meadows, and marshes. It less frequently occurs in drier grasslands. In elevation it ranges from sea level to 900 m (3,000 ft).

== Behavior ==
=== Movement ===
The lesser grass finch is believed to be a sedentary year-round resident.

=== Feeding ===
The lesser grass finch's diet has not been studied. Single individuals and pairs forage on the ground, usually somewhat concealed in grass.

=== Breeding ===
The lesser grass finch breeds between October and March. Its nest is a deep cup made from leaves lined with finer plant material, placed in grass within about 0.7 m (2 ft) of the ground. The clutch is two to three eggs that are white with dark spots. The female alone incubates, for 13 to 14 days, and fledging occurs nine to 12 days after hatch. Both parents provision nestlings.

=== Vocalization ===
The lesser grass finch mostly sings from a hidden or open perch but only rarely in flight. Its song is "a harsh monotonous chatter, ch-ch-ch-ch-ch... or wet-wet-wet..." whose last few notes are often doubled. Its call is tse.

== Status ==
The IUCN originally in 1988 assessed the lesser grass finch as being of Least Concern, then in 1994 as Near Threatened, and since 2004 as again of Least Concern. It has a large range; its population size is not known but is believed to be stable. No immediate threats have been identified. It is considered overall "uncommon to fairly common" and "uncommon to rare" in Brazil.
