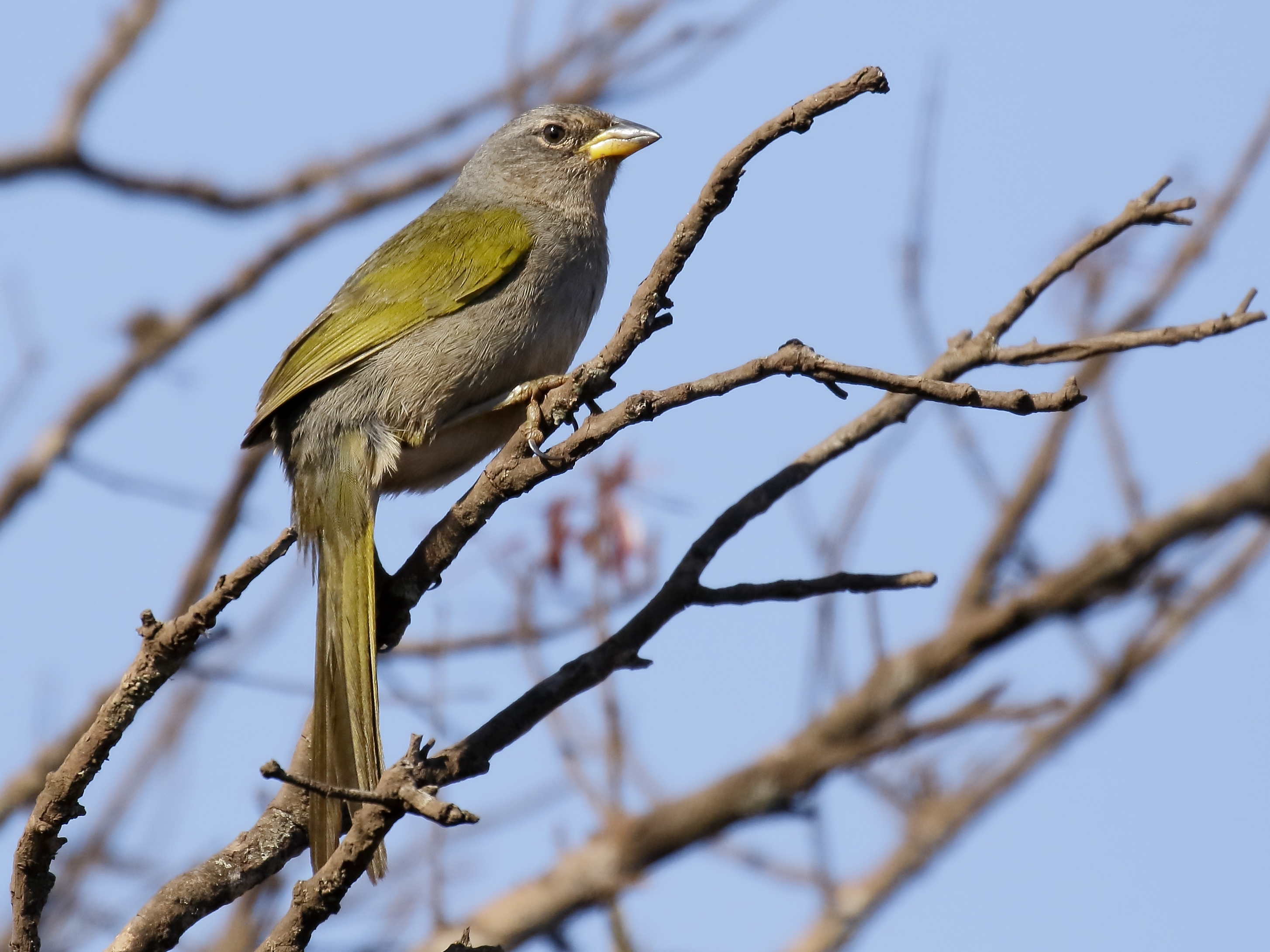

Conservation status
- Least Concern (IUCN 3.1)

Scientific classification
- Kingdom: Animalia
- Phylum: Chordata
- Class: Aves
- Order: Passeriformes
- Family: Thraupidae
- Genus: Embernagra
- Species: E. longicauda

Binomial name
- Embernagra longicauda Strickland, 1844

= Serra finch =

Species of bird

The serra finch or pale-throated Pampa-finch (Embernagra longicauda) is a species of bird in the family Thraupidae, the tanagers and allies. It is endemic to Brazil.

== Taxonomy and systematics ==
The serra finch was formally described in 1844 with its current binomial Embernagra longicauda. At the time, genus Embernagra was a member of the finch family Fringillidae. Some early twentieth century authors placed the genus Embernagra in the family Carduelidae. Others later reassigned it to what was then a large family of Old and New World species, Emberizidae. A molecular phylogenetic study published in 2014 found that the serra finch belonged in the tanager family Thraupidae. In addition to the species' current alternate name "pale-throated Pampa-finch", it has also been called the "buff-throated Pampa-finch" and "pale-throated sierra-finch". It shares the genus Embernagra with the Pampa finch (E. platensis), which some systems call the "great Pampa-finch".

The serra finch is monotypic.

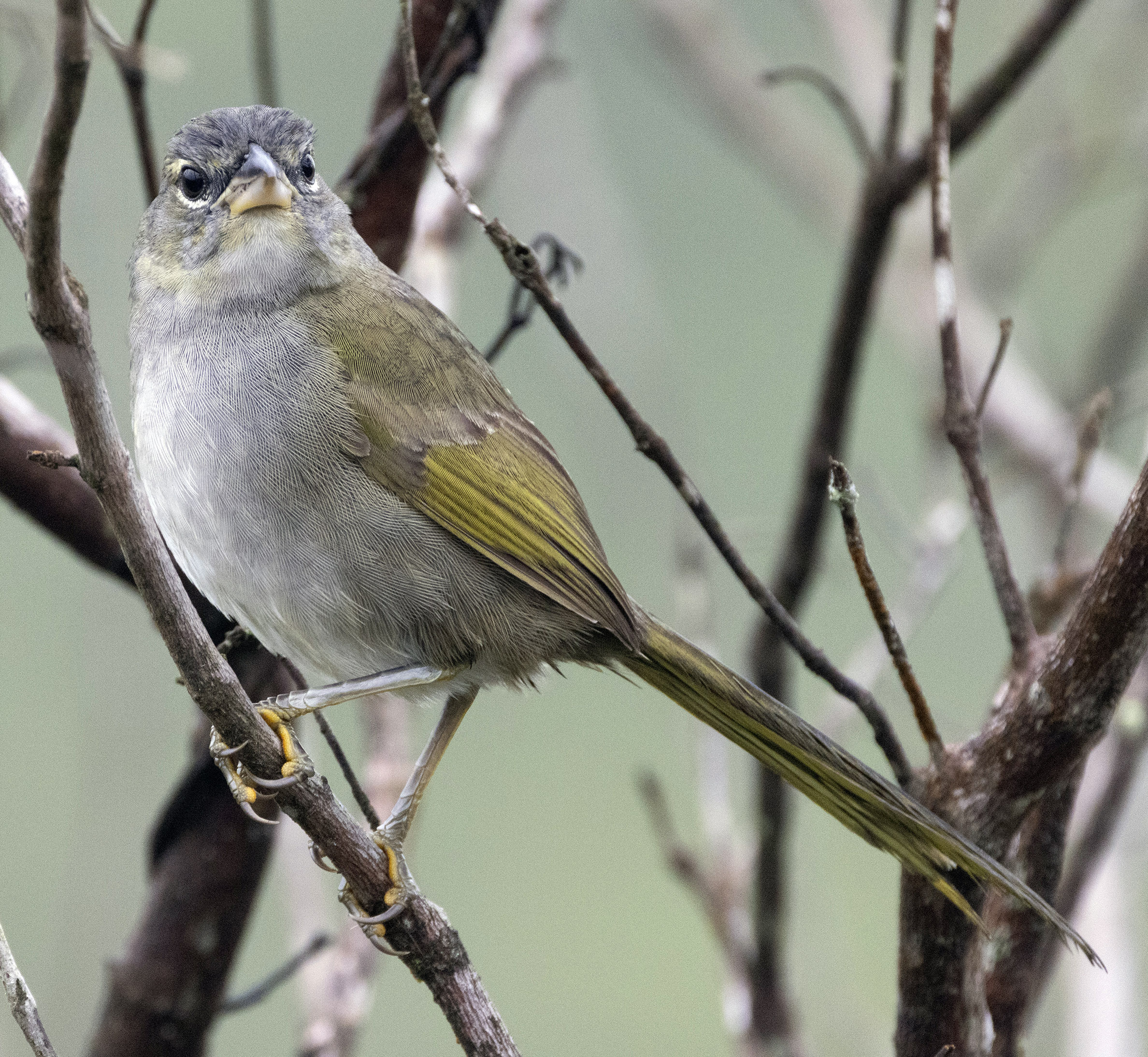
Serra finch

== Description ==
The serra finch is about 21.5 cm (8.5 in) long. It has short wings, a long tail, and a long and thick bill. The sexes have the same plumage. Adults have a dark line from the lores through the eye, a pale spot above the lores, and white crescents above and below the eye on an otherwise gray head. Their upperparts are greenish gray. Their wings are greenish gray with wide grass-green edges on the feathers, and so look brighter than the upperparts. Their tail's central feathers are greenish and the rest dusky with wide grass-green edges. Their throat is white, their breast grayer, their flanks slightly browner, their belly and vent off-white, and their undertail coverts have a warm buff wash. They have a dark iris, a yellow to orange-yellow bill with a black culmen, grayish to pinkish orange legs, and somewhat more olive feet.

== Distribution and habitat ==
The serra finch is found in eastern Brazil from central Bahia south to southern Minas Gerais. There are also scattered records further north, west, and south of the core range. There are also a few recent records in Espírito Santo. The serra finch primarily inhabits campos rupestres, a biome characterized by grasses, open woodlands, and rock outcroppings. Within it the species prefers woodlands and scrubby areas to open grassland. Sources differ on its elevational range. One states it is between 900 and 2,100 m (3,000 and 6,900 ft) while another places it much lower between 700 and 1,300 m (2,300 and 4,300 ft).

== Behavior ==
=== Movement ===
The serra finch is a sedentary year-round resident.

=== Feeding ===
The serra finch feeds mostly on arthropods and fleshy fruits but also includes some dry seeds in its diet. Pairs and family groups forage on the ground.

=== Breeding ===
The serra finch's breeding season is not fully defined but spans at least October to February. Its nest is an open cup made mostly of grasses without a lining. It is placed in a shrub, usually between about 0.3 and 0.6 m (1 and 2 ft) above the ground. The clutch is two eggs that are pinkish with dark blotches. Pairs maintain a territory year-round. The incubation period, time to fledging, and details of parental care are not known. The shiny cowbird (Molothrus bonariensis) is a brood parasite.

=== Vocalization ===
The serra finch's song is "a loud tsi, tsoweee, repeated at intervals of 4–5 seconds" and its call "a buzzy tziiup". Pairs sing in duet.

== Status ==
The IUCN originally in 1994 assessed the serra finch as Near Threatened and since 2013 as being of Least Concern. Its population size is not known and is believed to be decreasing. "Increasing conversion of land for cattle ranching is presumably the principal current threat, but deforestation may be permitting it to expand its range southward...Its occupation of montane habitats may render it susceptible to the effects of future climate change, but this requires investigation." It is considered "uncommon to rare" in its core range. It is known from at least eight protected areas.
