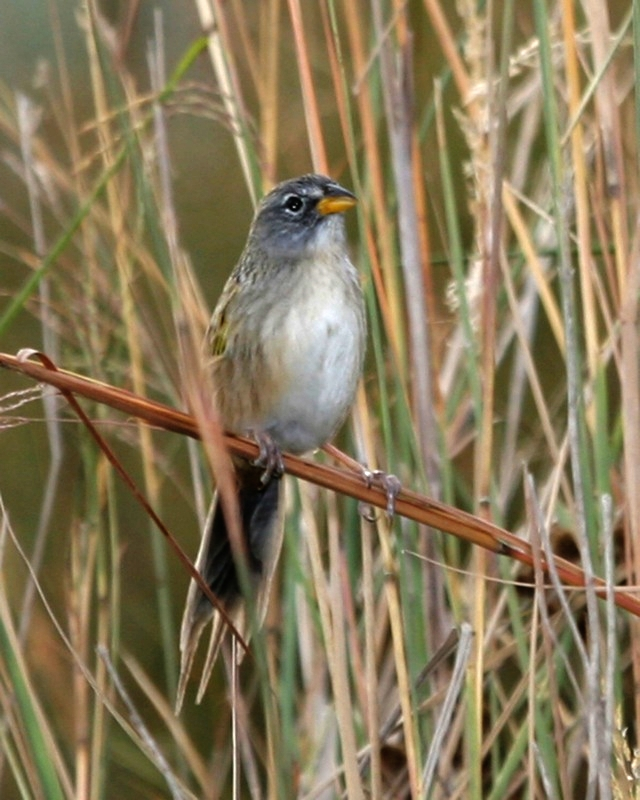
- Lesser grass finch (Emberizoides ypiranganus)

Scientific classification
- Kingdom: Animalia
- Phylum: Chordata
- Class: Aves
- Order: Passeriformes
- Family: Thraupidae
- Genus: Emberizoides; Temminck, 1822

Type species
- Emberizoides marginalis = Sylvia herbicola Temminck, 1822

Species
- Emberizoides herbicola; Emberizoides duidae; Emberizoides ypiranganus

= Emberizoides =

Genus of birds

Emberizoides is a small genus of finch-like tanagers found in grassy areas in Central and South America.

== Taxonomy and species list ==
The genus Emberizoides was introduced in 1822 by the Dutch zoologist Coenraad Jacob Temminck. The type species was later designated as the wedge-tailed grass finch by George Robert Gray. The genus name combines the bunting genus Emberiza introduced by Carl Linnaeus in 1758 with the Ancient Greek -oidēs meaning "resembling". This genus was traditionally placed with the buntings and New World sparrows in the subfamily Emberizinae within an expanded family Emberizidae. A molecular phylogenetic study published in 2014 found that Emberizoides was embedded in the tanager family Thraupidae. Within this family, the genus is now placed with Embernagra and Coryphaspiza in the subfamily Emberizoidinae.

The genus contains the following three species:

Image	Common name	Scientific name	Distribution
	Wedge-tailed grass finch	Emberizoides herbicola	Argentina, Bolivia, Brazil, Colombia, Costa Rica, Ecuador, French Guiana, Guyana, Panama, Paraguay, Peru, Suriname, Uruguay, and Venezuela
	Duida grass finch	Emberizoides duidae	Venezuela
	Lesser grass finch	Emberizoides ypiranganus	Argentina, Brazil, Paraguay, and Uruguay
