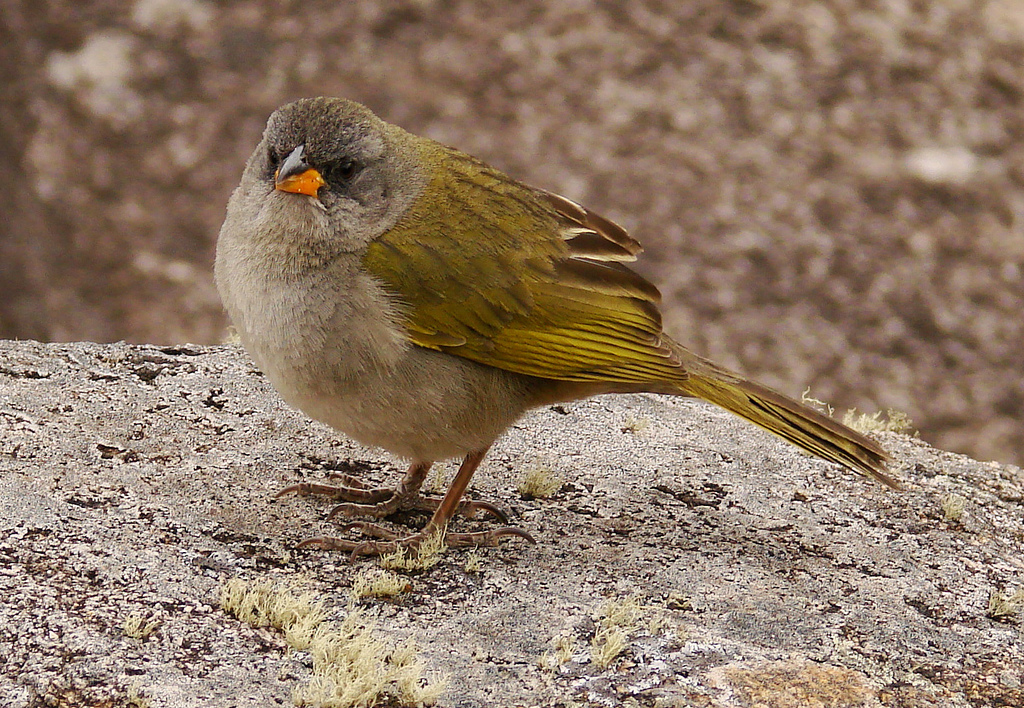

Conservation status
- Least Concern (IUCN 3.1)

Scientific classification
- Kingdom: Animalia
- Phylum: Chordata
- Class: Aves
- Order: Passeriformes
- Family: Thraupidae
- Genus: Embernagra
- Species: E. platensis

Binomial name
- Embernagra platensis (Gmelin, JF, 1789)

Synonyms
- See text

= Pampa finch =

Species of bird

The Pampa finch (Embernagra platensis), also known as the great Pampa-finch, is a species of bird in the family Thraupidae, the tanagers and allies. It is found in Argentina, Bolivia, Brazil, Paraguay, and Uruguay.

== Taxonomy and systematics ==
The Pampa finch was formally described in 1789 with the binomial Emberiza platensis. It was later declared the type species for the genus Embernagra that had been erected in 1831.

The Pampa finch's further taxonomy is complicated and not fully resolved. Some early twentieth century authors placed the genus Embernagra in the finch family Carduelidae. Others later reassigned it to what was then a large family of Old and New World species, Emberizidae. A molecular phylogenetic study published in 2014 found that the Pampa finch belonged in the tanager family Thraupidae. The Pampa finch shares genus Embernagra with the serra finch (E. longicauda), which some systems call the pale-throated Pampa-finch.

Most taxonomic systems assign these four subspecies to the Pampa finch:

- E. p. platensis (Gmelin, JF, 1789)
- E. p. olivascens d'Orbigny, 1839
- E. p. catamarcana Nores, 1986
- E. p. gossei Chubb, C, 1918

However, as of late 2025 the Clements taxonomy includes E. p. catamarcana within E. p. platensis and E. p. gossei within E. p. olivascens. It calls its two subspecies the "great Pampa-finch (western)" and "great Pampa-finch (eastern)" respectively.

This article follows the four-subspecies model.

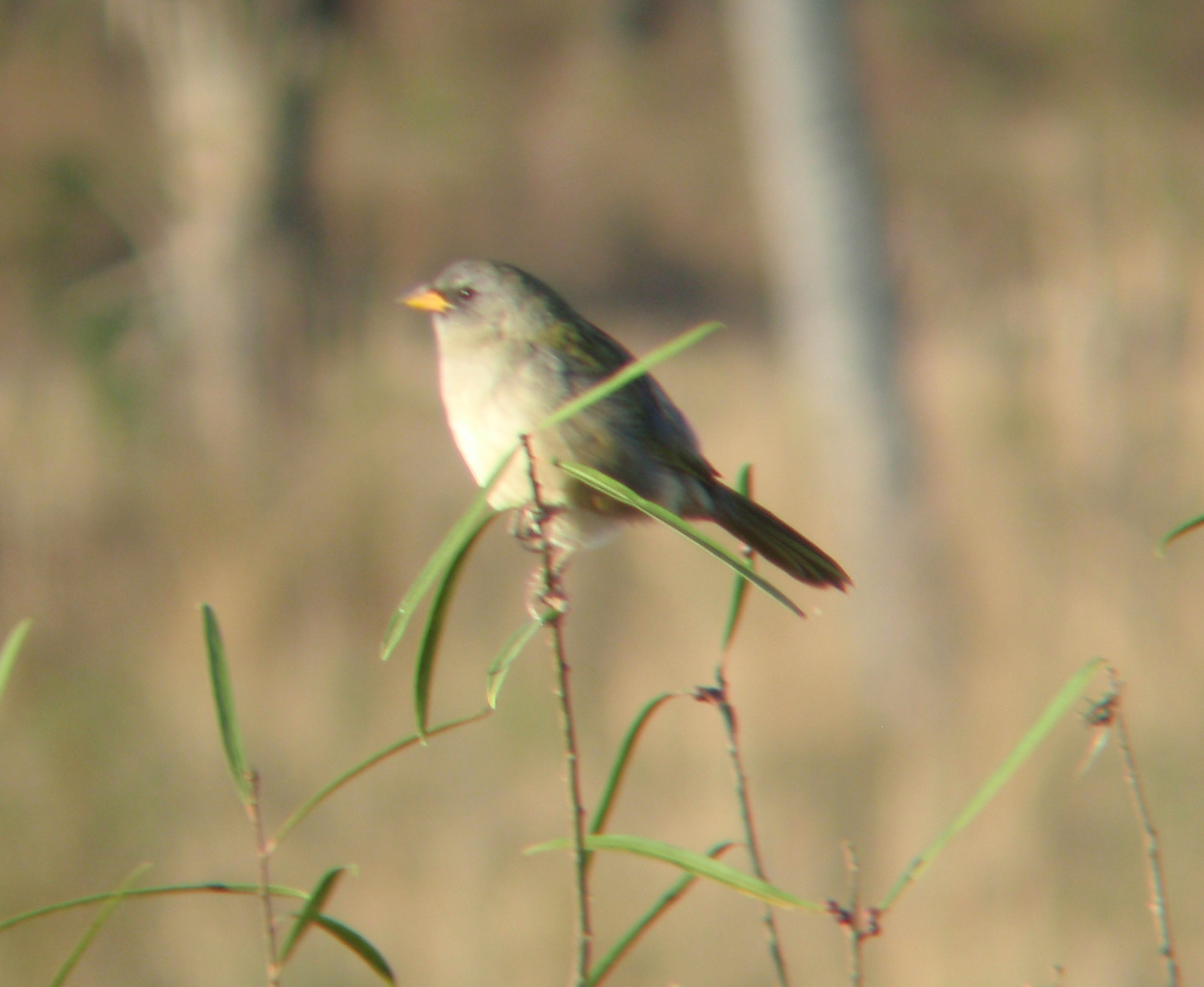
E. p. platensis in El Palmar National Park, Argentina

== Description ==
The Pampa finch is 20.5 to 23 cm (8.1 to 9.1 in) long and weighs 45 to 47 g (1.6 to 1.7 oz). It has short wings, a long tail, and a long and thick bill. The sexes have the same plumage. Adults of the nominate subspecies E. p. platensis have a dark mask from the lores to just past the eye on an otherwise gray head. Their nape is gray suffused with green that becomes grass-green on their upperparts. Their mantle and back have dark streaks of varying width. Their wings are mostly grass-green with wide blackish centers on the tertials. Their tail's central feathers are greenish and the rest dusky with wide grass-green edges. Their underparts are mostly gray that is paler on the throat with an off-white belly and vent that often have a cinnamon-brown wash. They have a dark brown iris, an orange bill with a black culmen, dull pinkish legs, and somewhat duskier feet.

Subspecies E. p. olivascens is larger than the nominate with a thicker bill with less black, no streaking on the upperparts, a buff-brown wash on the flanks and far underparts, and bright yellow to orange legs. E. p. gossei is larger than olivascens; it has more grayish green upperparts and a paler gray throat and breast than the nominate. E. p. catamarcana has a grayer head, more yellowish upperparts, a grayer breast without darker washes, and a whiter belly than the nominate.

== Distribution and habitat ==
The descriptions of the ranges of the Pampa finch's subspecies do not match this article's map, which comes from BirdLife International's Data Zone. They agree that the eastern part of the species' range includes the Pampas. The descriptions are:

- E. p. platensis: "northern Bolivia eastward to southeastern Brazil, and southward to eastern Paraguay and central Argentina"
- E. p. olivascens: "central Bolivia southward to western Paraguay and north-central Argentina (to Córdoba)"
- E. p. catamarcana: "central Catamarca (northwestern Argentina)"
- E. p. gossei: "west-central Argentina (Mendoza, San Juan, and San Luis)"

The Pampa finch is a bird of grasslands that have some shrubs. The nominate subspecies favors somewhat moister landscapes than the others, and they in turn prefer somewhat more shrubs among the grasses. In elevation it ranges from sea level to 2,500 m (8,200 ft).

== Behavior ==
=== Movement ===
The Pampa finch is a sedentary year-round resident.

=== Feeding ===
The Pampa finch feeds on seeds and arthropods, with the latter being more important in the breeding season. Pairs and family groups forage on the ground and sometimes attend army ant swarms.

=== Breeding ===
The Pampa finch's breeding season spans at least October to December and in the northwest continues further. Its nest is an open cup made from sticks, twigs, and dried vegetation lined with finer, softer, fibers. It is placed in a shrub or on thick grass, usually between about 0.3 and 1.5 m (1 and 5 ft) above the ground. The clutch is two to four eggs that are white with ochre and blackish markings. The incubation period, time to fledging, and details of parental care are not known. The shiny cowbird (Molothrus bonariensis) is a frequent brood parasite.

=== Vocalization ===
The Pampa finch's song is "a musical series of 3–5 notes of generally high frequency, last note often longer, louder and strongly frequency-modulated, gledit, gledit, gléeeeuuu or pzt–tcheew or chip–ptleeééé". Its alarm call is tzip, tzip, tzip and it also makes "a buzzy tziip call.

== Status ==
The IUCN has assessed the Pampa finch as being of Least Concern. It has a very large range; its population size is not known but is believed to be stable. No immediate threats have been identified. It is considered common throughout its range and "[a]ppears to adapt well to agriculture so long as some tall grass present on outside of farm fields, and often perches on and sings from fence posts".
