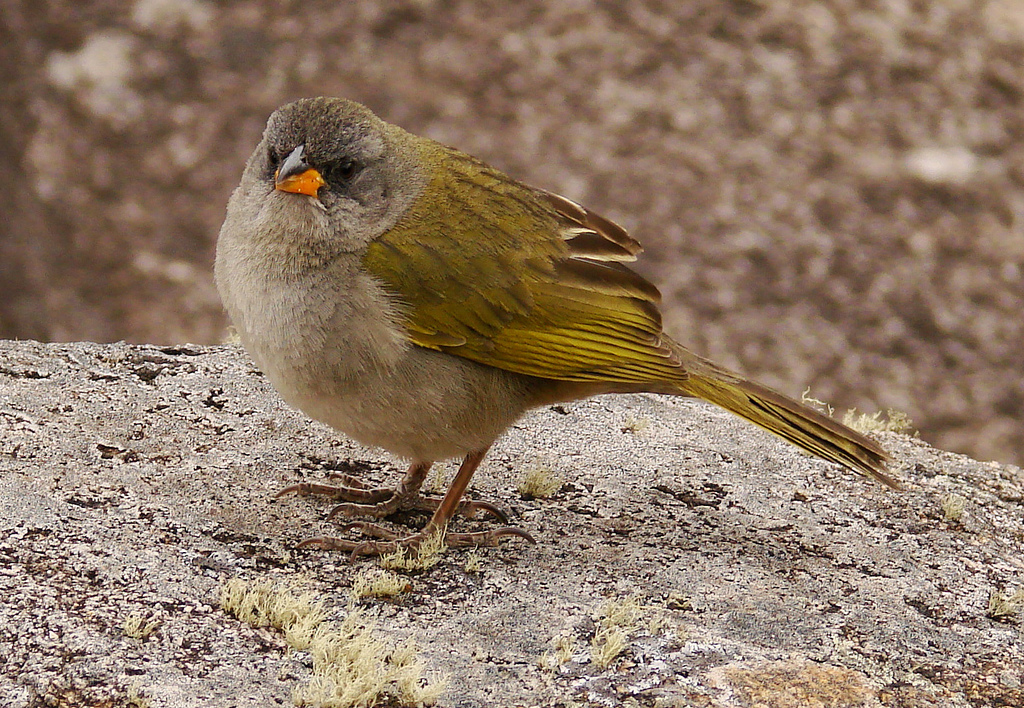
- Pampa finch, Embernagra platensis

Scientific classification
- Kingdom: Animalia
- Phylum: Chordata
- Class: Aves
- Order: Passeriformes
- Family: Thraupidae
- Genus: Embernagra; Lesson, 1831

Type species
- Tanagra dumetorum = Emberiza platensis Lesson, 1831

Species
- Embernagra platensis; Embernagra longicauda

= Embernagra =

Genus of birds

Embernagra is a genus of South American finch-like birds in the tanager family Thraupidae.

== Taxonomy and species list ==
The genus Embernagra was introduced in 1831 by the French naturalist René Lesson with the Pampa finch as the type species. The name combines the names of two genera: Emberiza introduced for the buntings by Carl Linnaeus in 1758 and Tanagra introduced for the tanagers by Linnaeus in 1764.

This genus was traditionally placed with the buntings and New World sparrows in the subfamily Emberizinae within the family Emberizidae. A molecular phylogenetic study published in 2014 found that Embernagra was embedded in the tanager family Thraupidae. Within Thraupidae Embernagra is now placed with Coryphaspiza and Emberizoides in the subfamily Emberizoidinae.

The genus contains the following two species:

Genus Embernagra – Lesson, 1831 – two species
Common name	Scientific name and subspecies	Range	Size and ecology	IUCN status and estimated population
Serra finch	Embernagra longicauda Strickland, 1844	Brazil	Size: Habitat: Diet:	LC
Pampa finch	Embernagra platensis (Gmelin, 1789)	Argentina, Bolivia, Brazil, Paraguay, and Uruguay	Size: Habitat: Diet:	LC
