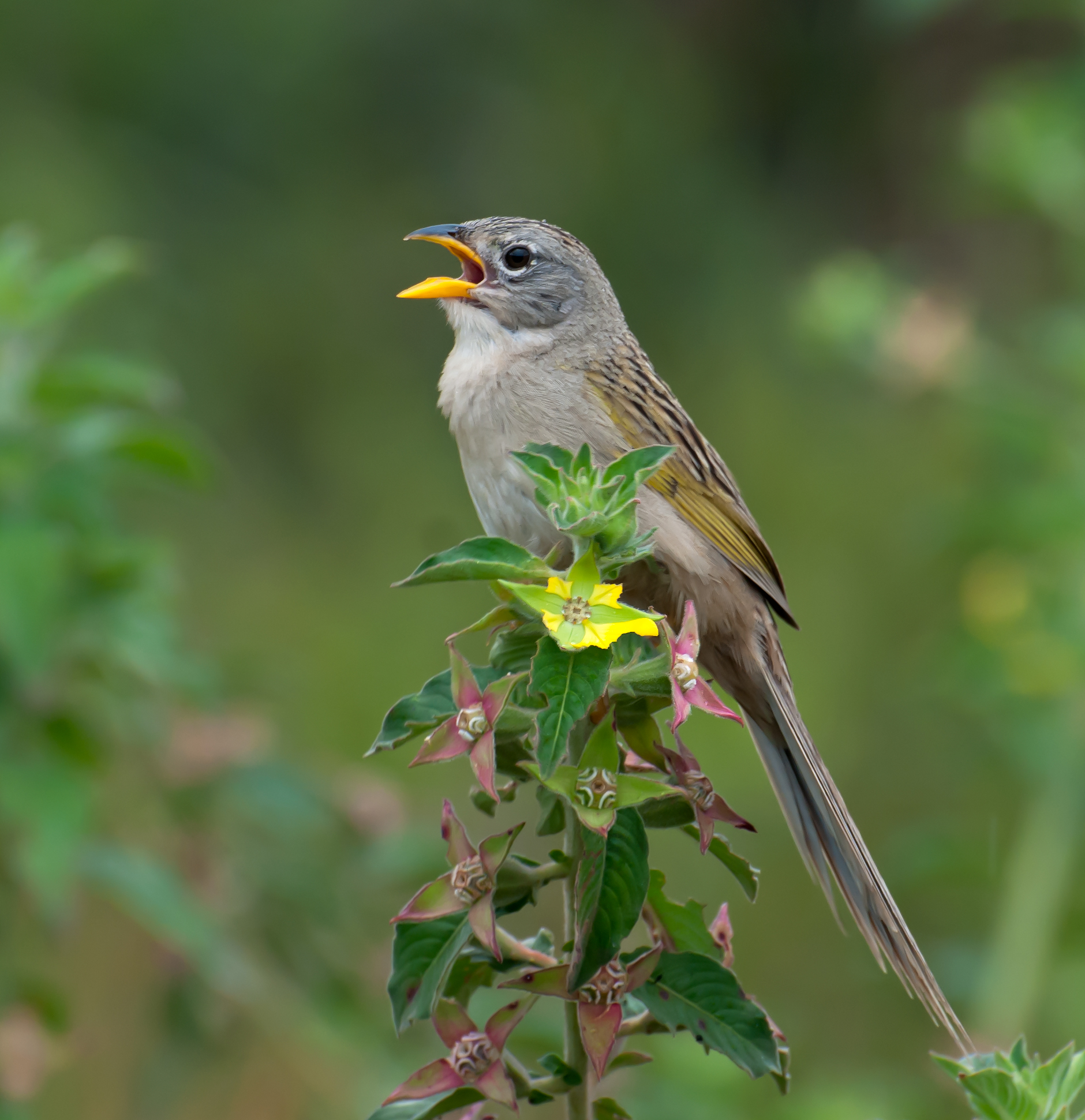
- At a nature reserve in Piraju, Brazil

Conservation status
- Least Concern (IUCN 3.1)

Scientific classification
- Kingdom: Animalia
- Phylum: Chordata
- Class: Aves
- Order: Passeriformes
- Family: Thraupidae
- Genus: Emberizoides
- Species: E. herbicola

Binomial name
- Emberizoides herbicola (Vieillot, 1817)

Synonyms
- Sylvia herbicola (protonym)

= Wedge-tailed grass finch =

Species of bird

The wedge-tailed grass finch (Emberizoides herbicola) is a species of bird in the family Thraupidae, the tanagers and allies. It is found in Colombia, Panama, and every mainland South American country except Chile.

== Taxonomy and systematics ==
The wedge-tailed grass finch was formally described in 1817 with the binomial Sylvia herbicola. It was eventually reassigned to its present genus Emberizoides, which was included in a large family of Old and New World species, Emberizidae. A molecular phylogenetic study published in 2014 found that the wedge-tailed grass finch belonged in the tanager family Thraupidae. Some authors have treated the wedge-tailed grass finch and the lesser grass finch (E. ypiranganus) as conspecific and others treated it as conspecific with the Duida grass finch (E. duidae). A 1982 publication confirmed them as three separate species. The three are the only members of the genus Emberizoides.

The wedge-tailed grass finch has these five subspecies:

- E. h. lucaris Bangs, 1908
- E. h. hypochondriacus Hellmayr, 1906
- E. h. apurensis Gilliard, 1940
- E. h. sphenurus (Vieillot, 1818)
- E. h. herbicola (Vieillot, 1817)

The Clements taxonomy recognizes some differences within the species, calling E. h. herbicola the "wedge-tailed grass-finch (southern)" and grouping the other four subspecies as the "wedge-tailed grass-finch (northern).

== Description ==
The wedge-tailed grass finch is about 20 cm (7.9 in) long and weighs 21 to 37 g (0.74 to 1.3 oz). It has a long pointed tail and a moderately thick bill. The sexes have the same plumage. Adults of the nominate subspecies E. h. herbicola have a pale brownish crown with thin blackish streaks. They have a mostly pale brownish face with paler lores, a pale supercilium, and a faint whitish eye-ring. Their nape is pale browish. Their upperparts are mostly boldly streaked with brown and blackish; their rump is unstreaked and the uppertail coverts' black streaks are thin. Their wings are mostly brownish with wide bright olive-green edges. Their tail feathers have dark centers and grayish brown edges. Their throat is grayish white and their underparts mostly creamy white. Their flanks and vent area are buff. They have a dark brown iris, a yellow to yellow-orange bill with a blackish culmen, and brownish yellow to dull pinkish legs feet. Juveniles are similar to adults with the addition of a rusty yellow cast to the upperparts, a yellow cast to the face and underparts, and streaks on the breast.

All of the other subspecies of the wedge-tailed grass finch are smaller than the nominate, have darker faces, and thinner black streaks on the upperparts. Subspecies E. h. lucaris has somewhat rusty upperparts. E. h. hypochondriacus has somewhat yellowish brown upperparts and blackish gray ear coverts. E. h. sphenurus also has yellowish brown upperparts with buffier underparts and a small amount of dark streaking on the sides of the breast. E. h. apurensis has darker grayish brown and blacker streaking on the upperparts and whiter underparts than sphenurus, with a grayish face and fine streaks on the flanks.

== Distribution and habitat ==
The wedge-tailed grass finch has a highly disjunct distribution. Only E. h. apurensis and E. h. sphenurus have contiguous ranges, and the latter has many gaps in its range. The subspecies are found thus:

- E. h. lucaris: the Térraba region in southwestern Costa Rica
- E. h. hypochondriacus: western and central Panama
- E. h. apurensis: lowlands of eastern Colombia from northern Meta Department into western Venezuela's Guárico, Portuguesa, Barinas, and Apure states
- E. h. sphenurus: locally in Colombian Andes, extreme southern Ecuador, patchily through central Peru, Venezuela except western lowlands and Cerro Duida, the Guianas, and northeastern Brazil from Amapá to northern Maranhão
- E. h. herbicola: roughly the southern half of Brazil, west into eastern Bolivia, and south through eastern Paraguay into northern Uruguay and northern Argentina as far as northern Entre Ríos and Santa Fe provinces

The wedge-tailed grass finch inhabits damp to dryish grasslands that usually have some scattered shrubs. The nominate also inhabits savanna. In all areas it greatly favors tall grass. In elevation it ranges up to 800 m (2,600 ft) in Costa Rica, to 1,800 m (5,900 ft) in Colombia, and to 1,600 m (5,200 ft) in Venezuela. It ranges between 800 and 1,450 m (2,600 and 4,800 ft) in Peru and from sea level to 1,500 m (4,900 ft) in Brazil.

== Behavior ==
=== Movement ===
The wedge-tailed grass finch is a sedentary year-round resident.

=== Feeding ===
The wedge-tailed grass finch's diet has not been studied but is believed to be mostly seeds and arthropods. Single individuals and pairs forage on the ground, usually in tall grass. They sometimes follow army ant swarms.

=== Breeding ===
The nominate subspecies of the wedge-tailed grass finch breeds between November and January; its breeding season elsewhere has not been defined. Males make a jerky flight display at dawn. The species' nest is a cup made from dry grass lined with softer plant material and is usually placed in dense grass. The clutch is believed to be two or three eggs that are white with brown spots. The incubation period, time to fledging, and details of parental care are not known.

=== Vocalization ===
The songs of the wedge-tailed grass finch's subspecies differ, and "[m]ore work needed on geographical variation in song and its possible taxonomic significance". The nominate's day song is "sweet and pleasant, a melodious double whistle, the first upwardly inflected, the second downwardly inflected, jewléé, jewlóóó". Its dawn song, sung during the flight display, is a longer and more complex chk chk teu jeulóó chk chk. Its calls are tsik or chik. The song of E. h. sphenurus is ch,ch,ch,r,r,ree-chwee,ye and that of E. h. apurensis tit-tit-zur-rreeeet. Subspecies E. h. hypochondriacus sings "a buzzy tsiritsitzeew or tzit-zeereea and a sweet tit-leeoo or tleedee".

== Status ==
The IUCN has assessed the wedge-tailed as being of Least Concern. It has a very large range; its population size is not known and is believed to be decreasing. No immediate threats have been identified. It is rare in Costa Rica, where "much of the original habitat has been destroyed to make way for pineapple plantations". It is fairly common" in Colombia, "locally uncommon to fairly common, but very patchily distributed" in Peru, "uncommon to fairly common" in Venezuela, "frequent to uncommon" in northeastern Brazil, "common to frequent" in southern Brazil, and "common" in Argentina, Bolivia, Paraguay, and Uruguay.

== Gallery ==
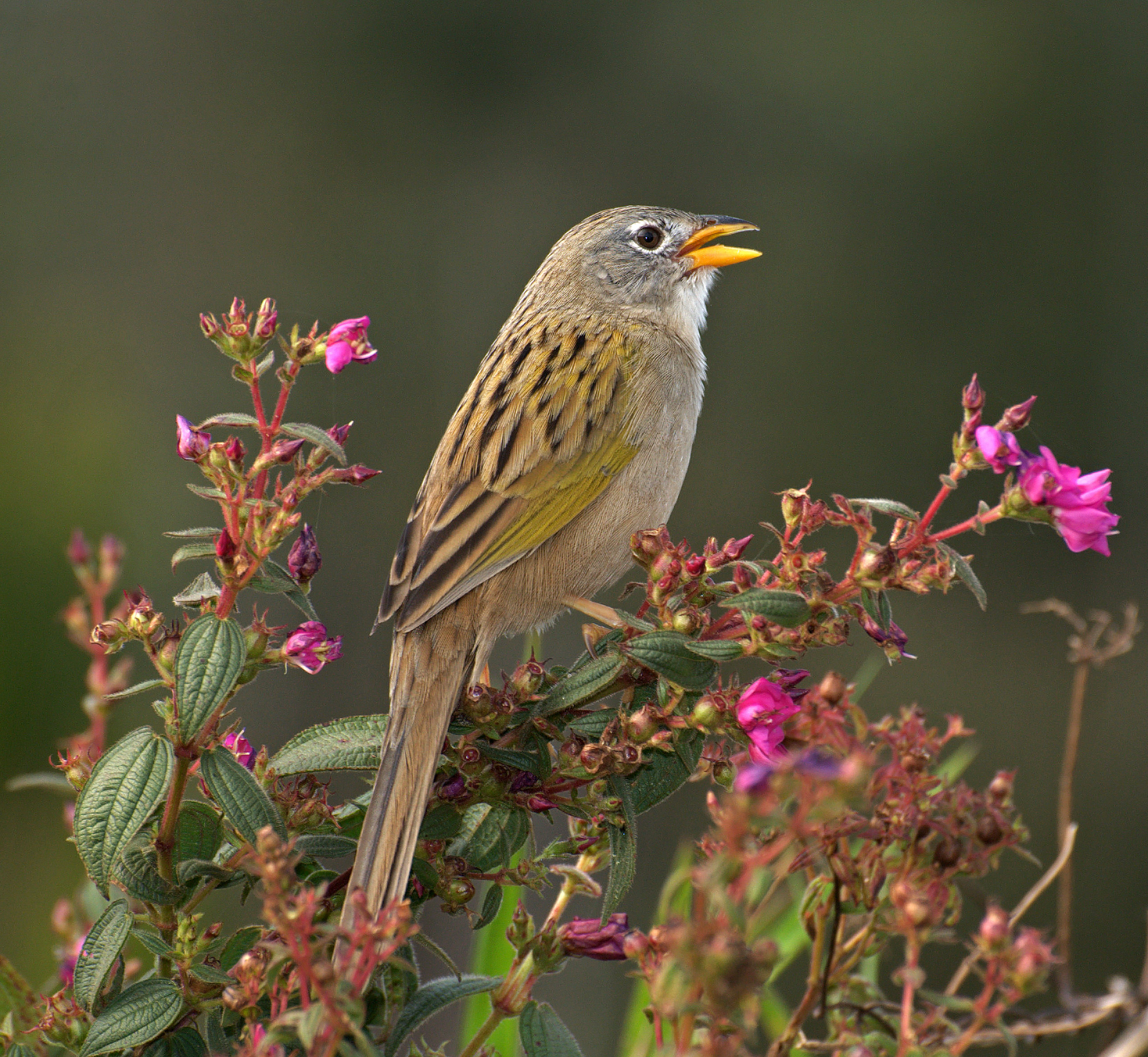
At a nature reserve in Piraju, Brazil

Singing at the reserve

Singing at the reserve

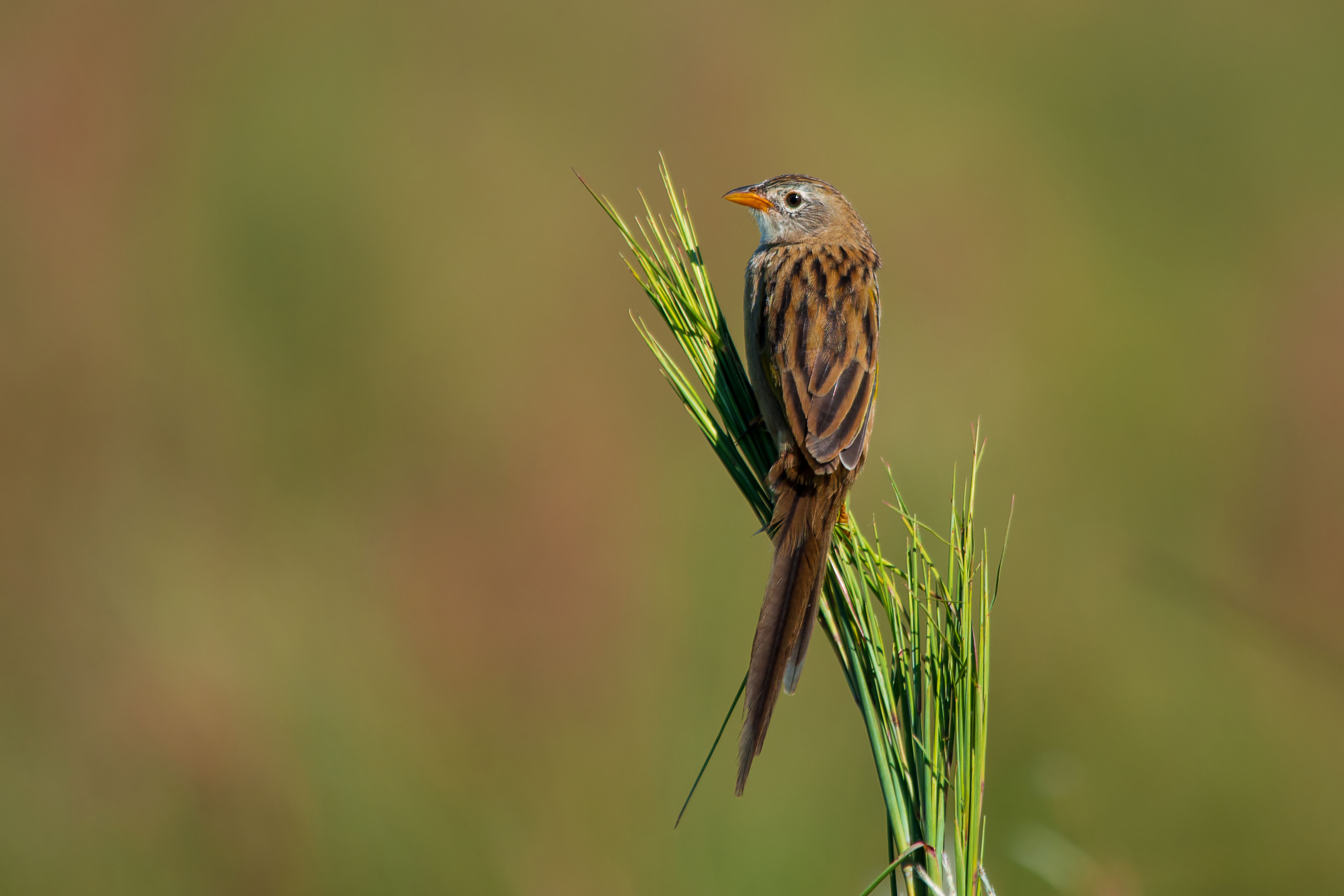
In Terenos, Mato Grosso do Sul, Brazil
