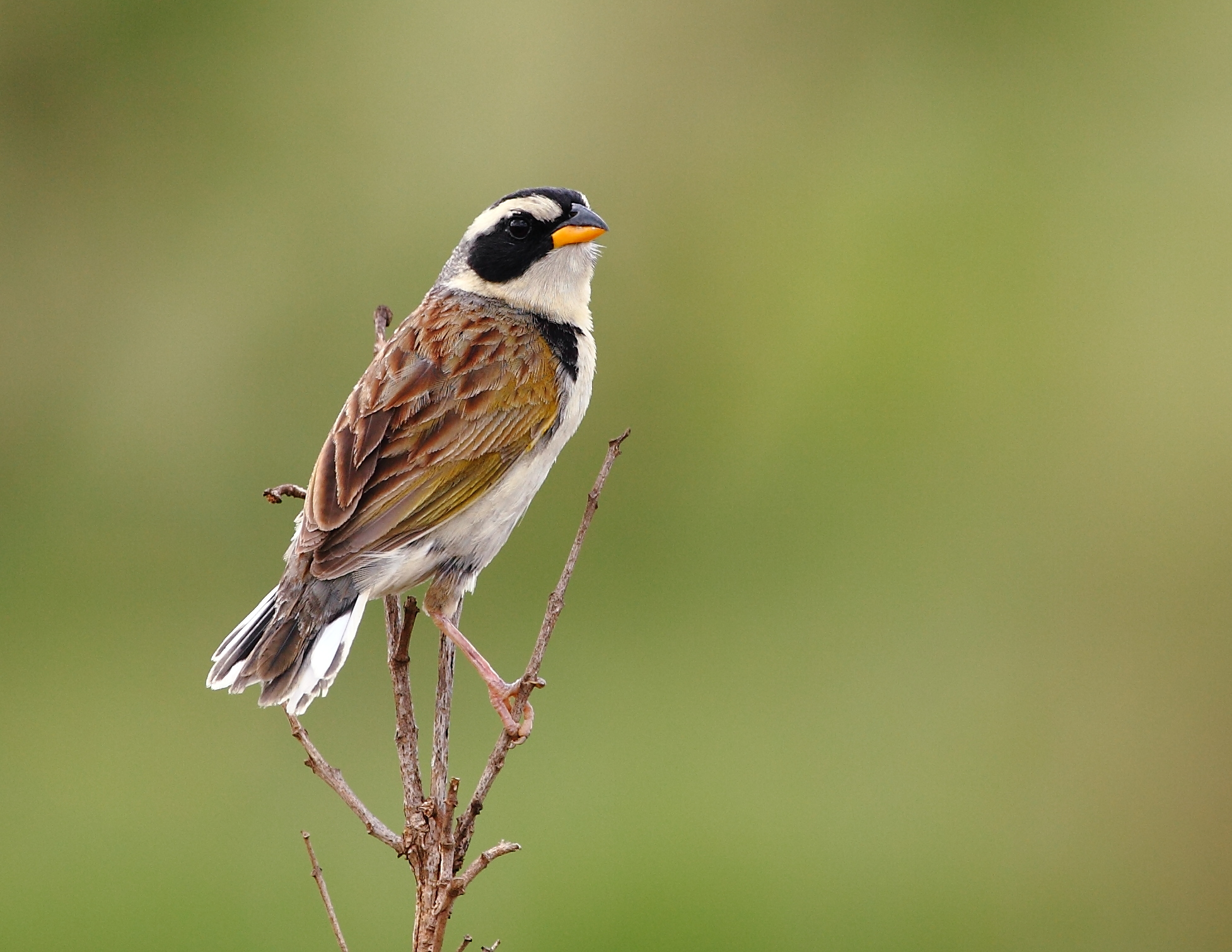
- Black-masked finch at Serra da Canastra National Park, Minas Gerais State, Brazil

Conservation status
- Vulnerable (IUCN 3.1)

Scientific classification
- Kingdom: Animalia
- Phylum: Chordata
- Class: Aves
- Order: Passeriformes
- Family: Thraupidae
- Genus: Coryphaspiza; G.R. Gray, 1840
- Species: C. melanotis

Binomial name
- Coryphaspiza melanotis (Temminck, 1822)

Synonyms
- Emberizoides melanotis (protonym)

= Black-masked finch =

Species of bird

The black-masked finch (Coryphaspiza melanotis) is a Vulnerable species of bird in the family Thraupidae, the tanagers and allies. It is found in Argentina, Bolivia, Brazil, Paraguay, and Peru.

== Taxonomy and systematics ==
The black-masked finch was formally described in 1822 by the Dutch zoologist Coenraad Jacob Temminck with the binomial Emberizoides melanotis. The type locality is São Paulo, Brazil. The species is now placed in the genus Coryphaspiza that was introduced by George Robert Gray in 1840 with the black-masked finch as the type species. The genus name combines the Ancient Greek koruphē meaning "crown of the head" with spiza meaning "finch". The specific epithet melanotis combines the Ancient Greek melas meaning "black" with -ōtis meaning "-eared".

When Gray erected genus Coryphaspiza he retained it in the subfamily Emberizinae of the family Emberizidae, which at the time included both New World sparrows and New World buntings. A molecular phylogenetic study published in 2014 found that the black-masked finch belonged in the tanager family Thraupidae. Within Thraupidae the black-masked finch is now placed with genera Embernagra and Emberizoides in the subfamily Emberizoidinae.

The black-masked finch has two subspecies, the nominate C. m. melanotis (Temminck, 1822) and C. m. marajoara Sick.

== Description ==
The black-masked finch is about 13.5 cm (5.3 in) long and weighs about 16 g (0.56 oz). The sexes have the same plumage. Adults of the nominate subspecies have a black forehead and crown, a long and wide white supercilium, and a large triangular black mask from the lores to the grayish nape. Most individuals have a black-streaked, grayish olive mantle and upper back and a grayish lower back and rump. Their upperwing is greenish, their marginal coverts yellow, their inner greater coverts grayish, and their tertials greenish with grayish edges. (Some instead have a pale-edged chestnut-brown mantle, scapulars, greater coverts, and tertials.) Their tail's innermost pair of feathers are gray and the rest blackish with large white tips on the inner web. Their throat is white; their underparts are also white with a black spur on the side of the breast, blackish patches or streaking on the flanks, and sometimes a creamy buff tinge throughout. They have a dark iris, a stout thick-based bill with a black maxilla and a bright yellow mandible, and dull pink legs and feet. Subspecies C. m. marajoara is slightly smaller than the nominate and has wider and blacker streaks on it its back.

== Distribution and habitat ==
The black-masked finch has a disjunct distribution; the subspecies are widely separated. The nominate subspecies has the more southerly and by far the larger range. It is found from the Pampas del Heath in extreme southeastern Madre de Dios Department in southeastern Peru east across northern Bolivia into western Brazil. In Brazil its range is roughly bounded by a line from the Bolivian border in west-central Mato Grosso east to northern Goiás, then southeast to southeastern Minas Gerais, and then west into Paraguay and extreme northeastern Argentina from western Paraná. Subspecies C. m. marajoara is found only on Marajó Island in the Amazon Delta of northeastern Brazil. A few records in eastern Brazil's Rio Grande do Norte have not been assigned to a subspecies.

The black-masked finch inhabits tall and tussock grasslands with minimal shrubs. In elevation it ranges from near sea level to 1,200 m (3,900 ft).

== Behavior ==
=== Movement ===
The black-masked finch is a year-round resident.

=== Feeding ===
The black-masked finch's diet is not known. In the breeding season it typically forages in pairs and may form flocks in the non-breeding season. It usually forages under grass but sometimes on bare soil.

=== Breeding ===
The black-masked finch is thought to breed between September and December but nothing else is known about its breeding biology.

=== Vocalization ===
The black-masked finch's song is "high-pitched and insect-like, a set of paired notes so closely spaced as to sound like one frequency-modulated note, tziieeep, repeated at intervals of c. 2 seconds". A variant is "tziieep...tsi-tsíp...zz-tzzz...". Its call is "a high-pitched tsiip".

== Status ==
The IUCN originally in 1988 assessed the black-masked finch as Threatened and since 1994 as Vulnerable. Its estimated population of between 6000 and 15,000 mature individuals is believed to be decreasing. "Suitable grasslands are being rapidly destroyed by mechanised agriculture, intensive cattle-ranching, afforestation, invasive grasses, excessive use of pesticides and annual burning." The species is considered "uncommon to rare" in Brazil. It does occur in many nominally protected areas but in some the protection is inadequately enforced.
