= Duida grass finch =

Conservation status
- Data Deficient (IUCN 3.1)

Scientific classification
- Kingdom: Animalia
- Phylum: Chordata
- Class: Aves
- Order: Passeriformes
- Family: Thraupidae
- Genus: Emberizoides
- Species: E. duidae

Binomial name
- Emberizoides duidae Chapman, 1929

Species of bird

The Duida grass finch (Emberizoides duidae) is a species of bird in the family Thraupidae, the tanagers and allies. It is endemic to Cerro Duida, a tepui in Venezuela, and is known only from specimens collected in 1928 to 1929 and in the 1950s.

== Taxonomy and systematics ==
The Duida grass finch was formally described in 1929 with its current binomial Emberizoides duidae. At the time the genus Emberizoides was included in a large family of Old and New World species, Emberizidae. A molecular phylogenetic study published in 2014 found that the Duida grass finch belonged in the tanager family Thraupidae. Some authors have treated the Duida grass finch and the wedge-tailed grass finch (E. herbicola) as conspecific. A 1982 publication confirmed them as separate species. The Duida grass finch, wedge-tailed grass finch, and the lesser grass finch (E. ypiranganus) are the only members of the genus Emberizoides.

The Duida grass finch is monotypic.

== Description ==
The Duida grass finch is about 22 cm (8.7 in) long. It has a long pointed tail and a moderately thick bill. The sexes have the same plumage. Adults have a blackish forehead and a blackish crown with thin brown streaks. They have a mostly dark brownish face with darker lores, a whitish supercilium just to the eye, and a thin whitish eye-ring. Their mantle and scapulars are olive with bold blackish streaks. The rest of their upperparts are mostly steaked with even amounts with cinnamon-brown and blackish. Their wings are mostly brownish with wide bright yellow-green edges. Their tail feathers have dark centers and brown edges. Their throat is whitish buff. They have a brownish band across the breast, buff flanks, and a white belly; the flanks and vent have darker streaks. They have a dark brown iris, a yellowish bill with a blackish culmen, and brownish legs feet. Juveniles are similar to adults with but with streaks on the breast and a buffy belly.

== Distribution and habitat ==
The Duida grass finch is known only from Venezuela's Cerro Duida, a tepui in central Amazonas state. It inhabits savanna at elevations between 1,300 and 2,100 m (4,300 and 6,900 ft).

== Behavior ==
The Duida grass finch is assumed to be a sedentary year-round resident. Because it is not known in life, there is no information on any aspect of its biology.

== Status ==
The IUCN originally in 1988 assessed the Duida grass finch as being of Least Concern, then in 2000 as Near Threatened, and since 2021 as Data Deficient. "There is no current or historical information on the population size and trend. The species's presumed range and habitat appear secure and not under imminent threats, but the status of the population is unknown...owing to the largely inaccessible nature of the isolated Pantepui region, its habitat remains relatively undisturbed. However, the effects of catastrophic events, such as a major conflagration, could be serious, since tepui vegetation tends not to regrow but is replaced by bracken Pteridium". Cerro Duida is entirely within Duida–Marahuaca National Park.
