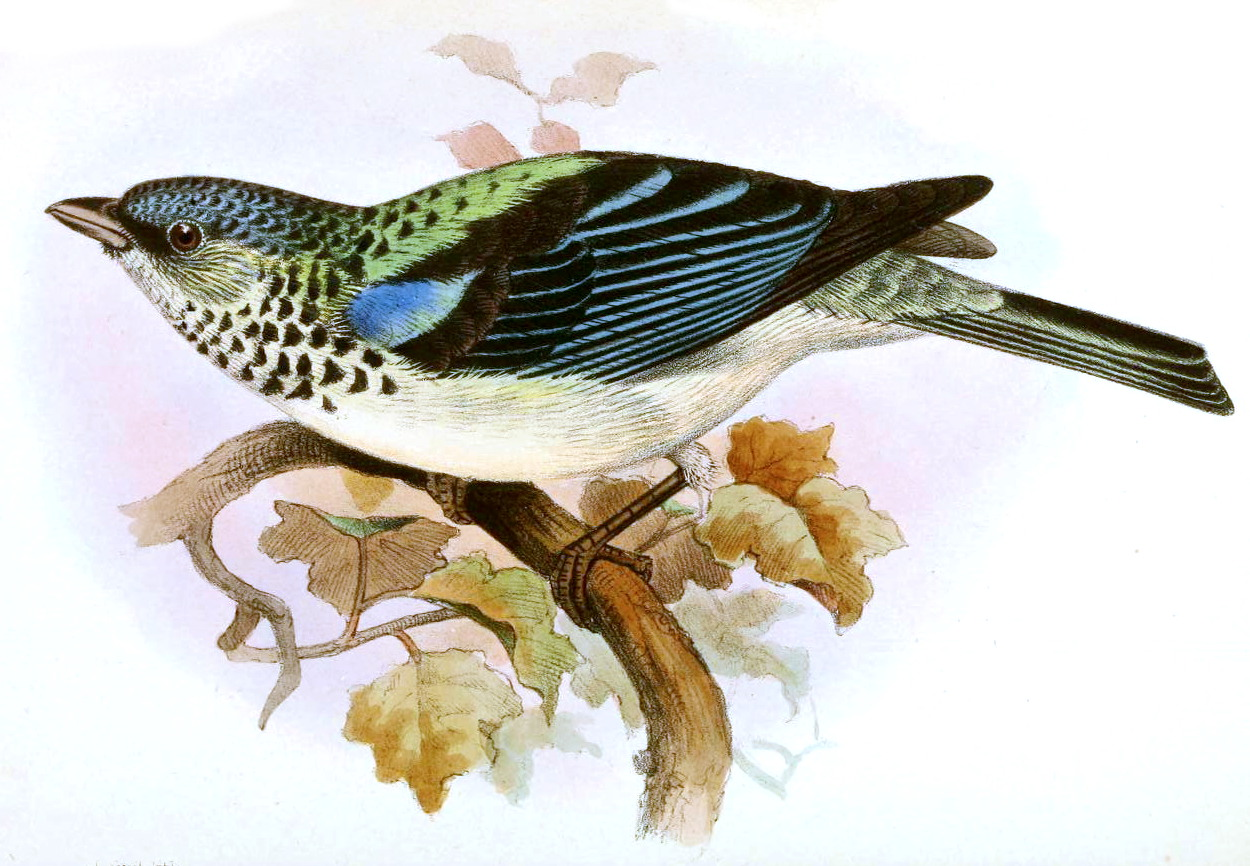

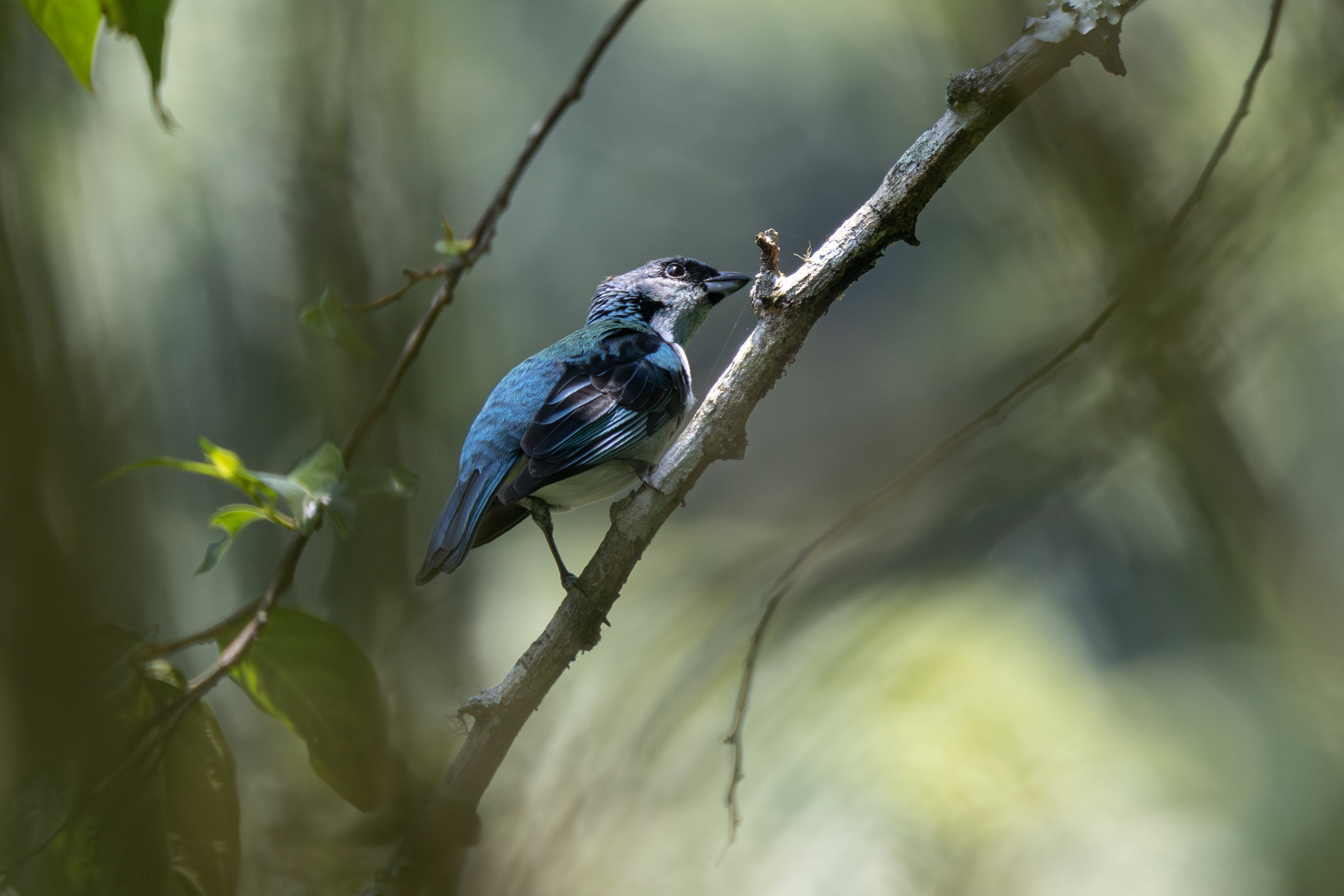

Conservation status
- Vulnerable (IUCN 3.1)

Scientific classification
- Kingdom: Animalia
- Phylum: Chordata
- Class: Aves
- Order: Passeriformes
- Family: Thraupidae
- Genus: Poecilostreptus
- Species: P. cabanisi

Binomial name
- Poecilostreptus cabanisi (PL Sclater, 1868)

Synonyms
- Calliste cabanisi PL Sclater, 1868; Poecilostreptus cabanisi; Tangara bangsi

= Azure-rumped tanager =

Species of bird

The azure-rumped tanager or Cabanis's tanager (Poecilostreptus cabanisi) is a species of bird in the family Thraupidae. It is a local resident in humid broadleaf forests and adjacent plantations of the Pacific slope of western Guatemala and southern Chiapas, Mexico. It has been reported at elevations of 850–1,900 m (2,790–6,230 ft).

== Description ==
Its plumage is mostly pale blue, with a purplish-blue crown, dark lores and lower auriculars, and distinctive dark spots across the chest. The mantle is mottled greenish-blue and black. The wings and tail are black with blue edgings. The bill is gray with a dark tip. Cabanis's tanagers utter several sibilant vocalizations, hard trills and twitters.

The azure-rumped tanager is omnivorous, feeding on fruit and arthropods. In Guatemala, abundance was positively correlated with the density of Ficus aurea trees. Figs of that tree are a main food source. The nesting season ranges from April to September, during which azure-rumped tanagers move in pairs or family groups. Cooperative breeding has been reported. Outside the breeding season, larger flocks of up to 18 birds have been reported.

The azure-rumped tanager is identified as Vulnerable by the IUCN due to deforestation used to convert forest land into coffee plantations. In Guatemala, only 21% or 25,000 ha (62,000 acres) of the potential area of distribution are still covered with broadleaf forest, the tanager's prime habitat. 80,000 ha or 68% of the potential area of distribution is covered with coffee plantations. It is estimated that there are 8,250–23,250 birds left in Guatemala. For Chiapas, there is no recent estimate, but in the 1980s there were 112,000 ha of suitable habitat, which is expected to be much smaller now due to a growing human population and increased pressure by agricultural activities.

The tanager has traditionally been positioned close to the grey-and-gold tanager, in relatedness studies. More current research choose not to include the azure-rumped tanager due to a lack of solid information on the species and its genetics.
