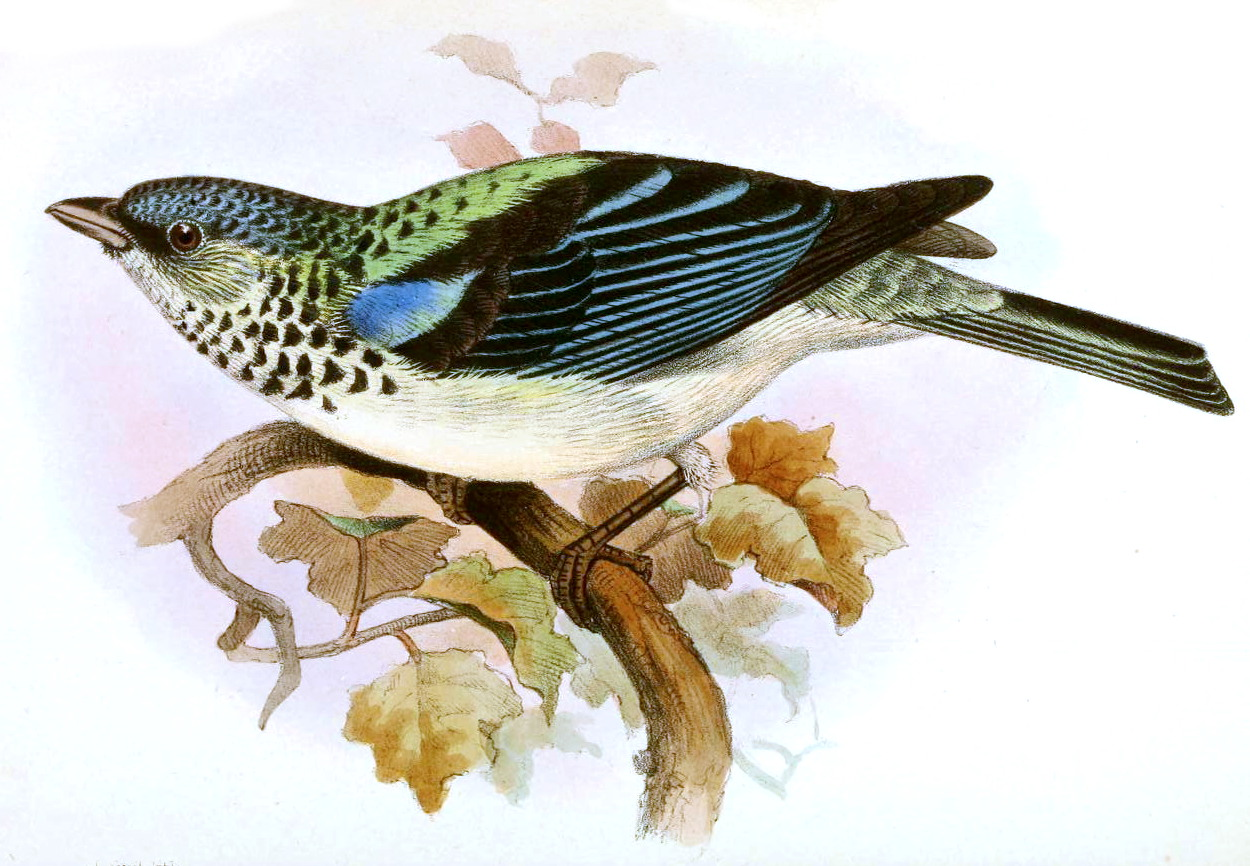
- Azure-rumped tanager (Poecilostreptus cabanisi)

Scientific classification
- Kingdom: Animalia
- Phylum: Chordata
- Class: Aves
- Order: Passeriformes
- Family: Thraupidae
- Genus: Poecilostreptus; Burns, KJ, Unitt & Mason, NA, 2016

Type species
- Calospiza palmeri Hellmayr, 1909

= Poecilostreptus =

Genus of birds

Poecilostreptus is a genus of birds in the tanager family Thraupidae.

== Taxonomy and species list ==
These species were formerly placed in the genus Tangara. A molecular phylogenetic study published in 2014 found that Tangara was polyphyletic. In the rearrangement to create monophyletic genera, the new genus, Poecilostreptus, was erected with the grey-and-gold tanager as the type species. The genus name combines the Ancient Greek ποικίλος/poikílo meaning "spotted" or "dappled" and στρεπτός/streptós meaning "collar".

The genus contains the following two species:

Genus Poecilostreptus – Burns, Unitt & Mason, 2016 – two species
| Common name | Scientific name and subspecies | Range | Size and ecology | IUCN status and estimated population |
|---|---|---|---|---|
| Azure-rumped tanager | Poecilostreptus cabanisi (Sclater, 1868) | Local resident on the Pacific slope of western Guatemala and southern Chiapas, Mexico | Size: Habitat: Humid broadleaf forests and adjacent plantations, at 850–1,900 m (2,800–6,200 ft) Diet: Omnivorous: fruit and arthropods; figs of Ficus aurea are a main food source; in pairs or family groups during the nesting season, and in flocks of up to 18 outside it | VU 8,250–23,250 individuals in Guatemala; no recent estimate for Chiapas |
| Grey-and-gold tanager | Poecilostreptus palmeri (Hellmayr, 1909) | Colombia, Ecuador and Panama: Serranía del Darién and the western Andean slope of Colombia and Ecuador | Size: Habitat: Subtropical or tropical moist lowland forests and subtropical or tropical moist montane forests Diet: | LC |
