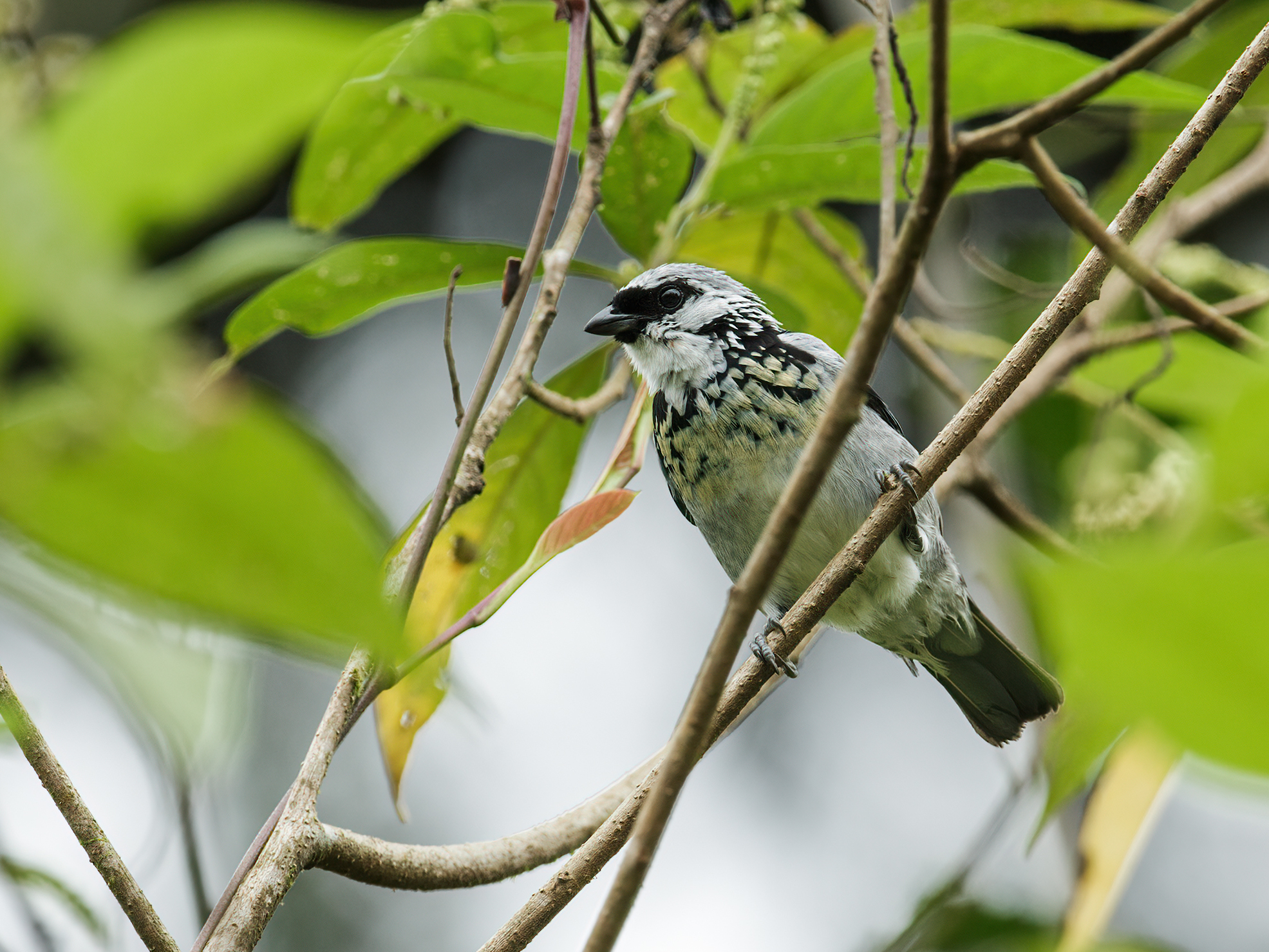

Conservation status
- Least Concern (IUCN 3.1)

Scientific classification
- Kingdom: Animalia
- Phylum: Chordata
- Class: Aves
- Order: Passeriformes
- Family: Thraupidae
- Genus: Poecilostreptus
- Species: P. palmeri

Binomial name
- Poecilostreptus palmeri (Hellmayr, 1909)

Synonyms
- Tangara palmeri

= Grey-and-gold tanager =

Species of bird

The grey-and-gold tanager (Poecilostreptus palmeri) is a species of bird in the family Thraupidae. It is found in Colombia, Ecuador, and Panama (Serranía del Darién and western Andean slope of Colombia and Ecuador). Its natural habitats are subtropical or tropical moist lowland forests and subtropical or tropical moist montane forests.

== Gallery ==
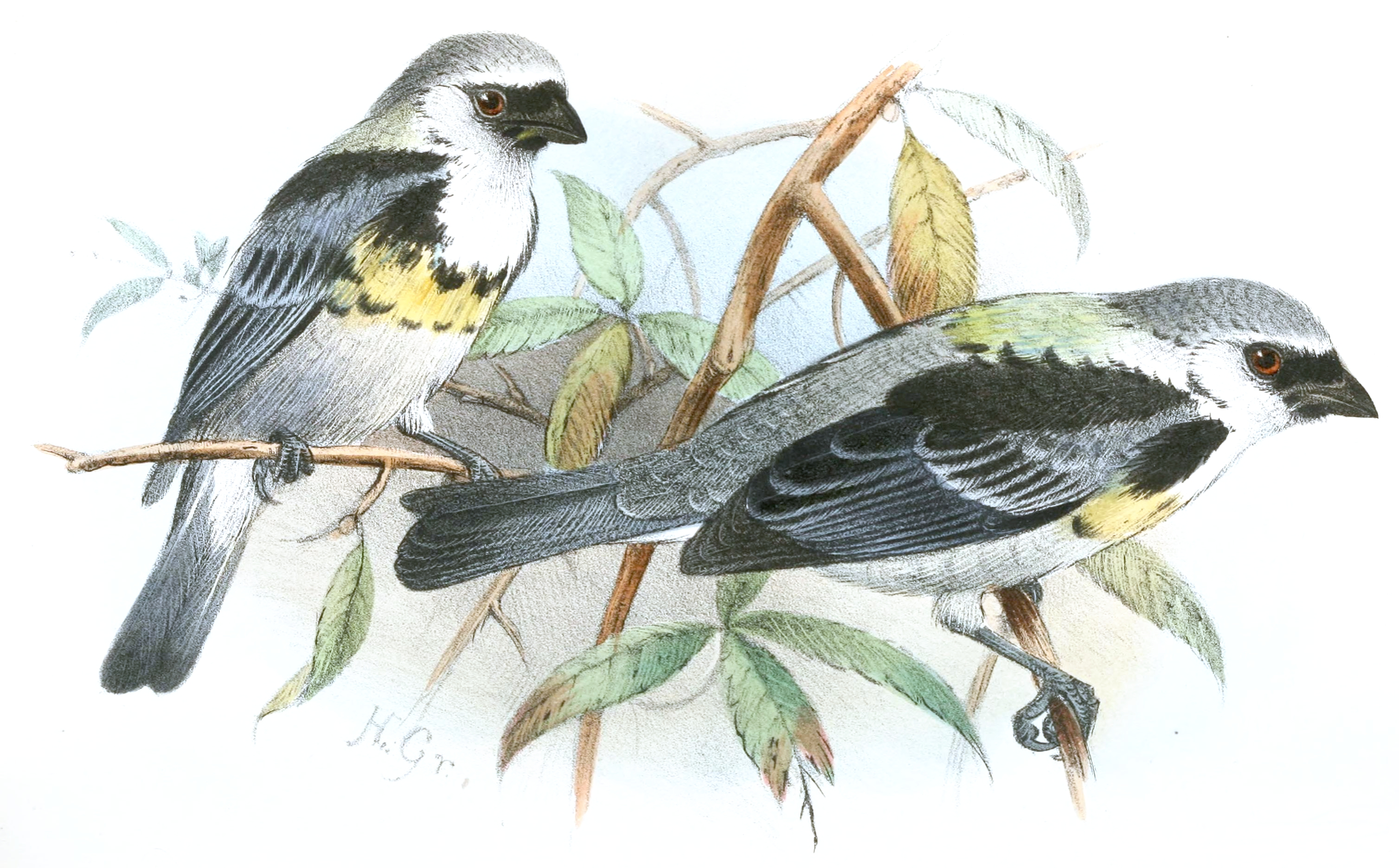
Grey-and-gold tanager by Henrik Gronvold, 1910

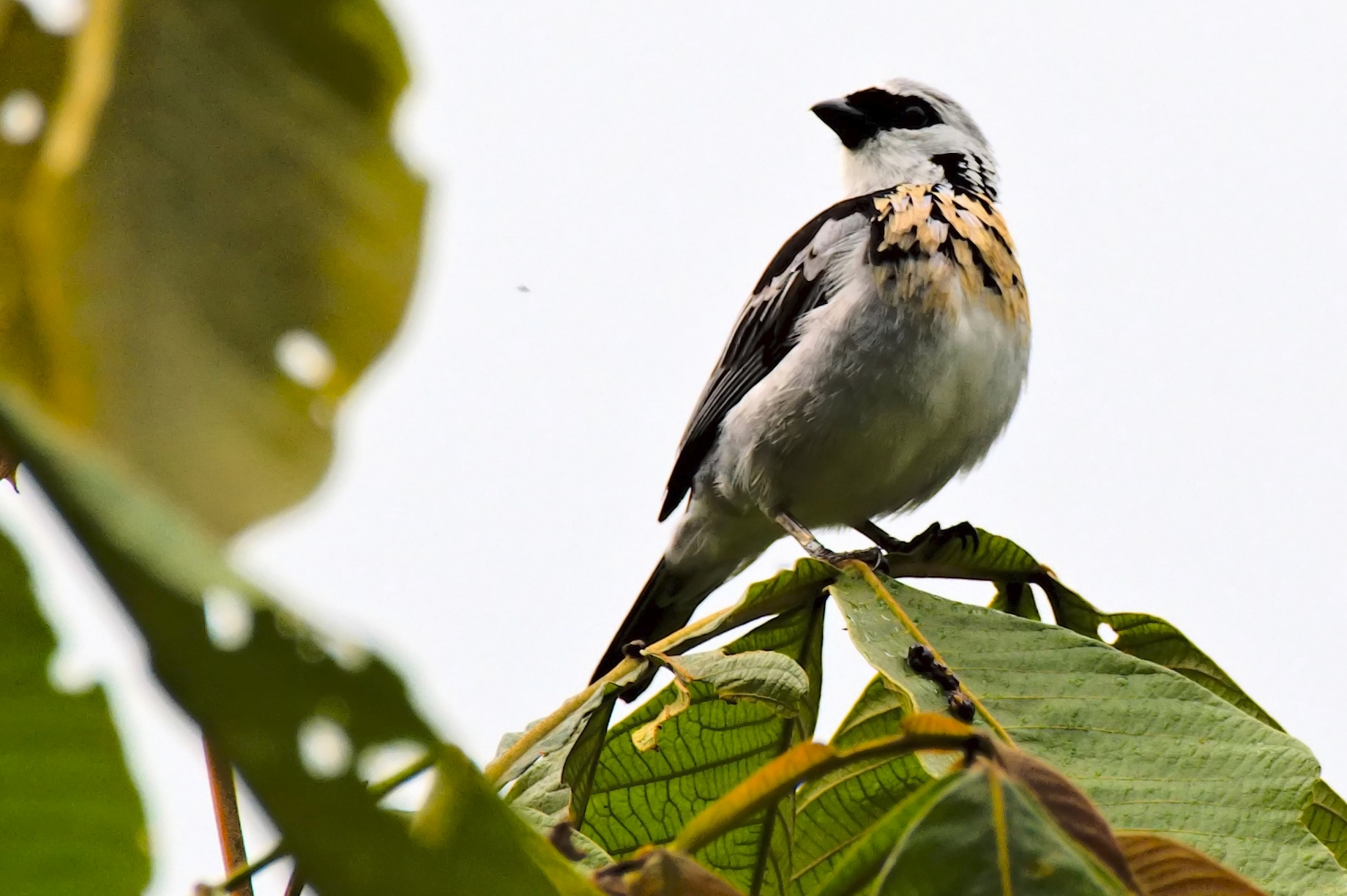
Grey-and-gold tanager
