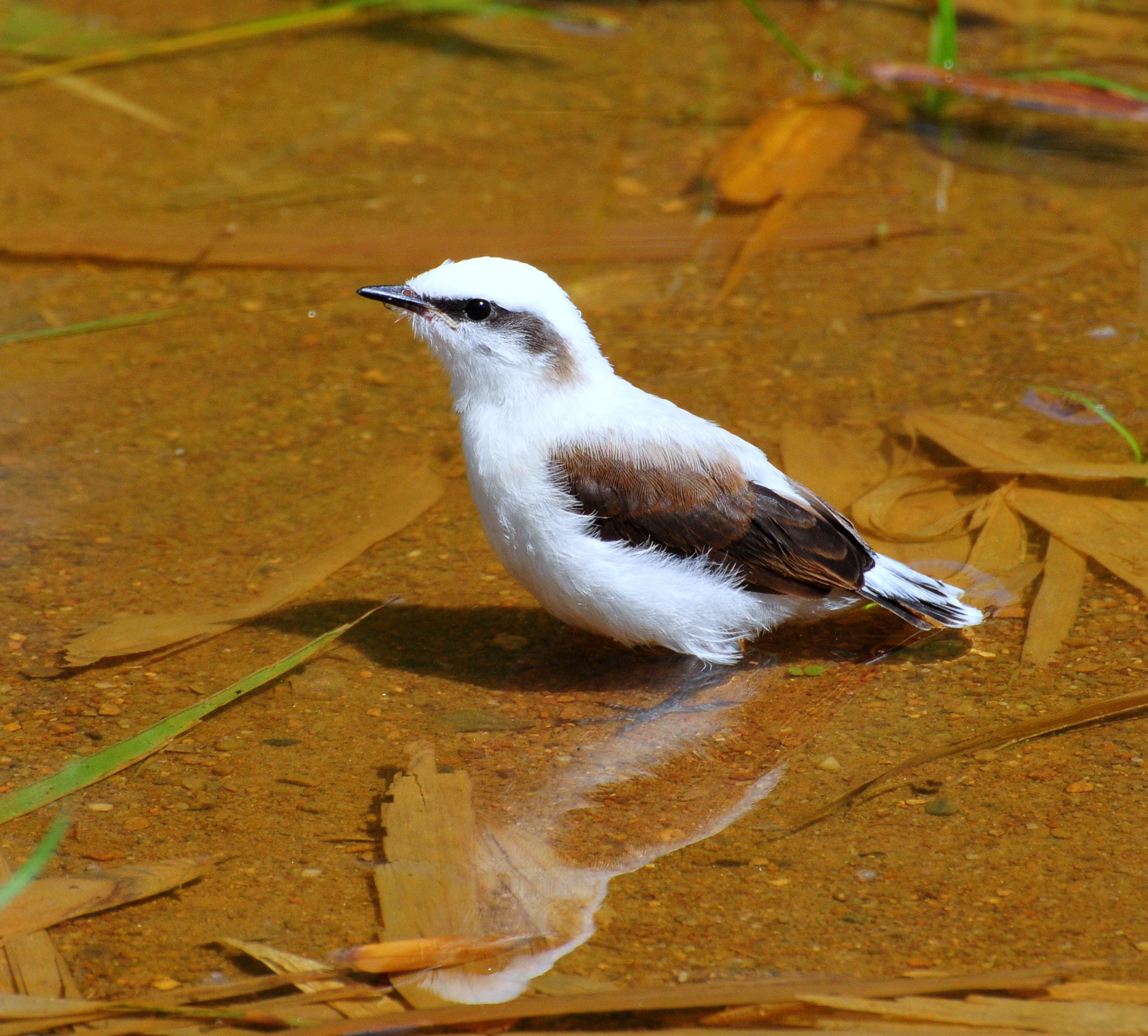
- Fluvicola nengeta

Scientific classification
- Kingdom: Animalia
- Phylum: Chordata
- Class: Aves
- Order: Passeriformes
- Family: Tyrannidae
- Subfamily: Fluvicolinae; Swainson, 1831

= Fluvicolinae =

Subfamily of birds

Fluvicolinae is a subfamily of passerine birds in the tyrant flycatcher family Tyrannidae, encompassing species widely distributed across the Americas. The subfamily includes 130 species that are divided into five tribes and 39 genera.

== Taxonomy ==
Broad studies in molecular genetics performed by Tello et al. (2009) discovered a large number of new relationships within the family Tyrannidae that were not reflected in the majority of species classified as part of the family. Following these studies, Ohlson et al. (2013) proposed a reorganization and division of the family Tyrannidae, which according to the proposal would divide the family into the subfamilies Fluvicolinae, Hirundineinae Tello, Moyle, Marchese & Cracraft, 2009, Muscigrallinae Ohlson, Irestedt, Ericson & Fjeldså, 2013, Tyranninae Vigors, 1825 and Elaeniinae, Cabanis & Heine, 1859–60.

The cladogram below is based on a large molecular phylogentic study of the suboscines by Michael Harvey and collaborators that was published in 2020. The taxonomy follows the list of world birds maintained by Frank Gill, Pamela C. Rasmussen and David Donsker on behalf of the International Ornithological Committee (IOC). The tribes are those proposed by Jan Ohlson and collaborators in 2020 other than the genus Muscigralla that is placed in the tribe Muscigrallini rather than a separate subfamily Muscigrallinae.

- Fluvicolinae
  - Muscigrallini
    Muscigralla – short-tailed field tyrant
  - - Ochthoecini
      - Myiophobus – flycatchers (8 species)
      - - Silvicultrix – chat-tyrants (5 species)
        - - Colorhamphus – patagonian tyrant
          - - Tumbezia – Tumbes tyrant
            - Ochthoeca – chat-tyrants (9 species)
    - - Fluvicolini
        - - Phelpsia – white-bearded flycatcher
          - - Guyramemua – Chapada flycatcher
            - Sublegatus – scrub flycatchers (3 species)
        - - Colonia – long-tailed tyrant
          - - - Arundinicola – white-headed marsh tyrant
              - Fluvicola – water tyrants (3 species)
            - - Pyrocephalus – flycatchers (4 species)
              - - Muscipipra – shear-tailed grey tyrant
                - - Gubernetes – streamer-tailed tyrant
                  - - Heteroxolmis – black-and-white monjita
                    - Alectrurus – tailed tyrants (2 species)
      - - Xolmiini
          - - Muscisaxicola – ground tyrants (12 species)
            - - Satrapa – yellow-browed tyrant
              - Syrtidicola – little ground tyrant
          - - Lessonia – negritos (2 species)
            - - - Hymenops – spectacled tyrant
                - Knipolegus – black tyrants (12 species)
              - - Cnemarchus – bush tyrants (2 species)
                - - Xolmis – monjitas (2 species)
                  - - Pyrope – fire-eyed diucon
                    - - - Nengetus – grey monjita
                        - Neoxolmis – monjitas (4 species)
                      - - Agriornis – shrike-tyrant (5 species)
                        - Myiotheretes – bush tyrants (4 species)
        - Contopini
          - - Ochthornis – drab water tyrant
            - - Cnemotriccus – fuscous flycatcher
              - - Aphanotriccus – flycatchers (2 species)
                - Lathrotriccus – flycatchers (2 species)
          - - Xenotriccus – flycatchers (2 species)
            - - - Sayornis – phoebes (3 species)
                - Empidonax – flycatchers (14 species)
              - - Mitrephanes – tufted flycatchers (2 species)
                - Contopus – pewees + flycatcher (16 species)

== Tribes and genera ==
The subfamily is grouped into the following 5 tribes and 39 genera:

- Muscigrallini Ohlson, Irestedt, Ericson & Fjeldså, 2013
  - Muscigralla – short-tailed field tyrant
- Ochthoecini Ohlson, Irestedt, Batalha Filho, Ericson & Fjeldså, 2020
  - Myiophobus – flycatchers (8 species)
  - Silvicultrix – chat-tyrants (5 species)
  - Colorhamphus – patagonian tyrant
  - Tumbezia – Tumbes tyrant
  - Ochthoeca – chat-tyrants (9 species)
- Fluvicolini Swainson, 1831
  - Phelpsia – white-bearded flycatcher
  - Guyramemua – Chapada flycatcher
  - Sublegatus – scrub flycatchers (3 species)
  - Colonia – long-tailed tyrant
  - Arundinicola – white-headed marsh tyrant
  - Fluvicola – water tyrants (3 species)
  - Pyrocephalus – flycatchers (4 species)
  - Muscipipra – shear-tailed grey tyrant
  - Gubernetes – streamer-tailed tyrant
  - Heteroxolmis – black-and-white monjita
  - Alectrurus – tailed tyrants (2 species)

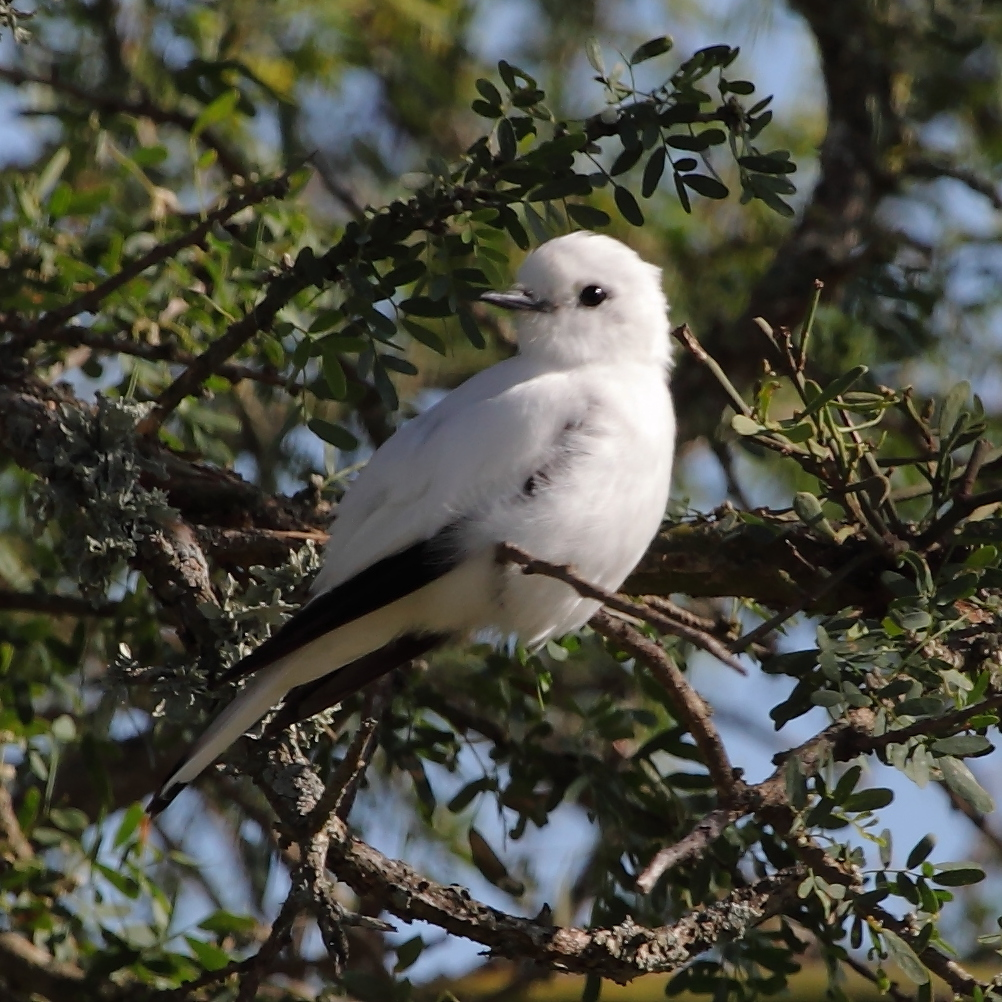
Xolmis irupero

- Xolmiini Tello, Moyle, Marchese & Cracraft, 2009
  - Muscisaxicola – ground tyrants (12 species)
  - Satrapa – yellow-browed tyrant
  - Syrtidicola – little ground tyrant
  - Lessonia – negritos (2 species)
  - Hymenops – spectacled tyrant
  - Knipolegus – black tyrants (12 species)
  - Cnemarchus – bush tyrants (2 species)
  - Xolmis – monjitas (2 species)
  - Pyrope – fire-eyed diucon
  - Nengetus – grey monjita
  - Neoxolmis – monjitas (4 species)
  - Myiotheretes – bush tyrants (4 species)

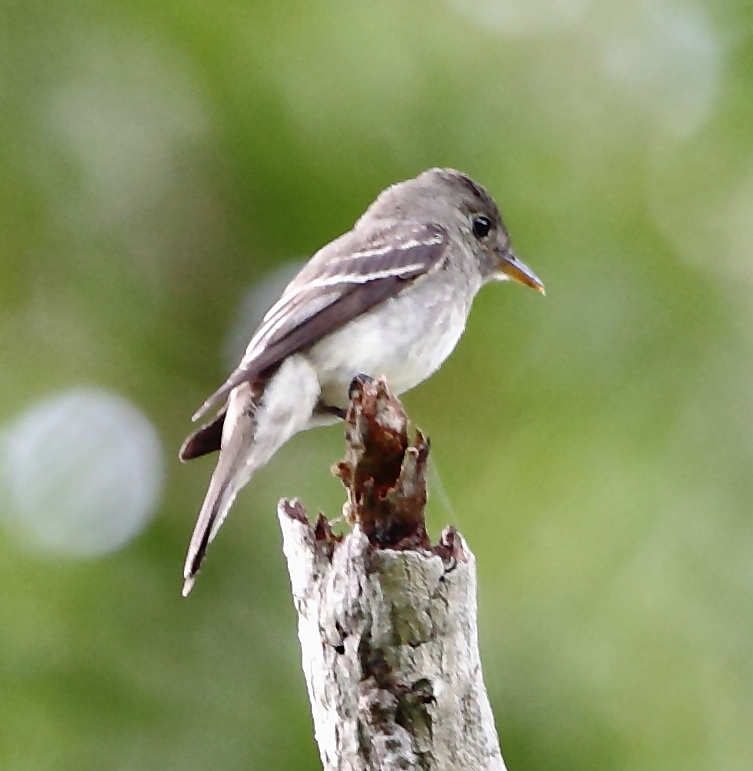
Contopus virens

- Contopini Fitzpatrick, 2004
  - Ochthornis – drab water tyrant
  - Cnemotriccus – fuscous flycatcher
  - Aphanotriccus – flycatchers (2 species)
  - Lathrotriccus – flycatchers (2 species)
  - Xenotriccus – flycatchers (2 species)
  - Sayornis – phoebes (3 species)
  - Empidonax – flycatchers (14 species)
  - Mitrephanes – tufted flycatchers (2 species)
  - Contopus – pewees + flycatcher (16 species)
