= Vetula =

Vetula means "old woman" in Latin connotation being more like witch than other and may refer to:

- Vetula, a 7th-century name for corn dolly, a form of straw work

== See also ==
- Ortalis vetula, a species of bird
- Saurothera vetula, a species of cuckoo
- Balistes vetula, a species of triggerfish
- Muscipipra vetula, a species of bird
