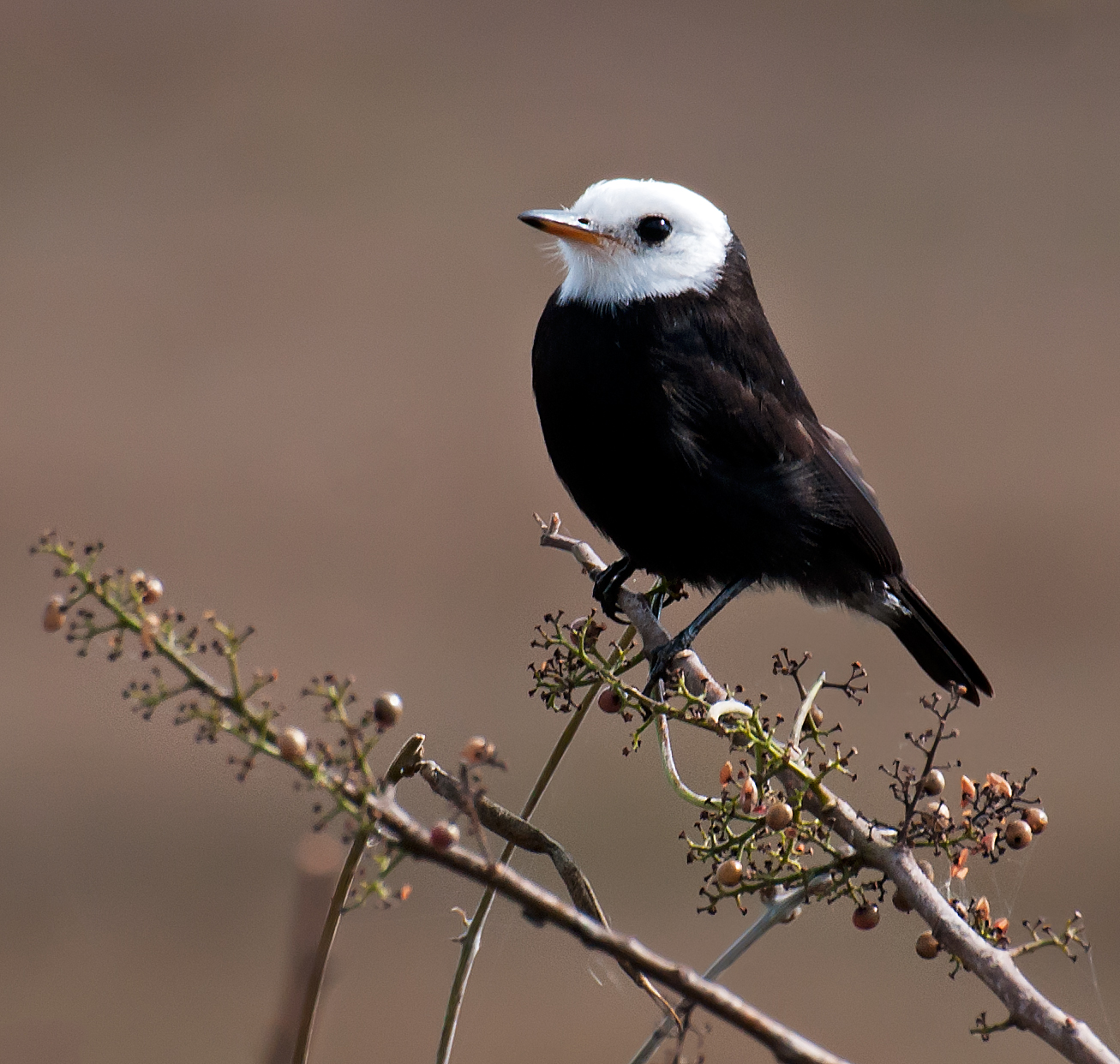
- Male in São Paulo, Brazil
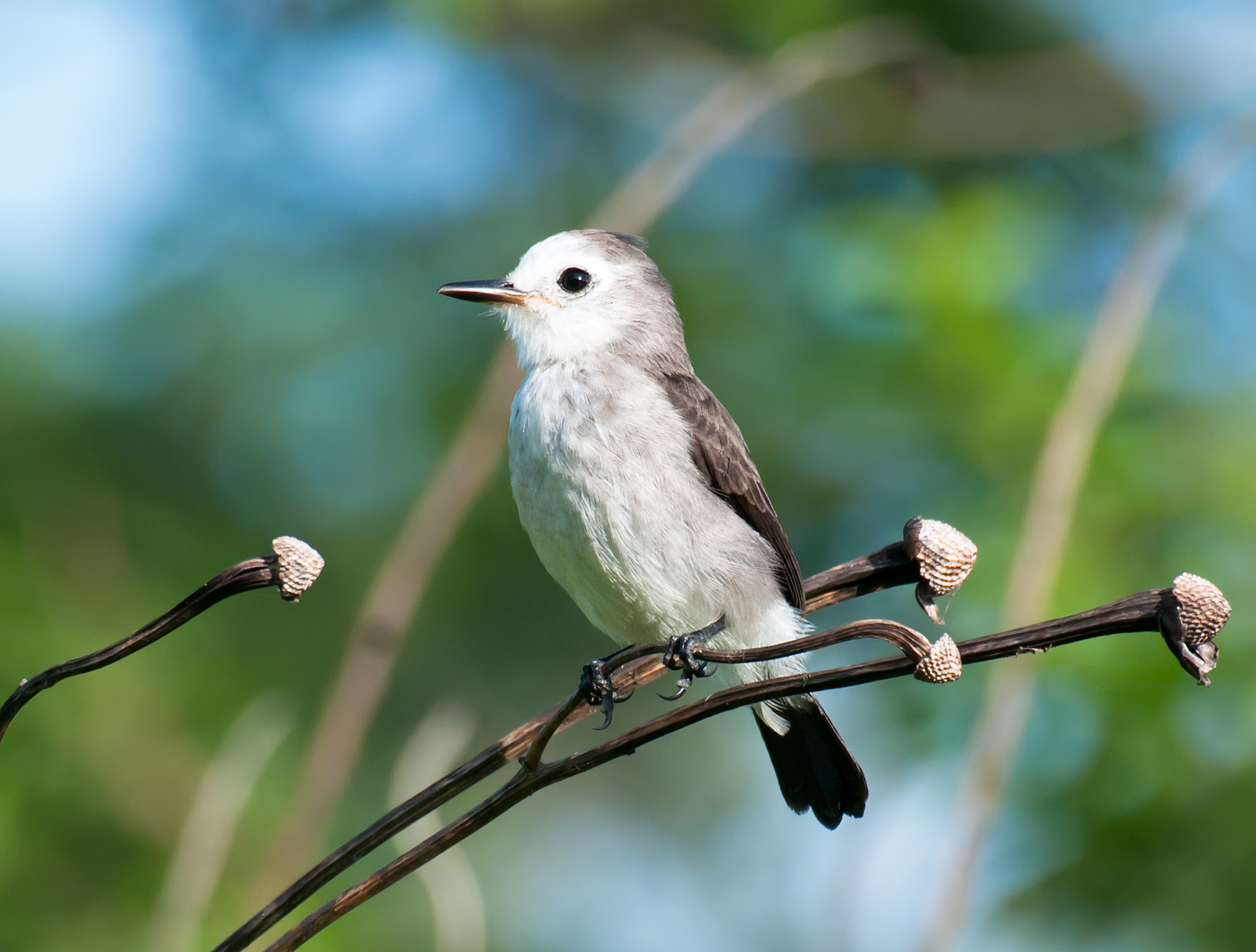
- Female in São Paulo, Brazil

Conservation status
- Least Concern (IUCN 3.1)

Scientific classification
- Kingdom: Animalia
- Phylum: Chordata
- Class: Aves
- Order: Passeriformes
- Family: Tyrannidae
- Genus: Arundinicola d'Orbigny, 1840
- Species: A. leucocephala

Binomial name
- Arundinicola leucocephala (Linnaeus, 1764)

Synonyms
- Pipra leucocephala Linnaeus, 1764

= White-headed marsh tyrant =

Species of bird

The white-headed marsh tyrant (Arundinicola leucocephala), commonly referred to simply as the marsh tyrant, is a small passerine bird belonging to the tyrant flycatcher family. It is the sole species within the genus Arundinicola. This diurnal bird, exclusively found in South America, exhibits sexual dimorphism and is known to have monogamous mating behavior.

== Description ==
=== Males ===
Male marsh tyrants possess a distinct appearance, featuring a white head with a small crest, a white throat, and a contrasting black body. They have dark brown irises, black legs, and a bill that consists of a black upper mandible and a yellow lower mandible. Typically, they weigh around 13 grams and measure approximately 13 centimeters in length.

=== Females ===
Female marsh tyrants have a white forecrown and throat, along with a greyish-brown breast and flanks. Their wings and tail are also greyish-brown, although they are more uniform and significantly darker. The average weight of a female ranges from 12 to 12.5 grams, and she generally measures 13 centimeters in length. Females and juveniles have similar appearances.

== Taxonomy ==
The white-headed marsh tyrant is a monotypic species within the Tyrannidae family, classified under the Fluvicolinae subfamily, which splits into two tribes: Contopini (peewees, phoebes, and allies) and Fluvicolini (ground-tyrants and allies). A. leucocephala, along with 71 other species, belongs to the Fluvicolini tribe. Additionally, it forms a clade with the Black-backed water-tyrant (Fluvicola albiventer), the Pied water-tyrant (Fluvicola pica), and the Masked water-tyrant (Fluvicola nengeta) due to resembling internal anatomical characteristics. Their similar plumages, nesting behaviors, and link to stagnant waters further emphasize their tight connection.

The Latin name of the white-headed marsh tyrant reflects both its habitat and distinctive appearance. The term "Arundo" translates to "reed", while "nicola" means "dweller". Furthermore, "leucocephala" signifies "white head".

== Habitat and distribution ==
The species is native to several South American countries, including Argentina, Bolivia, Brazil, Colombia, Ecuador, French Guiana, Paraguay, Peru, Suriname, Trinidad and Tobago, and Venezuela.

As its name suggests, these tyrants inhabit wetlands in tropical regions, including marshes, bogs, swamps, fens, peatlands, rivers, streams, creeks, and moist savannas. Additionally, many of the previously mentioned countries, such as Brazil, Colombia, Peru, Ecuador, and Paraguay, dedicate a substantial amount of land to rice production. A. leucocephala has been reported as one of the many non-aquatic species found in these ricelands.

A. leucocephala is a resident bird, but it may travel based on rapid turnover and succession in different environments if suitable conditions arise. Some relocated marsh tyrants have been documented from northeastern Peru and northeastern Ecuador along the Napo River.

== Behavior ==
=== Vocalizations ===
They are usually quiet, but they do emit a high-pitched call "sedik!". During courtship, they produce a deeper call "dew-de-lewde", which is repeated at short intervals.

=== Diet ===
A. leucocephala is an insectivores, primarily preying on flying insects including dragonflies, grasshoppers, froghoppers and beetles.

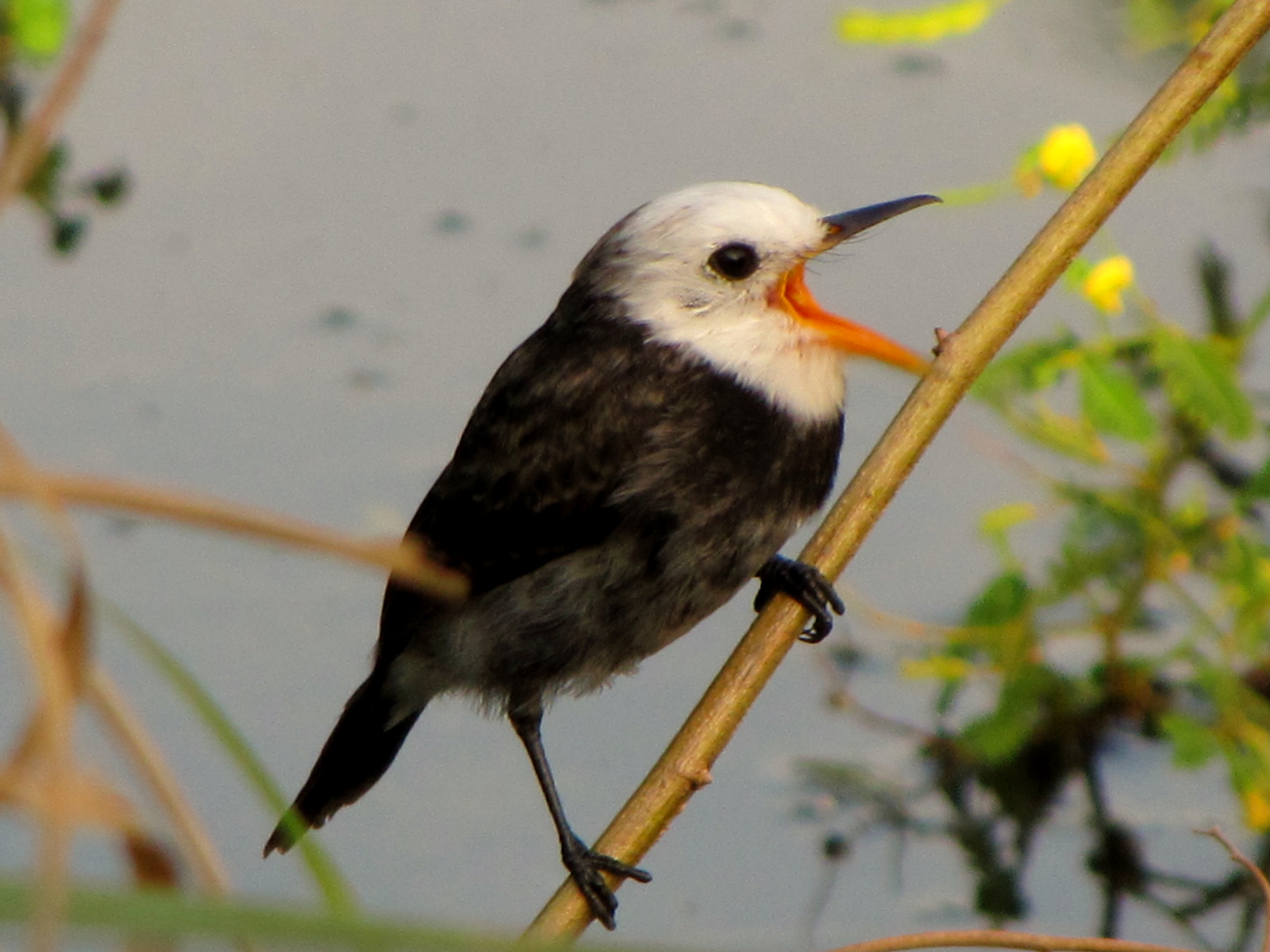
White-headed marsh tyrant vocalizing.

=== Foraging ===
Tyrant flycatchers use many different foraging techniques, such as the sally strike, sally glide, sally hover, sally pounce, leap upward, and leap downward. The choice of technique is often associated with differences in bill, wing, and tarsus structure. The sally strike – attacking in a fluid movement without gliding, hovering, or landing — is the most frequently used foraging maneuver by the white-headed marsh tyrant.

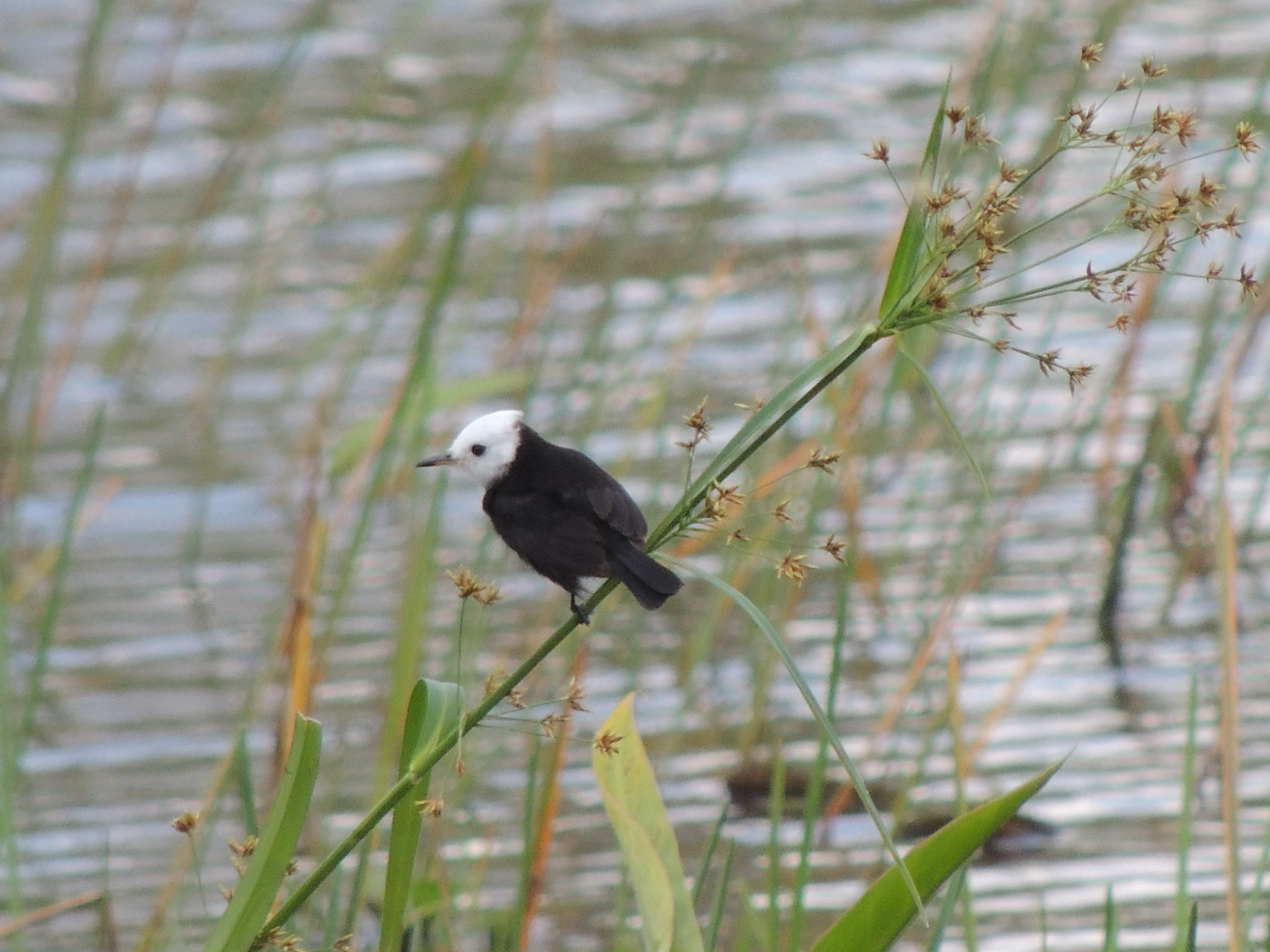
Perching on a small marsh plant.

A. leucocephala captures most of its prey at the water's surface. Its next most commonly used foraging substrate is in the air, followed by live leaves. They tend to perch low on small marsh plants (less than 2 meters high) and attack their prey at a distance of 3 to 4 meters from their initial position. They typically target prey that is at or below their height while perched, and they less frequently attack at a high flight angle. Once they catch their prey, they promptly return to their perch, as they are rarely found on the ground.

Both female and male marsh tyrants participate in feeding their juveniles. The main differences are that the female marsh tyrant hunts at greater distances and makes more frequent visits to the young compared to the male. Moreover, the female is more active in maintaining a sanitary environment for the nestlings. The parents – primarily the female – remove arthropod remains and fecal sacs from the nest, while the juveniles contribute to the cleaning by handing the arthropod remains to their parents. It is theorized that keeping the nest clean helps reduce the risk of infestation by parasites and pathogens.

It is speculated that if the male were to be more active, it could increase the nest's vulnerability to predation and may even increase the risk of predation on the male himself by nearby raptors. This is largely due to the more prominent colors of the male tyrant, which make him more noticeable in his habitat compared to the female.

=== Reproduction ===
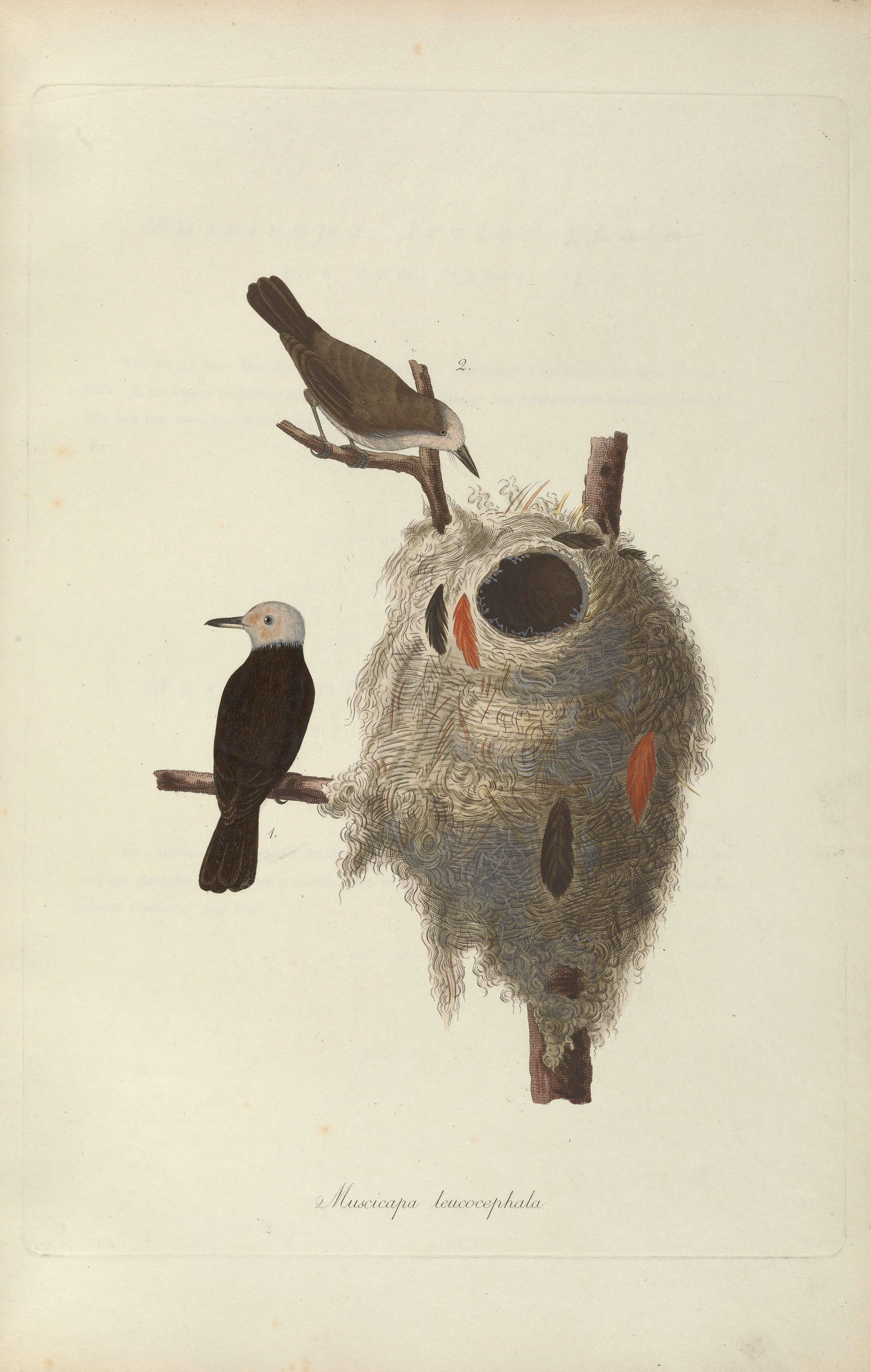
A globular nest.

Nests are typically constructed within four feet of the ground in swamp bushes. They are spherical in shape with a roof and feature a side opening near the top known as the "porch". This opening is narrow, to help protect the nest against predation. The nests are mainly made of dried grass, with the chambers lined thickly with soft materials like down. These homes measure about 4 inches high and 3 inches wide. The tyrants do not attempt to conceal their nests, making them quite noticeable. Both parents participate in their construction.

In Satarem, Brazil, many nests were found within inches of the hive of a large species wasp. Consequently, the natives called the marsh tyrant "Mother of the Wasp".

In order of frequency, the most popular breeding months are September, June, October and August; followed by November and July. The eggs laid are a creamy white color, with the number of eggs in a single brood ranging from 1 to 3. Each egg weighs between 1.8 and 1.9 grams and measures approximately 19.20 to 20.68 millimeters in length and 11.10 to 14.58 millimeters in width. The incubation period lasts about 12 to 16 days and the task is shared by both parents. The hatchlings remain in the nest for about 15–17 days before they are ready to leave. The generation length of the marsh tyrants is around 3.6 years.

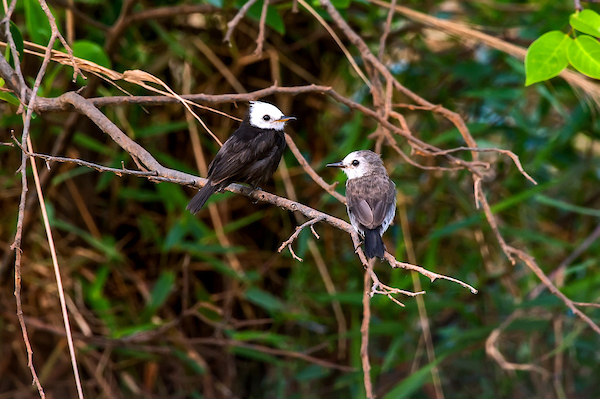
A pair in Serra, Espírito Santo-Southeast of Brazil.

The marsh tyrant is often found in pairs or in a small family group; nevertheless it does sometimes forage alone. The bird exhibits evidence of monogamy, as most individuals spend the majority of their time in couples. However, once one of the partners in the duo disappears, it is replaced by another. To attract the opposite sex, the marsh tyrant performs pre-nuptial flights. During courtship, the crest is prominent and can be bushy or flattened, depending on the moment. Usually, this performance includes an erect crest, high vocalizations, and various wing positions (raised, fanned or fluttering). This behavior is also employed when confronting rivals in aggressive disputes. The tyrant rarely spreads or cocks its tail.

=== Mate aggression ===
A. leucocephala displays mate aggression between breeding pairs, a behavior observed only during the breeding season. In these couples, the males are more aggressive; when they hear the call of a male intruder, they direct their aggression toward their paired female instead of the intruder. When perched, the male opens and flutters its wings while slightly opening its beak. Then, the male aggressively flies over and chases its mate. In response, the female assumes a defensive posture, opening her beak and partially spreading her wings. To evade the male, she may move down the branch or attempt to fly away. This combative conduct can lead to physical harm, increased stress, drained energy, and reduced reproductive success.

== Threats ==
=== Shiny cowbirds (Molthrus bonariensis) ===
The shiny cowbird, found in South America, Panama, and the West Indies, is an obligate brood parasite that targets 176 different bird species as its hosts. In many areas like Guyana and Trinidad, A. leucocephala specifically is known to be a frequent host choice for M. bonariensis. When the brood parasite inhabits wetlands, it tends to prey upon the white-headed marsh tyrant and the Pied water tyrant .

=== Human activity ===
In Brazil's Atlantic Forest, which is home to the marsh tyrant, deforestation poses a significant threat to many plant and animal species. The growing human population endangers wildlife habitats that lack protection from reserves, national parks, or conservation groups. However, even these protected areas are not immune to exploitation, as they are often targeted for their resources (timber, orchids, etc.) as well as for hunting and bird trapping

== Status and conservation ==
This bird is considered fairly common to locally common and is not deemed threatened by the IUCN. Its habitat is located in many national parks and other protected areas which help preserve the environment.

Regions of northeastern Argentina (2%), eastern Paraguay (6%), and eastern Brazil (92%) are part of the Atlantic Forest of South America, which is one of the world's essential biodiversity strongholds. Within this forest, many nature conservation areas are home to the white-headed marsh tyrant, thereby protecting both the bird and its habitat. The following nature reserves house the tyrant: Tapyta Private Nature Reserve, Ypeti Nature Reserve, and Mbaracayú Binational.
