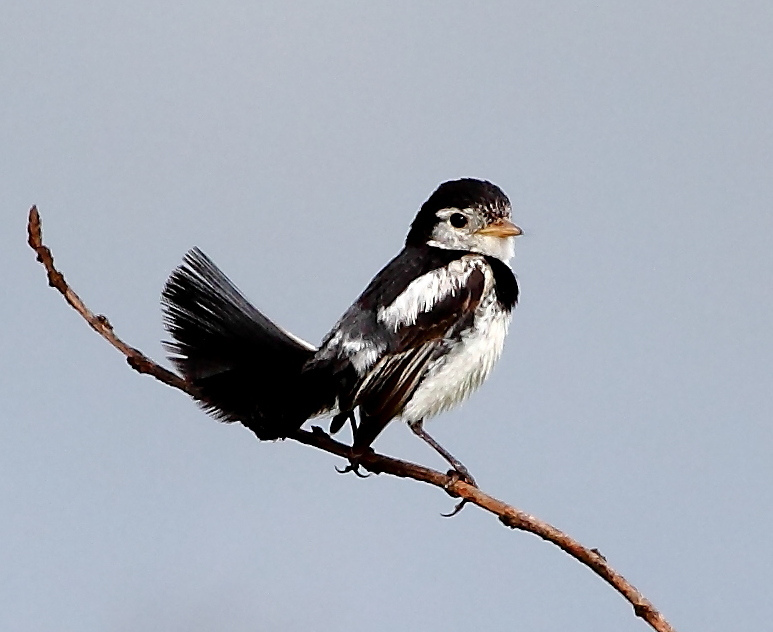

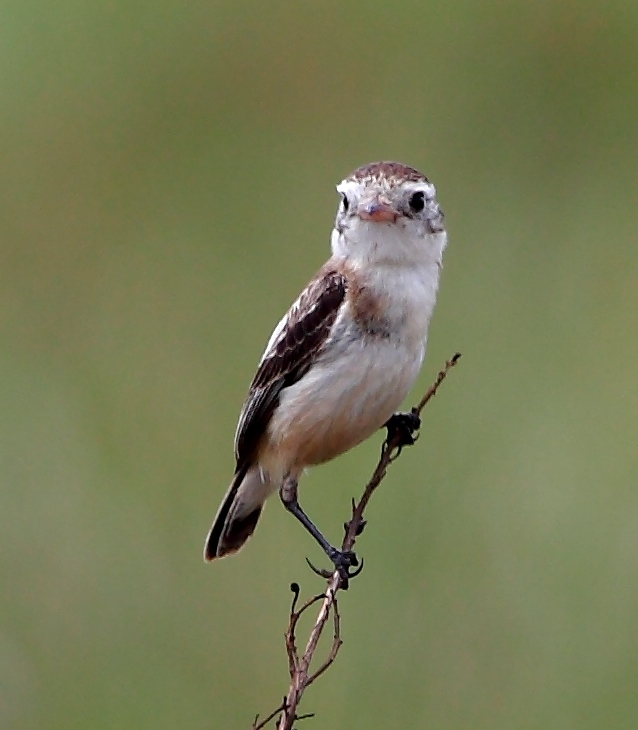
- Male above, female below, both in Serra da Canastra, Brazil

Conservation status
- Vulnerable (IUCN 3.1)

Scientific classification
- Kingdom: Animalia
- Phylum: Chordata
- Class: Aves
- Order: Passeriformes
- Family: Tyrannidae
- Genus: Alectrurus
- Species: A. tricolor

Binomial name
- Alectrurus tricolor (Vieillot, 1816)

= Cock-tailed tyrant =

Species of bird

The cock-tailed tyrant (Alectrurus tricolor) is a Vulnerable species of bird in the family Tyrannidae, the tyrant flycatchers. It is found in Argentina, Bolivia, Brazil, and Paraguay.

== Taxonomy and systematics ==
The cock-tailed tyrant was formally described in 1816 by Louis Pierre Vieillot as Gallita tricolor. Ironically, in the same publication he erected genus Alectrurus, to which the species was later moved.

The cock-tailed tyrant is monotypic. It shares genus Alectrurus with the strange-tailed tyrant (A. risora).

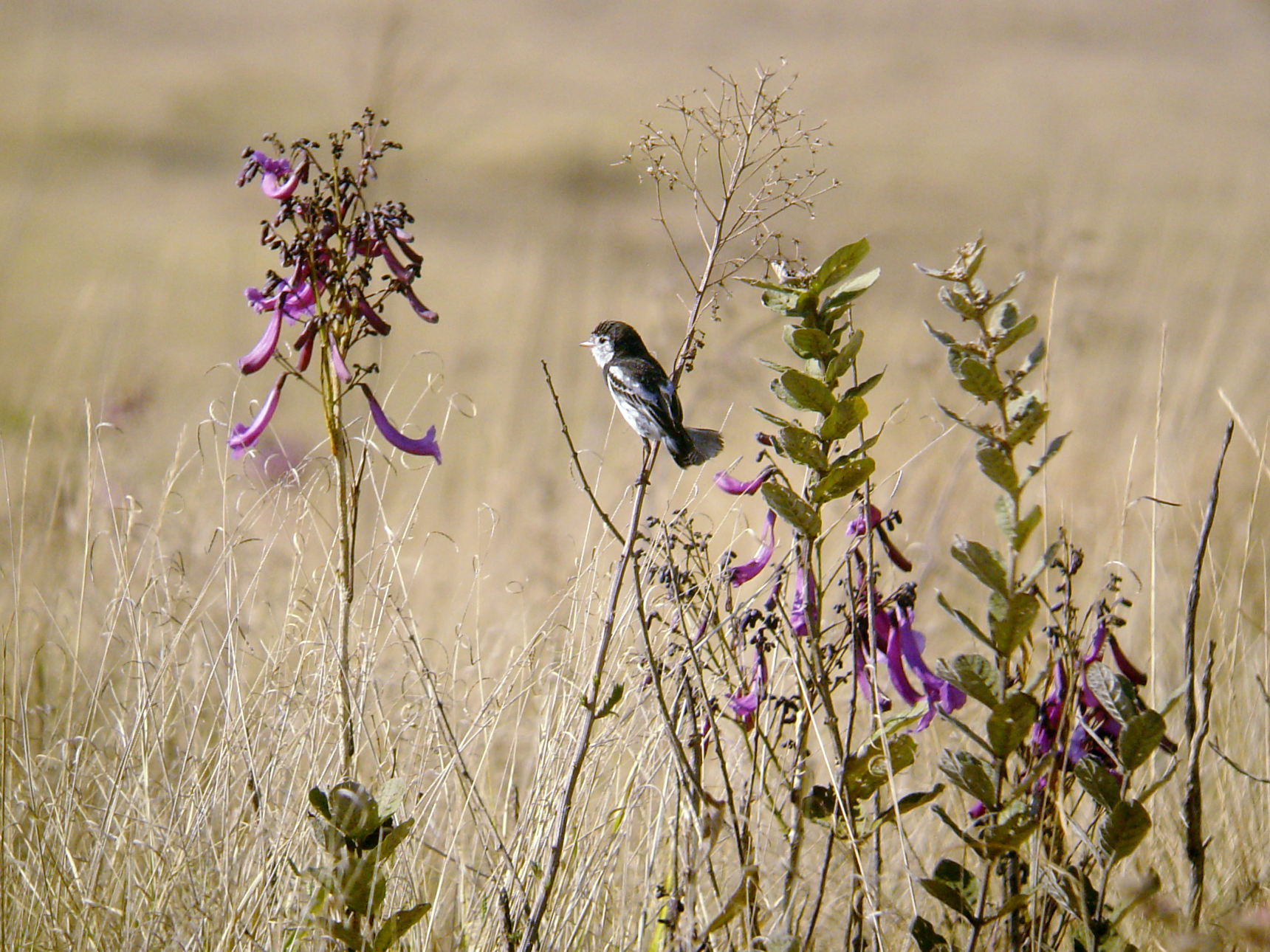
Cock-tailed tyrant, Canastra, Brazil

== Description ==
The cock-tailed tyrant is about 12 cm (4.7 in) long excluding the male's 7 cm (2.8 in) tail streamers. Adult males have a black crown and nape and a white or whitish face. Their back is mostly black with white scapulars and a gray rump. Their wings are black with a white patch on the secondaries. Their tail is black. It is very wide with long stiff central feathers that are twisted to the vertical. The other feathers are compressed against the central ones. Their underparts are mostly white with a black patch on the sides of the chest that connect to the nape. Adult females are mottled brown on the body where males are black. Their wings are a darker brown than the male's. Their tail is dark brown, short, and conventionally shaped. Their throat is white and their underparts whitish with brown in the sides of the chest. Both sexes have a dark brown iris, a yellowish bill with a lighter mandible than maxilla, and gray legs and feet. Juveniles of both sexes are similar to adult females.

== Distribution and habitat ==
The cock-tailed tyrant has a disjunct distribution. One population is found in north-central Bolivia. The other is found from eastern Paraguay into Brazil, where it occurs from southern Mato Grosso east to Minas Gerais and south to Paraná. This range historically extended into northeastern Argentina. The species inhabits open grasslands of several types including campos rupestres, cerrado, and humid savanna. It much prefers areas with tall grass rather than recently burned or heavily grazed ones. It occasionally occurs in shrubby areas near water or grasslands. In elevation it ranges from near sea level to 1,100 m (3,600 ft).

== Behavior ==
=== Movement ===
The cock-tailed tyrant is considered to be a year-round resident, though some seasonal movement has been inferred.

=== Feeding ===
The cock-tailed tyrant feeds on arthropods. It perches conspicuously; it often jerks its tail up and slowly lowers it while flicking its wings. It often occurs in flocks, especially of females. The species takes prey from vegetation while perched or while hovering and also in mid-air by hawking. Its wings make an insect-like buzz while flying or hovering.

=== Breeding ===
The cock-tailed tyrant generally breeds between August and November but the timing can vary based on the beginning of the rainy season. Males make an aerial display in which they fly as high as 100 m (300 ft) with fast fluttery wingbeats and cocking their tail from straight down to high up. The species' nest is a cup made from grass and hidden near or on the ground. Nothing else is known about the species' breeding biology.

=== Vocalization ===
The cock-tailed tyrant is mostly silent but makes soft tic notes during the display flight.

== Status ==
The IUCN originally in 1994 assessed the cock-tailed tyrant as Near Threatened and since 2000 as Vulnerable. It has a large range but occurs in scattered locations throughout it, and has not been recorded in Argentina since 1979. Its estimated population of 2,000 – 8,000 mature individuals is believed to be decreasing. Its grassland habitats are particularly threatened by cattle grazing, destruction for agriculture, and mining operations. It is considered overall uncommon to locally common but is found only in scattered locations. It remains common only in protected areas that have undisturbed grasslands.
