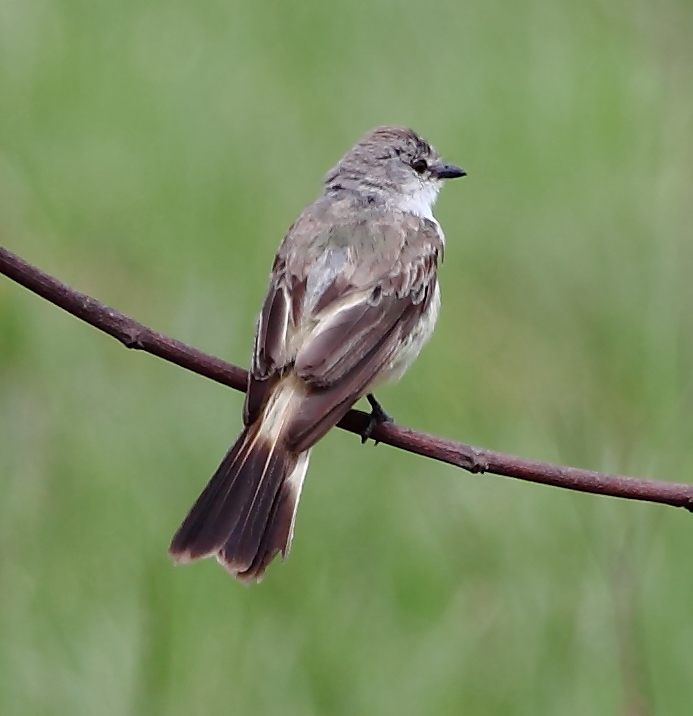
- In Serra da Canastra National Park, Brazil

Conservation status
- Near Threatened (IUCN 3.1)

Scientific classification
- Kingdom: Animalia
- Phylum: Chordata
- Class: Aves
- Order: Passeriformes
- Family: Tyrannidae
- Genus: Guyramemua; Lopes, Chaves, Mendes de Aquino, Silveira & Santos, FR, 2017
- Species: G. affine

Binomial name
- Guyramemua affine (Burmeister, 1856)

Synonyms
- Suiriri islerorum Suiriri affinis

= Chapada flycatcher =

Species of bird

The chapada flycatcher (Guyramemua affine) is a Near Threatened species of bird in subfamily Fluvicolinae of family Tyrannidae, the tyrant flycatchers. It is found in Bolivia and Brazil.

== Taxonomy and systematics ==
The chapada flycatcher has a complicated taxonomic history. It was originally described as Suiriri islerorum in 2001, having been previously thought to be a variant of subspecies S. suiriri affinis of the suiriri flycatcher. Based on a study published in 2014 its binomial was changed to S. affinis. (That change necessitated renaming S. s. affinis to S. s. burmeisteri.) A study published in 2017 found that the chapada flycatcher was not related to the suiriri flycatcher but rather to the members of genus Sublegatus. That relationship was not extremely close so the authors proposed a new genus Guyramemua, and because Guyramemua is neuter the specific epithet had to be changed to affine. Taxonomic systems soon adopted the new binomial.

== Description ==
The chapada flycatcher is about 16 cm (6.3 in) long and weighs 21 to 23 g (0.74 to 0.81 oz). It is a medium-sized flycatcher. The sexes have the same plumage. Adults have a gray crown and nape with a light olive wash. They have a white spot behind the lores and a short white supercilium on an otherwise whitish face. Their upperparts are gray with a light olive wash. Their wings are darker with grayish white tips on the coverts that show as two bars on the closed wing. Their tail is a darker gray than the back with pale outer webs and wide whitish tips on the feathers. Their throat and underparts are whitish and their belly and undertail coverts pure yellow. Both sexes have a brown iris, a black bill, and medium gray legs and feet.

== Distribution and habitat ==
The chapada flycatcher is found in central and southwestern Brazil from Maranhão south and west through Tocantins, Mato Grosso, Goiás, Minas Gerais, and Mato Grosso do Sul into the extreme eastern Santa Cruz Department in Bolivia. It primarily inhabits typical cerrado and also the more specialized campo cerrado and campo sujo within it. All are characterized by shrubby areas with scattered trees within grasslands; the trees are typically 2 to 5 m (7 to 16 ft) tall. In elevation it mostly occurs between 250 and 750 m (800 and 2,500 ft) but possibly is found as high as 1,200 m (3,900 ft).

== Behavior ==
=== Movement ===
The chapada flycatcher is a year-round resident throughout its range.

=== Feeding ===
The chapada flycatcher feeds on arthropods and small fruits. It usually forages from the middle of trees to their crowns and only rarely in shrubs or on the ground. It takes food mostly by gleaning from leaves and branches while perched or briefly hovering, and less often makes sallies to take insects in flight.

=== Breeding ===
The chapada flycatcher's breeding season has not been defined but appears to end in October. Males make a display during which they flick their wings and fan their tail. This display was part of the evidence for its recognition as a species, because the suiriri flycatcher does not display. Nothing else is known about the species's breeding biology.

=== Vocalization ===
The chapada flycatcher's vocalizations are a significant reason for its recognition as a species. They are differert from those of the suiriri flycatcher, and both species ignore the vocalizations of the other. Pairs give different songs during duets. Males make "a loud series of paired couplets, a repeated twangy 'where where, whooz it' " and females "a loud bubbly rattle of variable length and typically preceded by one or two 'whur' notes". Females also make "zhuwheep" or "zhuwheep-oo" contact calls.

== Status ==
The IUCN originally in 2004 assessed the chapada flycatcher as being of Least Concern and from 2009 as Near Threatened. Its population size is not known and is believed to be decreasing. Its population declined 13% for unknown reasons between 2003 and 2007 in a protected area, so "on the basis of apparent rarity in other large protected areas of cerrado, it is precautionarily suspected that these declines are representative for the entire range and that they are continuing at this rate to the present day." As of 2022 "the total population is suspected to have declined by 24% over the past ten years". "The primary threat to cerrado habitat is habitat conversion for Eucalyptus and pine plantations, livestock farming and large-scale cultivation of soybeans, rice and other crops. Repeated annual burning during the dry season may be an additional threat and some areas may be threatened by urbanisation." It is considered rare to locally fairly common and occurs in several protected areas in Brazil.
