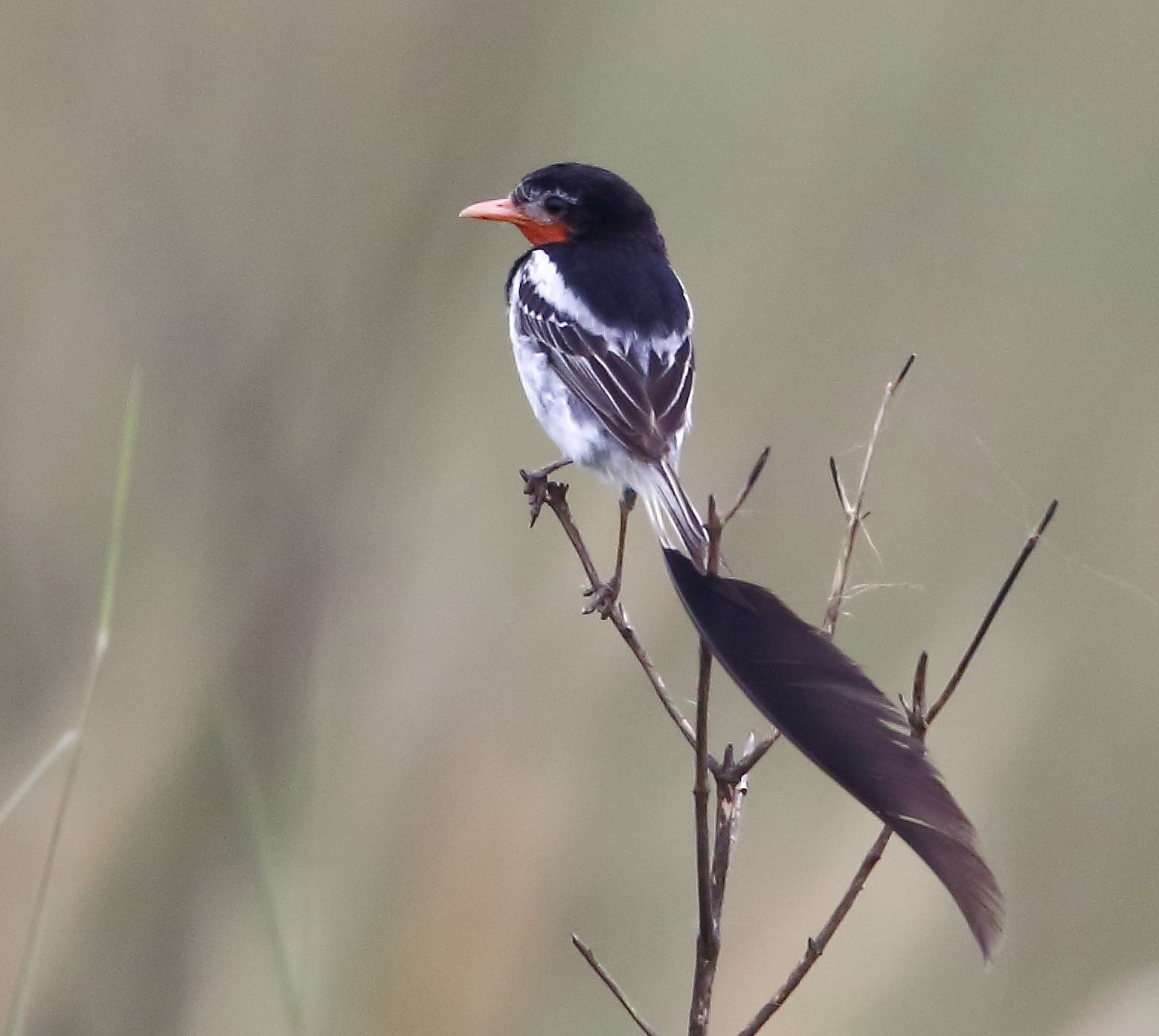
- A male strange-tailed tyrant at Iberá Wetlands, Corrientes Province, Argentina
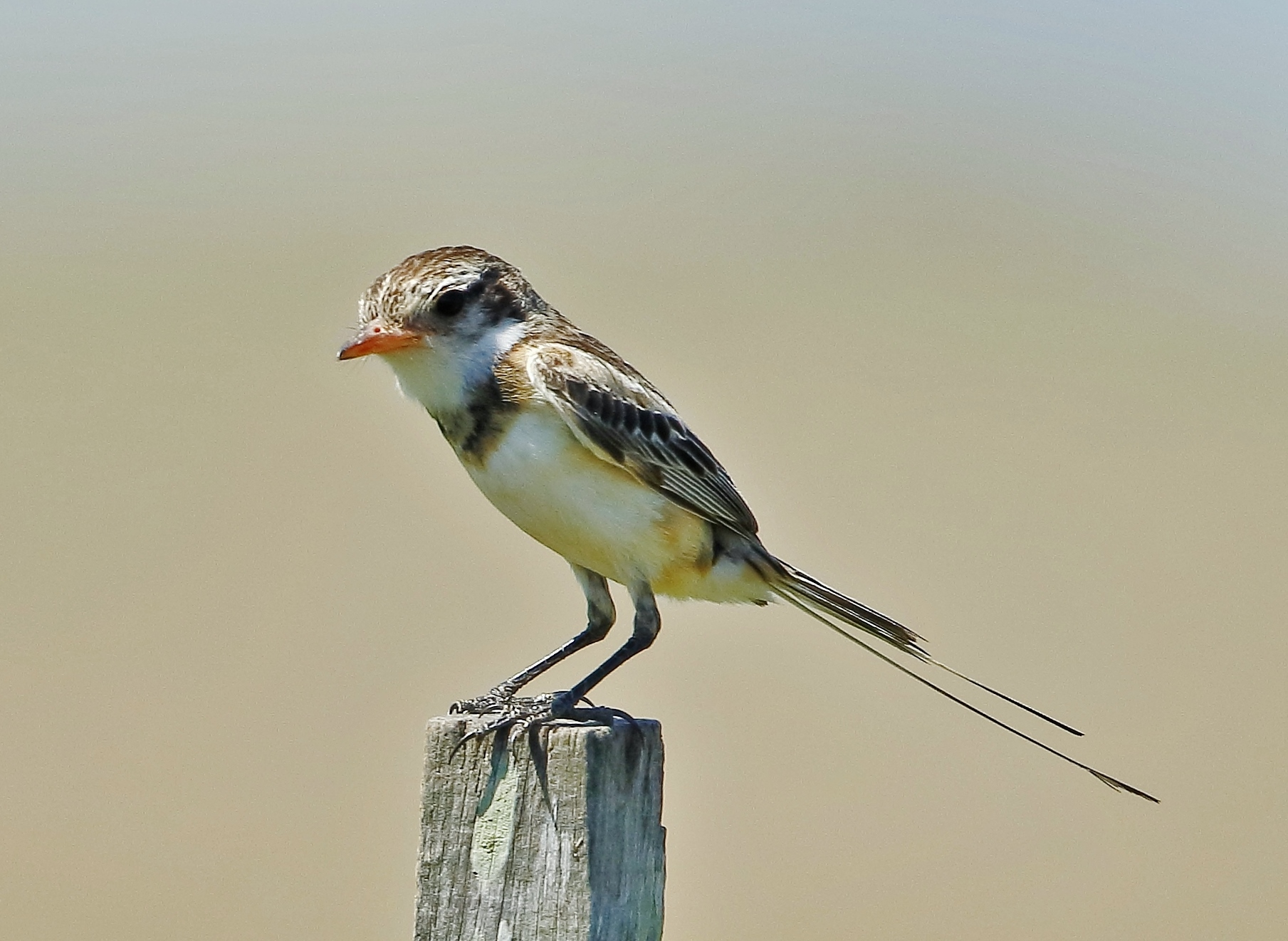
- Female

Conservation status
- Vulnerable (IUCN 3.1)

Scientific classification
- Kingdom: Animalia
- Phylum: Chordata
- Class: Aves
- Order: Passeriformes
- Family: Tyrannidae
- Genus: Alectrurus
- Species: A. risora

Binomial name
- Alectrurus risora (Vieillot, 1824)

Synonyms
- Muscicapa risora (protonym)

= Strange-tailed tyrant =

Species of bird

The strange-tailed tyrant (Alectrurus risora) is a Vulnerable species of bird in the family Tyrannidae, the tyrant flycatchers. It is found in Argentina and Paraguay and as a vagrant in Brazil and Uruguay.

== Taxonomy and systematics ==
The strange-tailed tyrant was formally described in 1824 by Louis Pierre Vieillot as Muscicapa risora, erroneously placing it in the Old World flycatcher family. Ironically, in 1816 he had erected genus Alectrurus, to which the species was later moved. For a time it was placed in the monotypic genus Yetapa.

The strange-tailed tyrant is monotypic. It shares genus Alectrurus with the cock-tailed tyrant (A. tricolor).

== Description ==
The strange-tailed tyrant is about 20 cm (7.9 in) long excluding the male's 10 cm (3.9 in) tail. Adult males in breeding plumage have a mostly black face with white lores and a white supercilium. Their back is mostly black with white scapulars and a gray rump. Their wings are black with white tips on the coverts and white edges on the flight feathers. Their tail is black and very long with a highly modified outer pair of feathers. Those feather shafts are bare at the base and the inner webs of the outer two-thirds are very wide; they are rotated to the vertical plane and held below the rest of the tail. Males have a wide black band across their breast and the rest of their underparts are white. Breeding males have a bare pinkish red or pinkish orange throat. Non-breeding males have a white-feathered throat and usually have a shorter tail. Adult females are mottled brown on the head, upperparts, wings, and tail where males are black. Their tail's outer pair of feathers are long with mostly bare shafts and racquets on the end. Their throat is white and their underparts whitish with a brown band across the breast and often a buff tinge on the rest. Both sexes have a brown iris, a pinkish yellow mandible and pinkish orange maxilla, and dark gray legs and feet; the last have an unusually long hind-claw.

== Distribution and habitat ==
Sources differ on the range of the strange-tailed tyrant. According to the Cornell Lab of Ornithology's Birds of the World, as of 2020 the strange-tailed tyrant is found only from southern Presidente Hayes Department in Paraguay south into northeastern Argentina as far as Corrientes Province. It formerly ranged further south in Argentina to Buenos Aires Province and east into southern Brazil and Uruguay. The last documented record in Brazil was in 1974 and the last in Uruguay was in 1986. BirdLife International's account (BLI) is internally contradictory. Its map agrees with Cornell on the current range, its previous presence further south in Argentina and in Brazil and Uruguay, and the dates of the last documented records in the last two. Some of its text account matches the map. However, elsewhere its text states that the species breeds in all four countries. The South American Classification Committee of the American Ornithological Society classes the species as a vagrant in Brazil and Uruguay. The species primarily inhabits a variety of open landscapes including savanna, marshes, and damp grasslands, where it favors areas of tall grass. It also occurs in shrubby areas. In elevation it occurs up to 500 m (1,600 ft).

== Behavior ==
=== Movement ===
Sources differ on the movements of the strange-tailed tyrant. Cornell states that it is a year-round resident but that it might be a partial migrant in the southern part of its range. BLI's account is again internally contradictory. One part of the text states that the species is a complete migrant, meaning that it totally vacates its breeding range. However, its map shows the species as resident or formerly resident throughout with no breeding-only or non-breeding ranges shown.

=== Feeding ===
The strange-tailed tyrant feeds on insects. It perches conspicuously on tall grass, a shrub, or a fence post and takes prey with sallies in mid-air (hawking) and to grasses. Males whip their tail up and down in flight and sometimes hold the long feathers pointing down. During the non-breeding season it forms flocks; up to 30 individuals have been noted in them.

=== Breeding ===
The strange-tailed tyrant's breeding season has not been fully defined but spans at least September to December. Its nest is a cup made from grass lined with feathers and is hidden near or on the ground. The clutch is two to three white eggs. The incubation period is 16 to 18 days and fledging occurs 12 to 14 days after hatch. The female alone builds the nest, incubates the clutch, and brood and provision nestlings. Males are polygynous with territories that include several females.

=== Vocalization ===
As of May 2025 xeno-canto had three recordings of strange-tailed tyrant vocalizations; the Cornell Lab's Macaulay Library had five others. The only described call is by females when they and young are near each other; it is a "soft and weak whistled thee-uu, schee-uu" whose last note descends.

== Status ==
The IUCN originally in 1994 assessed the strange-tailed tyrant as Threatened and since 1994 as Vulnerable. Its formerly large range has greatly contracted and the species is known locally in fewer than 100 locations within it. Its estimated population of 3,000 to 6,000 mature individuals is believed to be decreasing. "Agricultural conversion and over cattle-grazing of natural grasslands are the principal threats to remaining populations in Argentina" and it is found in only about 10% of its former range in that country. "In Paraguay the main threats are loss of grassland habitats for afforestation with Eucalyptus, cattle ranching and the introduction of invasive grasses, and excessive burning." It is considered rare to locally uncommon or fairly common. It does remain fairly numerous in some national parks and private preserves.
