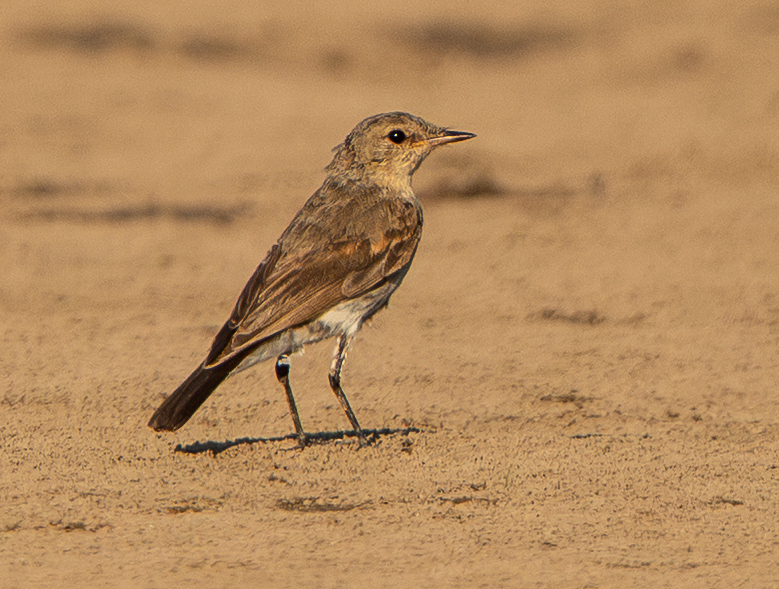

Conservation status
- Least Concern (IUCN 3.1)

Scientific classification
- Kingdom: Animalia
- Phylum: Chordata
- Class: Aves
- Order: Passeriformes
- Family: Tyrannidae
- Genus: Syrtidicola; Chesser et al, 2020
- Species: S. fluviatilis

Binomial name
- Syrtidicola fluviatilis (Sclater, PL & Salvin, 1866)

= Little ground tyrant =

Species of bird

The little ground tyrant (Syrtidicola fluviatilis) is a species of bird in the family Tyrannidae, the tyrant flycatchers. It is found in Bolivia, Brazil, Peru, possibly in Colombia, and as a vagrant in Ecuador.

== Taxonomy and systematics ==
The little ground tyrant was originally described as Muscisaxicola fluviatilis. A genetic study published in 2020 found that it was deeply divergent from other members of Muscisaxicola and was instead sister to the yellow-browed tyrant (Satrapa icterophrys). During 2021 the South American Classification Committee of the American Ornithological Society (SACC), the IOC, and the Clements taxonomy therefore moved the little ground tyrant to the newly erected genus Syrtidicola. However, as of December 2024 BirdLife International's Handbook of the Birds of the World retains the species in genus Muscisaxicola.

The little ground tyrant is the only member of genus Syrtidicola and has no subspecies.

== Description ==
The little ground tyrant is 13 to 14 cm (5.1 to 5.5 in) long. The sexes have the same plumage. Adults have a pale buffy supercilium and line above their lores. The rest of their face and their crown, nape, and back are grayish sandy brown. Their wings are dusky with very thin pale grayish cinnamon edges on the inner remiges and small buffy tips on the coverts that sometimes show as two wing bars. Their tail is black with white outer webs on the outer feathers. Their throat and breast are buffy white and their belly almost white. They have a dark brown iris, a black bill with a pinkish yellow or orange-yellow base to the mandible, and blackish legs and feet.

== Distribution and habitat ==
The little ground tyrant is found in Peru from the Marañón River to the Inambari River and east into Amazonian Brazil to the upper Madeira River region. Its range extends south through eastern Peru and across northern Bolivia well into Brazil's Mato Grosso state. It has occurred as a vagrant in northeastern and far southern Ecuador. It is "at most very local" in eastern Colombia; the SACC has no documented records in that country and calls the species hypothetical there. The little ground tyrant is essentially terrestrial. It primarily inhabits sandbars and river islands with little vegetation and sometimes also occurs in nearby open grassy areas. In elevation it occurs up to 800 m (2,600 ft) in Brazil and 1,500 m (4,900 ft) in Peru. The few records in Ecuador ranged up to 1,150 m (3,800 ft) and in Colombia only to 250 m (800 ft). It possibly has reached as high as 3,800 m (12,500 ft) in Bolivia.

== Behavior ==
=== Movement ===
The little ground tyrant is essentially a year-round resident of the Amazonian lowlands. Some minor movements might occur, though the few high-elevation records (e.g. in Ecuador and Bolivia) might be of vagrants rather than migrants.

=== Feeding ===
The little ground tyrant feeds on insects. It typically forages singly or in pairs, standing and running in the open to search. It sometimes perches a bit higher, such as on a rock, bush, or driftwood, before pouncing on prey. It sometimes associates with migratory shorebirds.

=== Breeding ===
The little ground tyrant breeds between August and October in Peru; its season elsewhere is not known. A typical nest is a cup made of weeds and twigs partially hidden among Tessaria on a large sandy beach. The clutch is two eggs. Nothing else is known about the species' breeding biology.

=== Vocalization ===
As of April 2025 neither xeno-canto nor the Cornell Lab of Ornithology's Macaulay Library had recordings of little ground tyrant vocalizations. The species is usually silent but its call has been written as "a single high-pitched peeeép with rising inflection".

== Status ==
The IUCN has assessed the little ground tyrant as being of Least Concern. It has a large range; its population size is not known and is believed to be stable. No immediate threats have been identified. It is considered uncommon in Peru, "at most very local" in Colombia, and a "casual wanderer" to Ecuador. It occurs in a few protected areas.
