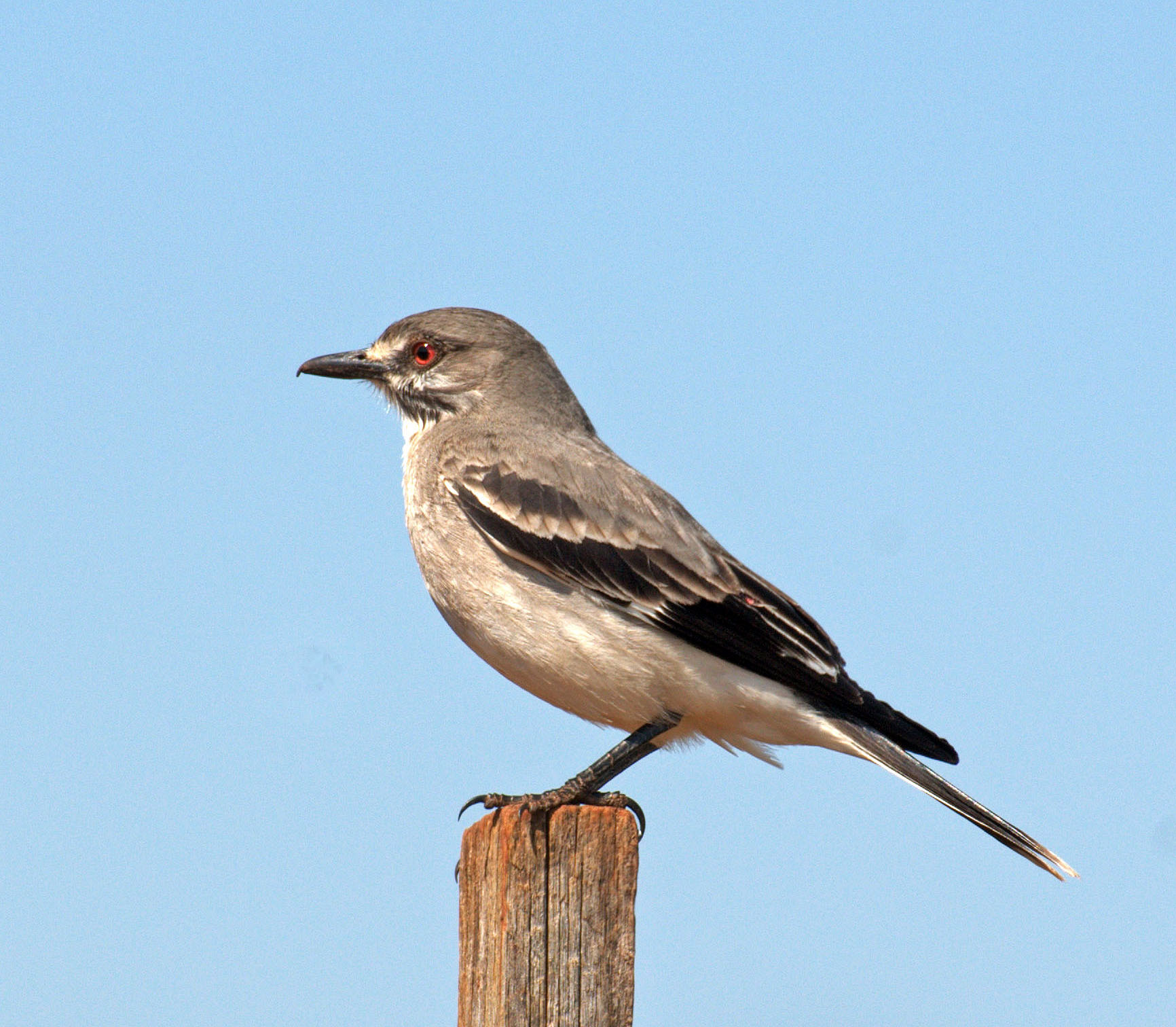
- at Piraju, São Paulo State, Brazil

Conservation status
- Least Concern (IUCN 3.1)

Scientific classification
- Kingdom: Animalia
- Phylum: Chordata
- Class: Aves
- Order: Passeriformes
- Family: Tyrannidae
- Genus: Nengetus; Swainson, 1827
- Species: N. cinereus

Binomial name
- Nengetus cinereus (Vieillot, 1816)

= Grey monjita =

Species bird

The grey monjita (Nengetus cinereus) is a species of bird in the family Tyrannidae, the tyrant flycatchers. It is found in Argentina, Bolivia, Brazil, Paraguay, Peru, Suriname, and Uruguay.

== Taxonomy and systematics ==
The grey monjita has a complicated taxonomic history. It was formally described in 1816 as Tyrannus cinereus. It was later moved to genus Nengetus that had been erected in 1827. Throughout most of the twentieth century it was assigned to genus Xolmis. Studies published in 2018 and 2020 showed that it should be returned to Nengetus and taxonomic systems began moving it there in 2021. However, as of December 2024 BirdLife International's Handbook of the Birds of the World retained the species in Xolmis. Because the reassignment to Nengetus and other reassignments from Xolmis resulted in species of several genera having the English name "monjita", the South American Classification Committee of the American Ornithological Society is seeking a proposal to consider English name changes.

The grey monjita is the only species in genus Nengetus. It has two subspecies, the nominate N. c. cinereus (Vieillot, 1816) and N. c. pepoaza (Vieillot, 1823).

== Description ==
The grey monjita is 21 to 25 cm (8.3 to 9.8 in) long and weighs 50 to 62 g (1.8 to 2.2 oz). The sexes have the same plumage and the two subspecies are essentially alike. Adults have a mouse-gray or dusky grayish crown, a wide white stripe from the lores to above the eye, and a thin white "moustache" with a wider black stripe below it. Their upperparts are mouse-gray or dusky grayish. Their wings are black with wide white bases to the primaries that show in flight. Their wing coverts have white tips and the tertials have white edges. Their tail is black with wide white tips on the feathers. Their throat is white, their breast ashy gray, and their belly white. Juveniles have a brown tinge to the gray. Adults have a bright red iris, a black bill, and black legs and feet.

== Distribution and habitat ==
The nominate subspecies of the grey monjita has a small isolated population in southern Suriname's Sipaliwini Savanna. It main range extends from Amapá in northeastern Brazil south in eastern Brazil to Rio Grande do Sul and beyond through Uruguay and into northeastern Argentina's Misiones Province. Subspecies N. c. pepoaza is found from the Pampas del Heath in extreme southeastern Peru's Madre de Dios Department east and south through northern and eastern Bolivia, southern Mato Grosso do Sul in west-central Brazil, and Paraguay into Argentina as far south as Tucumán and northern Buenos Aires provinces. The species inhabits grassland and cerrado, where it sometimes is found around human structures and settlements. In migration it often is seen in cities. In elevation it ranges from sea level to about 1,200 m (3,900 ft).

== Behavior ==
=== Movement ===
The grey monjita is a year-round resident in most or all of its range. There is some evidence that some of the southernmost move north for the austral winter.

=== Feeding ===
The grey monjita feeds on insects. It perches in the open on fences, wires, and bushes and takes most prey by dropping on it from the perch. Less often it takes it by running on the ground and in mid-air ("hawking").

Adult feeding insects to chicks in a nest built on a ledge on a building in São Carlos, São Paulo, Brazil

=== Breeding ===
The grey monjita's breeding season has not been defined. It includes December in Suriname, January in Brazil, December in Argentina, and October and November in Uruguay. Males make a looping, undulating flight display from and back to a perch. The species' nest is an open cup made from plant stems and straw lined with rootlets, feathers, and hair. It typically is placed on a tree branch but can also be in a hole in a tree and other substrates. The clutch is two to three eggs. Shiny cowbirds (Molothrus bonariensis) are known to parisitize the nest. The incubation period, time to fledging, and details of parental care are not known.

=== Vocalization ===
The grey monjita's song has been described as a "very high, soft weeh-tjuh-teeh" and its call as a "very high, thin weéh". Other descriptions are "pééehpééeh-ili, dew-dlee-ew" and "pééa" respectively.

== Status ==
The IUCN has assessed the grey monjita as being of Least Concern. It has a very large range; its population size is not known and is believed to be decreasing. No immediate threats have been identified. It is common in its limited Suriname range and in much of Brazil; it is less common from southern Brazil and Paraguay further south. It occurs in many protected areas both public and private. "Given its tolerance of converted habitat and its large range, it is not threatened, although rapid destruction of natural grassland and cerrado habitats throughout South America should be of concern."
