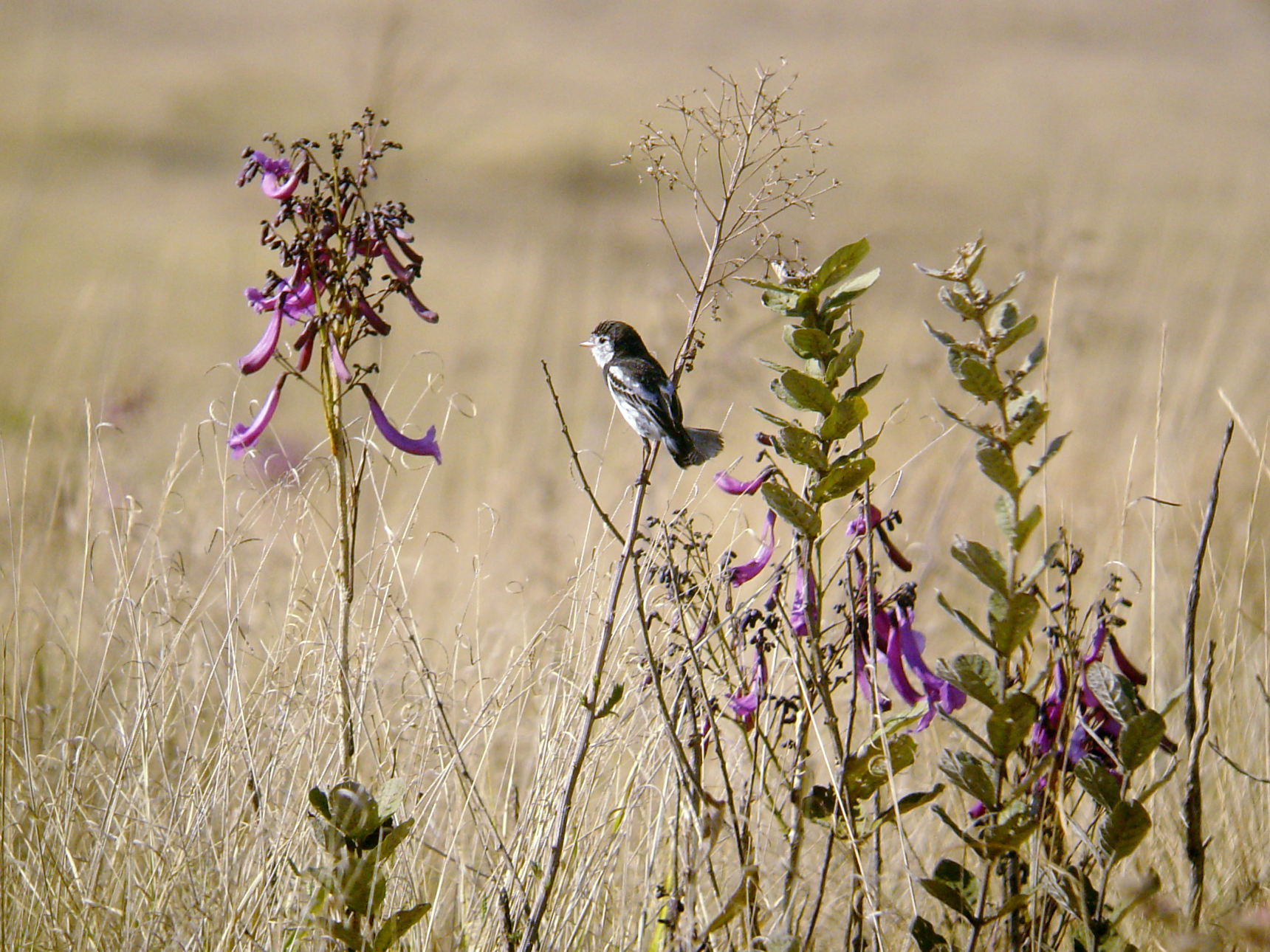
- Cock-tailed tyrant (Alectrurus tricolor), Canastra, Brazil

Scientific classification
- Kingdom: Animalia
- Phylum: Chordata
- Class: Aves
- Order: Passeriformes
- Family: Tyrannidae
- Genus: Alectrurus; Vieillot, 1816

Type species
- Gallita tricolor Vieillot, 1816

Species
- 2, see text

Synonyms
- Alectorurus Gloger, 1842; Alectrura Reichenbach, 1850; Alectrururus Giebel, 1872; Alectura Swainson, 1837; Alecturus Temminck, 1822

= Alectrurus =

Genus of birds

Alectrurus is a genus of South American birds in the tyrant flycatcher family Tyrannidae.

The genus contains the following two species:

Image	Scientific name	Common name	Distribution
	Alectrurus tricolor	Cock-tailed tyrant	Argentina, Bolivia, Brazil, and Paraguay
	Alectrurus risora	Strange-tailed tyrant	Argentina, Paraguay, Uruguay
