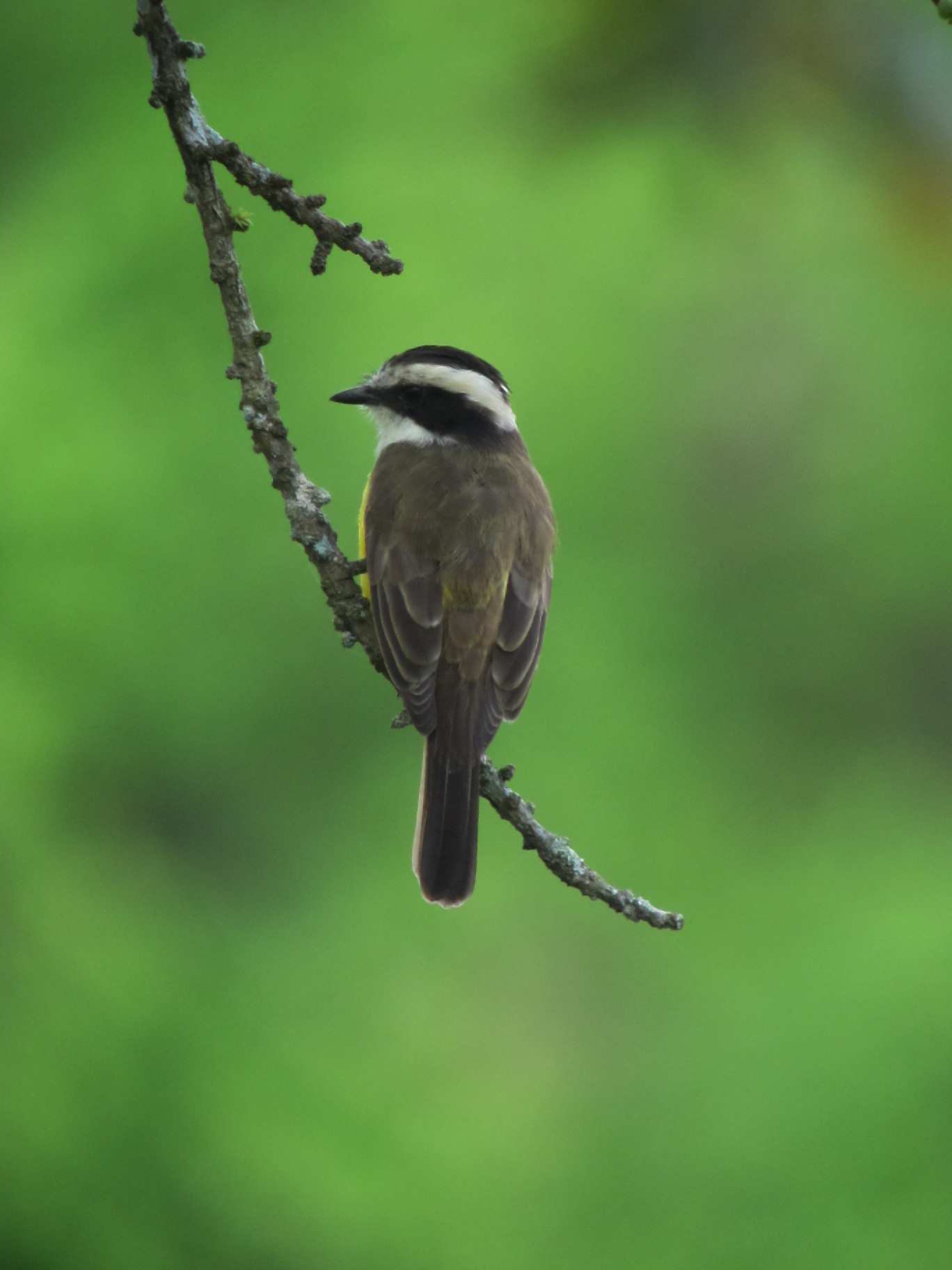

Conservation status
- Least Concern (IUCN 3.1)

Scientific classification
- Kingdom: Animalia
- Phylum: Chordata
- Class: Aves
- Order: Passeriformes
- Family: Tyrannidae
- Genus: Phelpsia; Lanyon, 1984
- Species: P. inornata

Binomial name
- Phelpsia inornata (Lawrence, 1869)

Synonyms
- Myiozetetes inornatus (protonym); Conopias inornatus

= White-bearded flycatcher =

Species of bird

The white-bearded flycatcher (Phelpsia inornata) is a species of bird in the family Tyrannidae, the tyrant flycatchers. It is found in Colombia and Venezuela.

== Taxonomy and systematics ==
The white-bearded flycatcher was originally described in 1869 as Myiozetetes inornatus. During the twentieth century several authors placed it in genus Conopias. A paper published in 1984 erected genus Phelpsia for the species, naming it for William H. Phelps and his family. The specific epithet was changed to inornata to match the gender of the genus.

The white-bearded flycatcher is the only member of genus Phelpsia and has no subspecies.

== Description ==
The white-bearded flycatcher is 16.5 to 18 cm (6.5 to 7.1 in) long and weighs about 29 g (1.0 oz). The sexes have the same plumage. Adults have a brownish black crown and a white supercilium that extends far past the eye on an otherwise brownish black face. Their upperparts are olive-brown. Their wings are olive-brown with thin yellowish edges on the primaries. Their tail is olive-brown. Their throat is white and appears puffy. Their underparts are bright yellow. They have a dark iris, a stubby black bill, and blackish legs and feet.

== Distribution and habitat ==
The white-bearded flycatcher is found from Arauca and Vichada departments in northeastern Colombia northeast across northern Venezuela to Delta Amacuro state. It is a bird of the Llanos, a mostly open landscape of grassland with scattered trees, small woodlands, gallery forest, and ranches. It often is found around ranch buildings. In elevation it reaches about 250 m (800 ft) in Colombia and 450 m (1,500 ft) in Venezuela.

== Behavior ==
=== Movement ===
The white-bearded flycatcher is a year-round resident.

=== Feeding ===
The white-bearded flycatcher feeds mostly on insects and also includes a few small fruits in its diet. It usually forages in pairs and sometimes in small family groups. It usually perches in a somewhat hidden spot and takes much prey with sallies to the ground, tall grass, or other low vegetation. It occasionally takes prey in mid-air by hawking.

=== Breeding ===
The white-bearded flycatcher breeds between March and August. It aggressively defends the nesting site. Its nest is an open cup made from thin twigs, leaf petioles and skeletons, rootlets, and sometimes feathers and hair. It is often bound together with spider web with lichen on the outside. It is typically placed on a branch fork high in a tree. The clutch is two eggs. The incubation period and time to fledging are not known. Most details of parental care are not known, but non-breeding individuals have been recorded helping the nesting pair.

=== Vocalization ===
The white-bearded flycatcher's most common call is "a sharp, rising churup" that as an alarm is given as a series. Pairs give a duet of "a staccato, hammering CHEE'ter, CHEE'ter, CHEE'ter" that each member may give up to 12 times.

== Status ==
The IUCN has assessed the white-bearded flycatcher as being of Least Concern. It has a large range; its population size is not known and is believed to be stable. No immediate threats have been identified. It is considered rare in Colombia and generally fairly common in Venezuela, though very common at Hato Los Indios in Apure. It "[a]ppears to be reasonably adaptable; occurs in agricultural and residential areas".
