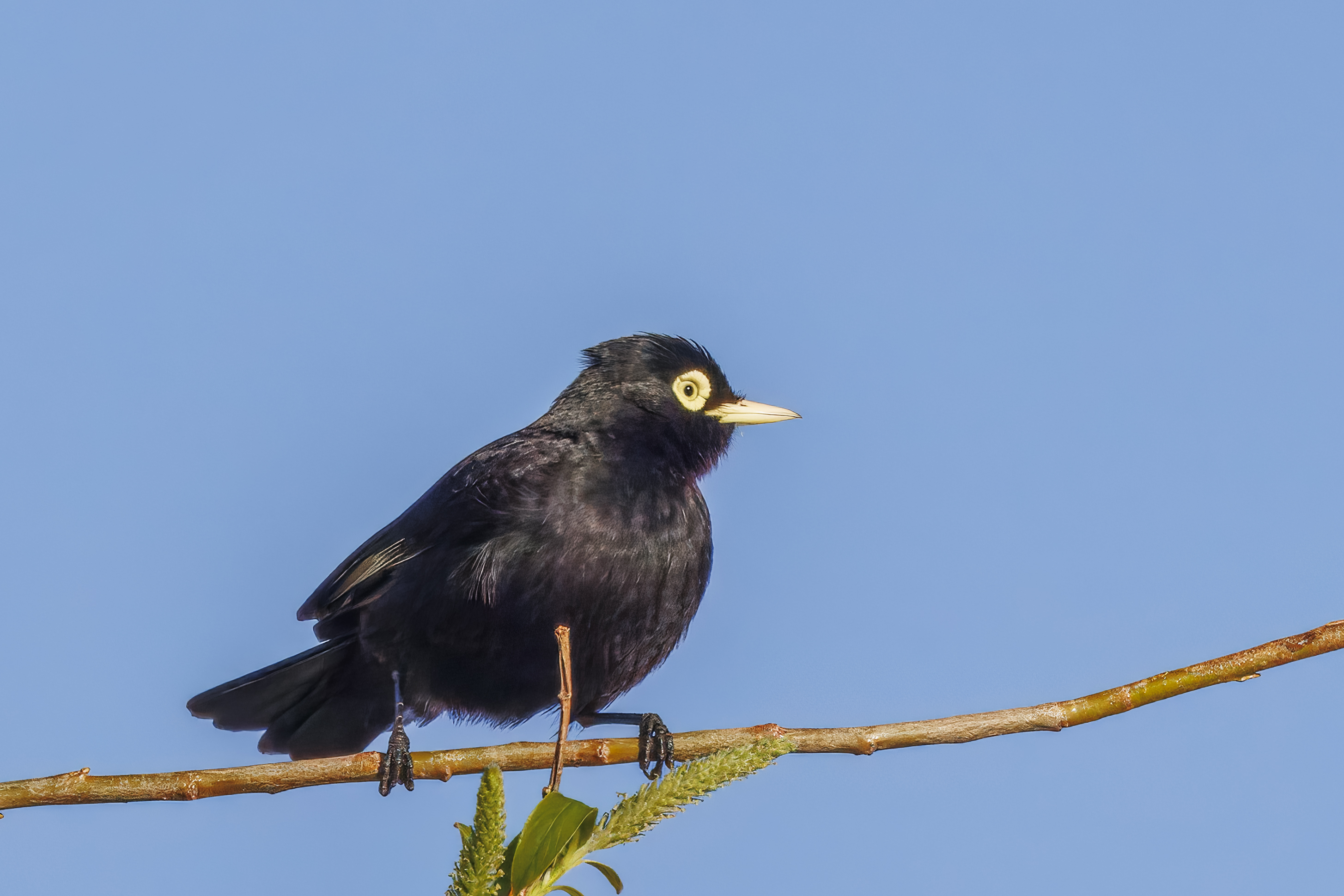
- Male, Argentina
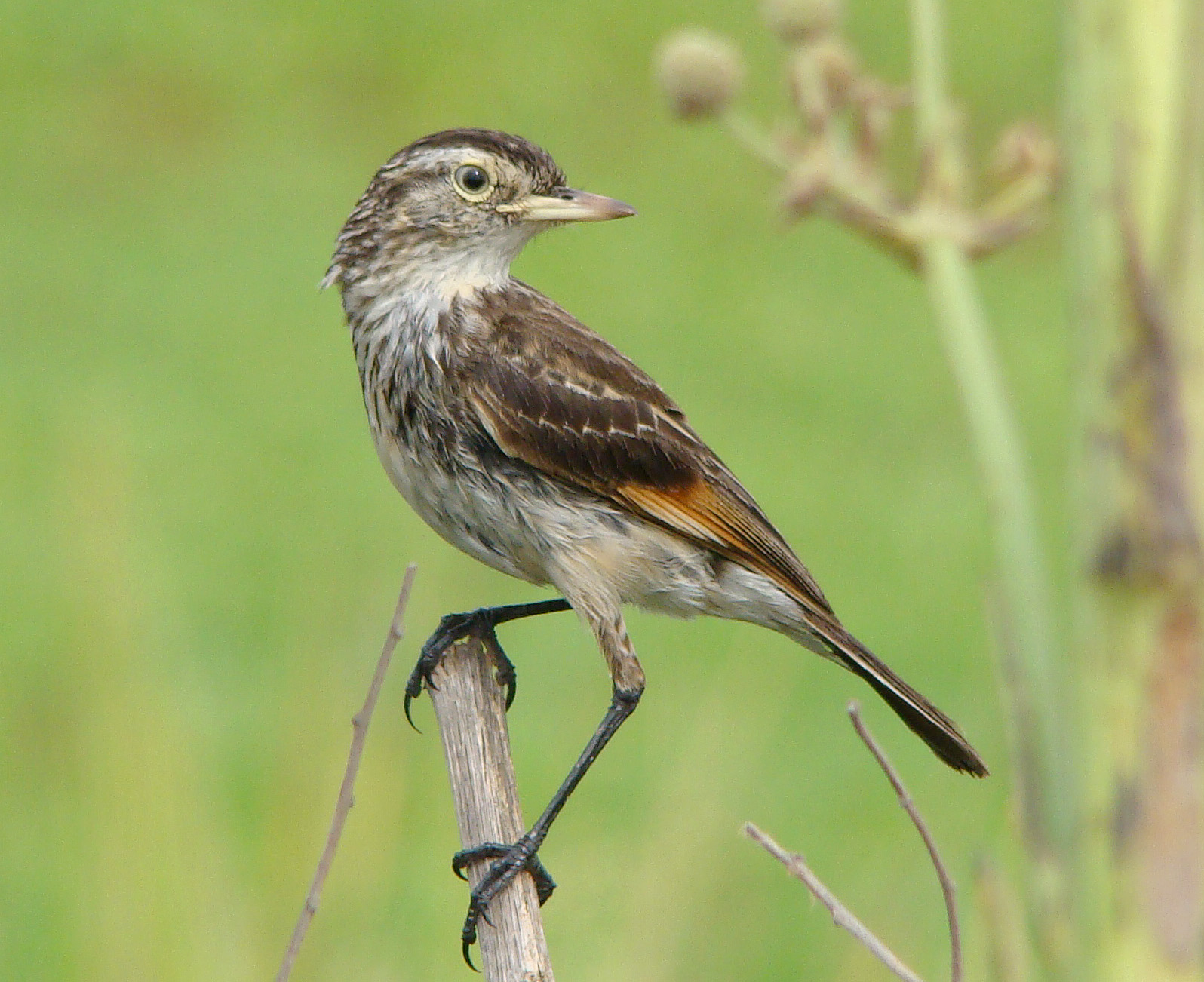
- Female

Conservation status
- Least Concern (IUCN 3.1)

Scientific classification
- Kingdom: Animalia
- Phylum: Chordata
- Class: Aves
- Order: Passeriformes
- Family: Tyrannidae
- Genus: Hymenops; Lesson, 1828
- Species: H. perspicillatus

Binomial name
- Hymenops perspicillatus (Gmelin, JF, 1789)
- Year-round Non-Breeding

= Spectacled tyrant =

Species of bird

The spectacled tyrant (Hymenops perspicillatus) is a species of bird in the family Tyrannidae, the tyrant flycatchers. It is found in Argentina, Bolivia, Brazil, Chile, Paraguay, Uruguay, and as a vagrant to Peru.

== Taxonomy and systematics ==
The spectacled tyrant was formally described in 1789 by the German naturalist Johann Friedrich Gmelin in his revised and expanded edition of Carl Linnaeus's Systema Naturae. He placed it with the wagtails in the genus Motacilla and coined the binomial name Motacilla perspicillata. Gmelin based his description on "Le clignot ou traquet à lunette" that had been described in 1778 by the French polymath the Comte de Buffon in his Histoire Naturelle des Oiseaux. The spectacled tyrant is now the only species in genus Hymenops that was introduced in 1828 by the French naturalist René Lesson. The genus name is from Ancient Greek humēn meaning "skin" or "membrane" and ōps meaning "eye". The specific epithet perspicillatus is Modern Latin meaning "spectacled". Within the family Tyrannidae the spectacled tyrant is sister to the genus Knipolegus containing the black tyrants.

The spectacled tyrant has two subspecies, the nominate H. p. perspicillatus (Gmelin, JF, 1789) and H. p. andinus (Ridgway, 1879).

== Description ==
The spectacled tyrant is 13 to 16 cm (5.1 to 6.3 in) long and weighs about 20 to 25 g (0.71 to 0.88 oz). Adult males of the nominate subspecies are mostly black. Their primaries are mostly white with black bases and tips. They have bare, fleshy, green-tinged yellow skin around the eye that gives the species its English name. Adult females have a dark brown crown, a buffy or buff-white supercilium, pale lores, and a smaller eye-ring than males on otherwise mostly pale dusky face. Their back is dark brown with black streaks. Their wings have rufous flight feathers and buffy edges on the coverts that show as two wing bars. Their tail is dark. Their underparts are pale dusky to whitish with dusky streaks on the breast. Subspecies H. p. andinus is slightly larger than the nominate. Adult males have less white on their wings than the nominate and adult females have less bold streaking in their breast. Juveniles of both subspecies are similar to their respective adult females. Both sexes of both subspecies have a yellow iris and black legs and feet. Males have a pale yellow bill and females a dusky maxilla and brown mandible.

== Distribution and habitat ==
The spectacled tyrant has a disjunct distribution. The nominate subspecies is found in coastal southeastern and far southern Brazil and in Bolivia, Paraguay, Uruguay, and Argentina as far south as Río Negro Province. Subspecies H. p. andinus is found in Chile from the Atacama Region south to the Los Lagos Region and separately in Argentina south to northern Santa Cruz Province. It has occurred as a vagrant in Peru and far northeastern Brazil.

The spectacled tyrant is a bird of open landscapes such as marshes, grasslands, and pastures, the last two often but not exclusively near water. In Brazil it is found from sea level to 2,000 m (6,600 ft).

== Behavior ==
=== Movement ===
The spectacled tyrant is a partial migrant. Most of the population in Chile crosses the Andes to Argentina. Most of the population in southern Argentina moves north for the austral winter. In both populations small numbers of males remain year-round in the breeding areas. It occurs in coastal southeastern Brazil and Bolivia only in the winter. A small number breed in Paraguay but most records there are of winter migrants from the south.

=== Feeding ===
The spectacled tyrant feeds on insects and other arthropods. It usually forages singly, chasing prey on the ground or sallying to it from a fence post or a bush or reed.

=== Breeding ===
The spectacled tyrant is thought to be polygynous, as male's territories often include more than one female. Males vigorously defend their territories from intrusion by other males and other species. In defense and courtship they make a display flight from a perch up to about 10 m (35 ft); at the top it snaps its bill and then drops straight down. The species breeds between October and January in Argentina and between November and January in Chile. The species' nest is an open cup placed on the ground among grass tussocks; it is made mostly from grasses with often feathers or cow hair incorporated. The clutch is two to three eggs that are white and usually have brown or reddish spots. The incubation period is 15 to 17 days and fledging occurs 14 to 16 days after hatch. Females alone build the nest, incubate the clutch, and brood and provision nestlings.

=== Vocal and non-vocal sounds ===
The spectacled tyrant is not highly vocal. During the descent phase of the flight display males make a shrill "zheeeee" and their wings produce a buzz. Males also make "a series of thin, squeaky notes".

== Status ==
The IUCN has assessed the spectacled tyrant as being of Least Concern. It has a very large range; its population size is not known and is believed to be stable. No immediate threats have been identified. It is considered fairly common to common and is found in several national parks and other protected areas. "Because the Spectacled Tyrant has an affinity for tall grasses, the species has declined in abundance and even disappeared in vast areas of the Pampas region of Argentina, following replacement of native tall grasslands by croplands and pasturelands."
