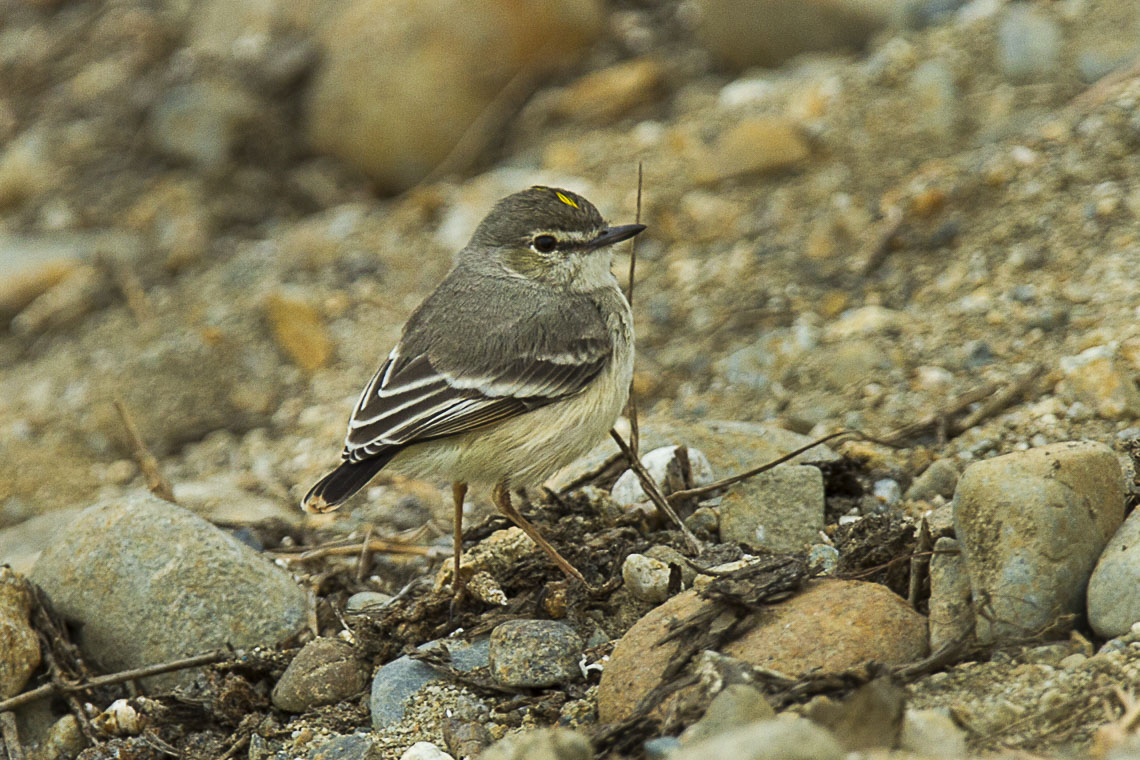

Conservation status
- Least Concern (IUCN 3.1)

Scientific classification
- Kingdom: Animalia
- Phylum: Chordata
- Class: Aves
- Order: Passeriformes
- Family: Tyrannidae
- Genus: Muscigralla d'Orbigny & Lafresnaye, 1837
- Species: M. brevicauda

Binomial name
- Muscigralla brevicauda d'Orbigny & Lafresnaye, 1837

= Short-tailed field tyrant =

Species of bird

The short-tailed field tyrant (Muscigralla brevicauda) is a species of bird in the family Tyrannidae, the tyrant flycatchers. It is found in Ecuador, Peru, and as a vagrant to Chile and Colombia.

== Taxonomy and systematics ==
The short-tailed field tyrant was originally described in 1837 as the type specimen for genus Muscigralla. Since its description, some authors have questioned the status of that genus. Some merged it into Muscisaxicola. However, early twenty-first century studies confirmed genus Muscigralla and found that it is not closely related to Muscisaxicola. Some questions remain about its exact affinities.

The short-tailed field tyrant is the only member of its genus and has no subspecies.

== Description ==
The short-tailed field tyrant is 11 to 12 cm (4.3 to 4.7 in) long; two individuals weighed 13.5 and 11.8 g (0.48 and 0.42 oz). It has very long legs and a very short tail. The sexes have the same plumage. Adults have a brownish gray head with a short white patch above the lores and a mostly hidden yellow patch in the center of the crown. Their upperparts are mostly brownish gray with a buffy upper rump and rufous chestnut lower rump and uppertail coverts. Their wings are mostly dusky with thin whitish edges on the flight feathers and whitish tips on the coverts; the latter show as two pale wing bars. Their tail is dusky with thin buff tips on the feathers. Their throat, breast, and belly are whitish and their flanks buffy. They have a dark brown or pale rufous iris, a bill that can be entirely black or have a brown maxilla and a dusky-tipped pale yellow mandible, and pale yellowish to pinkish legs and feet.

== Distribution and habitat ==
The short-tailed field tyrant is found from Santa Elena and Guayas provinces in west-central Ecuador south for the entire length of Peru. It also occurs separately in northern Peru's Marañón River valley. There are isolated records further north in Ecuador, one record in Colombia, and a few records in far northern Chile. The species primarily inhabits a variety of open landscapes including arid scrublands, agricultural areas, and pastures. There are some records in woodlands. In elevation it ranges from sea level to 1,500 m (4,900 ft) in Ecuador and to 1,200 m (3,900 ft) in Peru.

== Behavior ==
=== Movement ===
The short-tailed field tyrant is a year-round resident.

=== Feeding ===
The short-tailed field tyrant feeds on insects, though details are lacking. It typically forages singly or in pairs, and almost entirely on the ground. It stands and walks upright, flicking its wings and tail. It takes prey from the ground or with leaps or short flutters to catch it in mid-air.

=== Breeding ===
The short-tailed field tyrant breeds between February and June in Ecuador; its season in Peru is not known. Its nest is an open or partially domed cup made from coarse grass lined with finer grass. It is placed on the ground, usually in a grass clump or under a shrub, though sometimes in the open. The clutch is three to five unmarked white eggs. The incubation period is about 14 days and fledging occurs 13 to 14 days after hatch. Details of parental care are not known. There is one report of a nest having been parasitized by a shiny cowbird (Molothrus bonariensis).

=== Vocalization ===
One description of the short-tailed field tyrant's song is "a weak, sibilant tizztízzz, sometimes preceded by a few tik notes". Another is "a series of dry, metallic tik or spit notes followed by a buzzy, rising-falling trill: tik tik tik tzzZZZZzzew". Its calls include "a metallic, dry spit! and, when flushed, a sputtering trilled series of spit and trr notes". The species sings from a low perch or during a flight display that may take it 20 m (70 ft) into the air.

== Status ==
The IUCN has assessed the short-tailed field tyrant as being of Least Concern. It has a large range; its population size is not known and is believed to be stable. No immediate threats have been identified. It is considered fairly common in both Ecuador and Peru. "Human activities probably have little short term effect on [the] Short-tailed Field Tyrant; this species occupies many agricultural areas."
