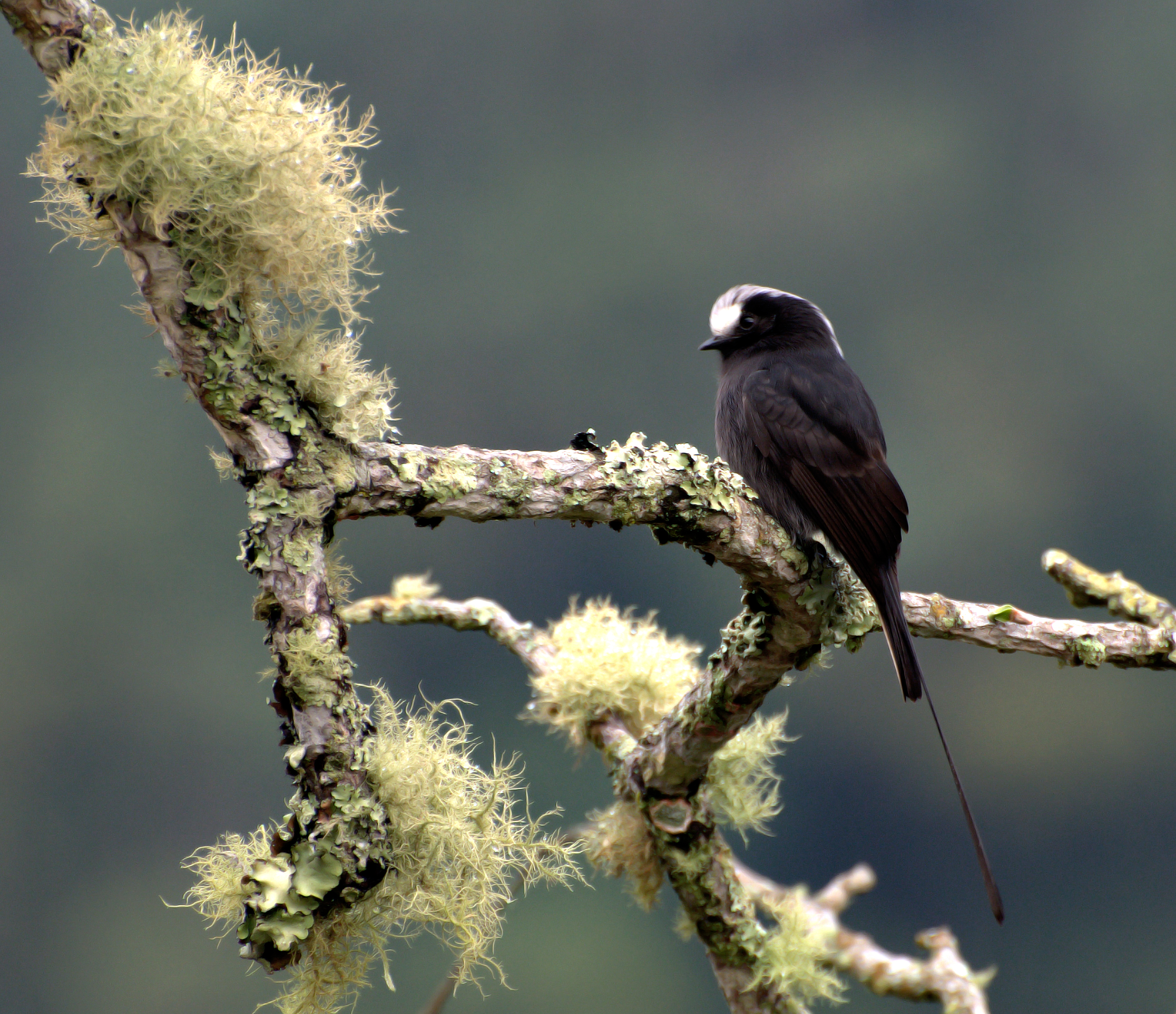
- In Parque Nacional do Itatiaia, Rio de Janeiro, Brazil

Conservation status
- Least Concern (IUCN 3.1)

Scientific classification
- Kingdom: Animalia
- Phylum: Chordata
- Class: Aves
- Order: Passeriformes
- Family: Tyrannidae
- Genus: Colonia; J.E. Gray, 1828
- Species: C. colonus

Binomial name
- Colonia colonus (Vieillot, 1818)

= Long-tailed tyrant =

Species of bird

The long-tailed tyrant (Colonia colonus) is a species of bird in the family Tyrannidae, the tyrant flycatchers. It is found in Central America from Honduras to Panama and in every mainland South American country except Chile and Uruguay.

== Taxonomy and systematics ==
The long-tailed tyrant was originally described as Muscicapa colonus, erroneously including it in the Old World flycatcher family.

The long-tailed tyrant is the only member of genus Colonia. It has these five subspecies:

- C. c. leuconota (Lafresnaye, 1842)
- C. c. fuscicapillus (Sclater, PL, 1862)
- C. c. poecilonota (Cabanis, 1849)
- C. c. niveiceps Zimmer, JT, 1930
- C. c. colonus (Vieillot, 1818)

== Description ==
Male long-tailed tyrants are 23 to 28 cm (9.1 to 11 in) and females 18 to 22 cm (7.1 to 8.7 in) long; these measurements do not include the elongated central tail feathers. Adults weigh 15 to 18 g (0.53 to 0.63 oz). Adult males of the nominate subspecies C. c. colonus are mostly dull black with a white forehead and forecrown, a whitish rump, and a grayish black belly. Their central pair of tail feathers can extend up to 13 cm (5.1 in) beyond the others and have somewhat widened tips. They are often worn or broken. Adult females are paler and grayer than males, with a darker crown, grayer rump, and shorter tail streamers; their belly is mottled with white. Juveniles are a paler sooty gray than adults with a faint whitish stripe around the crown, a pale gray belly, and central tail feathers that project only slightly beyond the others.

The other subspecies of the long-tailed tyrant differ from the nominate and each other thus:

- C. c. leuconota: sootier gray overall than nominate with a darker crown, smaller bill, and a grayish white stripe down the middle of the back
- C. c. fuscicapillus: darker back than nominate with a pure white rump
- C. c. poecilonota: largest subspecies; blacker than nominate with black-streaked ashy gray crown, a white stripe down the middle of the back, and a heavier bill
- C. c. niveiceps: like the nominate but for a silvery gray crown

All subspecies have a dark iris, a short, wide, black bill, and black legs and feet.

== Distribution and habitat ==
The long-tailed tyrant has a disjunct distribution. The subspecies are found thus:

- C. c. leuconota: Caribbean slope from Olancho and Gracias a Dios departments in northeastern Honduras south through Nicaragua and Costa Rica, through Panama on the Caribbean and Pacific slopes, east into north-central Colombia, and south through western Colombia into Ecuador as far as northern Guayas and Los Ríos provinces
- C. c. fuscicapillus: from Colombia's Cundinamarca Department south along the Eastern Andes and the eastern slope of the Ecuadorean Andes into far northeastern Peru's Amazonas and Loreto departments
- C. c. poecilonota: Venezuela on Cerro de la Neblina in far southern Amazonas state and from Venezuela's central Bolívar state east through the Guianas
- C. c. niveiceps: from southern Zamora-Chinchipe Province in southeastern Ecuador south and east through eastern Peru into northern Bolivia as far as Cochabamba Department
- C. c. colonus: central and eastern Brazil south of the central Amazon Basin south to southern Mato Grosso do Sul and northern Rio Grande do Sul, eastern Paraguay, and into northeastern Argentina's Misiones Province

The long-tailed tyrant inhabits a variety of semi-open landscapes in the tropical and lower subtropical zones. These include the edges of humid evergreen forest and woodland, gallery forest, early successional forest, plantations with standing snags, and natural and human-made gaps in the forest interior. In elevation it ranges from sea level to 900 m (3,000 ft) in Central America and is mostly below 1,200 m (3,900 ft) in South America. It reaches 600 m (2,000 ft) in Honduras and Costa Rica, 1,300 m (4,300 ft) in Colombia, 350 m (1,100 ft) and possibly higher in Venezuela, 1,100 m (3,600 ft) in Ecuador, 2,300 m (7,500 ft) in Peru, and is mostly below 1,200 m (3,900 ft) in Brazil.

== Behavior ==
=== Movement ===
The long-tailed tyrant is a year-round resident in almost its entire range; it is thought to move north from the extreme southern end of it for the austral winter.

=== Feeding ===
The long-tailed tyrant feeds on insects, and in some areas such as Costa Rica specializes in stingless bees. It primarily forages in pairs and sometimes small family groups and does not join mixed-species feeding flocks. It perches in the open, high on a snag or open branches, and flicks its tail streamers up and down. The perch is often in the same tree as its nest. It takes most prey in mid-air by hawking from the perch and often returns to the same perch after capture.

=== Breeding ===
The long-tailed tyrant's breeding season has not been defined in most areas. It spans March to July in Central America, Colombia, and Venezuela. In Argentina it apparently includes October to January. Pairs defend a territory around the nest/feeding tree, especially against intrusion by other cavity-nesting species. The nest is a mat of leaf rachises in the bottom of a cavity which might be an old woodpecker hole or a rotted knothole in a dead tree, and is anywhere from 8 to 30 m (25 to 100 ft) above the ground. The clutch is two to three eggs. The incubation period, time to fledging, and details of parental care are not known.

=== Vocalization ===
The long-tailed tyrant's a soft, rising, call variously written as "sweeE", "wheet", "sweee?", "weee?", and "weé-uw". Males sing "a longer twee-la, twee-la, twee-la", a "musical, humming druu" while whipping the tail, and a "sharp, sibilant chip in interactions".

== Status ==
The IUCN has assessed the long-tailed tyrant as being of Least Concern. It has an extremely large range and its estimated population of at least five million mature individuals is believed to be stable. No immediate threats have been identified. It is considered fairly common in Honduras and Costa Rica, "locally common" in Colombia, "common but somewhat local" in Venezuela, "fairly common and conspicuous" in Ecuador, and the "characteristic flycatcher" of Peru. It is "tolerant of converted habitats, and occurs in many national parks and other protected areas throughout its large range".
