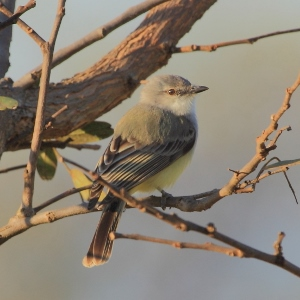
- At Boa Esperança do Sul, São Paulo State, Brazil

Conservation status
- Least Concern (IUCN 3.1)

Scientific classification
- Kingdom: Animalia
- Phylum: Chordata
- Class: Aves
- Order: Passeriformes
- Family: Tyrannidae
- Genus: Suiriri d'Orbigny, 1840
- Species: S. suiriri

Binomial name
- Suiriri suiriri (Vieillot, 1818)

= Suiriri flycatcher =

Species of bird

The suiriri flycatcher (Suiriri suiriri) is a species of bird in subfamily Elaeniinae of family Tyrannidae, the tyrant flycatchers. It is found in Argentina, Bolivia, Brazil, Paraguay, Suriname, and Uruguay.

== Taxonomy and systematics ==
The suiriri flycatcher was described by the French ornithologist Louis Pierre Vieillot in 1818 under the binomial name Muscicapa suiriri. The type locality is Puerto Pinasco in Paraguay.

The suiriri flycatcher is the only member of its genus. It has three subspecies, the nominate S. s. suiriri (Vieillot, 1818), S. s. burmeisteri (Kirwan, Steinheimer, Raposo & Zimmer, KJ, 2014), and S. s. bahiae (von Berlepsch, 1893).

Into the early twenty-first century the suiriri flycatcher had a complicated taxonomic history. What is now the chapada flycatcher (Guyramemua affine) is a cryptic species that was unrecognized within subspecies S. s. affinis of the suiriri flycatcher until it was described in 2001 as Suiriri islerorum. Based on a study published in 2014 the chapada flycatcher's binomial was changed to S. affinis. That change necessitated renaming S. s. affinis to S. s. burmeisteri.

Some taxonomic systems had split the suiriri flycatcher into two species, the southern "Chaco suiriri" (S. suiriri) with a white belly and the northern "Campo suiriri" (S. affinis) with a yellow belly and a contrastingly pale rump. The two interbreed widely where they come into contact, and consequently most authorities now consider them to be part of a single species. It has also been suggested that the taxon bahiae, which is considered a subspecies of S. affinis when that species is split from S. suiriri, actually is the result of hybridization between suiriri and affinis. For the most part it resembles the latter, but it lacks a contrastingly pale rump as the former.

The name suiriri originates from Guaraní language, where it is a generic name used for several medium-sized tyrant flycatchers.

== Description ==
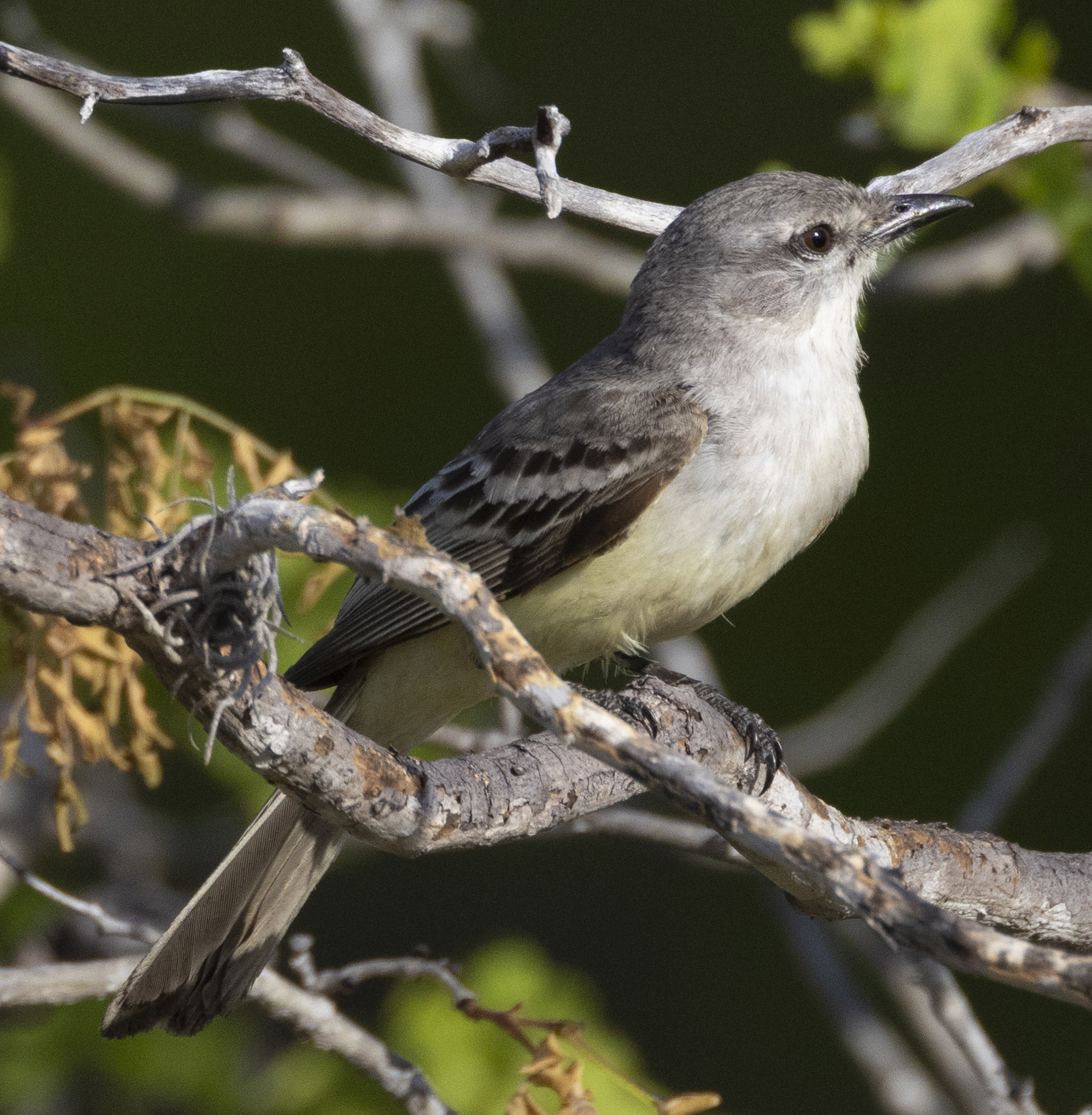
NE Brazil

The suiriri flycatcher is 15 to 16 cm (5.9 to 6.3 in) long. The nominate subspecies weighs 11.5 to 16 g (0.41 to 0.56 oz) and subspecies S. s. burmeisteri 18.5 to 21 g (0.65 to 0.74 oz). It is a medium-sized flycatcher. The sexes have the same plumage. Adults of the nominate subspecies have a gray crown and nape. They have a white spot behind the lores and a short white supercilium on an otherwise whitish face. Their upperparts are gray. Their wings are a darker gray with paler outer edges and tips on the flight feathers. Their wing coverts have grayish white tips that show as two bars on the closed wing. Their tail is a darker gray than the back. Their throat and underparts are whitish, with the breast slightly darker than the rest. Subspecies S. s. burmeisteri is larger than the nominate with more olive on its back, a buffy-yellowish rump, more yellowish wing markings, and a white throat, pale gray breast, and pale yellow belly and crissum. S. s. bahiae is mostly like burmeisteri but with a brownish rump. Both sexes of all subspecies have a dark brown iris, a stubby black bill, and black legs and feet.

== Distribution and habitat ==
The nominate subspecies of the suiriri flycatcher is the most southerly of the three. It is found in eastern and southern Bolivia, most of Paraguay, northern and eastern Argentina south to Río Negro Province, adjacent southern Brazil, and western Uruguay. Subspecies S. s. burmeisteri is found in Suriname, northern Bolivia, northeastern Paraguay, and Brazil in an area roughly bounded by Amapá, western Pará, southern Amazonas, Piauí, Mato Grosso do Sul, and São Paulo state. There are also scattered small populations of it in Amazonian Brazil. S. s. bahiae is found in northeastern Brazil from Paraíba to northeastern Bahia. The suiriri flycatcher inhabits semi-open to open landscapes. These include the Gran Chaco dry forest, open woodlands, and dry cerrado savanna. Subspecies S. s. burmeisteri inhabits only cerrado and campo ecosystems, including pockets of them within the Amazon rainforest.

== Behavior ==
=== Movement ===
The suiriri flycatcher is a year-round resident in most of its range but occurs in eastern Bolivia only in the non-breeding season.

=== Feeding ===
The suiriri flycatcher feeds on arthropods and small fruits. It takes food mostly by gleaning from leaves and branches while perched. It less often hover-gleans, sallies to take insects in flight, and drops to the ground to take prey.

=== Breeding ===
The suiriri flycatcher breeds from October to December in Argentina; its breeding season elsewhere is unknown. Its nest is a cup made from wool, spider web, and lichen, and is typically placed in a branch fork between about 3 and 6.5 m (10 and 20 ft) above the ground. The usual clutch is three eggs. The incubation period, time to fledging, and details of parental care are not known.

=== Vocalization ===
The vocalizations of the nominate and bahiae subspecies are not well documented but appear to be essentially the same. Their most common call is "a single nasal 'rowl' or 'jyow' ". Subspecies S. s. burmeisteri pairs sing in duet. Males sing "a series of sneezy 'pi-chew' notes, variable in length, [that] typically begins with several squeaky notes and ends with several monosyllabic 'chew' notes". Females sing "a series of loud, squeaky notes similar in quality to introductory notes of male song but higher in frequency and amplitude and more widely spaced, typically decelerating at end". Females also give a variety of whiny nasal notes.

== Status ==
The IUCN has assessed the suiriri flycatcher as being of Least Concern. It has a very large range; its population size is not known and is believed to be decreasing. "The species is threatened by widespread habitat conversion to pine and eucalyptus plantations and soy-bean and rice crops as well as habitat clearance for livestock farming." It is considered uncommon to fairly common across its range and occurs in many protected areas both private and public.
