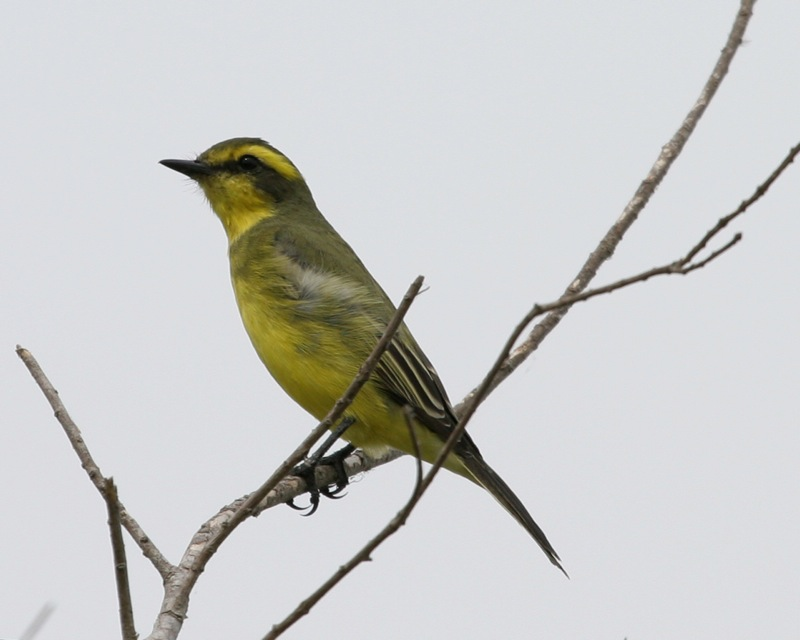

Conservation status
- Least Concern (IUCN 3.1)

Scientific classification
- Kingdom: Animalia
- Phylum: Chordata
- Class: Aves
- Order: Passeriformes
- Family: Tyrannidae
- Genus: Satrapa; Strickland, 1844
- Species: S. icterophrys

Binomial name
- Satrapa icterophrys (Vieillot, 1818)
- Year-round Non-Breeding

= Yellow-browed tyrant =

Species of bird

The yellow-browed tyrant (Satrapa icterophrys) is a species of bird in the family Tyrannidae, the tyrant flycatchers. It is found in Argentina, Bolivia, Brazil, Colombia, Paraguay, Peru, Uruguay, and Venezuela.

== Taxonomy and systematics ==
The yellow-browed tyrant was originally described by Vieillot in 1818 as Muscicapa icterophrys, erroneously placing it in the Old World flycatcher family. In 1844 Strickland moved it to genus Suiriri "for the present", expressing reluctance to place it in genus Satrapa which he had erected.

The yellow-browed tyrant is the only member of genus Satrapa and has no subspecies.

== Description ==
The yellow-browed tyrant is 15 to 16.5 cm (5.9 to 6.5 in) long and weighs about 20 g (0.71 oz). Adult males have a mostly dark grayish olive face with a bold bright yellow supercilium. Their upperparts are dark olive. Their wings are dusky black with grayish white edges on the flight feathers and grayish white tips on the coverts that show as two wing bars. Their tail is dusky with white outer webs on the outer feathers. Their underparts are bright yellow with an olive wash on the sides of the breast. Adult females are overall paler than males, especially their supercilium and throat. Their throat and breast have olive mottling. Both sexes have a dark iris, a short, narrow, black bill, and blackish legs and feet. Juveniles resemble adult females with olive spots on the breast.

== Distribution and habitat ==
The yellow-browed tyrant has a disjunct distribution. One population is found across north-central Venezuela and very slightly into eastern Colombia. Its other, much larger, range extends from far southeastern Peru across northern Bolivia and central Brazil to the Atlantic (though stopping short of the far east) and south through southern Brazil, eastern Bolivia, Paraguay, Uruguay, and northern Argentina to northern Buenos Aires Province. It inhabits the edges of forest, brushy fields, pastures with some trees, gallery forest, and treed areas around lakes and marshes. In elevation it ranges from sea level to 2,000 m (6,600 ft) in Brazil. It reaches 200 m (700 ft) in Colombia, occasionally reaches 1,000 m (3,300 ft) in Peru, and in Venezuela occurs up to 500 m (1,600 ft) north of the Orinoco River and only 150 m (500 ft) south of it. It reaches 2,800 m (9,200 ft) in Bolivia.

== Behavior ==
=== Movement ===
The yellow-browed tyrant is a year-round resident in much of its range. However, it does not breed in Colombia or Peru. Many individuals in the southern part of the larger range move north into Amazonia of west-central Brazil, northern Bolivia, and eastern Peru during the austral winter though it appears that the species does not entirely vacate the south.

=== Feeding ===
The yellow-browned tyrant feeds on insects, though details are lacking. It mostly forages singly and less often in pairs. It typically perches upright on an exposed branch. It takes prey mostly by gleaning from vegetation and branches (sometimes hover-gleaning) and less often makes short sallies to capture prey in mid-air ("hawking").

=== Breeding ===
The yellow-browed tyrant breeds between June and September in Venezuela, between October and January in Brazil and Bolivia, and between August and February in Argentina. Its nest is a shallow open cup made from rootlets and twigs. It is typically placed in a tree's branch fork or in a bush. The clutch is two to four eggs but usually three. The incubation period is 15 to 16 days and fledging occurs 15 to 20 days after hatch. Details of parental care are not known. Nest parasitism by shiny cowbirds (Molothrus bonariensis) has been observed.

=== Vocalization ===
The yellow-browed tyrant is not highly vocal. Its song is a "short, fat, nervous, ascending series of 4-5 wuh-wuh-weh-weéteet notes". It also makes a "very mild but sharp whee [and a] very low double cheep".

== Status ==
The IUCN has assessed the yellow-browed tyrant as being of Least Concern. It has a very large range; its population size is not known and is believed to be stable. No immediate threats have been identified. It is considered uncommon in Colombia, rare in Peru, and "uncommon and rare" in Venezuela. It "[t]pically breeds in habitats of human-populated areas, but occurs also in many national parks and other protected areas, especially in [the south]".
