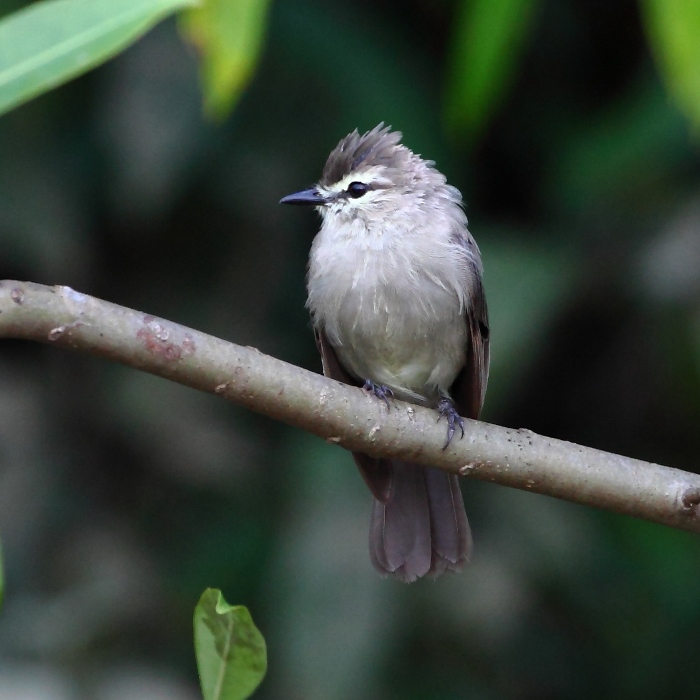
- at Apiacás river, Mato Grosso state, Brazil

Conservation status
- Least Concern (IUCN 3.1)

Scientific classification
- Kingdom: Animalia
- Phylum: Chordata
- Class: Aves
- Order: Passeriformes
- Family: Tyrannidae
- Genus: Ochthornis; P.L. Sclater, 1888
- Species: O. littoralis

Binomial name
- Ochthornis littoralis (Pelzeln, 1868)

Synonyms
- Muscicapa littoralis; Elainea littoralis; Ochthoeca littoralis

= Drab water tyrant =

Species of bird

The drab water tyrant (Ochthornis littoralis) is a species of bird in the family Tyrannidae, the tyrant flycatchers. It is found in Bolivia, Brazil, Colombia, Ecuador, Guyana, Peru, Suriname, and Venezuela.

== Taxonomy ==
The drab water tyrant was originally described as Muscicapa littoralis and in 1868 von Pelzeln assigned it to genus Elainea (now spelled Elaenia). In 1888 Sclater erected genus Ochthornis for the species. In the 1970s one author suggested merging Ochthornis into genus Ochthoeca but this treatment did not gain acceptance.

The drab water tyrant is the only member of its genus and has no subspecies.

== Description ==
The drab water tyrant is 13 to 13.5 cm (5.1 to 5.3 in) long and weighs about 13 g (0.46 oz). The sexes have the same plumage. Adults have a dark sandy brown crown and a faint whitish supercilium on an otherwise medium sandy brown face. Their nape and back are medium sandy brown and their rump a paler sandy brown. Their wings and tail are dusky brown. Their underparts are a paler sandy brown than their back. They have a dark iris, a blackish bill, and blackish legs and feet.

== Distribution and habitat ==
The drab water tyrant is a bird of the western Amazon Basin. It is found from eastern Colombia south through eastern Ecuador and eastern Peru into northwestern Bolivia and east through southern Venezuela and Guyana into Suriname and throughout northwestern and north-central Brazil. Though some sources describe a small separate range in French Guiana and adjoining northern Brazil, the South American Classification Committee of the American Ornithological Society has no records in French Guiana. The drab water tyrant is always found near water, especially large rivers. It often is found along steep banks and on islands, typically on exposed roots and piles of debris and seldom on flatter beaches. In elevation it ranges from sea level to 600 m (2,000 ft) in Brazil and up to 500 m (1,600 ft) in Colombia, 400 m (1,300 ft) in Ecuador, and 600 m (2,000 ft) in Venezuela.

== Behavior ==
=== Movement ===
The drab water tyrant is a year-round resident throughout its range. It typically flies only a short distance along the water when approached by a boat or on foot.

=== Feeding ===
The drab water tyrant feeds on insects, though details are lacking. It forages singly or in pairs. It typically perches about 1 m (3 ft) above water and makes short sallies to capture prey in mid-air ("hawking") or on the ground.

=== Breeding ===
The drab water tyrant's breeding season in Peru spans April to October but has not been defined elsewhere. Its nest there is an open cup made from grass, rootlets, and mud. It is often placed on a ledge of a steep mud bank under a log or overhang, typically about 3 m (10 ft) above the water. The clutch is three to four eggs. The incubation period, time to fledging, and details of parental care are not known.

=== Vocalization ===
The drab water tyrant seldom vocalizes. Its song is "a rapid excited series of rattling chatters: chip-chew treeee-chew treeee-chew treeee-chew treeee-chew". Its call has variously been described as "a weak, whistled fwoit or fweet", "an occasional soft free", and "a high, squeaky pee'ip or peep".

== Status ==
The IUCN has assessed the drab water tyrant as being of Least Concern. It has a very large range; its population size is not known and is believed to be stable. No immediate threats have been identified. It is considered fairly common to common overall "but sometimes thinly spread along rivers". It occurs in national parks and other protected areas throughout its range.
