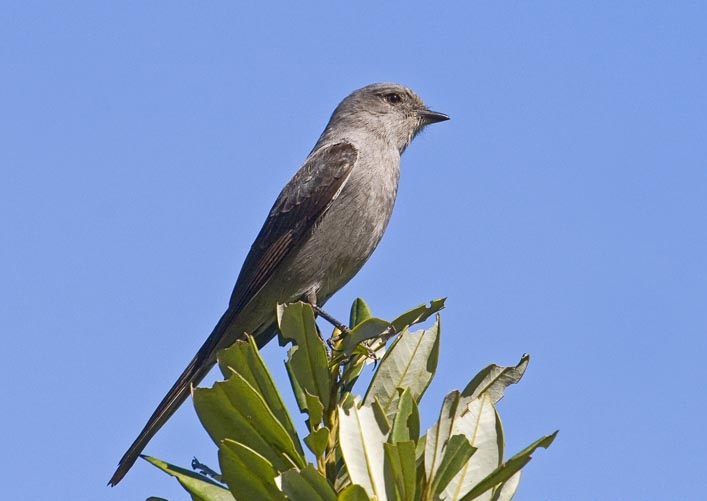

Conservation status
- Least Concern (IUCN 3.1)

Scientific classification
- Kingdom: Animalia
- Phylum: Chordata
- Class: Aves
- Order: Passeriformes
- Family: Tyrannidae
- Genus: Muscipipra; Lesson, 1831
- Species: M. vetula

Binomial name
- Muscipipra vetula (Lichtenstein, MHC, 1823)

= Shear-tailed grey tyrant =

Species of bird

The shear-tailed grey tyrant (Muscipipra vetula) is a species of bird in the family Tyrannidae, the tyrant flycatchers. It is found in Argentina, Brazil, and Paraguay.

== Taxonomy and systematics ==
The shear-tailed grey tyrant was formally described in 1823 as Muscicapa vetula, erroneously placing it in the Old World flycatcher family. It was later reassigned to its present genus Muscipipra that had been erected in 1831.

The shear-tailed tyrant is the only member of genus Muscipipra and has no subspecies.

== Description ==
The shear-tailed grey tyrant is about 20 to 22.5 cm (7.9 to 8.9 in) long. The sexes have the same plumage. Adults have a mostly dull dark gray head and upperparts. They have dusky ear coverts that form a mask. They have faint streaks on the crown and back. Their wings are dusky blackish. Their tail is long, slender, and deeply notched; it is mostly dusky blackish with pale whitish edges on the undersides of the outermost pair of feathers. They have a white chin and throat, a dark gray breast, and a pale gray belly. They have a blackish iris, a dusky bill, and dusky legs and feet. Juveniles have a white scaly appearance on the crown, back, and wings.

== Distribution and habitat ==
The shear-tailed gray tyrant is found from southern Bahia and central Minas Gerais in eastern Brazil south through southern Brazil and eastern Paraguay into northeastern Argentina's Misiones and Corrientes provinces. It primarily inhabits the edges of humid forest and secondary woodland and less often occurs in adjacent clearings and grassland. In elevation it mostly ranges between 1,000 and 2,200 m (3,300 and 7,200 ft).

== Behavior ==
=== Movement ===
Sources differ on whether the shear-tailed gray tyrant is migratory or a year-round resident throughout its range. BirdLife International (BLI) states that it breeds in all three countries of its occurrence. It also states that the species is a full migrant, meaning that it completely abandons its breeding range in the non-breeding season, yet the BLI map does not show separate breeding and non-breeding ranges. The IOC states that it breeds in all three countries and is silent on its non-breeding territory. The Clements taxonomy simply states its range as the three countries without addressing breeding. The Cornell Lab of Ornithology's Birds of the World says it is "Resident, but little known". In contrast to the other sources, the South American Classification Committee of the American Ornithological Society places the species in all three countries but states that the species does not breed in Argentina and Paraguay.

=== Feeding ===
The shear-tailed grey tyrant feeds on insects. It typically forages in pairs though groups of up to six birds are known. It usually perches on high exposed branches and hunts near the forest canopy though it will hunt lower and even to the ground. It catches most prey in mid-air with sallies, some quite long, from the perch.

=== Breeding ===
The shear-tailed grey tyrant's breeding season has not been defined but includes November in Brazil's Rio Grande do Sul. Its nest is a tall open cup made from twigs and coarse grass, with dry moss on the outside and a lining of fine grass. It is typically in shrubby vegetation within about 1 m (3 ft) of the ground. The clutch is three eggs. Nothing else is known about the species' breeding biology.

=== Vocalization ===
The shear-tailed grey tyrant is usually quiet. Its calls have been described as a "pup-pup-pup or a disyllabic whistle, jew-bewt". The second has also been rendered as a "low duh-djúp".

== Status ==
The IUCN has assessed the shear-tailed grey tyrant as being of Least Concern. It has a large range; its population size is not known and is believed to be decreasing. No immediate threats have been identified. It is considered generally rare to uncommon but regular in several public and private protected areas.
