= List of birds of Bolivia =

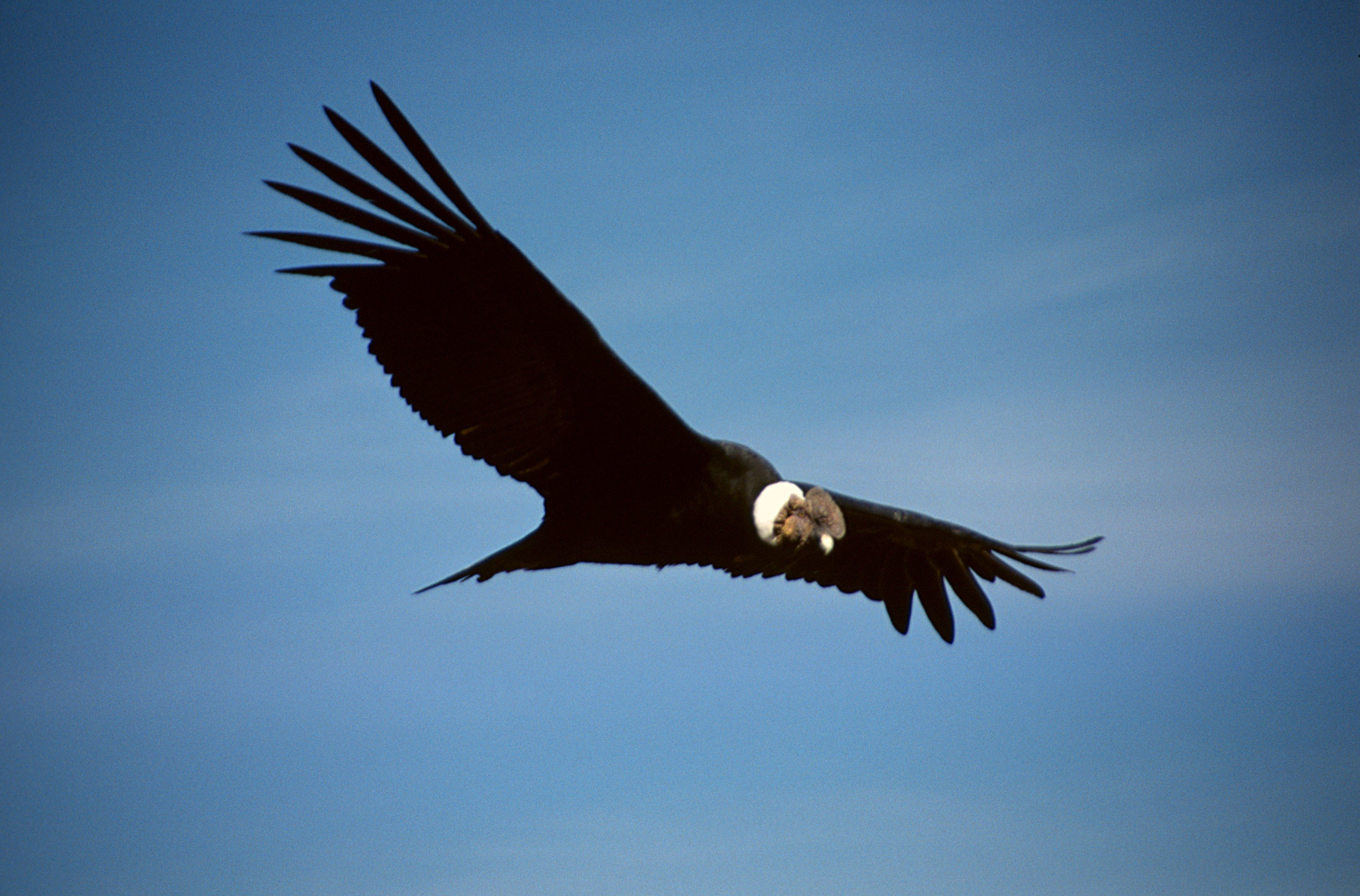
The Andean condor is the national bird of Bolivia.

This is a list of the bird species recorded in Bolivia. The avifauna of Bolivia has 1409 confirmed species. Sixteen are endemic, two have been introduced by humans, and 17 are rare or vagrants. An additional 51 species are unconfirmed (see below).

Except as an entry is cited otherwise, the list of species is that of the South American Classification Committee (SACC) of the American Ornithological Society. The list's taxonomic treatment (designation and sequence of orders, families, and species) and nomenclature (common and scientific names) are also those of the SACC unless noted otherwise. Capitalization within English names follows Wikipedia practice, i.e. only the first word of a name is capitalized unless a place name such as São Paulo is used.

The following tags have been used to highlight several categories.

- (V) Vagrant - a species that rarely or accidentally occurs in Bolivia
- (E) Endemic - a species endemic to Bolivia
- (I) Introduced - a species introduced to Bolivia as a consequence, direct or indirect, of human actions
- (U) Unconfirmed - a species recorded but with "no tangible evidence" according to the SACC

== Rheas ==
Order: Rheiformes Family: Rheidae

The rheas are large flightless birds native to South America. Their feet have three toes rather than four which allows them to run faster.

- Greater rhea, Rhea americana
- Lesser rhea, Pterocnemia pennata

== Tinamous ==
Order: Tinamiformes Family: Tinamidae

The tinamous are one of the most ancient groups of bird. Although they look similar to other ground-dwelling birds like quail and grouse, they have no close relatives and are classified as a single family, Tinamidae, within their own order, the Tinamiformes.

- Hooded tinamou, Nothocercus nigrocapillus
- Gray tinamou, Tinamus tao
- Black tinamou, Tinamus osgoodi (U)
- Great tinamou, Tinamus major
- White-throated tinamou, Tinamus guttatus
- Cinereous tinamou, Crypturellus cinereus
- Little tinamou, Crypturellus soui
- Brown tinamou, Crypturellus obsoletus
- Undulated tinamou, Crypturellus undulatus
- Brazilian tinamou, Crypturellus strigulosus
- Black-capped tinamou, Crypturellus atrocapillus
- Variegated tinamou, Crypturellus variegatus
- Bartlett's tinamou, Crypturellus bartletti
- Small-billed tinamou, Crypturellus parvirostris
- Tataupa tinamou, Crypturellus tataupa
- Red-winged tinamou, Rhynchotus rufescens
- Huayco tinamou, Rhynchotus maculicollis
- Taczanowski's tinamou, Nothoprocta taczanowskii
- Ornate tinamou, Nothoprocta ornata
- Brushland tinamou, Nothoprocta cinerascens
- Andean tinamou, Nothoprocta pentlandii
- White-bellied nothura, Nothura boraquira
- Darwin's nothura, Nothura darwinii
- Dwarf tinamou, Taoniscus nanus
- Quebracho crested-tinamou, Eudromia formosa
- Puna tinamou, Tinamotis pentlandii

== Screamers ==
Order: Anseriformes Family: Anhimidae

The screamers are a small family of birds related to the ducks. They are large, bulky birds, with a small downy head, long legs, and large feet which are only partially webbed. They have large spurs on their wings which are used in fights over mates and in territorial disputes.

- Horned screamer, Anhima cornuta
- Southern screamer, Chauna torquata

== Ducks ==
Order: Anseriformes Family: Anatidae

Anatidae includes the ducks and most duck-like waterfowl, such as geese and swans. These birds are adapted to an aquatic existence with webbed feet, flattened bills, and feathers that are excellent at shedding water due to an oily coating.

- Fulvous whistling-duck, Dendrocygna bicolor
- White-faced whistling-duck, Dendrocygna viduata
- Black-bellied whistling-duck, Dendrocygna autumnalis
- Coscoroba swan, Coscoroba coscoroba
- Orinoco goose, Oressochen jubatus
- Andean goose, Oressochen melanopterus
- Muscovy duck, Cairina moschata
- Comb duck, Sarkidiornis sylvicola
- Ringed teal, Callonetta leucophrys
- Brazilian teal, Amazonetta brasiliensis
- Torrent duck, Merganetta armata
- Crested duck, Lophonetta specularioides
- Puna teal, Spatula puna
- Silver teal, Spatula versicolor
- Red shoveler, Spatula platalea
- Northern shoveler, Spatula clypeata (U)
- Blue-winged teal, Spatula discors (U)
- Cinnamon teal, Spatula cyanoptera
- Chiloe wigeon, Mareca sibilatrix (V)
- White-cheeked pintail, Anas bahamensis
- Yellow-billed pintail, Anas georgica
- Yellow-billed teal, Anas flavirostris
- Rosy-billed pochard, Netta peposaca
- Black-headed duck, Heteronetta atricapilla
- Masked duck, Nomonyx dominicus
- Ruddy duck, Oxyura jamaicensis
- Lake duck, Oxyura vittata (U)

== Guans ==
Order: Galliformes Family: Cracidae

The Cracidae are large birds, similar in general appearance to turkeys. The guans and curassows live in trees, but the smaller chachalacas are found in more open scrubby habitats. They are generally dull-plumaged, but the curassows and some guans have colorful facial ornaments.

- Sickle-winged guan, Chamaepetes goudotii
- Andean guan, Penelope montagnii
- Rusty-margined guan, Penelope superciliaris
- Red-faced guan, Penelope dabbenei
- Spix's guan, Penelope jacquacu
- Yungas guan, Penelope bridgesi
- Blue-throated piping-guan, Pipile cumanensis
- Red-throated piping-guan, Pipile cujubi
- Chaco chachalaca, Ortalis canicollis
- Speckled chachalaca, Ortalis guttata
- Wattled curassow, Crax globulosa
- Bare-faced curassow, Crax fasciolata
- Razor-billed curassow, Mitu tuberosum
- Horned curassow, Pauxi unicornis (E)

== New World quails ==
Order: Galliformes Family: Odontophoridae

The New World quails are small, plump, terrestrial birds only distantly related to the quails of the Old World, but named for their similar appearance and habits.

- Marbled wood-quail, Odontophorus gujanensis
- Rufous-breasted wood-quail, Odontophorus speciosus
- Stripe-faced wood-quail, Odontophorus balliviani
- Starred wood-quail, Odontophorus stellatus

== Flamingos ==
Order: Phoenicopteriformes Family: Phoenicopteridae

Flamingos are gregarious wading birds, usually 3 to 5 feet (0.9 to 1.5 m) tall, found in both the Western and Eastern Hemispheres. Flamingos filter-feed on shellfish and algae. Their oddly shaped beaks are specially adapted to separate mud and silt from the food they consume and, uniquely, are used upside-down.

- Chilean flamingo, Phoenicopterus chilensis
- Andean flamingo, Phoenicoparrus andinus
- James's flamingo, Phoenicoparrus jamesi

== Grebes ==
Order: Podicipediformes Family: Podicipedidae

Grebes are small to medium-large freshwater diving birds. They have lobed toes and are excellent swimmers and divers. However, they have their feet placed far back on the body, making them quite ungainly on land.

- White-tufted grebe, Rollandia rolland
- Titicaca grebe, Rollandia microptera
- Least grebe, Tachybaptus dominicus
- Pied-billed grebe, Podilymbus podiceps
- Silvery grebe, Podiceps occipitalis

== Pigeons ==
Order: Columbiformes Family: Columbidae

Pigeons and doves are stout-bodied birds with short necks and short slender bills with a fleshy cere.

- Rock pigeon, Columba livia (I)
- Scaled pigeon, Patagioenas speciosa
- Picazuro pigeon, Patagioenas picazuro
- Spot-winged pigeon, Patagioenas maculosa
- Band-tailed pigeon, Patagioenas fasciata
- Pale-vented pigeon, Patagioenas cayennensis
- Plumbeous pigeon, Patagioenas plumbea
- Ruddy pigeon, Patagioenas subvinacea
- Ruddy quail-dove, Geotrygon montana
- Violaceous quail-dove, Geotrygon violacea
- White-tipped dove, Leptotila verreauxi
- Gray-fronted dove, Leptotila rufaxilla
- Large-tailed dove, Leptotila megalura
- White-throated quail-dove, Zentrygon frenata
- Eared dove, Zenaida auriculata
- Blue ground dove, Claravis pretiosa
- Long-tailed ground dove, Uropelia campestris
- Maroon-chested ground dove, Paraclaravis mondetoura
- Bare-faced ground dove, Metriopelia ceciliae
- Black-winged ground dove, Metriopelia melanoptera
- Golden-spotted ground dove, Metriopelia aymara
- Common ground dove, Columbina passerina
- Plain-breasted ground dove, Columbina minuta
- Ruddy ground dove, Columbina talpacoti
- Scaled dove, Columbina squammata
- Picui ground dove, Columbina picui

== Cuckoos ==
Order: Cuculiformes Family: Cuculidae

The family Cuculidae includes cuckoos, roadrunners, and anis. These birds are of variable size with slender bodies, long tails, and strong legs.

- Guira cuckoo, Guira guira
- Greater ani, Crotophaga major
- Smooth-billed ani, Crotophaga ani
- Striped cuckoo, Tapera naevia
- Pheasant cuckoo, Dromococcyx phasianellus
- Pavonine cuckoo, Dromococcyx pavoninus
- Rufous-vented ground-cuckoo, Neomorphus geoffroyi
- Little cuckoo, Coccycua minuta
- Ash-colored cuckoo, Coccycua cinerea
- Squirrel cuckoo, Piaya cayana
- Black-bellied cuckoo, Piaya melanogaster
- Dark-billed cuckoo, Coccyzus melacoryphus
- Yellow-billed cuckoo, Coccyzus americanus
- Pearly-breasted cuckoo, Coccyzus euleri
- Black-billed cuckoo, Coccyzus erythropthalmus

== Oilbird ==
Order: Steatornithiformes Family: Steatornithidae

The oilbird is a slim, long-winged bird related to the nightjars. It is nocturnal and a specialist feeder on the fruit of the oil palm.

- Oilbird, Steatornis caripensis

== Potoos ==
Order: Nyctibiiformes Family: Nyctibiidae

The potoos (sometimes called poor-me-ones) are large near passerine birds related to the nightjars and frogmouths. They are nocturnal insectivores which lack the bristles around the mouth found in the true nightjars.

- Rufous potoo, Phyllaemulor bracteatus (U)
- Great potoo, Nyctibius grandis
- Long-tailed potoo, Nyctibius aethereus
- Common potoo, Nyctibius griseus
- Andean potoo, Nyctibius maculosus

== Nightjars ==
Order: Caprimulgiformes Family: Caprimulgidae

Nightjars are medium-sized nocturnal birds that usually nest on the ground. They have long wings, short legs, and very short bills. Most have small feet, of little use for walking, and long pointed wings. Their soft plumage is camouflaged to resemble bark or leaves.

- Nacunda nighthawk, Chordeiles nacunda
- Least nighthawk, Chordeiles pusillus
- Sand-colored nighthawk, Chordeiles rupestris
- Lesser nighthawk, Chordeiles acutipennis
- Common nighthawk, Chordeiles minor
- Band-tailed nighthawk, Nyctiprogne leucopyga
- Short-tailed nighthawk, Lurocalis semitorquatus
- Rufous-bellied nighthawk, Lurocalis rufiventris
- Blackish nightjar, Nyctipolus nigrescens
- Common pauraque, Nyctidromus albicollis
- Swallow-tailed nightjar, Uropsalis segmentata
- Lyre-tailed nightjar, Uropsalis lyra
- Little nightjar, Setopagis parvula
- Spot-tailed nightjar, Hydropsalis maculicaudus
- Ladder-tailed nightjar, Hydropsalis climacocerca
- Scissor-tailed nightjar, Hydropsalis torquata
- Band-winged nightjar, Systellura longirostris
- White-winged nightjar, Eleothreptus candicans
- Ocellated poorwill, Nyctiphrynus ocellatus
- Silky-tailed nightjar, Antrostomus sericocaudatus
- Rufous nightjar, Antrostomus rufus

== Swifts ==
Order: Apodiformes Family: Apodidae

Swifts are small birds which spend the majority of their lives flying. These birds have very short legs and never settle voluntarily on the ground, perching instead only on vertical surfaces. Many swifts have long swept-back wings which resemble a crescent or boomerang.

- Spot-fronted swift, Cypseloides cherriei (U)
- White-chinned swift, Cypseloides cryptus
- White-chested swift, Cypseloides lemosi
- Rothschild's swift, Cypseloides rothschildi
- Great dusky swift, Cypseloides senex (U)
- Chestnut-collared swift, Streptoprocne rutila
- White-collared swift, Streptoprocne zonaris
- Biscutate swift, Streptoprocne biscutata
- Gray-rumped swift, Chaetura cinereiventris
- Pale-rumped swift, Chaetura egregia
- Chimney swift, Chaetura pelagica (U)
- Chapman's swift, Chaetura chapmani
- Sick's swift, Chaetura meridionalis
- Short-tailed swift, Chaetura brachyura
- White-tipped swift, Aeronautes montivagus
- Andean swift, Aeronautes andecolus
- Fork-tailed palm-swift, Tachornis squamata
- Lesser swallow-tailed swift, Panyptila cayennensis

== Hummingbirds ==
Order: Apodiformes Family: Trochilidae

Hummingbirds are small birds capable of hovering in mid-air due to the rapid flapping of their wings. They are the only birds that can fly backwards.

- White-necked jacobin, Florisuga mellivora
- Buff-tailed sicklebill, Eutoxeres condamini
- Rufous-breasted hermit, Glaucis hirsutus
- Pale-tailed barbthroat, Threnetes leucurus
- Cinnamon-throated hermit, Phaethornis nattereri
- Reddish hermit, Phaethornis ruber
- White-browed hermit, Phaethornis stuarti
- Buff-bellied hermit, Phaethornis subochraceus
- Planalto hermit, Phaethornis pretrei
- White-bearded hermit, Phaethornis hispidus
- Green hermit, Phaethornis guy (U)
- Needle-billed hermit, Phaethornis philippii
- Great-billed hermit, Phaethornis malaris
- Green-fronted lancebill, Doryfera ludovicae
- Geoffroy's daggerbill, Schistes geoffroyi
- Brown violetear, Colibri delphinae
- Lesser violetear, Colibri cyanotus
- Sparkling violetear, Colibri coruscans
- White-vented violetear, Colibri serrirostris
- Horned sungem, Heliactin bilophus
- Black-eared fairy, Heliothryx auritus
- White-tailed goldenthroat, Polytmus guainumbi
- Green-tailed goldenthroat, Polytmus theresiae
- Ruby-topaz hummingbird, Chrysolampis mosquitus
- Black-throated mango, Anthracothorax nigricollis
- Amethyst-throated sunangel, Heliangelus amethysticollis
- Wire-crested thorntail, Discosura popelairii (U)
- Black-bellied thorntail, Discosura langsdorffi
- Coppery thorntail, Discosura letitiae (E)
- Dot-eared coquette, Lophornis gouldii (V)
- Rufous-crested coquette, Lophornis delattrei
- Butterfly coquette, Lophornis verreauxii
- Speckled hummingbird, Adelomyia melanogenys
- Long-tailed sylph, Aglaiocercus kingii
- Red-tailed comet, Sappho sparganurus
- Andean hillstar, Oreotrochilus estella
- White-sided hillstar, Oreotrochilus leucopleurus
- Wedge-tailed hillstar, Oreotrochilus adela
- Green-tailed trainbearer, Lesbia nuna
- Purple-backed thornbill, Ramphomicron microrhynchum
- Rufous-capped thornbill, Chalcostigma ruficeps
- Olivaceous thornbill, Chalcostigma olivaceum
- Blue-mantled thornbill, Chalcostigma stanleyi
- Tyrian metaltail, Metallura tyrianthina
- Scaled metaltail, Metallura aeneocauda
- Buff-thighed puffleg, Haplophaedia assimilis
- Sapphire-vented puffleg, Eriocnemis luciani (U)
- Blue-capped puffleg, Eriocnemis glaucopoides
- Black-hooded sunbeam, Aglaeactis pamela (E)
- Bronzy Inca, Coeligena coeligena
- Collared Inca, Coeligena torquata
- Violet-throated starfrontlet, Coeligena violifer
- Sword-billed hummingbird, Ensifera ensifera
- Great sapphirewing, Pterophanes cyanopterus
- Booted racket-tail, Ocreatus underwoodii
- Rufous-webbed brilliant, Heliodoxa branickii (U)
- Gould's jewelfront, Heliodoxa aurescens
- Fawn-breasted brilliant, Heliodoxa rubinoides (V)
- Violet-fronted brilliant, Heliodoxa leadbeateri
- Northern giant-hummingbird, Patagona peruviana
- Southern giant-hummingbird, Patagona gigas
- Long-billed starthroat, Heliomaster longirostris
- Blue-tufted starthroat, Heliomaster furcifer
- White-bellied woodstar, Chaetocercus mulsant
- Slender-tailed woodstar, Microstilbon burmeisteri
- Amethyst woodstar, Calliphlox amethystina
- Blue-tailed emerald, Chlorostilbon mellisugus
- Glittering-bellied emerald, Chlorostilbon lucidus
- Violet-headed hummingbird, Klais guimeti
- Gray-breasted sabrewing, Campylopterus largipennis
- Swallow-tailed hummingbird, Eupetomena macroura
- Fork-tailed woodnymph, Thalurania furcata
- Many-spotted hummingbird, Taphrospilus hypostictus
- Versicolored emerald, Chrysuronia versicolor
- Golden-tailed sapphire, Chrysuronia oenone
- Glittering-throated emerald, Chionomesa fimbriata
- Sapphire-spangled emerald, Chionomesa lactea
- Rufous-throated sapphire, Hylocharis sapphirina
- Gilded hummingbird, Hylocharis chrysura
- White-bellied hummingbird, Elliotomyia chionogaster
- Green-and-white hummingbird, Elliotomyia viridicauda (U)
- White-chinned sapphire, Chlorestes cyanus

== Hoatzin ==
Order: Opisthocomiformes Family: Opisthocomidae

The hoatzin is pheasant-sized, but much slimmer. It has a long tail and neck, but a small head with an unfeathered blue face and red eyes which are topped by a spiky crest. It is a weak flier which is found in the swamps of the Amazon and Orinoco rivers.

- Hoatzin, Opisthocomus hoazin

== Limpkin ==
Order: Gruiformes Family: Aramidae

The limpkin resembles a large rail. It has drab-brown plumage and a grayer head and neck.

- Limpkin, Aramus guarauna

== Trumpeters ==
Order: Gruiformes Family: Psophiidae

The trumpeters are dumpy birds with long necks and legs and chicken-like bills. They are named for the trumpeting call of the males.

- Pale-winged trumpeter, Psophia leucoptera
- Dark-winged trumpeter, Psophia viridis (U)

== Rails ==
Order: Gruiformes Family: Rallidae

Rallidae is a large family of small to medium-sized birds which includes the rails, crakes, coots, and gallinules. Typically they inhabit dense vegetation in damp environments near lakes, swamps, or rivers. In general they are shy and secretive birds, making them difficult to observe. Most species have strong legs and long toes which are well adapted to soft uneven surfaces. They tend to have short rounded wings and to be weak fliers.

- Purple gallinule, Porphyrio martinica
- Azure gallinule, Porphyrio flavirostris
- Chestnut-headed crake, Anurolimnas castaneiceps
- Russet-crowned crake, Anurolimnas viridis
- Rufous-sided crake, Laterallus melanophaius
- Gray-breasted crake, Laterallus exilis
- Rufous-faced crake, Laterallus xenopterus
- Speckled rail, Coturnicops notatus (U)
- Ocellated crake, Micropygia schomburgkii
- Ash-throated crake, Mustelirallus albicollis
- Paint-billed crake, Mustelirallus erythrops
- Spotted rail, Pardirallus maculatus
- Blackish rail, Pardirallus nigricans (U)
- Plumbeous rail, Pardirallus sanguinolentus
- Giant wood-rail, Aramides ypecaha
- Gray-cowled wood-rail, Aramides cajaneus
- Uniform crake, Amaurolimnas concolor
- Spot-flanked gallinule, Porphyriops melanops
- Yellow-breasted crake, Porzana flaviventer
- Common gallinule, Gallinula galeata
- Red-fronted coot, Fulica rufifrons
- Horned coot, Fulica cornuta
- Giant coot, Fulica gigantea
- Red-gartered coot, Fulica armillata (U)
- Slate-colored coot, Fulica ardesiaca
- White-winged coot, Fulica leucoptera

== Finfoots ==
Order: Gruiformes Family: Heliornithidae

Heliornithidae is a small family of tropical birds with webbed lobes on their feet similar to those of grebes and coots.

- Sungrebe, Heliornis fulica

== Plovers ==
Order: Charadriiformes Family: Charadriidae

The family Charadriidae includes the plovers, dotterels, and lapwings. They are small to medium-sized birds with compact bodies, short, thick necks, and long, usually pointed, wings. They are found in open country worldwide, mostly in habitats near water.

- Black-bellied plover, Pluvialis squatarola (V)
- American golden-plover, Pluvialis dominica
- Tawny-throated dotterel, Oreopholus ruficollis
- Pied lapwing, Hoploxypterus cayanus
- Diademed sandpiper-plover, Phegornis mitchellii
- Killdeer, Charadrius vociferus (U)
- Semipalmated plover, Charadrius semipalmatus (V)
- Southern lapwing, Vanellus chilensis
- Andean lapwing, Vanellus resplendens
- Collared plover, Anarynchus collaris
- Puna plover, Anarynchus alticola

== Avocets and stilts ==
Order: Charadriiformes Family: Recurvirostridae

Recurvirostridae is a family of large wading birds, which includes the avocets and stilts. The avocets have long legs and long up-curved bills. The stilts have extremely long legs and long, thin, straight bills.

- Black-necked stilt, Himantopus mexicanus
- Andean avocet, Recurvirostra andina

== Sandpipers ==
Order: Charadriiformes Family: Scolopacidae

Scolopacidae is a large diverse family of small to medium-sized shorebirds including the sandpipers, curlews, godwits, shanks, tattlers, woodcocks, snipes, dowitchers, and phalaropes. The majority of these species eat small invertebrates picked out of the mud or soil. Variation in length of legs and bills enables multiple species to feed in the same habitat, particularly on the coast, without direct competition for food.

- Upland sandpiper, Bartramia longicauda
- Whimbrel, Numenius phaeopus (V)
- Hudsonian godwit, Limosa haemastica
- Ruddy turnstone, Arenaria interpres (V)
- Red knot, Calidris canutus (U)
- Sharp-tailed sandpiper, Calidris acuminata (V)
- Stilt sandpiper, Calidris himantopus
- Sanderling, Calidris alba (V)
- Baird's sandpiper, Calidris bairdii
- Least sandpiper, Calidris minutilla
- White-rumped sandpiper, Calidris fuscicollis
- Buff-breasted sandpiper, Calidris subruficollis
- Pectoral sandpiper, Calidris melanotos
- Jameson's snipe, Gallinago jamesoni
- Giant snipe, Gallinago undulata
- Pantanal snipe, Gallinago paraguaiae
- Puna snipe, Gallinago andina
- Wilson's phalarope, Phalaropus tricolor
- Spotted sandpiper, Actitis macularius
- Solitary sandpiper, Tringa solitaria
- Greater yellowlegs, Tringa melanoleuca
- Lesser yellowlegs, Tringa flavipes

== Seedsnipes ==
Order: Charadriiformes Family: Thinocoridae

The seedsnipes are a small family of birds that superficially resemble sparrows. They have short legs and long wings and are herbivorous waders.

- Rufous-bellied seedsnipe, Attagis gayi
- Gray-breasted seedsnipe, Thinocorus orbignyianus
- Least seedsnipe, Thinocorus rumicivorus

== Jacanas ==
Order: Charadriiformes Family: Jacanidae

The jacanas are a family of waders found throughout the tropics. They are identifiable by their huge feet and claws which enable them to walk on floating vegetation in the shallow lakes that are their preferred habitat.

- Wattled jacana, Jacana jacana

== Painted-snipes ==
Order: Charadriiformes Family: Rostratulidae

Painted-snipes are short-legged, long-billed birds similar in shape to the true snipes, but more brightly colored.

- South American painted-snipe, Nycticryphes semicollaris

== Gulls ==
Order: Charadriiformes Family: Laridae

Laridae is a family of medium to large seabirds and includes gulls, kittiwakes, and terns. Gulls are typically gray or white, often with black markings on the head or wings. They have longish bills and webbed feet. Terns are a group of generally medium to large seabirds typically with gray or white plumage, often with black markings on the head. Most terns hunt fish by diving but some pick insects off the surface of fresh water. Terns are generally long-lived birds, with several species known to live in excess of 30 years.

- Black skimmer, Rynchops niger
- Andean gull, Chroicocephalus serranus
- Laughing gull, Leucophaeus atricilla (V)
- Franklin's gull, Leucophaeus pipixcan (V)
- Yellow-billed tern, Sternula superciliaris
- Large-billed tern, Phaetusa simplex
- Common tern, Sterna hirundo (V)
- Arctic tern, Sterna paradisaea (U)

== Sunbittern ==
Order: Eurypygiformes Family: Eurypygidae

The sunbittern is a bittern-like bird of tropical regions of the Americas and the sole member of the family Eurypygidae (sometimes spelled Eurypigidae) and genus Eurypyga.

- Sunbittern, Eurypyga helias

== Northern storm-petrels ==
Order: Procellariiformes Family: Hydrobatidae

Though the members of this family are similar in many respects to the southern storm-petrels, including their general appearance and habits, there are enough genetic differences to warrant their placement in a separate family.

- Markham's storm-petrel, Hydrobates markhami (V)

== Storks ==
Order: Ciconiiformes Family: Ciconiidae

Storks are large, long-legged, long-necked wading birds with long, stout bills. Storks are mute, but bill-clattering is an important mode of communication at the nest. Their nests can be large and may be reused for many years. Many species are migratory.

- Maguari stork, Ciconia maguari
- Jabiru, Jabiru mycteria
- Wood stork, Mycteria americana

== Anhingas ==
Order: Suliformes Family: Anhingidae

Anhingas are often called "snake-birds" because of their long thin neck, which gives a snake-like appearance when they swim with their bodies submerged. The males have black and dark-brown plumage, an erectile crest on the nape, and a larger bill than the female. The females have much paler plumage especially on the neck and underparts. The darters have completely webbed feet and their legs are short and set far back on the body. Their plumage is somewhat permeable, like that of cormorants, and they spread their wings to dry after diving.

- Anhinga, Anhinga anhinga

== Cormorants ==
Order: Suliformes Family: Phalacrocoracidae

Phalacrocoracidae is a family of medium to large coastal, fish-eating seabirds that includes cormorants and shags. Plumage coloration varies, with the majority having mainly dark plumage, some species being black-and-white and a few being colorful.

- Neotropic cormorant, Phalacrocorax brasilianus

== Herons ==
Order: Pelecaniformes Family: Ardeidae

The family Ardeidae contains the bitterns, herons, and egrets. Herons and egrets are medium to large wading birds with long necks and legs. Bitterns tend to be shorter necked and more wary. Members of Ardeidae fly with their necks retracted, unlike other long-necked birds such as storks, ibises, and spoonbills.

- Rufescent tiger-heron, Tigrisoma lineatum
- Fasciated tiger-heron, Tigrisoma fasciatum
- Boat-billed heron, Cochlearius cochlearius
- Agami heron, Agamia agami
- Zigzag heron, Zebrilus undulatus
- Stripe-backed bittern, Ixobrychus involucris
- Least bittern, Ixobrychus exilis
- Pinnated bittern, Botaurus pinnatus
- Capped heron, Pilherodius pileatus
- Whistling heron, Syrigma sibilatrix
- Little blue heron, Egretta caerulea
- Snowy egret, Egretta thula
- Black-crowned night-heron, Nycticorax nycticorax
- Striated heron, Butorides striata
- Cattle egret, Ardea ibis
- Great egret, Ardea alba
- Cocoi heron, Ardea cocoi

== Ibises ==
Order: Pelecaniformes Family: Threskiornithidae

Threskiornithidae is a family of large terrestrial and wading birds which includes the ibises and spoonbills. They have long, broad wings with 11 primary and about 20 secondary feathers. They are strong fliers and despite their size and weight, very capable soarers.

- White-faced ibis, Plegadis chihi
- Puna ibis, Plegadis ridgwayi
- Green ibis, Mesembrinibis cayennensis
- Bare-faced ibis, Phimosus infuscatus
- Plumbeous ibis, Theristicus caerulescens
- Buff-necked ibis, Theristicus caudatus
- Andean ibis, Theristicus branickii
- Roseate spoonbill, Platalea ajaja

== New World vultures ==
Order: Cathartiformes Family: Cathartidae

The New World vultures are not closely related to Old World vultures, but superficially resemble them because of convergent evolution. Like the Old World vultures, they are scavengers. However, unlike Old World vultures, which find carcasses by sight, New World vultures have a good sense of smell with which they locate carrion.

- King vulture, Sarcoramphus papa
- Andean condor, Vultur gryphus
- Black vulture, Coragyps atratus
- Turkey vulture, Cathartes aura
- Lesser yellow-headed vulture, Cathartes burrovianus
- Greater yellow-headed vulture, Cathartes melambrotus

== Osprey ==
Order: Accipitriformes Family: Pandionidae

The family Pandionidae contains only one species, the osprey. The osprey is a medium-large raptor which is a specialist fish-eater with a worldwide distribution.

- Osprey, Pandion haliaetus

== Hawks ==
Order: Accipitriformes Family: Accipitridae

Accipitridae is a family of birds of prey, which includes hawks, eagles, kites, harriers, and Old World vultures. These birds have powerful hooked beaks for tearing flesh from their prey, strong legs, powerful talons, and keen eyesight.

- Pearl kite, Gampsonyx swainsonii
- White-tailed kite, Elanus leucurus
- Hook-billed kite, Chondrohierax uncinatus
- Gray-headed kite, Leptodon cayanensis
- Swallow-tailed kite, Elanoides forficatus
- Crested eagle, Morphnus guianensis
- Harpy eagle, Harpia harpyja
- Black hawk-eagle, Spizaetus tyrannus
- Ornate hawk-eagle, Spizaetus ornatus
- Black-and-white hawk-eagle, Spizaetus melanoleucus
- Black-and-chestnut eagle, Spizaetus isidori
- Black-collared hawk, Busarellus nigricollis
- Snail kite, Rostrhamus sociabilis
- Slender-billed kite, Helicolestes hamatus
- Double-toothed kite, Harpagus bidentatus
- Rufous-thighed kite, Harpagus diodon
- Mississippi kite, Ictinia mississippiensis
- Plumbeous kite, Ictinia plumbea
- Gray-bellied hawk, Accipiter poliogaster
- Sharp-shinned hawk, Accipiter striatus
- Bicolored hawk, Astur bicolor
- Cinereous harrier, Circus cinereus
- Long-winged harrier, Circus buffoni
- Tiny hawk, Microspizias superciliosus
- Semicollared hawk, Microspizias collaris
- Crane hawk, Geranospiza caerulescens
- Slate-colored hawk, Buteogallus schistaceus
- Savanna hawk, Buteogallus meridionalis
- Great black hawk, Buteogallus urubitinga
- Solitary eagle, Buteogallus solitarius
- Chaco eagle, Buteogallus coronatus
- Roadside hawk, Rupornis magnirostris
- Harris's hawk, Parabuteo unicinctus
- White-rumped hawk, Parabuteo leucorrhous
- White-tailed hawk, Geranoaetus albicaudatus
- Variable hawk, Geranoaetus polyosoma
- Black-chested buzzard-eagle, Geranoaetus melanoleucus
- White hawk, Pseudastur albicollis
- White-browed hawk, Leucopternis kuhli
- Gray-lined hawk, Buteo nitidus
- Broad-winged hawk, Buteo platypterus
- White-throated hawk, Buteo albigula
- Short-tailed hawk, Buteo brachyurus
- Swainson's hawk, Buteo swainsoni
- Zone-tailed hawk, Buteo albonotatus

== Barn owls ==
Order: Strigiformes Family: Tytonidae

Barn owls are medium to large owls with large heads and characteristic heart-shaped faces. They have long strong legs with powerful talons.

- American barn owl, Tyto furcata

== Owls ==
Order: Strigiformes Family: Strigidae

The typical owls are small to large solitary nocturnal birds of prey. They have large forward-facing eyes and ears, a hawk-like beak, and a conspicuous circle of feathers around each eye called a facial disk.

- White-throated screech-owl, Megascops albogularis
- Tropical screech-owl, Megascops choliba
- Rufescent screech-owl, Megascops ingens
- Cloud-forest screech-owl, Megascops marshalli
- Montane forest screech-owl, Megascops hoyi
- Foothill screech-owl, Megascops roraimae
- Tawny-bellied screech-owl, Megascops watsonii
- Crested owl, Lophostrix cristata
- Spectacled owl, Pulsatrix perspicillata
- Band-bellied owl, Pulsatrix melanota
- Tropical horned owl, Bubo nacurutu
- Magellanic horned owl, Bubo magellanicus
- Rusty-barred owl, Strix hylophila
- Chaco owl, Strix chacoensis
- Mottled owl, Strix virgata
- Black-banded owl, Strix huhula
- Rufous-banded owl, Strix albitarsis
- Yungas pygmy-owl, Glaucidium bolivianum
- Subtropical pygmy-owl, Glaucidium parkeri
- Amazonian pygmy-owl, Glaucidium hardyi
- Ferruginous pygmy-owl, Glaucidium brasilianum
- Burrowing owl, Athene cunicularia
- Buff-fronted owl, Aegolius harrisii
- Striped owl, Asio clamator
- Stygian owl, Asio stygius
- Short-eared owl, Asio flammeus

== Trogons ==
Order: Trogoniformes Family: Trogonidae

The family Trogonidae includes trogons and quetzals. Found in tropical woodlands worldwide, they feed on insects and fruit, and their broad bills and weak legs reflect their diet and arboreal habits. Although their flight is fast, they are reluctant to fly any distance. Trogons have soft, often colorful, feathers with distinctive male and female plumage.

- Pavonine quetzal, Pharomachrus pavoninus
- Golden-headed quetzal, Pharomachrus auriceps
- Crested quetzal, Pharomachrus antisianus
- Black-tailed trogon, Trogon melanurus
- Green-backed trogon, Trogon viridis
- Amazonian violaceous-trogon, Trogon ramonianus
- Blue-crowned trogon, Trogon curucui
- Amazonian black-throated trogon, Trogon rufus
- Collared trogon, Trogon collaris
- Masked trogon, Trogon personatus

== Motmots ==
Order: Coraciiformes Family: Momotidae

The motmots have colorful plumage and long, graduated tails which they display by waggling back and forth. In most of the species, the barbs near the ends of the two longest (central) tail feathers are weak and fall off, leaving a length of bare shaft and creating a racket-shaped tail.

- Broad-billed motmot, Electron platyrhynchum
- Rufous motmot, Baryphthengus martii
- Amazonian motmot, Momotus momota
- Andean motmot, Momotus aequatorialis

== Kingfishers ==
Order: Coraciiformes Family: Alcedinidae

Kingfishers are medium-sized birds with large heads, long pointed bills, short legs, and stubby tails.

- Ringed kingfisher, Megaceryle torquata
- Amazon kingfisher, Chloroceryle amazona
- American pygmy kingfisher, Chloroceryle aenea
- Green kingfisher, Chloroceryle americana
- Green-and-rufous kingfisher, Chloroceryle inda

== Jacamars ==
Order: Galbuliformes Family: Galbulidae

The jacamars are near passerine birds from tropical South America, with a range that extends up to Mexico. They feed on insects caught on the wing, and are glossy, elegant birds with long bills and tails. In appearance and behavior they resemble the Old World bee-eaters, although they are more closely related to puffbirds.

- Purus jacamar, Galbalcyrhynchus purusianus
- White-throated jacamar, Brachygalba albogularis
- Brown jacamar, Brachygalba lugubris
- Blue-cheeked jacamar, Galbula cyanicollis
- Rufous-tailed jacamar, Galbula ruficauda
- Bluish-fronted jacamar, Galbula cyanescens
- Bronzy jacamar, Galbula leucogastra
- Paradise jacamar, Galbula dea
- Great jacamar, Jacamerops aureus

== Puffbirds ==
Order: Galbuliformes Family: Bucconidae

The puffbirds are related to the jacamars and have the same range, but lack the iridescent colors of that family. They are mainly brown, rufous, or gray, with large heads and flattened bills with hooked tips. The loose abundant plumage and short tails makes them look stout and puffy, giving rise to the English common name of the family.

- White-necked puffbird, Notharchus hyperrhynchus
- Brown-banded puffbird, Notharchus ordii
- Pied puffbird, Notharchus tectus
- Chestnut-capped puffbird, Bucco macrodactylus
- Spotted puffbird, Bucco tamatia
- Collared puffbird, Bucco capensis
- Western striolated-puffbird, Nystalus obamais
- Eastern striolated-puffbird, Nystalus striolatus
- White-eared puffbird, Nystalus chacuru
- Spot-backed puffbird, Nystalus maculatus
- Semicollared puffbird, Malacoptila semicincta
- Rufous-necked puffbird, Malacoptila rufa
- Black-streaked puffbird, Malacoptila fulvogularis
- Lanceolated monklet, Micromonacha lanceolata
- Fulvous-chinned nunlet, Nonnula sclateri
- Rufous-capped nunlet, Nonnula ruficapilla
- Black-fronted nunbird, Monasa nigrifrons
- White-fronted nunbird, Monasa morphoeus
- Yellow-billed nunbird, Monasa flavirostris
- Swallow-winged puffbird, Chelidoptera tenebrosa

== New World barbets ==
Order: Piciformes Family: Capitonidae

The barbets are plump birds, with short necks and large heads. They get their name from the bristles which fringe their heavy bills. Most species are brightly colored.

- Black-girdled barbet, Capito dayi (U)
- Gilded barbet, Capito auratus
- Lemon-throated barbet, Eubucco richardsoni
- Scarlet-hooded barbet, Eubucco tucinkae (U)
- Versicolored barbet, Eubucco versicolor

== Toucans ==
Order: Piciformes Family: Ramphastidae

Toucans are near passerine birds from the Neotropics. They are brightly marked and have enormous colorful bills which in some species amount to half their body length.

- Toco toucan, Ramphastos toco
- White-throated toucan, Ramphastos tucanus
- Channel-billed toucan, Ramphastos vitellinus
- Southern emerald-toucanet, Aulacorhynchus albivitta
- Chestnut-tipped toucanet, Aulacorhynchus derbianus
- Blue-banded toucanet, Aulacorhynchus coeruleicinctis
- Hooded mountain-toucan, Andigena cucullata
- Golden-collared toucanet, Selenidera reinwardtii
- Gould's toucanet, Selenidera gouldii
- Lettered aracari, Pteroglossus inscriptus
- Chestnut-eared aracari, Pteroglossus castanotis
- Ivory-billed aracari, Pteroglossus azara
- Curl-crested aracari, Pteroglossus beauharnaisii
- Red-necked aracari, Pteroglossus bitorquatus

== Woodpeckers ==
Order: Piciformes Family: Picidae

Woodpeckers are small to medium-sized birds with chisel-like beaks, short legs, stiff tails, and long tongues used for capturing insects. Some species have feet with two toes pointing forward and two backward, while several species have only three toes. Many woodpeckers have the habit of tapping noisily on tree trunks with their beaks.

- Bar-breasted piculet, Picumnus aurifrons
- White-barred piculet, Picumnus cirratus
- Ocellated piculet, Picumnus dorbignyanus
- White-wedged piculet, Picumnus albosquamatus
- Rusty-necked piculet, Picumnus fuscus
- Rufous-breasted piculet, Picumnus rufiventris
- White woodpecker, Melanerpes candidus
- Yellow-tufted woodpecker, Melanerpes cruentatus
- White-fronted woodpecker, Melanerpes cactorum
- Smoky-brown woodpecker, Dryobates fumigatus
- Checkered woodpecker, Dryobates mixtus
- Striped woodpecker, Dryobates lignarius
- Little woodpecker, Dryobates passerinus
- Dot-fronted woodpecker, Dryobates frontalis
- Bar-bellied woodpecker, Dryobates nigriceps
- Red-stained woodpecker, Dryobates affinis
- Crimson-bellied woodpecker, Campephilus haematogaster
- Red-necked woodpecker, Campephilus rubricollis
- Crimson-crested woodpecker, Campephilus melanoleucos
- Cream-backed woodpecker, Campephilus leucopogon
- Lineated woodpecker, Dryocopus lineatus
- Black-bodied woodpecker, Dryocopus schulzi
- Ringed woodpecker, Celeus torquatus
- Variable woodpecker, Celeus undatus
- Cream-colored woodpecker, Celeus flavus
- Rufous-headed woodpecker, Celeus spectabilis
- Chestnut woodpecker, Celeus elegans
- Pale-crested woodpecker, Celeus lugubris
- White-throated woodpecker, Piculus leucolaemus
- Yellow-throated woodpecker, Piculus flavigula
- Golden-green woodpecker, Piculus chrysochloros
- Golden-olive woodpecker, Colaptes rubiginosus
- Crimson-mantled woodpecker, Colaptes rivolii
- Spot-breasted woodpecker, Colaptes punctigula
- Green-barred woodpecker, Colaptes melanochloros
- Andean flicker, Colaptes rupicola
- Campo flicker, Colaptes campestris

== Seriemas ==
Order: Cariamiformes Family: Cariamidae

The seriemas are terrestrial birds which run rather than fly (though they are able to fly for short distances). They have long legs, necks, and tails, but only short wings, reflecting their way of life. They are brownish birds with short bills and erectile crests and are found on fairly dry open grasslands.

- Red-legged seriema, Cariama cristata
- Black-legged seriema, Chunga burmeisteri

== Falcons ==
Order: Falconiformes Family: Falconidae

Falconidae is a family of diurnal birds of prey. They differ from hawks, eagles, and kites in that they kill with their beaks instead of their talons.

- Laughing falcon, Herpetotheres cachinnans
- Barred forest-falcon, Micrastur ruficollis
- Lined forest-falcon, Micrastur gilvicollis
- Cryptic forest-falcon, Micrastur mintoni
- Slaty-backed forest-falcon, Micrastur mirandollei
- Collared forest-falcon, Micrastur semitorquatus
- Buckley's forest-falcon, Micrastur buckleyi
- Spot-winged falconet, Spiziapteryx circumcincta
- Crested caracara, Caracara plancus
- Red-throated caracara, Ibycter americanus
- Mountain caracara, Phalcoboenus megalopterus
- Black caracara, Daptrius ater
- Yellow-headed caracara, Milvago chimachima
- Chimango caracara, Milvago chimango
- American kestrel, Falco sparverius
- Bat falcon, Falco rufigularis
- Orange-breasted falcon, Falco deiroleucus
- Aplomado falcon, Falco femoralis
- Peregrine falcon, Falco peregrinus

== New World and African parrots ==
Order: Psittaciformes Family: Psittacidae

Parrots are small to large birds with a characteristic curved beak. Their upper mandibles have slight mobility in the joint with the skull and they have a generally erect stance. All parrots are zygodactyl, having the four toes on each foot placed two at the front and two to the back.

- Scarlet-shouldered parrotlet, Touit huetii
- Gray-hooded parakeet, Psilopsiagon aymara
- Mountain parakeet, Psilopsiagon aurifrons
- Barred parakeet, Bolborhynchus lineola
- Andean parakeet, Bolborhynchus orbygnesius
- Amazonian parrotlet, Nannopsittaca dachilleae (U)
- Monk parakeet, Myiopsitta monachus
- Cliff parakeet, Myiopsitta luchsi (E)
- Tui parakeet, Brotogeris sanctithomae
- Yellow-chevroned parakeet, Brotogeris chiriri
- Cobalt-winged parakeet, Brotogeris cyanoptera
- Golden-winged parakeet, Brotogeris chrysoptera
- Black-winged parrot, Hapalopsittaca melanotis
- Orange-cheeked parrot, Pyrilia barrabandi
- Red-billed parrot, Pionus sordidus
- Scaly-headed parrot, Pionus maximiliani
- Speckle-faced parrot, Pionus tumultuosus
- Blue-headed parrot, Pionus menstruus
- Yellow-faced parrot, Alipiopsitta xanthops
- Festive amazon, Amazona festiva (U)
- Tucuman amazon, Amazona tucumana
- Yellow-crowned amazon, Amazona ochrocephala
- Turquoise-fronted amazon, Amazona aestiva
- Mealy amazon, Amazona farinosa
- Orange-winged amazon, Amazona amazonica
- Scaly-naped amazon, Amazona mercenarius
- Dusky-billed parrotlet, Forpus modestus
- Cobalt-rumped parrotlet, Forpus xanthopterygius
- White-bellied parrot, Pionites leucogaster
- Crimson-bellied parakeet, Pyrrhura perlata
- Green-cheeked parakeet, Pyrrhura molinae
- Santarem parakeet, Pyrrhura amazonum (U)
- Bonaparte's parakeet, Pyrrhura lucianii
- Rose-fronted parakeet, Pyrrhura roseifrons
- Black-capped parakeet, Pyrrhura rupicola
- Hyacinth macaw, Anodorhynchus hyacinthinus
- Peach-fronted parakeet, Eupsittula aurea
- Dusky-headed parakeet, Aratinga weddellii
- Nanday parakeet, Aratinga nenday
- Red-bellied macaw, Orthopsittaca manilatus
- Blue-winged macaw, Primolius maracana
- Blue-headed macaw, Primolius couloni
- Yellow-collared macaw, Primolius auricollis
- Blue-and-yellow macaw, Ara ararauna
- Blue-throated macaw, Ara glaucogularis (E)
- Chestnut-fronted macaw, Ara severus
- Red-fronted macaw, Ara rubrogenys (E)
- Military macaw, Ara militaris
- Scarlet macaw, Ara macao
- Red-and-green macaw, Ara chloropterus
- Blue-crowned parakeet, Thectocercus acuticaudatus
- Red-shouldered macaw, Diopsittaca nobilis
- Mitred parakeet, Psittacara mitratus
- White-eyed parakeet, Psittacara leucophthalmus

== Antbirds ==
Order: Passeriformes Family: Thamnophilidae

The antbirds are a large family of small passerine birds of subtropical and tropical Central and South America. They are forest birds which tend to feed on insects at or near the ground. A sizable minority of them specialize in following columns of army ants to eat small invertebrates that leave their hiding places to flee from the ants. Many species lack bright color; brown, black, and white are the dominant tones.

- Chestnut-shouldered antwren, Euchrepomis humeralis
- Yellow-rumped antwren, Euchrepomis sharpei
- Fasciated antshrike, Cymbilaimus lineatus
- Bamboo antshrike, Cymbilaimus sanctaemariae
- Giant antshrike, Batara cinerea
- Undulated antshrike, Frederickena unduliger (U)
- Great antshrike, Taraba major
- Barred antshrike, Thamnophilus doliatus
- Rufous-capped antshrike, Thamnophilus ruficapillus
- Rufous-winged antshrike, Thamnophilus torquatus
- Chestnut-backed antshrike, Thamnophilus palliatus
- Plain-winged antshrike, Thamnophilus schistaceus
- Mouse-colored antshrike, Thamnophilus murinus
- Natterer's slaty-antshrike, Thamnophilus stictocephalus
- Bolivian slaty-antshrike, Thamnophilus sticturus
- Variable antshrike, Thamnophilus caerulescens
- White-shouldered antshrike, Thamnophilus aethiops
- Upland antshrike, Thamnophilus aroyae
- Amazonian antshrike, Thamnophilus amazonicus
- Black bushbird, Neoctantes niger (U)
- Rufescent antshrike, Thamnistes rufescens (U)
- Plain antvireo, Dysithamnus mentalis
- Black-capped antwren, Herpsilochmus atricapillus
- Large-billed antwren, Herpsilochmus longirostris
- Yellow-breasted antwren, Herpsilochmus axillaris
- Rusty-winged antwren, Herpsilochmus rufimarginatus
- Dusky-throated antshrike, Thamnomanes ardesiacus
- Saturnine antshrike, Thamnomanes saturninus
- Cinereous antshrike, Thamnomanes caesius
- Bluish-slate antshrike, Thamnomanes schistogynus
- Plain-throated antwren, Isleria hauxwelli
- Ornate stipplethroat, Epinecrophylla ornata
- White-eyed stipplethroat, Epinecrophylla leucophthalma
- Rio Madeira stipplethroat, Epinecrophylla amazonica
- Pygmy antwren, Myrmotherula brachyura
- Sclater's antwren, Myrmotherula sclateri
- Amazonian streaked-antwren, Myrmotherula multostriata
- Stripe-chested antwren, Myrmotherula longicauda
- White-flanked antwren, Myrmotherula axillaris
- Long-winged antwren, Myrmotherula longipennis
- Ihering's antwren, Myrmotherula iheringi
- Ashy antwren, Myrmotherula grisea
- Gray antwren, Myrmotherula menetriesii
- Leaden antwren, Myrmotherula assimilis
- Banded antbird, Dichrozona cincta
- Stripe-backed antbird, Myrmorchilus strigilatus
- Dot-winged antwren, Microrhopias quixensis
- White-fringed antwren, Formicivora grisea
- Black-bellied antwren, Formicivora melanogaster
- Rusty-backed antwren, Formicivora rufa
- Striated antbird, Drymophila devillei
- Streak-headed antbird, Drymophila striaticeps
- Peruvian warbling-antbird, Hypocnemis peruviana
- Yellow-breasted warbling-antbird, Hypocnemis subflava
- Rondonia warbling-antbird, Hypocnemis ochrogyna
- Black antbird, Cercomacroides serva
- Blackish antbird, Cercomacroides nigrescens
- Riparian antbird, Cercomacroides fuscicauda
- Manu antbird, Cercomacra manu
- Gray antbird, Cercomacra cinerascens
- Mato Grosso antbird, Cercomacra melanaria
- Western fire-eye, Pyriglena maura
- White-browed antbird, Myrmoborus leucophrys
- Black-faced antbird, Myrmoborus myotherinus
- White-lined antbird, Myrmoborus lophotes
- Band-tailed antbird, Hypocnemoides maculicauda
- Black-and-white antbird, Myrmochanes hemileucus (U)
- Silvered antbird, Sclateria naevia
- Plumbeous antbird, Myrmelastes hyperythrus
- Spot-winged antbird, Myrmelastes leucostigma
- Humaita antbird, Myrmelastes humaythae
- Brownish-headed antbird, Myrmelastes brunneiceps
- Chestnut-tailed antbird, Sciaphylax hemimelaena
- Goeldi's antbird, Akletos goeldii
- Sooty antbird, Hafferia fortis
- Black-throated antbird, Myrmophylax atrothorax
- White-throated antbird, Oneillornis salvini
- Hairy-crested antbird, Rhegmatorhina melanosticta
- Spot-backed antbird, Hylophylax naevius
- Dot-backed antbird, Hylophylax punctulatus
- Common scale-backed antbird, Willisornis poecilinotus
- Black-spotted bare-eye, Phlegopsis nigromaculata
- Reddish-winged bare-eye, Phlegopsis erythroptera

== Crescentchests ==
Order: Passeriformes Family: Melanopareiidae

These are smallish birds which inhabit regions of arid scrub. They have a band across the chest which gives them their name.

- Collared crescentchest, Melanopareia torquata
- Olive-crowned crescentchest, Melanopareia maximiliani

== Gnateaters ==
Order: Passeriformes Family: Conopophagidae

The gnateaters are round, short-tailed, and long-legged birds which are closely related to the antbirds.

- Ash-throated gnateater, Conopophaga peruviana
- Slaty gnateater, Conopophaga ardesiaca

== Antpittas ==
Order: Passeriformes Family: Grallariidae

Antpittas resemble the true pittas with strong longish legs, very short tails, and stout bills.

- Undulated antpitta, Grallaria squamigera
- Scaled antpitta, Grallaria guatimalensis
- Stripe-headed antpitta, Grallaria andicolus
- White-throated antpitta, Grallaria albigula
- Bolivian antpitta, Grallaria cochabambae (E)
- Puno antpitta, Grallaria sinaensis
- Rufous-faced antpitta, Grallaria erythrotis
- Ochre-breasted antpitta, Grallaricula flavirostris
- Leymebamba antpitta, Grallaricula leymebambae
- Masked antpitta, Hylopezus auricularis (E)
- Amazonian antpitta, Myrmothera berlepschi
- Thrush-like antpitta, Myrmothera campanisona

== Tapaculos ==
Order: Passeriformes Family: Rhinocryptidae

The tapaculos are small suboscine passeriform birds with numerous species in South and Central America. They are terrestrial species that fly only poorly on their short wings. They have strong legs, well-suited to their habitat of grassland or forest undergrowth. The tail is cocked and pointed towards the head.

- Rusty-belted tapaculo, Liosceles thoracicus
- Crested gallito, Rhinocrypta lanceolata
- Zimmer's tapaculo, Scytalopus zimmeri
- Puna tapaculo, Scytalopus simonsi
- Diademed tapaculo, Scytalopus schulenbergi
- Trilling tapaculo, Scytalopus parvirostris
- Bolivian tapaculo, Scytalopus bolivianus

== Antthrushes ==
Order: Passeriformes Family: Formicariidae

Antthrushes resemble small rails with strong, longish legs, very short tails, and stout bills.

- Rufous-capped antthrush, Formicarius colma
- Black-faced antthrush, Formicarius analis
- Rufous-fronted antthrush, Formicarius rufifrons
- Short-tailed antthrush, Chamaeza campanisona
- Striated antthrush, Chamaeza nobilis
- Barred antthrush, Chamaeza mollissima

== Ovenbirds ==
Order: Passeriformes Family: Furnariidae

Ovenbirds comprise a large family of small sub-oscine passerine bird species found in Central and South America. They are a diverse group of insectivores which gets its name from the elaborate "oven-like" clay nests built by some species, although others build stick nests or nest in tunnels or clefts in rock. The woodcreepers are brownish birds which maintain an upright vertical posture, supported by their stiff tail vanes. They feed mainly on insects taken from tree trunks.

- South American leaftosser, Sclerurus obscurior
- Short-billed leaftosser, Sclerurus rufigularis
- Black-tailed leaftosser, Sclerurus caudacutus
- Gray-throated leaftosser, Sclerurus albigularis
- Slender-billed miner, Geositta tenuirostris
- Common miner, Geositta cunicularia
- Puna miner, Geositta punensis
- Campo miner, Geositta poeciloptera
- Rufous-banded miner, Geositta rufipennis
- Olivaceous woodcreeper, Sittasomus griseicapillus
- Mournful long-tailed woodcreeper, Deconychura pallida
- Tyrannine woodcreeper, Dendrocincla tyrannina
- White-chinned woodcreeper, Dendrocincla merula
- Plain-brown woodcreeper, Dendrocincla fuliginosa
- Wedge-billed woodcreeper, Glyphorynchus spirurus
- Cinnamon-throated woodcreeper, Dendrexetastes rufigula
- Long-billed woodcreeper, Nasica longirostris
- Amazonian barred-woodcreeper, Dendrocolaptes certhia
- Black-banded woodcreeper, Dendrocolaptes picumnus
- Bar-bellied woodcreeper, Hylexetastes stresemanni
- Uniform woodcreeper, Hylexetastes uniformis
- Strong-billed woodcreeper, Xiphocolaptes promeropirhynchus
- Great rufous woodcreeper, Xiphocolaptes major
- Striped woodcreeper, Xiphorhynchus obsoletus
- Ocellated woodcreeper, Xiphorhynchus ocellatus
- Elegant woodcreeper, Xiphorhynchus elegans
- Buff-throated woodcreeper, Xiphorhynchus guttatus
- Olive-backed woodcreeper, Xiphorhynchus triangularis
- Straight-billed woodcreeper, Dendroplex picus
- Red-billed scythebill, Campylorhamphus trochilirostris
- Scimitar-billed woodcreeper, Drymornis bridgesii
- Narrow-billed woodcreeper, Lepidocolaptes angustirostris
- Montane woodcreeper, Lepidocolaptes lacrymiger
- Inambari woodcreeper, Lepidocolaptes fatimalimae
- Dusky-capped woodcreeper, Lepidocolaptes fuscicapillus
- Slender-billed xenops, Xenops tenuirostris
- Amazonian plain-xenops, Xenops genibarbis
- Streaked xenops, Xenops rutilans
- Point-tailed palmcreeper, Berlepschia rikeri
- Rufous-tailed xenops, Microxenops milleri
- Rock earthcreeper, Ochetorhynchus andaecola
- Straight-billed earthcreeper, Ochetorhynchus ruficaudus
- Streaked tuftedcheek, Pseudocolaptes boissonneautii
- Bolivian earthcreeper, Tarphonomus harterti
- Chaco earthcreeper, Tarphonomus certhioides
- Pale-legged hornero, Furnarius leucopus
- Rufous hornero, Furnarius rufus
- Crested hornero, Furnarius cristatus
- Sharp-tailed streamcreeper, Lochmias nematura
- Wren-like rushbird, Phleocryptes melanops
- Scale-throated earthcreeper, Upucerthia dumetaria
- Buff-breasted earthcreeper, Upucerthia validirostris
- Cream-winged cinclodes, Cinclodes albiventris
- Royal cinclodes, Cinclodes aricomae
- White-winged cinclodes, Cinclodes atacamensis
- Dusky-cheeked foliage-gleaner, Anabazenops dorsalis
- Rufous-rumped foliage-gleaner, Neophilydor erythrocercum
- Cinnamon-rumped foliage-gleaner, Philydor pyrrhodes
- Montane foliage-gleaner, Anabacerthia striaticollis
- Rufous-tailed foliage-gleaner, Anabacerthia ruficaudata
- Buff-browed foliage-gleaner, Syndactyla rufosuperciliata
- Peruvian recurvebill, Syndactyla ucayalae
- Bolivian recurvebill, Syndactyla striata
- Chestnut-winged hookbill, Ancistrops strigilatus
- Buff-fronted foliage-gleaner, Dendroma rufa
- Chestnut-winged foliage-gleaner, Dendroma erythroptera
- Ruddy foliage-gleaner, Clibanornis rubiginosus
- Rufous-backed treehunter, Thripadectes scrutator
- Striped treehunter, Thripadectes holostictus
- Chestnut-crowned foliage-gleaner, Automolus rufipileatus
- Brown-rumped foliage-gleaner, Automolus melanopezus
- Buff-throated foliage-gleaner, Automolus ochrolaemus
- Striped woodhaunter, Automolus subulatus
- Olive-backed foliage-gleaner, Automolus infuscatus
- Spotted barbtail, Premnoplex brunnescens
- Pearled treerunner, Margarornis squamiger
- Tawny tit-spinetail, Sylviorthorhynchus yanacensis
- Brown-capped tit-spinetail, Leptasthenura fuliginiceps
- Plain-mantled tit-spinetail, Leptasthenura aegithaloides
- Andean tit-spinetail, Leptasthenura andicola
- Rufous-fronted thornbird, Phacellodomus rufifrons
- Streak-fronted thornbird, Phacellodomus striaticeps
- Little thornbird, Phacellodomus sibilatrix
- Spot-breasted thornbird, Phacellodomus maculipectus
- Greater thornbird, Phacellodomus ruber
- Lark-like brushrunner, Coryphistera alaudina
- Creamy-breasted canastero, Asthenes dorbignyi
- Berlepsch's canastero, Asthenes berlepschi (E)
- Short-billed canastero, Asthenes baeri
- Line-fronted canastero, Asthenes urubambensis
- Scribble-tailed canastero, Asthenes maculicauda
- Streak-backed canastero, Asthenes wyatti
- Puna canastero, Asthenes sclateri
- Streak-throated canastero, Asthenes humilis
- Cordilleran canastero, Asthenes modesta
- Sharp-billed canastero, Asthenes pyrrholeuca
- Black-throated thistletail, Asthenes harterti (E)
- Puna thistletail, Asthenes helleri
- Maquis canastero, Asthenes heterura
- Orange-fronted plushcrown, Metopothrix aurantiaca
- Plain softtail, Thripophaga fusciceps
- Light-crowned spinetail, Cranioleuca albiceps
- Rusty-backed spinetail, Cranioleuca vulpina
- Parker's spinetail, Cranioleuca vulpecula
- Stripe-crowned spinetail, Cranioleuca pyrrhophia
- Bolivian spinetail, Cranioleuca henricae (E)
- Ash-browed spinetail, Cranioleuca curtata
- Speckled spinetail, Cranioleuca gutturata
- Rufous cacholote, Pseudoseisura unirufa
- Brown cacholote, Pseudoseisura lophotes
- Yellow-chinned spinetail, Certhiaxis cinnamomeus
- White-bellied spinetail, Mazaria propinqua
- Chotoy spinetail, Schoeniophylax phryganophilus
- Ochre-cheeked spinetail, Synallaxis scutata
- Sooty-fronted spinetail, Synallaxis frontalis
- Azara's spinetail, Synallaxis azarae
- Pale-breasted spinetail, Synallaxis albescens
- Dark-breasted spinetail, Synallaxis albigularis (U)
- Cinereous-breasted spinetail, Synallaxis hypospodia
- Ruddy spinetail, Synallaxis rutilans
- Chestnut-throated spinetail, Synallaxis cherriei
- Cabanis's spinetail, Synallaxis cabanisi
- Plain-crowned spinetail, Synallaxis gujanensis
- White-lored spinetail, Synallaxis albilora

== Manakins ==
Order: Passeriformes Family: Pipridae

The manakins are a family of subtropical and tropical mainland Central and South America, and Trinidad and Tobago. They are compact forest birds, the males typically being brightly colored, although the females of most species are duller and usually green-plumaged. Manakins feed on small fruits, berries and insects.

- Dwarf tyrant-manakin, Tyranneutes stolzmanni
- Pale-bellied tyrant-manakin, Neopelma pallescens (U)
- Sulphur-bellied tyrant-manakin, Neopelma sulphureiventer
- Jet manakin, Chloropipo unicolor
- Blue-backed manakin, Chiroxiphia pareola
- Yungas manakin, Chiroxiphia boliviana
- Helmeted manakin, Chiroxiphia galeata
- Black manakin, Xenopipo atronitens
- Blue-capped manakin, Lepidothrix coronata
- Snow-capped manakin, Lepidothrix nattereri
- Flame-crowned manakin, Heterocercus linteatus
- White-bearded manakin, Manacus manacus
- Band-tailed manakin, Pipra fasciicauda
- Fiery-capped manakin, Machaeropterus pyrocephalus
- Red-headed manakin, Ceratopipra rubrocapilla
- Round-tailed manakin, Ceratopipra chloromeros

== Cotingas ==
Order: Passeriformes Family: Cotingidae

The cotingas are birds of forests or forest edges in tropical South America. Comparatively little is known about this diverse group, although all have broad bills with hooked tips, rounded wings, and strong legs. The males of many of the species are brightly colored or decorated with plumes or wattles.

- Band-tailed fruiteater, Pipreola intermedia
- Barred fruiteater, Pipreola arcuata
- Scarlet-breasted fruiteater, Pipreola frontalis
- Scaled fruiteater, Ampelioides tschudii
- White-tipped plantcutter, Phytotoma rutila
- Swallow-tailed cotinga, Phibalura flavirostris
- Red-crested cotinga, Ampelion rubrocristatus
- Chestnut-crested cotinga, Ampelion rufaxilla
- Andean cock-of-the-rock, Rupicola peruvianus
- Purple-throated fruitcrow, Querula purpurata
- Amazonian umbrellabird, Cephalopterus ornatus
- Plum-throated cotinga, Cotinga maynana
- Spangled cotinga, Cotinga cayana
- Screaming piha, Lipaugus vociferans
- Scimitar-winged piha, Lipaugus uropygialis
- Purple-throated cotinga, Porphyrolaema porphyrolaema
- Pompadour cotinga, Xipholena punicea
- Bare-necked fruitcrow, Gymnoderus foetidus
- Black-faced cotinga, Conioptilon mcilhennyi

== Tityras ==
Order: Passeriformes Family: Tityridae

Tityridae are suboscine passerine birds found in forest and woodland in the Neotropics. The species in this family were formerly spread over the families Tyrannidae, Pipridae, and Cotingidae. They are small to medium-sized birds. They do not have the sophisticated vocal capabilities of the songbirds. Most, but not all, have plain coloring.

- Black-crowned tityra, Tityra inquisitor
- Black-tailed tityra, Tityra cayana
- Masked tityra, Tityra semifasciata
- Varzea schiffornis, Schiffornis major
- Brown-winged schiffornis, Schiffornis turdina
- Cinereous mourner, Laniocera hypopyrra
- White-browed purpletuft, Iodopleura isabellae
- Shrike-like cotinga, Laniisoma elegans
- White-naped xenopsaris, Xenopsaris albinucha
- Green-backed becard, Pachyramphus viridis
- Barred becard, Pachyramphus versicolor
- Chestnut-crowned becard, Pachyramphus castaneus
- White-winged becard, Pachyramphus polychopterus
- Black-capped becard, Pachyramphus marginatus
- Pink-throated becard, Pachyramphus minor
- Crested becard, Pachyramphus validus

== Sharpbill ==
Order: Passeriformes Family: Oxyruncidae

The sharpbill is a small bird of dense forests in Central and South America. It feeds mostly on fruit but also eats insects.

- Sharpbill, Oxyruncus cristatus

== Royal flycatchers ==
Order: Passeriformes Family: Onychorhynchidae

In 2019 the SACC determined that these species, which were formerly considered tyrant flycatchers, belonged in their own family.

- Tropical royal-flycatcher, Onychorhynchus coronatus
- Ruddy-tailed flycatcher, Terenotriccus erythrurus
- Tawny-breasted flycatcher, Myiobius villosus
- Sulphur-rumped flycatcher, Myiobius barbatus

== Tyrant flycatchers ==
Order: Passeriformes Family: Tyrannidae

Tyrant flycatchers are passerine birds which occur throughout North and South America. They superficially resemble the Old World flycatchers, but are more robust and have stronger bills. They do not have the sophisticated vocal capabilities of the songbirds. Most, but not all, have plain coloring. As the name implies, most are insectivorous.

- Wing-barred piprites, Piprites chloris
- Cinnamon manakin-tyrant, Neopipo cinnamomea
- White-throated spadebill, Platyrinchus mystaceus
- Golden-crowned spadebill, Platyrinchus coronatus
- White-crested spadebill, Platyrinchus platyrhynchos
- Hazel-fronted pygmy-tyrant, Pseudotriccus simplex
- Rufous-headed pygmy-tyrant, Pseudotriccus ruficeps
- Ringed antpipit, Corythopis torquatus
- Southern antpipit, Corythopis delalandi
- Marble-faced bristle-tyrant, Pogonotriccus ophthalmicus
- Spectacled bristle-tyrant, Pogonotriccus orbitalis
- Mottle-cheeked tyrannulet, Phylloscartes ventralis
- Cinnamon-faced tyrannulet, Phylloscartes parkeri
- Streak-necked flycatcher, Mionectes striaticollis
- Olive-striped flycatcher, Mionectes olivaceus
- Ochre-bellied flycatcher, Mionectes oleagineus
- McConnell's flycatcher, Mionectes macconnelli
- Sepia-capped flycatcher, Leptopogon amaurocephalus
- Slaty-capped flycatcher, Leptopogon superciliaris
- Brownish twistwing, Cnipodectes subbrunneus
- Rufous twistwing, Cnipodectes superrufus
- Olivaceous flatbill, Rhynchocyclus olivaceus
- Fulvous-breasted flatbill, Rhynchocyclus fulvipectus
- Yellow-margined flatbill, Tolmomyias assimilis
- Gray-crowned flatbill, Tolmomyias poliocephalus
- Yellow-breasted flatbill, Tolmomyias flaviventris
- Olive-faced flatbill, Tolmomyias viridiceps
- Yellow-olive flatbill, Tolmomyias sulphurescens
- White-bellied pygmy-tyrant, Myiornis albiventris
- Short-tailed pygmy-tyrant, Myiornis ecaudatus
- Long-crested pygmy-tyrant, Lophotriccus eulophotes
- Snethlage's tody-tyrant, Hemitriccus minor
- Acre tody-tyrant, Hemitriccus cohnhafti
- Yungas tody-tyrant, Hemitriccus spodiops
- Flammulated pygmy-tyrant, Hemitriccus flammulatus
- White-bellied tody-tyrant, Hemitriccus griseipectus
- Johannes's tody-tyrant, Hemitriccus iohannis
- Stripe-necked tody-tyrant, Hemitriccus striaticollis
- Pearly-vented tody-tyrant, Hemitriccus margaritaceiventer
- Zimmer's tody-tyrant, Hemitriccus minimus
- Black-throated tody-tyrant, Hemitriccus granadensis
- Buff-throated tody-tyrant, Hemitriccus rufigularis
- White-cheeked tody-flycatcher, Poecilotriccus albifacies
- Ochre-faced tody-flycatcher, Poecilotriccus plumbeiceps
- Rusty-fronted tody-flycatcher, Poecilotriccus latirostris
- Spotted tody-flycatcher, Todirostrum maculatum
- Common tody-flycatcher, Todirostrum cinereum
- Yellow-browed tody-flycatcher, Todirostrum chrysocrotaphum
- Handsome flycatcher, Nephelomyias pulcher (U)
- Ochraceous-breasted flycatcher, Nephelomyias ochraceiventris
- Cliff flycatcher, Hirundinea ferruginea
- Cinnamon flycatcher, Pyrrhomyias cinnamomeus
- Bolivian tyrannulet, Zimmerius bolivianus
- Red-billed tyrannulet, Zimmerius cinereicapilla
- Slender-footed tyrannulet, Zimmerius gracilipes
- Greater wagtail-tyrant, Stigmatura budytoides
- Plain tyrannulet, Inezia inornata
- Amazonian tyrannulet, Inezia subflava
- Fulvous-crowned scrub-tyrant, Euscarthmus meloryphus
- Rufous-sided scrub-tyrant, Euscarthmus rufomarginatus
- Yellow-bellied elaenia, Elaenia flavogaster
- Large elaenia, Elaenia spectabilis
- White-crested elaenia, Elaenia albiceps
- Small-billed elaenia, Elaenia parvirostris
- Slaty elaenia, Elaenia strepera
- Mottle-backed elaenia, Elaenia gigas
- Brownish elaenia, Elaenia pelzelni
- Plain-crested elaenia, Elaenia cristata
- Lesser elaenia, Elaenia chiriquensis
- Highland elaenia, Elaenia obscura
- Sierran elaenia, Elaenia pallatangae
- Yellow-crowned tyrannulet, Tyrannulus elatus
- Forest elaenia, Myiopagis gaimardii
- Gray elaenia, Myiopagis caniceps
- Greenish elaenia, Myiopagis viridicata
- Suiriri flycatcher, Suiriri suiriri
- Yellow tyrannulet, Capsiempis flaveola
- Buff-banded tyrannulet, Mecocerculus hellmayri
- White-banded tyrannulet, Mecocerculus stictopterus
- White-throated tyrannulet, Mecocerculus leucophrys
- Sclater's tyrannulet, Phyllomyias sclateri
- Yungas tyrannulet, Phyllomyias weedeni
- Planalto tyrannulet, Phyllomyias fasciatus (U)
- White-fronted tyrannulet, Acrochordopus zeledoni
- Rough-legged tyrannulet, Acrochordopus burmeisteri
- Tawny-rumped tyrannulet, Tyranniscus uropygialis
- Southeastern beardless-tyrannulet, Camptostoma obsoletum
- White-lored tyrannulet, Ornithion inerme
- Mouse-colored tyrannulet, Nesotriccus murinus (see note) (Note: The SACC has split Nesotriccus maranonicus from Nesotriccus murinus (Proposal 956) but has not assigned English names, so the proposal has not been implemented and the counts do not reflect the change.)
- Ash-breasted tit-tyrant, Anairetes alpinus
- Yellow-billed tit-tyrant, Anairetes flavirostris
- Tufted tit-tyrant, Anairetes parulus
- Bearded tachuri, Polystictus pectoralis
- Sharp-tailed tyrant, Culicivora caudacuta
- Crested doradito, Pseudocolopteryx sclateri
- Subtropical doradito, Pseudocolopteryx acutipennis
- Dinelli's doradito, Pseudocolopteryx dinelliana
- Ticking doradito, Pseudocolopteryx citreola
- Torrent tyrannulet, Serpophaga cinerea
- River tyrannulet, Serpophaga hypoleuca
- Sooty tyrannulet, Serpophaga nigricans
- White-crested tyrannulet, Serpophaga subcristata
- Straneck's tyrannulet, Serpophaga griseicapilla
- Rufous-tailed attila, Attila phoenicurus (U)
- Cinnamon attila, Attila cinnamomeus
- Citron-bellied attila, Attila citriniventris
- Dull-capped attila, Attila bolivianus
- Bright-rumped attila, Attila spadiceus
- Piratic flycatcher, Legatus leucophaius
- Large-headed flatbill, Ramphotrigon megacephalum
- Rufous-tailed flatbill, Ramphotrigon ruficauda
- Dusky-tailed flatbill, Ramphotrigon fuscicauda
- Great kiskadee, Pitangus sulphuratus
- Lesser kiskadee, Philohydor lictor
- Cattle tyrant, Machetornis rixosa
- Sulphury flycatcher, Tyrannopsis sulphurea
- Boat-billed flycatcher, Megarynchus pitangua
- Golden-crowned flycatcher, Myiodynastes chrysocephalus
- Sulphur-bellied flycatcher, Myiodynastes luteiventris
- Streaked flycatcher, Myiodynastes maculatus
- Rusty-margined flycatcher, Myiozetetes cayanensis
- Social flycatcher, Myiozetetes similis
- Gray-capped flycatcher, Myiozetetes granadensis
- Dusky-chested flycatcher, Myiozetetes luteiventris
- Yellow-throated flycatcher, Conopias parvus
- Three-striped flycatcher, Conopias trivirgatus
- Lemon-browed flycatcher, Conopias cinchoneti (U)
- Variegated flycatcher, Empidonomus varius
- Crowned slaty flycatcher, Empidonomus aurantioatrocristatus
- White-throated kingbird, Tyrannus albogularis
- Tropical kingbird, Tyrannus melancholicus
- Fork-tailed flycatcher, Tyrannus savana
- Eastern kingbird, Tyrannus tyrannus
- Grayish mourner, Rhytipterna simplex
- Pale-bellied mourner, Rhytipterna immunda
- Rufous casiornis, Casiornis rufus
- White-rumped sirystes, Sirystes albocinereus
- Sibilant sirystes, Sirystes sibilator
- Dusky-capped flycatcher, Myiarchus tuberculifer
- Swainson's flycatcher, Myiarchus swainsoni
- Short-crested flycatcher, Myiarchus ferox
- Pale-edged flycatcher, Myiarchus cephalotes
- Brown-crested flycatcher, Myiarchus tyrannulus
- Long-tailed tyrant, Colonia colonus
- Unadorned flycatcher, Myiophobus inornatus
- Roraiman flycatcher, Myiophobus roraimae (U)
- Bran-colored flycatcher, Myiophobus fasciatus
- Crowned chat-tyrant, Silvicultrix frontalis
- Jelski's chat-tyrant, Silvicultrix jelskii
- Slaty-backed chat-tyrant, Ochthoeca cinnamomeiventris
- Rufous-breasted chat-tyrant, Ochthoeca rufipectoralis
- Brown-backed chat-tyrant, Ochthoeca fumicolor
- d'Orbigny's chat-tyrant, Ochthoeca oenanthoides
- White-browed chat-tyrant, Ochthoeca leucophrys
- Chapada flycatcher, Guyramemua affine
- Amazonian scrub-flycatcher, Sublegatus obscurior
- Southern scrub-flycatcher, Sublegatus modestus
- Vermilion flycatcher, Pyrocephalus rubinus
- Black-backed water-tyrant, Fluvicola albiventer
- White-headed marsh tyrant, Arundinicola leucocephala
- Streamer-tailed tyrant, Gubernetes yetapa
- Cock-tailed tyrant, Alectrurus tricolor
- Austral negrito, Lessonia rufa
- Andean negrito, Lessonia oreas
- Spectacled tyrant, Hymenops perspicillatus
- Rufous-tailed tyrant, Knipolegus poecilurus (U)
- Plumbeous black-tyrant, Knipolegus cabanisi
- Cinereous tyrant, Knipolegus striaticeps
- White-winged black-tyrant, Knipolegus aterrimus
- Hudson's black-tyrant, Knipolegus hudsoni
- Yellow-browed tyrant, Satrapa icterophrys
- Little ground-tyrant, Muscisaxicola fluviatilis
- Spot-billed ground-tyrant, Muscisaxicola maculirostris
- Taczanowski's ground-tyrant, Muscisaxicola griseus
- Puna ground-tyrant, Muscisaxicola juninensis
- Cinereous ground-tyrant, Muscisaxicola cinereus
- White-fronted ground-tyrant, Muscisaxicola albifrons
- Ochre-naped ground-tyrant, Muscisaxicola flavinucha
- Rufous-naped ground-tyrant, Muscisaxicola rufivertex
- White-browed ground-tyrant, Muscisaxicola albilora
- Cinnamon-bellied ground-tyrant, Muscisaxicola capistratus
- Black-fronted ground-tyrant, Muscisaxicola frontalis
- Red-rumped bush-tyrant, Cnemarchus erythropygius
- Rufous-webbed bush-tyrant, Cnemarchus rufipennis
- White-rumped monjita, Xolmis velatus
- White monjita, Xolmis irupero
- Gray monjita, Nengetus cinereus
- Black-crowned monjita, Neoxolmis coronatus
- Black-billed shrike-tyrant, Agriornis montanus
- White-tailed shrike-tyrant, Agriornis albicauda
- Gray-bellied shrike-tyrant, Agriornis micropterus
- Lesser shrike-tyrant, Agriornis murinus
- Streak-throated bush-tyrant, Myiotheretes striaticollis
- Rufous-bellied bush-tyrant, Myiotheretes fuscorufus
- Drab water tyrant, Ochthornis littoralis
- Fuscous flycatcher, Cnemotriccus fuscatus
- Euler's flycatcher, Lathrotriccus euleri
- Olive flycatcher, Mitrephanes olivaceus
- Black phoebe, Sayornis nigricans
- Alder flycatcher, Empidonax alnorum
- Olive-sided flycatcher, Contopus cooperi
- Smoke-colored pewee, Contopus fumigatus
- Western wood-pewee, Contopus sordidulus
- Eastern wood-pewee, Contopus virens
- Tropical pewee, Contopus cinereus
- Many-colored rush tyrant, Tachuris rubrigastra

== Vireos ==
Order: Passeriformes Family: Vireonidae

The vireos are a group of small to medium-sized passerine birds. They are typically greenish in color and resemble wood warblers apart from their heavier bills.

- Rufous-browed peppershrike, Cyclarhis gujanensis
- Gray-eyed greenlet, Hylophilus amaurocephalus (U)
- Rufous-crowned greenlet, Hylophilus poicilotis (U)
- Ashy-headed greenlet, Hylophilus pectoralis
- Gray-chested greenlet, Hylophilus semicinereus
- Lemon-chested greenlet, Hylophilus thoracicus
- Slaty-capped shrike-vireo, Vireolanius leucotis
- Rufous-fronted brownlet, Tunchiornis ferrugineifrons
- Dusky-capped greenlet, Pachysylvia hypoxantha
- Buff-cheeked greenlet, Pachysylvia muscicapina
- Brown-capped vireo, Vireo leucophrys
- Red-eyed vireo, Vireo olivaceus
- Chivi vireo, Vireo chivi
- Yellow-green vireo, Vireo flavoviridis

== Jays ==
Order: Passeriformes Family: Corvidae

The family Corvidae includes crows, ravens, jays, choughs, magpies, treepies, nutcrackers, and ground jays. Corvids are above average in size among the Passeriformes, and some of the larger species show high levels of intelligence.

- White-collared jay, Cyanolyca viridicyana
- Violaceous jay, Cyanocorax violaceus
- Purplish jay, Cyanocorax cyanomelas
- Curl-crested jay, Cyanocorax cristatellus
- Plush-crested jay, Cyanocorax chrysops
- Green jay, Cyanocorax yncas

== Swallows ==
Order: Passeriformes Family: Hirundinidae

The family Hirundinidae is adapted to aerial feeding. They have a slender streamlined body, long pointed wings, and a short bill with a wide gape. The feet are adapted to perching rather than walking, and the front toes are partially joined at the base.

- Blue-and-white swallow, Pygochelidon cyanoleuca
- Black-collared swallow, Pygochelidon melanoleuca
- Tawny-headed swallow, Alopochelidon fucata
- Brown-bellied swallow, Orochelidon murina
- Pale-footed swallow, Orochelidon flavipes
- Andean swallow, Orochelidon andecola
- White-banded swallow, Atticora fasciata
- White-thighed swallow, Atticora tibialis
- Southern rough-winged swallow, Stelgidopteryx ruficollis
- Brown-chested martin, Progne tapera
- Purple martin, Progne subis
- Gray-breasted martin, Progne chalybea
- Southern martin, Progne elegans
- White-winged swallow, Tachycineta albiventer
- White-rumped swallow, Tachycineta leucorrhoa
- Chilean swallow, Tachycineta leucopyga (V)
- Bank swallow, Riparia riparia
- Barn swallow, Hirundo rustica
- Cliff swallow, Petrochelidon pyrrhonota

== Wrens ==
Order: Passeriformes Family: Troglodytidae

The wrens are mainly small and inconspicuous except for their loud songs. These birds have short wings and thin down-turned bills. Several species often hold their tails upright. All are insectivorous.

- Scaly-breasted wren, Microcerculus marginatus
- Gray-mantled wren, Odontorchilus branickii
- Tooth-billed wren, Odontorchilus cinereus
- Southern house-wren, Troglodytes musculus
- Mountain wren, Troglodytes solstitialis
- Grass wren, Cistothorus platensis
- Thrush-like wren, Campylorhynchus turdinus
- Moustached wren, Pheugopedius genibarbis
- Buff-breasted wren, Cantorchilus leucotis
- Fawn-breasted wren, Cantorchilus guarayanus
- Fulvous wren, Cinnycerthia fulva
- Gray-breasted wood-wren, Henicorhina leucophrys
- Chestnut-breasted wren, Cyphorhinus thoracicus
- Musician wren, Cyphorhinus arada

== Gnatcatchers ==
Order: Passeriformes Family: Polioptilidae

These dainty birds resemble Old World warblers in their build and habits, moving restlessly through the foliage seeking insects. The gnatcatchers and gnatwrens are mainly soft bluish gray in color and have the typical insectivore's long sharp bill. They are birds of fairly open woodland or scrub, which nest in bushes or trees.

- Half-collared gnatwren, Microbates cinereiventris
- Trilling gnatwren, Ramphocaenus melanurus
- Chattering gnatwren, Ramphocaenus sticturus
- Masked gnatcatcher, Polioptila dumicola

== Donacobius ==
Order: Passeriformes Family: Donacobiidae

The black-capped donacobius is found in wet habitats from Panama across northern South America and east of the Andes to Argentina and Paraguay.

- Black-capped donacobius, Donacobius atricapilla

== Dippers ==
Order: Passeriformes Family: Cinclidae

Dippers are a group of perching birds whose habitat includes aquatic environments in the Americas, Europe, and Asia. They are named for their bobbing or dipping movements.

- White-capped dipper, Cinclus leucocephalus
- Rufous-throated dipper, Cinclus schulzii

== Thrushes ==
Order: Passeriformes Family: Turdidae

The thrushes are a group of passerine birds that occur mainly in the Old World. They are plump, soft plumaged, small to medium-sized insectivores or sometimes omnivores, often feeding on the ground. Many have attractive songs.

- Andean solitaire, Myadestes ralloides
- Slaty-backed nightingale-thrush, Catharus fuscater
- Speckled nightingale-thrush, Catharus maculatus
- Veery, Catharus fuscescens
- Swainson's thrush, Catharus ustulatus
- White-eared solitaire, Entomodestes leucotis
- Pale-eyed thrush, Turdus leucops
- Pale-breasted thrush, Turdus leucomelas
- Hauxwell's thrush, Turdus hauxwelli
- Rufous-bellied thrush, Turdus rufiventris
- Unicolored thrush, Turdus haplochrous (E)
- Lawrence's thrush, Turdus lawrencii
- Creamy-bellied thrush, Turdus amaurochalinus
- Black-billed thrush, Turdus ignobilis
- Campina thrush, Turdus arthuri
- Andean slaty thrush, Turdus nigriceps
- Great thrush, Turdus fuscater
- Chiguanco thrush, Turdus chiguanco
- Glossy-black thrush, Turdus serranus
- Rusty-flanked thrush, Turdus albicollis

== Mockingbirds ==
Order: Passeriformes Family: Mimidae

The mimids are a family of passerine birds that includes thrashers, mockingbirds, tremblers, and the New World catbirds. These birds are notable for their vocalizations, especially their ability to mimic a wide variety of birds and other sounds heard outdoors. Their coloring tends towards dull grays and browns.

- Patagonian mockingbird, Mimus patagonicus (U)
- Chalk-browed mockingbird, Mimus saturninus
- White-banded mockingbird, Mimus triurus
- Brown-backed mockingbird, Mimus dorsalis

== Old World sparrows ==
Order: Passeriformes Family: Passeridae

Sparrows are small passerine birds. In general, sparrows tend to be small, plump, brown or gray birds with short tails and short powerful beaks. Sparrows are seed eaters, but they also consume small insects.

- House sparrow, Passer domesticus (I)

== Pipits and wagtails ==
Order: Passeriformes Family: Motacillidae

Motacillidae is a family of small passerine birds with medium to long tails. They include the wagtails, longclaws, and pipits. They are slender ground-feeding insectivores of open country.

- Yellowish pipit, Anthus chii
- Short-billed pipit, Anthus furcatus
- Correndera pipit, Anthus correndera
- Hellmayr's pipit, Anthus hellmayri
- Paramo pipit, Anthus bogotensis

== Finches ==
Order: Passeriformes Family: Fringillidae

Finches are seed-eating passerine birds that are small to moderately large and have a strong beak, usually conical and in some species very large. All have twelve tail feathers and nine primaries. These birds have a bouncing flight with alternating bouts of flapping and gliding on closed wings, and most sing well.

- Thick-billed siskin, Spinus crassirostris
- Hooded siskin, Spinus magellanicus
- Olivaceous siskin, Spinus olivaceus
- Yellow-bellied siskin, Spinus xanthogastrus
- Black siskin, Spinus atratus
- Yellow-rumped siskin, Spinus uropygialis
- Golden-rumped euphonia, Chlorophonia cyanocephala
- Blue-naped chlorophonia, Chlorophonia cyanea
- Purple-throated euphonia, Euphonia chlorotica
- Golden-bellied euphonia, Euphonia chrysopasta
- White-vented euphonia, Euphonia minuta
- Thick-billed euphonia, Euphonia laniirostris
- Orange-bellied euphonia, Euphonia xanthogaster
- Bronze-green euphonia, Euphonia mesochrysa
- Rufous-bellied euphonia, Euphonia rufiventris

== Sparrows ==
Order: Passeriformes Family: Passerellidae

Most of the species are known as sparrows, but these birds are not closely related to the Old World sparrows which are in the family Passeridae. Many of these have distinctive head patterns.

- Short-billed chlorospingus, Chlorospingus parvirostris
- Common chlorospingus, Chlorospingus flavopectus
- Chaco sparrow, Rhynchospiza strigiceps
- Grassland sparrow, Ammodramus humeralis
- Yellow-browed sparrow, Ammodramus aurifrons
- White-browed brushfinch, Arremon torquatus
- Pectoral sparrow, Arremon taciturnus
- Moss-backed sparrow, Arremon dorbignii
- Saffron-billed sparrow, Arremon flavirostris
- Rufous-collared sparrow, Zonotrichia capensis
- Black-faced brushfinch, Atlapetes melanolaemus
- Bolivian brushfinch, Atlapetes rufinucha (E)
- Fulvous-headed brushfinch, Atlapetes fulviceps

== Blackbirds ==
Order: Passeriformes Family: Icteridae

The icterids are a group of small to medium-sized, often colorful, passerine birds restricted to the New World and include the grackles, New World blackbirds, and New World orioles. Most species have black as the predominant plumage color, often enlivened by yellow, orange, or red.

- Bobolink, Dolichonyx oryzivorus
- Red-breasted meadowlark, Leistes militaris
- White-browed meadowlark, Leistes superciliaris
- Yellow-billed cacique, Amblycercus holosericeus
- Russet-backed oropendola, Psarocolius angustifrons
- Dusky-green oropendola, Psarocolius atrovirens
- Green oropendola, Psarocolius viridis
- Crested oropendola, Psarocolius decumanus
- Olive oropendola, Psarocolius bifasciatus
- Solitary black cacique, Cacicus solitarius
- Golden-winged cacique, Cacicus chrysopterus
- Yellow-rumped cacique, Cacicus cela
- Mountain cacique, Cacicus chrysonotus
- Red-rumped cacique, Cacicus haemorrhous
- Casqued cacique, Cacicus oseryi (U)
- Orange-backed troupial, Icterus croconotus
- Epaulet oriole, Icterus cayanensis
- Variable oriole, Icterus pyrrhopterus
- Screaming cowbird, Molothrus rufoaxillaris
- Giant cowbird, Molothrus oryzivorus
- Shiny cowbird, Molothrus bonariensis
- Velvet-fronted grackle, Lampropsar tanagrinus
- Scarlet-headed blackbird, Amblyramphus holosericeus
- Chopi blackbird, Gnorimopsar chopi
- Grayish baywing, Agelaioides badius
- Bolivian blackbird, Oreopsar bolivianus (E)
- Unicolored blackbird, Agelasticus cyanopus
- Yellow-winged blackbird, Agelasticus thilius
- Chestnut-capped blackbird, Chrysomus ruficapillus

== Wood-warblers ==
Order: Passeriformes Family: Parulidae

The wood-warblers are a group of small, often colorful, passerine birds restricted to the New World. Most are arboreal, but some are terrestrial. Most members of this family are insectivores.

- Black-and-white warbler, Mniotilta varia (U)
- Connecticut warbler, Oporornis agilis
- Masked yellowthroat, Geothlypis aequinoctialis
- Cerulean warbler, Setophaga cerulea
- Tropical parula, Setophaga pitiayumi
- Blackburnian warbler, Setophaga fusca (U)
- Yellow warbler, Setophaga petechia (U)
- Blackpoll warbler, Setophaga striata (U)
- Citrine warbler, Myiothlypis luteoviridis
- Flavescent warbler, Myiothlypis flaveola
- Pale-legged warbler, Myiothlypis signata
- Buff-rumped warbler, Myiothlypis fulvicauda
- Riverbank warbler, Myiothlypis rivularis
- Two-banded warbler, Myiothlypis bivittata
- Golden-bellied warbler, Myiothlypis chrysogaster
- Russet-crowned warbler, Myiothlypis coronata
- Golden-crowned warbler, Basileuterus culicivorus
- Three-striped warbler, Basileuterus tristriatus
- Canada warbler, Cardellina canadensis (V)
- Slate-throated whitestart, Myioborus miniatus
- Brown-capped whitestart, Myioborus brunniceps
- Spectacled whitestart, Myioborus melanocephalus

== Mitrospingids ==
Order: Passeriformes Family: Mitrospingidae

Until 2017 the four species in this family were included in the family Thraupidae, the "true" tanagers.

- Red-billed pied tanager, Lamprospiza melanoleuca

== Cardinal grosbeaks ==
Order: Passeriformes Family: Cardinalidae

The cardinals are a family of robust, seed-eating birds with strong bills. They are typically associated with open woodland. The sexes usually have distinct plumages.

- Hepatic tanager, Piranga flava
- Summer tanager, Piranga rubra
- Scarlet tanager, Piranga olivacea
- White-winged tanager, Piranga leucoptera
- Red-crowned ant-tanager, Habia rubica
- Yellow-lored tanager, Chlorothraupis frenata
- Black-backed grosbeak, Pheucticus aureoventris
- Rose-breasted chat, Granatellus pelzelni
- Amazonian grosbeak, Cyanoloxia rothschildii
- Ultramarine grosbeak, Cyanoloxia brissonii

== Tanagers ==
Order: Passeriformes Family: Thraupidae

The tanagers are a large group of small to medium-sized passerine birds restricted to the New World, mainly in the tropics. Many species are brightly colored. As a family they are omnivorous, but individual species specialize in eating fruits, seeds, insects, or other types of food. Most have short, rounded wings.

- Hooded tanager, Nemosia pileata
- Yellow-shouldered grosbeak, Parkerthraustes humeralis
- Plushcap, Catamblyrhynchus diadema
- Green honeycreeper, Chlorophanes spiza
- Guira tanager, Hemithraupis guira
- Yellow-backed tanager, Hemithraupis flavicollis
- Pearly-breasted conebill, Conirostrum margaritae
- Chestnut-vented conebill, Conirostrum speciosum
- Giant conebill, Conirostrum binghami
- White-browed conebill, Conirostrum ferrugineiventre
- Blue-backed conebill, Conirostrum sitticolor
- Capped conebill, Conirostrum albifrons
- Cinereous conebill, Conirostrum cinereum
- Stripe-tailed yellow-finch, Sicalis citrina
- Puna yellow-finch, Sicalis lutea
- Bright-rumped yellow-finch, Sicalis uropygialis
- Citron-headed yellow-finch, Sicalis luteocephala
- Greenish yellow-finch, Sicalis olivascens
- Saffron finch, Sicalis flaveola
- Grassland yellow-finch, Sicalis luteola
- Black-hooded sierra finch, Phrygilus atriceps
- Peruvian sierra finch, Phrygilus punensis
- Plumbeous sierra finch, Geospizopsis unicolor
- Ash-breasted sierra finch, Geospizopsis plebejus
- Mourning sierra finch, Rhopospina fruticeti
- Band-tailed sierra finch, Rhopospina alaudina
- Blue finch, Rhopospina caerulescens
- Red-backed sierra finch, Idiopsar dorsalis
- White-throated sierra finch, Idiopsar erythronotus
- Glacier finch, Idiopsar speculifer
- Boulder finch, Idiopsar brachyurus
- Band-tailed seedeater, Catamenia analis
- Plain-colored seedeater, Catamenia inornata
- Paramo seedeater, Catamenia homochroa
- Moustached flowerpiercer, Diglossa mystacalis
- Black-throated flowerpiercer, Diglossa brunneiventris
- Gray-bellied flowerpiercer, Diglossa carbonaria (E)
- Rusty flowerpiercer, Diglossa sittoides
- Deep-blue flowerpiercer, Diglossa glauca
- Bluish flowerpiercer, Diglossa caerulescens
- Whistling masked-flowerpiercer, Diglossa melanopis
- Slaty finch, Haplospiza rustica
- Blue-black grassquit, Volatinia jacarina
- Black-and-white tanager, Conothraupis speculigera (U)
- Slaty tanager, Creurgops dentatus
- Flame-crested tanager, Loriotus cristatus
- Yellow-crested tanager, Loriotus rufiventer
- White-shouldered tanager, Loriotus luctuosus
- White-lined tanager, Tachyphonus rufus
- Red-shouldered tanager, Tachyphonus phoenicius
- Gray-headed tanager, Eucometis penicillata
- Black-goggled tanager, Trichothraupis melanops
- Inti tanager, Heliothraupis oneilli
- Pileated finch, Coryphospingus pileatus (U)
- Red-crested finch, Coryphospingus cucullatus
- Masked crimson tanager, Ramphocelus nigrogularis (U)
- Silver-beaked tanager, Ramphocelus carbo
- White-winged shrike-tanager, Lanio versicolor
- Coal-crested finch, Charitospiza eucosma
- Short-billed honeycreeper, Cyanerpes nitidus
- Purple honeycreeper, Cyanerpes caeruleus
- Red-legged honeycreeper, Cyanerpes cyaneus
- Swallow tanager, Tersina viridis
- Black-faced dacnis, Dacnis lineata
- Yellow-bellied dacnis, Dacnis flaviventer
- Blue dacnis, Dacnis cayana
- Lesson's seedeater, Sporophila bouvronides
- Lined seedeater, Sporophila lineola
- White-bellied seedeater, Sporophila leucoptera
- Chestnut-bellied seedeater, Sporophila castaneiventris
- Black-and-tawny seedeater, Sporophila nigrorufa
- Pearly-bellied seedeater, Sporophila pileata (U)
- Tawny-bellied seedeater, Sporophila hypoxantha
- Ibera seedeater, Sporophila iberaensis (V)
- Dark-throated seedeater, Sporophila ruficollis
- Rufous-rumped seedeater, Sporophila hypochroma
- Chestnut-bellied seed-finch, Sporophila angolensis
- Great-billed seed-finch, Sporophila maximiliani
- Large-billed seed-finch, Sporophila crassirostris
- Black-billed seed-finch, Sporophila atrirostris
- Wing-barred seedeater, Sporophila americana
- Black-and-white seedeater, Sporophila luctuosa
- Yellow-bellied seedeater, Sporophila nigricollis
- Double-collared seedeater, Sporophila caerulescens
- Slate-colored seedeater, Sporophila schistacea
- Plumbeous seedeater, Sporophila plumbea
- Rusty-collared seedeater, Sporophila collaris
- Many-colored chaco finch, Saltatricula multicolor
- Black-throated saltator, Saltatricula atricollis
- Buff-throated saltator, Saltator maximus
- Bluish-gray saltator, Saltator coerulescens
- Green-winged saltator, Saltator similis
- Golden-billed saltator, Saltator aurantiirostris
- Slate-colored grosbeak, Saltator grossus
- Black-masked finch, Coryphaspiza melanotis
- Great Pampa-finch, Embernagra platensis
- Wedge-tailed grass-finch, Emberizoides herbicola
- Drab hemispingus, Pseudospingus xanthophthalmus
- Black-billed cnemoscopus, Cnemoscopus chrysogaster (U)
- Bolivian warbling finch, Poospiza boliviana
- Black-and-chestnut warbling finch, Poospiza whitii
- Cochabamba mountain finch, Poospiza garleppi (E)
- Tucuman mountain finch, Poospiza baeri (U)
- Rufous-sided warbling finch, Poospizopsis hypochondria
- Orange-browed hemispingus, Kleinothraupis calophrys
- Black-eared hemispingus, Sphenopsis melanotis
- Orange-headed tanager, Thlypopsis sordida
- Rust-and-yellow tanager, Thlypopsis ruficeps
- Superciliaried hemispingus, Thlypopsis superciliaris
- Rusty-browed warbling finch, Microspingus erythrophrys
- Three-striped hemispingus, Microspingus trifasciatus
- Ringed warbling finch, Microspingus torquatus
- Black-capped warbling finch, Microspingus melanoleucus
- White-rumped tanager, Cypsnagra hirundinacea
- Long-tailed reed finch, Donacospiza albifrons
- Bananaquit, Coereba flaveola
- Dull-colored grassquit, Asemospiza obscura
- Sooty grassquit, Asemospiza fuliginosa (V)
- Orange-eared tanager, Chlorochrysa calliparaea
- Black-crested finch, Lophospingus pusillus
- Gray-crested finch, Lophospingus griseocristatus
- White-banded tanager, Neothraupis fasciata
- Diuca finch, Diuca diuca
- Red-crested cardinal, Paroaria coronata
- Red-capped cardinal, Paroaria gularis
- Yellow-billed cardinal, Paroaria capitata
- Black-faced tanager, Schistochlamys melanopis
- Magpie tanager, Cissopis leverianus
- Golden-collared tanager, Iridosornis jelskii
- Fawn-breasted tanager, Pipraeidea melanonota
- Blue-and-yellow tanager, Rauenia bonariensis
- Rufous-bellied mountain tanager, Pseudosaltator rufiventris
- Chestnut-bellied mountain tanager, Dubusia castaneoventris
- Scarlet-bellied mountain tanager, Anisognathus igniventris
- Blue-winged mountain tanager, Anisognathus somptuosus
- Hooded mountain-tanager, Buthraupis montana
- Blue-capped tanager, Sporathraupis cyanocephala
- Grass-green tanager, Chlorornis riefferii
- Golden-naped tanager, Chalcothraupis ruficervix
- Silvery tanager, Stilpnia viridicollis
- Green-throated tanager, Stilpnia argyrofenges
- Green-capped tanager, Stilpnia meyerdeschauenseei
- Burnished-buff tanager, Stilpnia cayana
- Masked tanager, Stilpnia nigrocincta
- Blue-necked tanager, Stilpnia cyanicollis
- Blue-and-black tanager, Tangara vassorii
- Beryl-spangled tanager, Tangara nigroviridis
- Blue-browed tanager, Tangara cyanotis
- Turquoise tanager, Tangara mexicana
- Paradise tanager, Tangara chilensis
- Opal-rumped tanager, Tangara velia
- Opal-crowned tanager, Tangara callophrys
- Bay-headed tanager, Tangara gyrola
- Golden-eared tanager, Tangara chrysotis
- Saffron-crowned tanager, Tangara xanthocephala
- Green-and-gold tanager, Tangara schrankii
- Golden tanager, Tangara arthus
- Blue-gray tanager, Thraupis episcopus
- Sayaca tanager, Thraupis sayaca
- Palm tanager, Thraupis palmarum
- Yellow-bellied tanager, Ixothraupis xanthogastra
- Spotted tanager, Ixothraupis punctata

== See also ==
- List of birds
- Lists of birds by region
