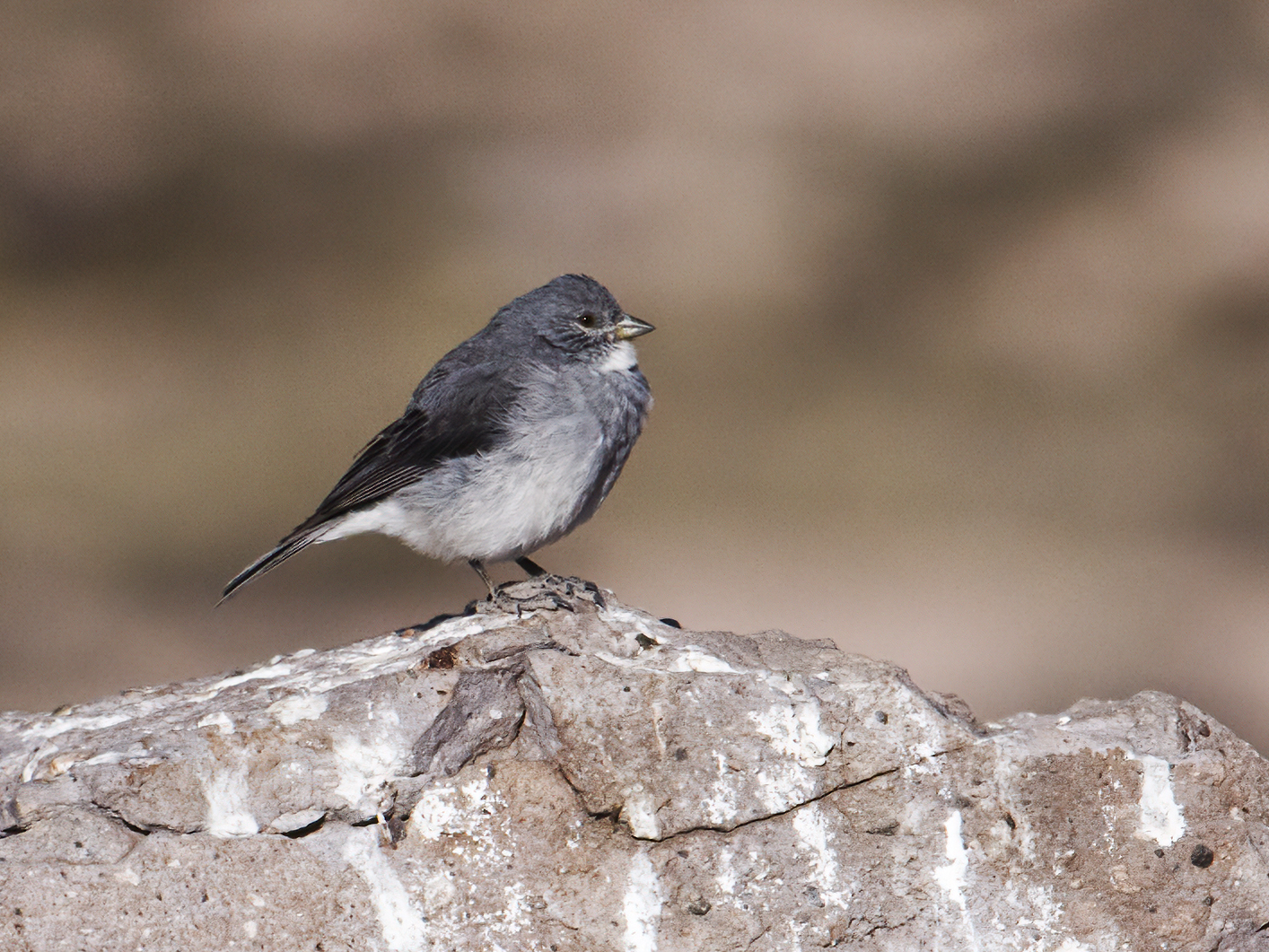

Conservation status
- Least Concern (IUCN 3.1)

Scientific classification
- Kingdom: Animalia
- Phylum: Chordata
- Class: Aves
- Order: Passeriformes
- Family: Thraupidae
- Genus: Idiopsar
- Species: I. erythronotus

Binomial name
- Idiopsar erythronotus (Philippi & Landbeck, 1861)

Synonyms
- Phrygilus erythronotus Ephippiospingus erythronotus

= White-throated sierra finch =

Species of bird

The white-throated sierra finch (Idiopsar erythronotus) is a species of tanager found in high-elevation Puna grassland habitat across the Altiplano of Bolivia, Chile, and Peru.

== Taxonomy and nomenclature ==
The white-throated sierra finch was described as Chlorospiza erythronota by Rodolfo Amando Philippi and Christian Ludwig Landbeck in 1861. The type specimen, an immature (initially identified as an adult), was collected near Putre in modern Parinacota Province, Chile (then Peru). The species was redescribed by Anton Reichenow in 1907, on the basis of an adult male specimen in the Berlin Museum of Natural History, as Diuca behni, after the zoologist Wilhelm Friedrich Georg Behn. Carl Eduard Hellmayr recognized D. behni as a junior synonym of C. erythronota in 1932, transferring the species (which he named "Behn's finch" to the genus Phrygilus, where it remained for many decades.

As with many neotropical "finches," the white-throated sierra finch is not a true finch, but instead belongs to the tanager family (Thraupidae). In 2014, a large molecular phylogenetic study of the tanagers found Phrygilus to be polyphyletic, with the two "gray-and-white" sierra finches (white-throated and red-backed) most closely related to the glacier finch and the boulder finch. Consequently, the two gray-and-white sierra finches, along with the glacier finch, were transferred to the genus Idiopsar, which previously solely contained the boulder finch.

The white-throated and red-backed sierra finches are sister species, and are so closely related that the latter has previously been classified as a subspecies of the former; such was the opinion of Erwin Stresemann, whose view on the classification of the two species was solicited by Rodulfo Amando Philippi Bañados in 1940. The two species are largely disjunct in range, with the red-backed sierra finch found further south and east than the white-throated. It is unclear how extensive sympatry is at the junction of the two ranges in Bolivia and Chile, and whether, or how extensively, hybridization occurs between the species.

The white-throated sierra finch is monotypic, with no known geographic variation.

== Description ==
The white-throated sierra finch is a relatively large tanager, with a total adult length of 14-18 cm and a wing length of approximately 10-11 cm. Adults are mostly gray in plumage, with a medium-to-dark gray head, mantle, and breast contrasting with a white throat, belly, and undertail coverts. The coverts, which contrast sharply with the lighter back, are dark gray, approaching black. The secondaries and primaries are blackish with lighter gray outer edges. The tail feathers are also blackish with white tips. The relatively short and thick triangular bill, which measures 12-14 mm, is also gray. The iris is a dark russet color, while the legs and feet are blackish. The species is sexually monomorphic.

Unlike adults, juveniles have extensive brown on the back, with some brown on the underparts as well. While the adults are distinct, juvenile white-throated and red-backed sierra finches resemble one another, which has likely caused confusion over the range limits and extent of sympatry between the two species.

== Distribution and habitat ==
The white-throated sierra finch is found in a localized, high-elevation region of the Altiplano stretching from Arequipa province in Peru south and east to Potosí Department in Bolivia. In Chile, it is almost entirely restricted to Parinacota Province, along the border with Bolivia and Peru.

Across this range, it is found primarily in Puna grassland between 3700-5100 meters, especially around bofedales and nearby rocky areas. It extensively co-occurs with the closely related and more widely distributed glacier finch.

== Behavior ==
The white-throated sierra finch is primarily granivorous, and forages on the ground. As with many tanagers, it usually occurs in pairs or small social groups. During the autumn, white-winged sierra finches are known to feed on cultivated quinoa grains in Peru and Bolivia, along with a number of other granivorous birds such as the rufous-collared sparrow and the eared dove.

Breeding occurs in the austral autumn, likely primarily between March and May. Little is known about the particular reproductive behaviors of the species or the nest, egg, or chick characteristics.

== Conservation status ==
While the white-throated sierra finch is evaluated as Least Concern by the IUCN Red List, it has a relatively small range and is generally described as uncommon throughout this range. Despite this, there are some localities where the species is frequently reported and is fairly abundant; in particular, in Chile's Lauca National Park.
