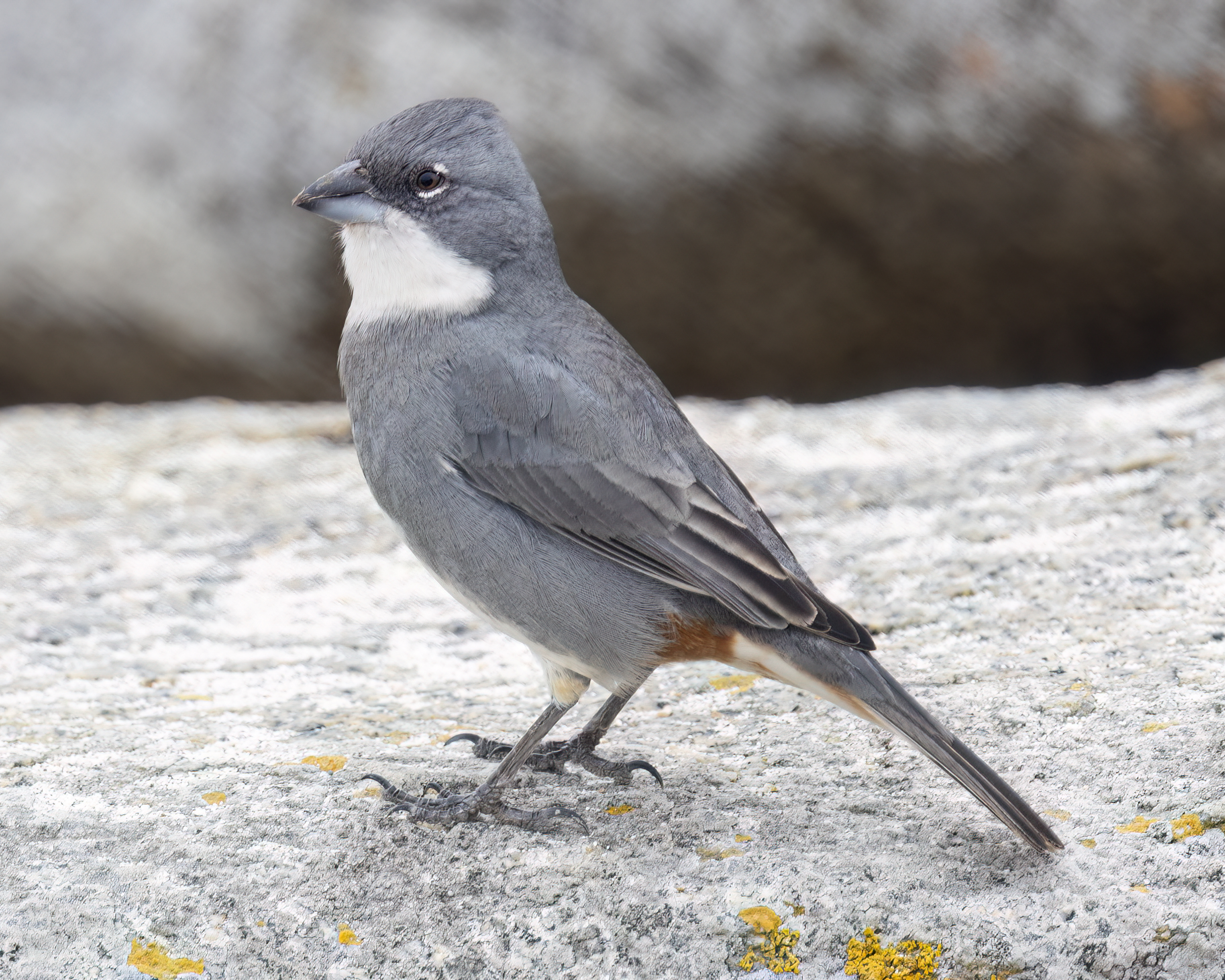

Conservation status
- Least Concern (IUCN 3.1)

Scientific classification
- Kingdom: Animalia
- Phylum: Chordata
- Class: Aves
- Order: Passeriformes
- Family: Thraupidae
- Genus: Diuca; Reichenbach, 1850
- Species: D. diuca

Binomial name
- Diuca diuca (Molina, 1782)

Synonyms
- Fringilla diuca (protonym)

= Diuca finch =

Species of bird

The diuca finch (Diuca diuca) is a species of bird in the tanager family Thraupidae. It is the only member of the genus Diuca. It is found in Argentina, Bolivia, Brazil, Chile, and Uruguay. Its natural habitats are subtropical or tropical dry shrubland, subtropical or tropical high-altitude shrubland, and heavily degraded former forest.

== Taxonomy ==
The diuca finch was formally described in 1782 by the Chilean naturalist Juan Ignacio Molina under the binomial name Fringilla diuca. The specific epithet is from the Araucano names Diuca or Siuca for this species. With the transfer of the glacier finch (formerly white-winged diuca finch) to Idiopsar or Chionodacryon, the diuca finch is now the only member of the genus Diuca, which was introduced in 1850 by the German naturalist Ludwig Reichenbach.

Four subspecies are recognised:

- D. d. crassirostris Hellmayr, 1932 – north-central Chile, south Bolivia and north Argentina
- D. d. diuca (Molina, 1782) – central, south-central Chile and west Argentina
- D. d. chiloensis Philippi Bañados & Peña, 1964 – Chiloé Island (off southern Chile)
- D. d. minor Bonaparte, 1850 – central, south Argentina and south Chile
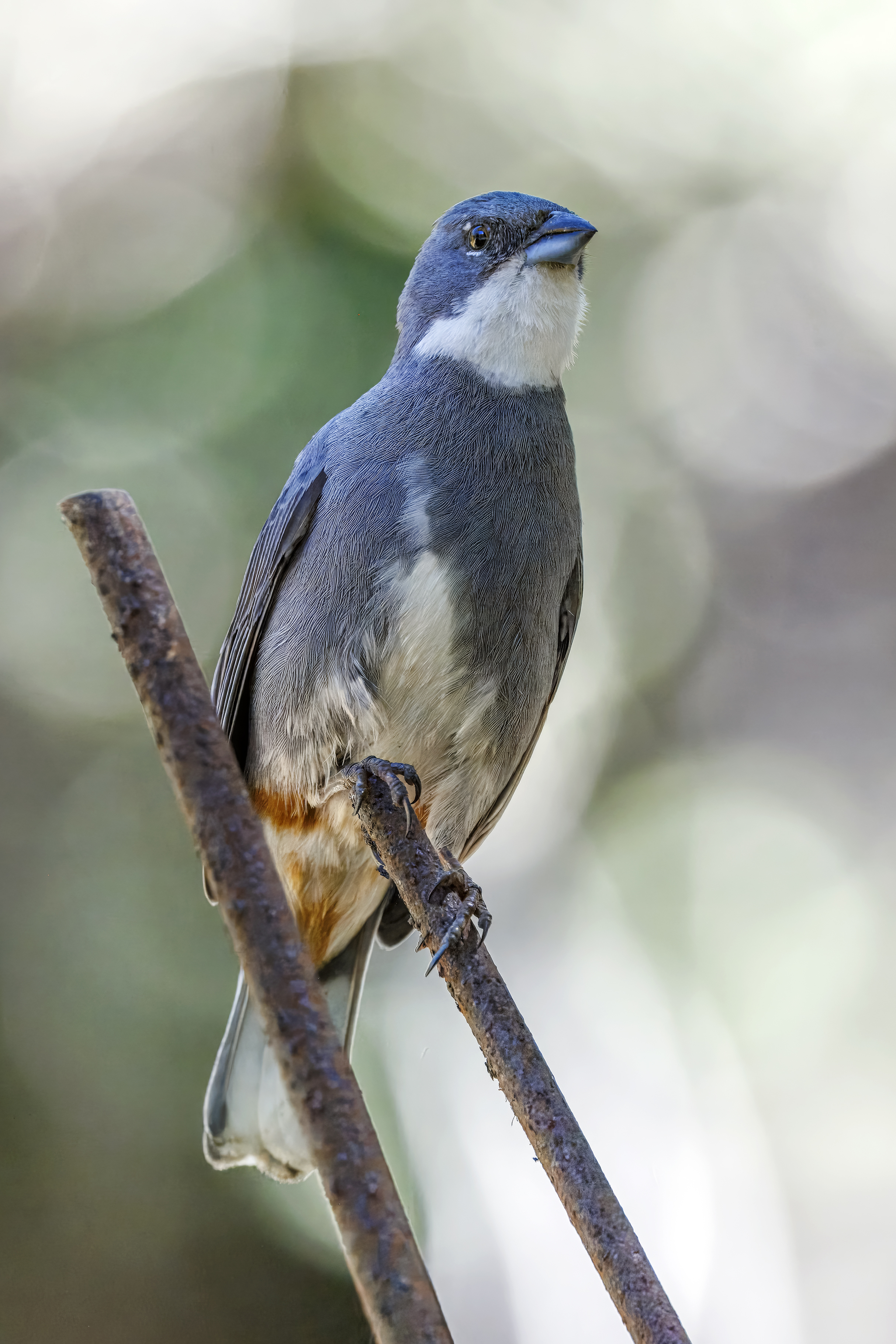
D. d. diuca
central Chile

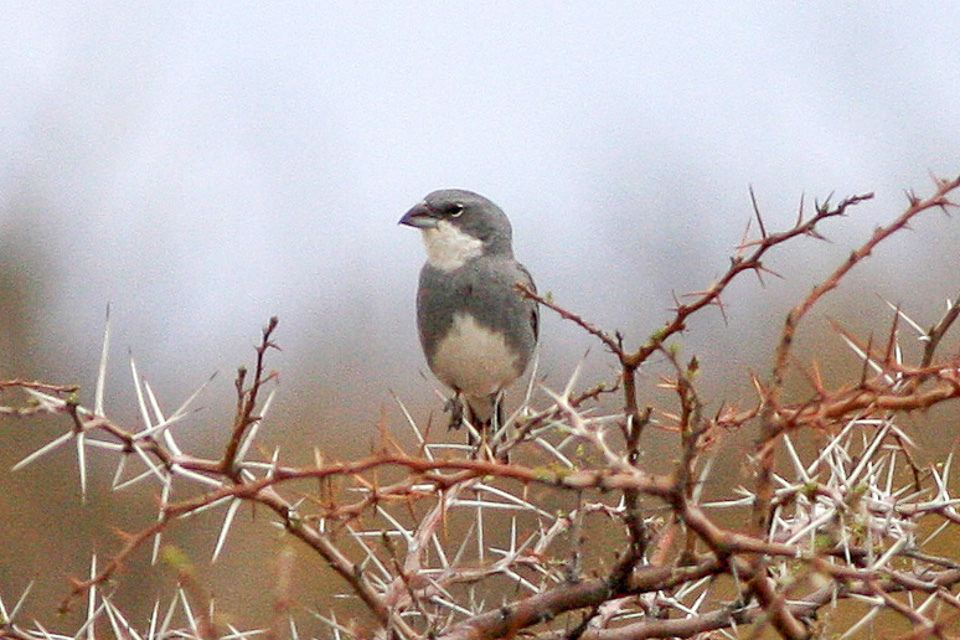
D. d. crassirostris
northern Argentina
