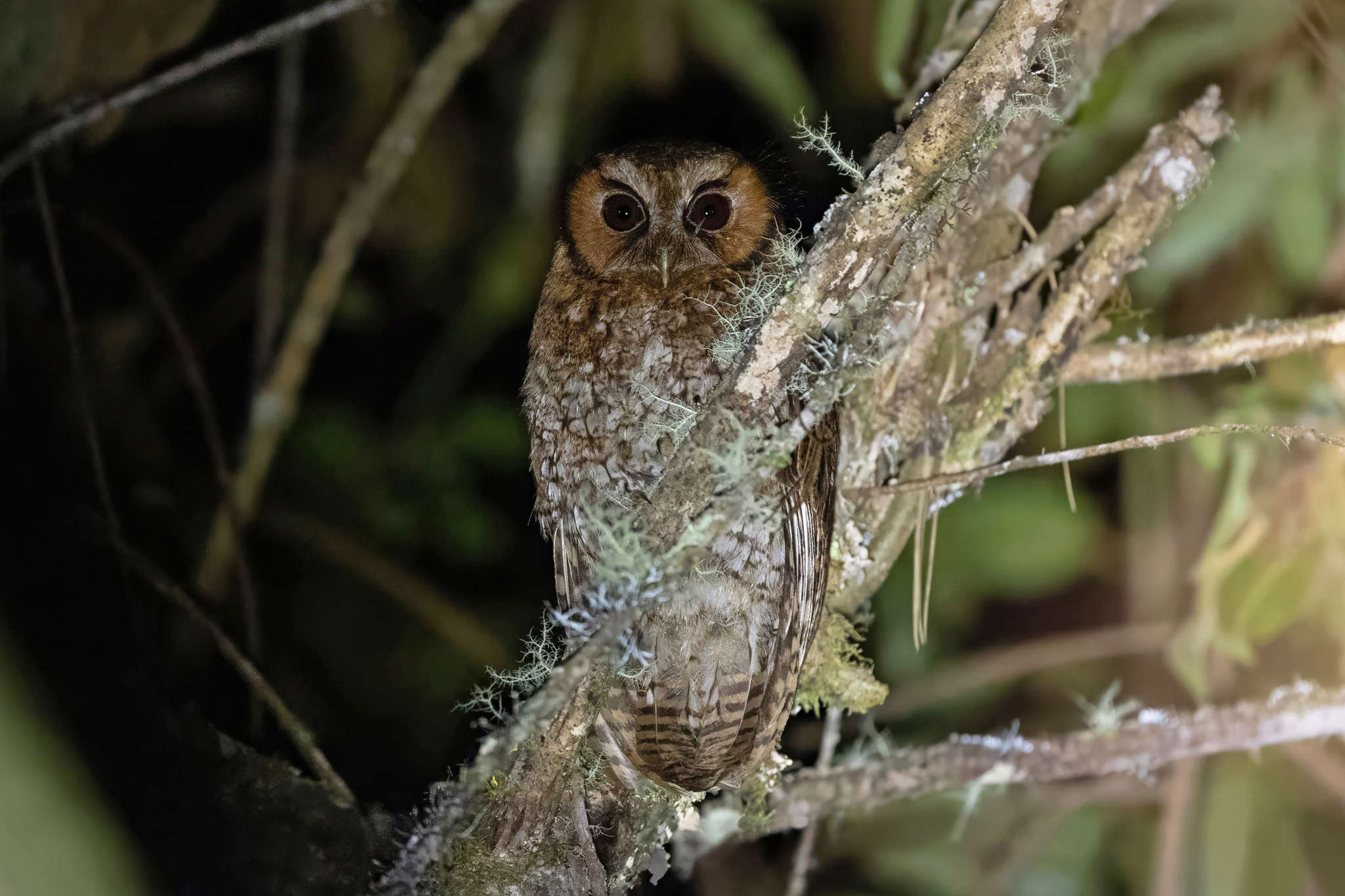

Conservation status
- Near Threatened (IUCN 3.1)
- CITES Appendix II

Scientific classification
- Kingdom: Animalia
- Phylum: Chordata
- Class: Aves
- Order: Strigiformes
- Family: Strigidae
- Genus: Megascops
- Species: M. marshalli

Binomial name
- Megascops marshalli (Weske & Terborgh, 1981)

Synonyms
- Otus marshalli Weske & Terborgh, 1981

= Cloud-forest screech owl =

Species of owl

The cloud-forest screech owl (Megascops marshalli) is a species of owl in the family Strigidae. It is found in Bolivia and Peru.

== Taxonomy and systematics ==
The cloud-forest screech owl is monotypic. Its nearest relatives are the cinnamon screech owl (Megascops petersoni) and Yungas screech owl (M. hoyi) but their exact relationship has not been settled. The species' specific epithet commemorates Joe T. Marshall, "the modern-day student of nightbirds".

== Description ==
The cloud-forest screech owl is 20 to 23 cm (7.9 to 9.1 in) long; a male and a female weighed 105 g (3.7 oz) and 115 g (4.1 oz) respectively. It is among the smallest screech owls. It has a rufous facial disc with black edges on the sides, white brows over dark brown eyes, and short "ear" tufts. Its crown and upperparts are a rich reddish brown with blackish mottling and a buffy nuchal "collar". The folded wing shows a line of white spots and the tail is barred. Its breast is rufous with dark streaks and thin vermiculations. Its belly is off-white with dark streaks and thin barring.

== Distribution and habitat ==
The cloud-forest screech owl was originally thought to be confined to south and central Peru, in the Departments of Pasco, Cuzco, and Puno. Since 2005 it has been recorded in northern Bolivia as well. It inhabits cloud forest, a humid, mossy landscape with epiphytes, ferns, and a dense understory. In elevation it ranges at least from 1,900 to 2,600 m (6,200 to 8,500 ft) and possibly higher.

== Behavior ==
=== Feeding ===
The cloud-forest screech owl forages in the canopy; it is believed to be mostly insectivorous.

=== Breeding ===
Very little is known about the cloud-forest screech-owls breeding phenology. It appears to breed between late June and August and is assumed to nest in tree cavities like others of its genus.

=== Vocalization ===
The cloud-forest screech owl's song is "a continuous series of monotonic hoots" whose intensity increases and then ends abruptly. It also occasionally utters a "trill-like short song".

== Status ==
The IUCN has assessed the cloud-forest screech owl as being Near Threatened. It is "believed to have a very small range and is therefore highly susceptible to any future threats to its habitat."
