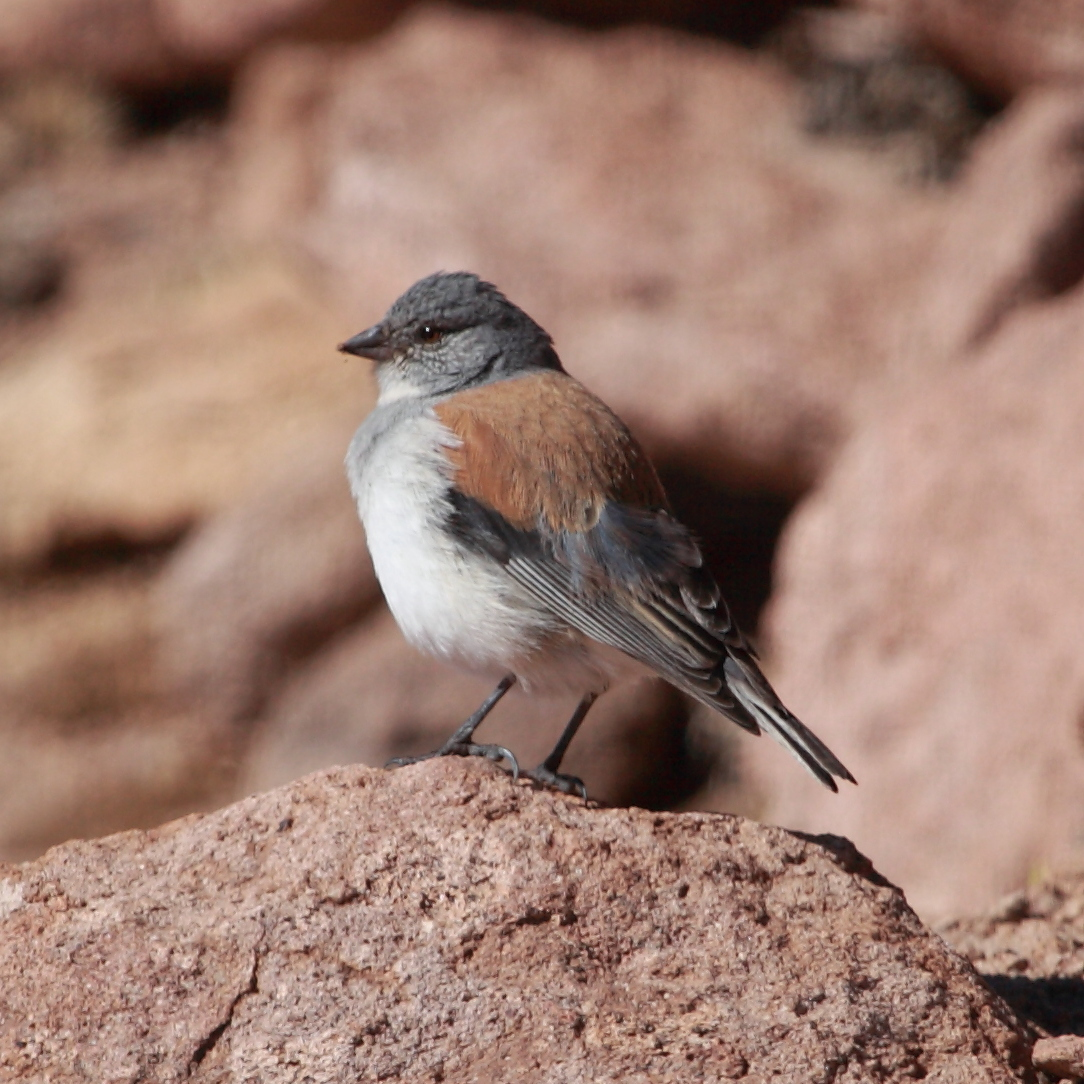
- Red-backed sierra finch (Idiopsar dorsalis)

Scientific classification
- Kingdom: Animalia
- Phylum: Chordata
- Class: Aves
- Order: Passeriformes
- Family: Thraupidae
- Genus: Idiopsar; Cassin, 1867

Type species
- Idiopsar brachyurus Cassin, 1867

Species
- See text

= Idiopsar =

Genus of birds

Idiopsar is a genus of Neotropical seed-eating birds in the tanager family Thraupidae.

== Taxonomy and species list ==
The genus Idiopsar was introduced in 1867 by the American ornithologist John Cassin to accommodate the newly described boulder finch. The name combines the Ancient Greek idios meaning "distinct" or "peculiar" with psar meaning "starling".

This genus formerly contained a single species, the boulder finch. A molecular phylogenetic study of the tanager family (Thraupidae) published in 2014 found that the boulder finch was a member of a clade that contained three species assigned to other genera. In the ensuing reorganization of generic boundaries, these three species were assigned to Idiopsar. The same genetic study found that Idiopsar is sister to the tit-like dacnis in the monospecific genus Xenodacnis.

The genus contains the following four species.

Genus Idiopsar – Cassin, 1867 – four species
| Common name | Scientific name and subspecies | Range | Size and ecology | IUCN status and estimated population |
|---|---|---|---|---|
| Red-backed sierra finch | Idiopsar dorsalis (Cabanis, 1883) | Southern Andean Yungas of Bolivia and northern Chile and Argentina | Size: Habitat: Subtropical or tropical high-altitude grassland Diet: | LC |
| White-throated sierra finch | Idiopsar erythronotus (Philippi & Landbeck, 1861) | Localized high-elevation region of the Altiplano, from Arequipa province in Peru south and east to Potosí Department in Bolivia; in Chile almost entirely restricted to Parinacota Province | Size: 14–18 cm (5.5–7.1 in) Habitat: Puna grassland at 3,700–5,100 m (12,100–16,700 ft), especially around bofedales and nearby rocky areas Diet: Primarily granivorous, foraging on the ground; usually in pairs or small social groups; in autumn feeds on cultivated quinoa grains in Peru and Bolivia | LC |
| Glacier finch | Idiopsar speculifer (Lafresnaye & d'Orbigny, 1837) | Peru, Bolivia and far northern Chile and Argentina | Size: Habitat: Subtropical or tropical high-altitude grassland, favouring wet boggy ground; one of the few birds recorded nesting on high-altitude glaciers, sometimes directly on the ice Diet: | LC |
| Boulder finch | Idiopsar brachyurus Cassin, 1867 | Argentina, Bolivia and Peru | Size: Habitat: Subtropical or tropical high-altitude grassland Diet: | LC |
