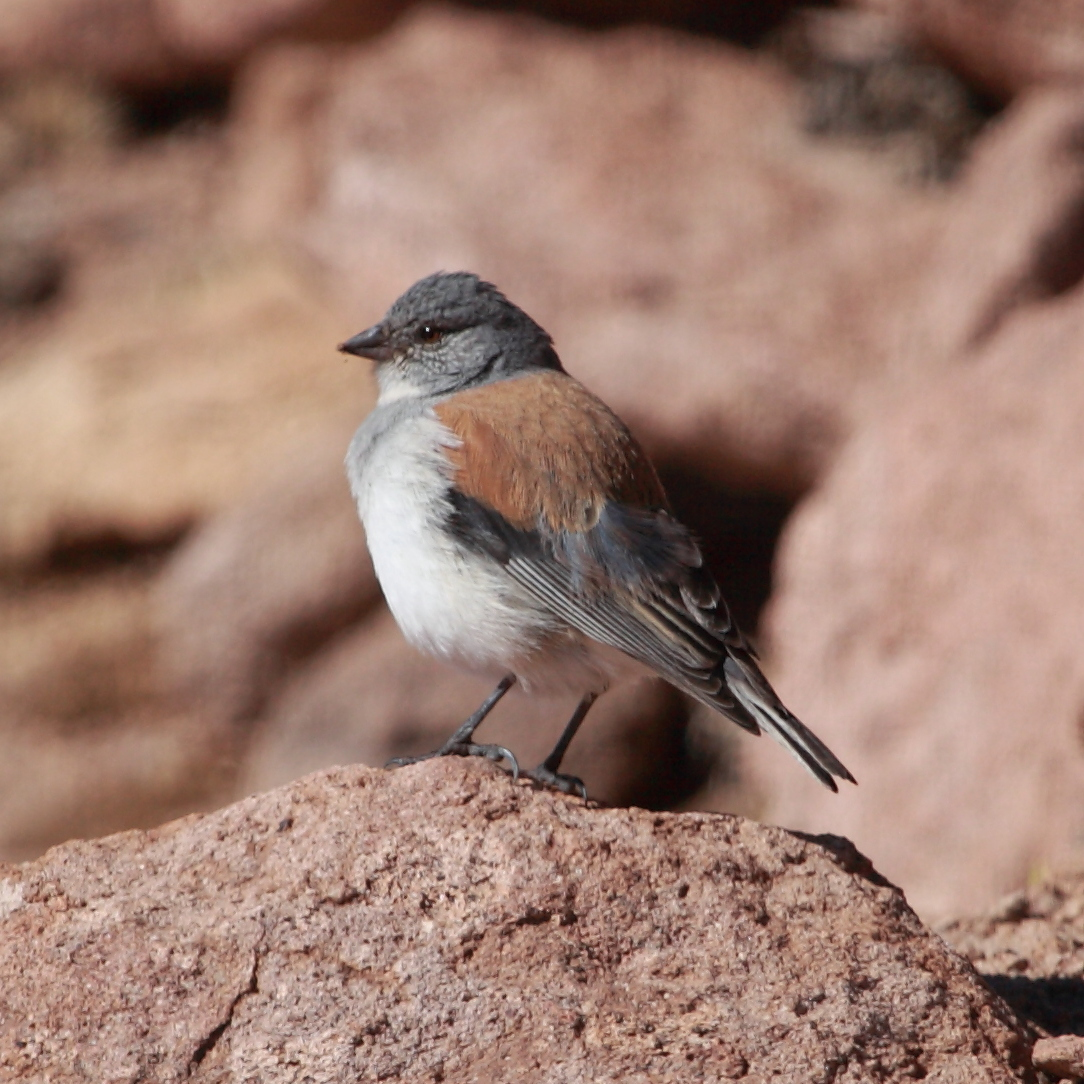
- Red-backed sierra finch at San Pedro de Atacama, Antofagasta Region, Chile

Conservation status
- Least Concern (IUCN 3.1)

Scientific classification
- Kingdom: Animalia
- Phylum: Chordata
- Class: Aves
- Order: Passeriformes
- Family: Thraupidae
- Genus: Idiopsar
- Species: I. dorsalis

Binomial name
- Idiopsar dorsalis (Cabanis, 1883)

Synonyms
- Phrygilus dorsalis Ephippiospingus dorsalis

= Red-backed sierra finch =

Species of bird

The red-backed sierra finch (Idiopsar dorsalis) is a species of bird in the family Thraupidae.

It is found in the Southern Andean Yungas of Bolivia and northern Chile and Argentina, where its natural habitat is subtropical or tropical high-altitude grassland.
