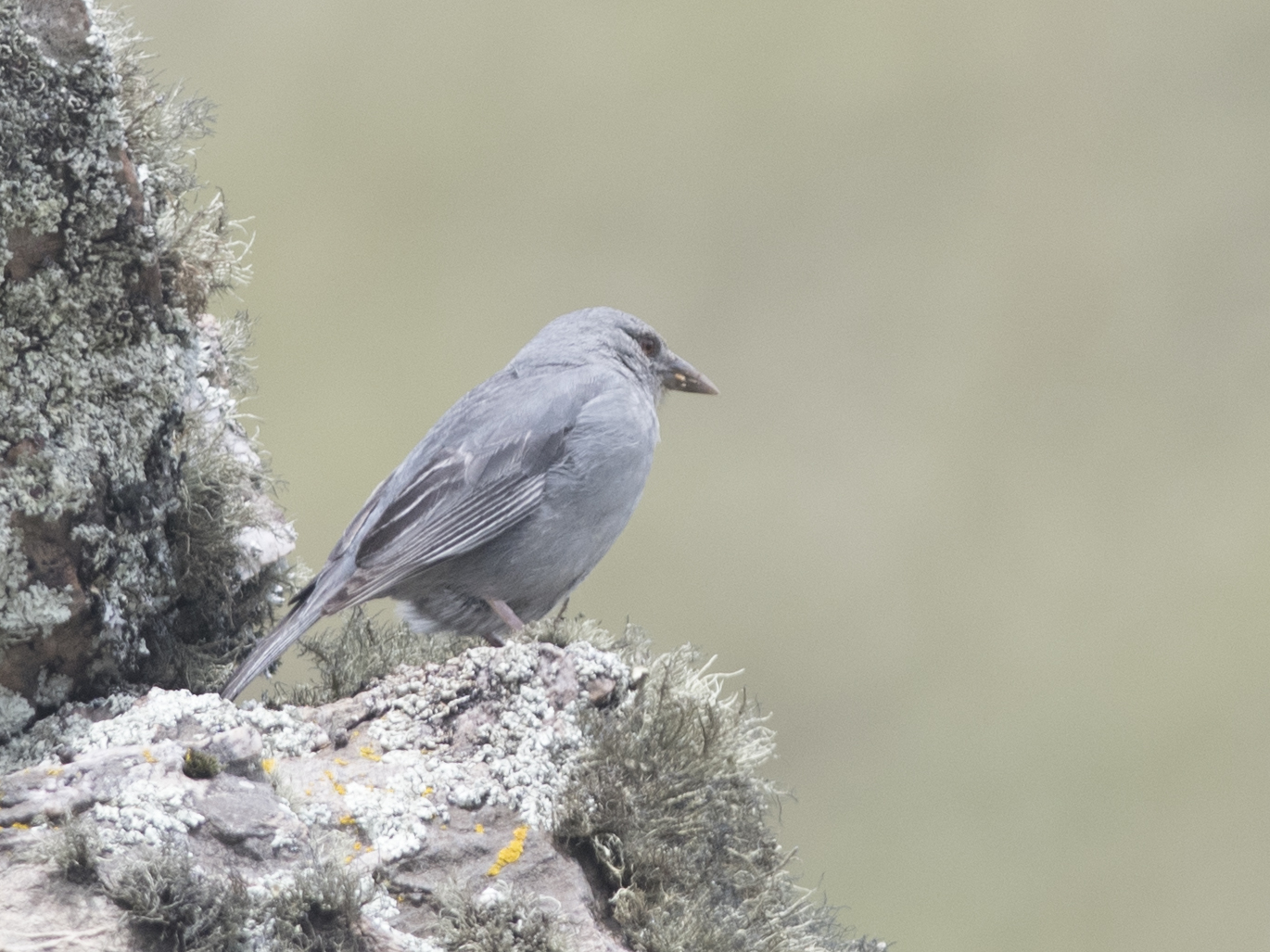

Conservation status
- Least Concern (IUCN 3.1)

Scientific classification
- Kingdom: Animalia
- Phylum: Chordata
- Class: Aves
- Order: Passeriformes
- Family: Thraupidae
- Genus: Idiopsar
- Species: I. brachyurus

Binomial name
- Idiopsar brachyurus Cassin, 1867

= Boulder finch =

Species of bird

The boulder finch or short-tailed finch (Idiopsar brachyurus) is a species of bird previously placed in the family Emberizidae, but it appears to be related to the sierra finches Phrygilus of the tanager family Thraupidae and is now placed there.

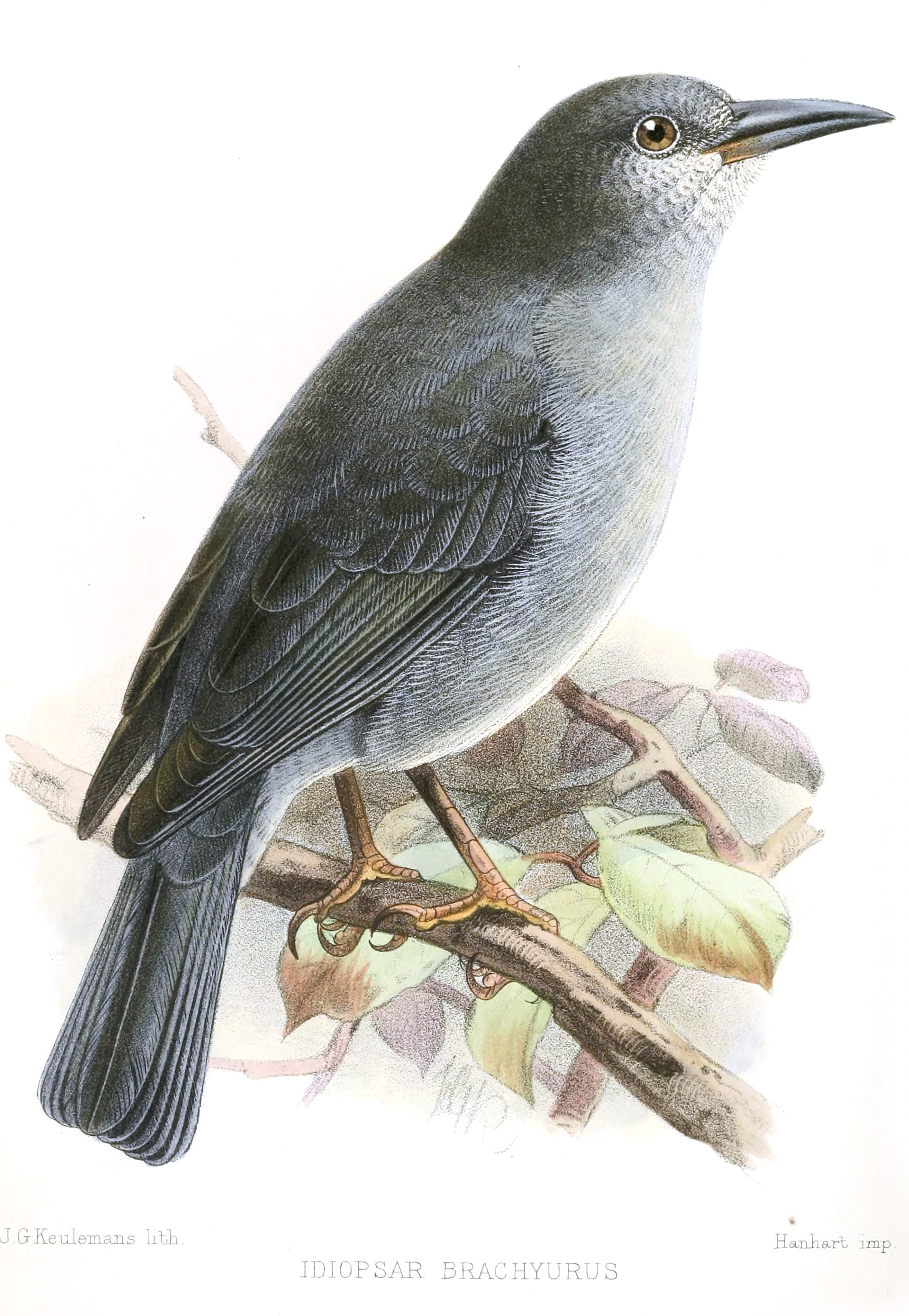
Boulder finch by Keulemans

It is found in Argentina, Bolivia, and Peru. Its natural habitat is subtropical or tropical high-altitude grassland.
