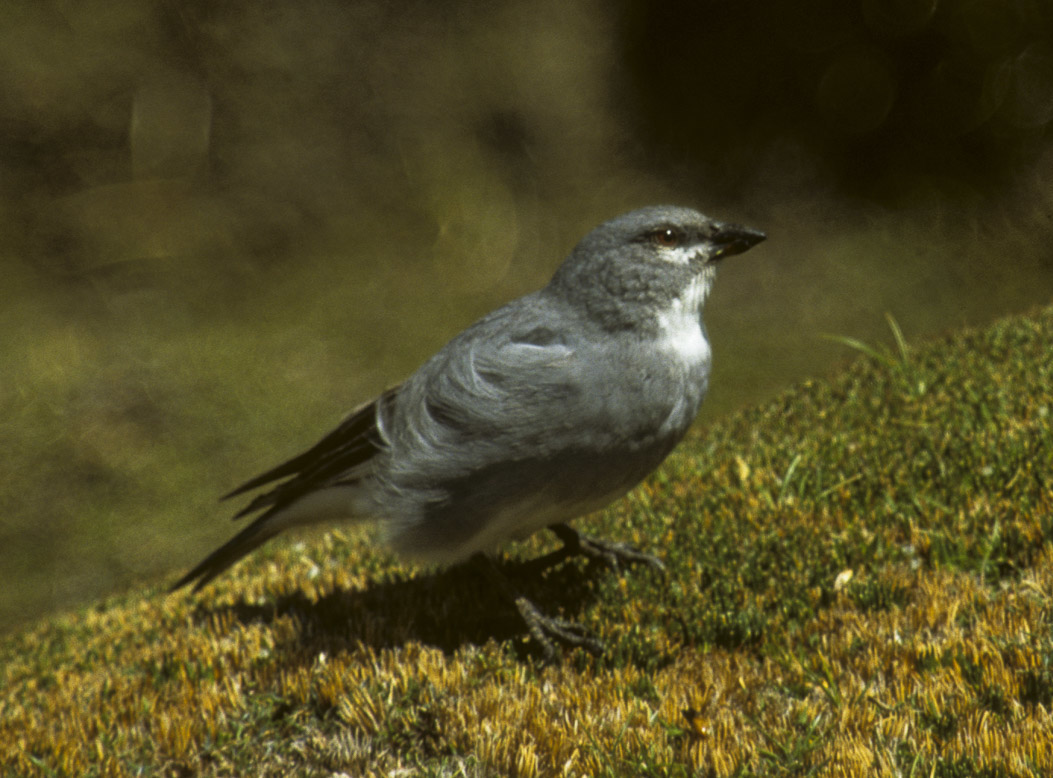

Conservation status
- Least Concern (IUCN 3.1)

Scientific classification
- Kingdom: Animalia
- Phylum: Chordata
- Class: Aves
- Order: Passeriformes
- Family: Thraupidae
- Genus: Idiopsar
- Species: I. speculifer

Binomial name
- Idiopsar speculifer (Lafresnaye & d'Orbigny, 1837)

Synonyms
- Emberiza speculifera (protonym); Diuca speculifera Chionodacryon speculiferum

= Glacier finch =

Species of bird

The glacier finch (Idiopsar speculifer), also known as the white-winged diuca finch and glacier bird, is a species of bird in the tanager family Thraupidae.

It is found in Peru, Bolivia and far northern Chile and Argentina. Its natural habitat is subtropical or tropical high-altitude grassland, where it favours wet boggy ground. It is one of the few birds that have been recorded as nesting in high altitude glaciers, hence its alternative name "the glacier bird". The nest is a bulky structure in the form of a cup, made of grass, twigs and feathers: it can weigh up to half a pound, and may be laid directly on the ice. Two eggs are laid in April or May; the young leave the nest in June or July.
