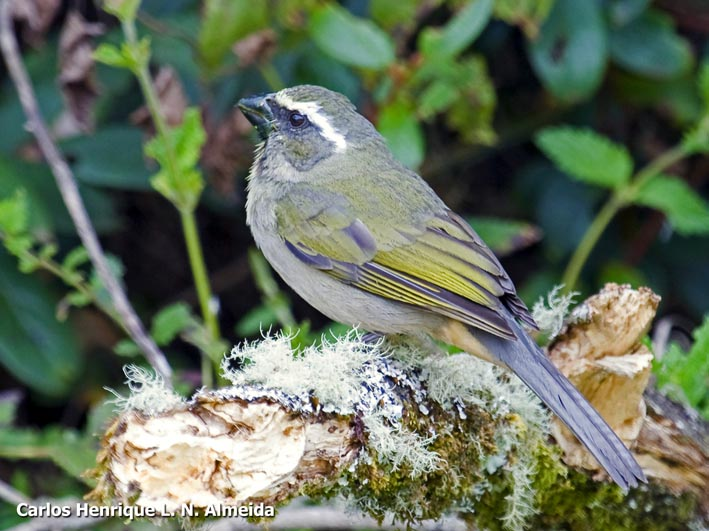

Conservation status
- Least Concern (IUCN 3.1)

Scientific classification
- Kingdom: Animalia
- Phylum: Chordata
- Class: Aves
- Order: Passeriformes
- Family: Thraupidae
- Genus: Saltator
- Species: S. maxillosus

Binomial name
- Saltator maxillosus Cabanis, 1851

= Thick-billed saltator =

Species of bird

The thick-billed saltator (Saltator maxillosus) is a species of saltator in the family Thraupidae. It is found in highland Atlantic Forest in southeastern Brazil, far northeastern Argentina (only Misiones Province), and perhaps far eastern Paraguay. Unlike most other saltators, it is sexually dichromatic: Females resemble a green-winged saltator, but with a thicker bill, greener face and buff throat. The male thick-billed saltator is unique with its long white eyebrow, grey back, and black and orange beak (amount of orange varies).

== Taxonomy ==
Monotypic species ( subspecies are not recognized ).

(Clements checklist, 2014).

== Description ==
Measures about 19 centimeters. It draws attention by the very thick, tall and yellow beak at the base. Upper parts dark gray. Almost without green, white eyebrow starting at the base of the beak, lower parts rusty; female with green back; the immature with green upper parts and the black beak.

Its vocalization is by stanza of four strong calls, the third loudest, sings from August onwards.

== Behavior ==
=== Feeding ===
Just like its counterpart, the real iron crack (Saltator similis), this species feeds on seeds, leaves, insects and fruits (omnivorous).

=== Breeding ===
During reproduction they live strictly in couples, extremely loyal to a territory. They build cup-shaped nests at little height, the incubation lasts around 14 days. It has an average of 2 litters per season with 3 eggs each.

== Distribution and habitat ==
They live on the edge of the forest, gardens, locally in the high mountains of Southeast Brazil. The species range is from Espírito Santo to Rio de Janeiro, and from there to the northeast of Rio Grande do Sul and east of Argentina.
