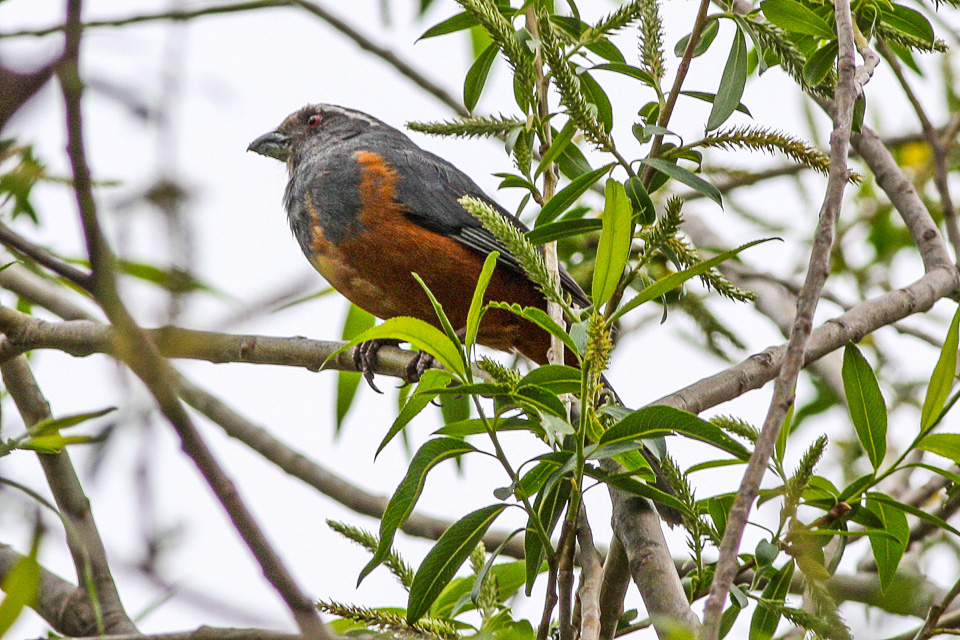

Conservation status
- Least Concern (IUCN 3.1)

Scientific classification
- Kingdom: Animalia
- Phylum: Chordata
- Class: Aves
- Order: Passeriformes
- Family: Thraupidae
- Genus: Pseudosaltator; K.J. Burns, Unitt & N.A. Mason, 2016
- Species: P. rufiventris

Binomial name
- Pseudosaltator rufiventris (d'Orbigny & Lafresnaye, 1837)

Synonyms
- Saltator rufiventris (protonym)

= Rufous-bellied mountain tanager =

Species of bird

The rufous-bellied mountain tanager or rufous-bellied saltator (Pseudosaltator rufiventris) is a species of songbird in the tanager family Thraupidae and is the only member of the genus Pseudosaltator. It is found in the eastern Andes of southern Bolivia and extreme northern Argentina. It occurs mostly at altitudes from 3000 m to 4000 m. Its habitat is open land, including cultivated land, that has patches of scrub, alder trees, or Polylepis trees. It is threatened by habitat loss.

== Taxonomy ==
The rufous-bellied mountain tanager was formally described in 1837 by the French naturalists Alcide d'Orbigny and Frédéric de Lafresnaye from a specimen collected near the small town of Sica Sica in western Bolivia. They coined the binomial name Saltator rufiventris. The specific name is derived from the Latin rufus meaning "ruddy" or "rufous" and venter meaning "belly". The species was known by the English name "rufous-bellied mountain saltator". A molecular phylogenetic study published in 2007 found that the genus Saltator belonged in the tanager family Thraupidae rather than Cardinalidae and that the rufous-bellied mountain saltator was not closely related to other members of the genus Saltator but was instead related to Dubusia. These results were confirmed by a comprehensive molecular study of the tanagers published in 2014. Rather than placing the "rufous-bellied mountain saltator" in Dubusia, a new genus Pseudosaltator was erected in 2016. The common name was also changed from "saltator" to "tanager". The species is monotypic: no subspecies are recognised.

== Description ==
The plumage is mostly blue-gray with orange underparts from the lower breast to the undertail coverts. There is a long white stripe over the eye. The bill is gray except that the base of the lower mandible is flesh-colored.
