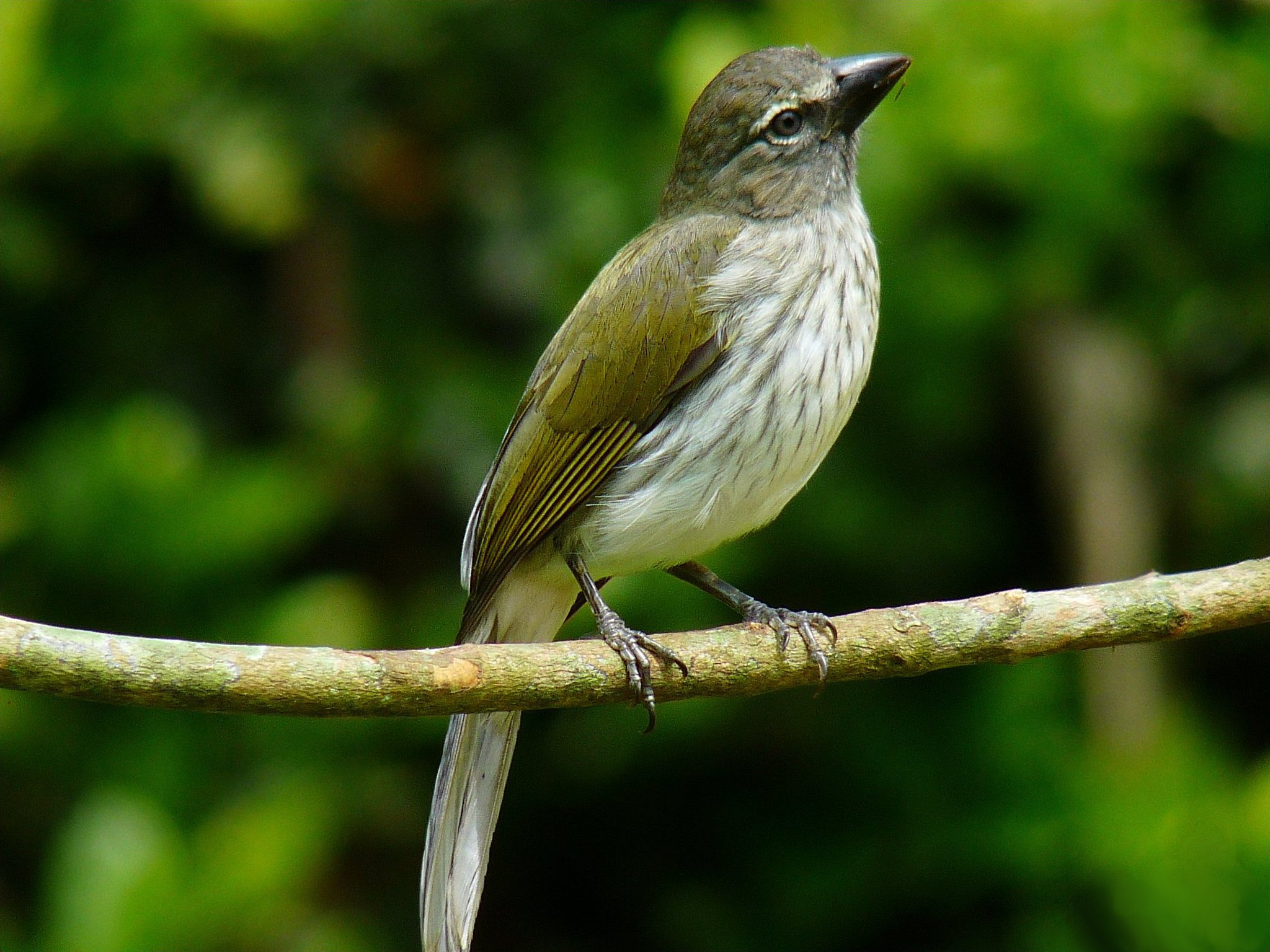
- In Manizales, Caldas, Colombia

Conservation status
- Least Concern (IUCN 3.1)

Scientific classification
- Kingdom: Animalia
- Phylum: Chordata
- Class: Aves
- Order: Passeriformes
- Family: Thraupidae
- Genus: Saltator
- Species: S. striatipectus

Binomial name
- Saltator striatipectus Lafresnaye, 1847

= Streaked saltator =

Species of bird

The streaked saltator (Saltator striatipectus) is a species of bird in the family Thraupidae, the tanagers and allies. It is found in Colombia, Costa Rica, Ecuador, Panama, Peru, and Venezuela.

== Taxonomy and systematics ==
The streaked saltator was formally described in 1847 with its current binomial Saltator striatipectus. For a time it and the Lesser Antillean saltator (S. albicollis) were considered conspecific.

The streaked saltator has these 10 subspecies:

- S. s. furax Bangs & Penard, TE, 1919
- S. s. isthmicus Sclater, PL, 1861
- S. s. scotinus Wetmore, 1957
- S. s. melicus Wetmore, 1952
- S. s. speratus Bangs & Penard, TE, 1919
- S. s. striatipectus Lafresnaye, 1847
- S. s. perstriatus Parkes, 1959
- S. s. flavidicollis Sclater, PL, 1860
- S. s. immaculatus Berlepsch & Stolzmann, 1892
- S. s. peruvianus Cory, 1916

== Description ==
The streaked saltator is 19 to 20.5 cm (7.5 to 8.1 in) long and weighs about 30 to 40 g (1.1 to 1.4 oz). The sexes have the same plumage. Adults of the nominate subspecies S. s. striatipectus have a grayish green crown and nape, a thin buffy white supercilium to the eye, whitish arcs above and below the eye, brownish gray lores and ear coverts, and a dusky malar line. Their upperparts and upperwing coverts are greener than the crown and their rump is grayish. Their flight feathers are blackish with wide olive-green edges on the outer webs and their tertials have black inner webs and greenish outer webs. Their tail is gray-brown. Their chin and throat are whitish, their breast off-white with diffuse dark gray streaks, their belly buff-white with gray-black streaks on its side, and their vent and undertail coverts buffy white.

The other subspecies of the streaked saltator differ from the nominate and each other thus:

- S. s. furax: smaller than nominate with more, darker, and heavier streaked underparts
- S. s. isthmicus: smaller than nominate with more greenish or yellowish underparts and heavier, more olive-green streaks
- S. s. scotinus: darkest subspecies with grayer green upperparts, darker face and underpart streaks, and deeper buff undertail coverts than nominate
- S. s. melicus: smaller than nominate with grayer face, darker gray uppertail coverts, more greenish or yellowish underparts and heavier, more olive-green streaks, and darker flanks
- S. s. speratus: smaller than nominate with more yellowish or greenish underparts with streaks intermediate between nominate and isthmicus
- S. s. perstriatus: green upperparts; heavier underparts streaks that reach vent; usually yellow tip on bill
- S. s. flavidicollis: longer and wider supercilium than nominate with olive upperparts and minimally streaked whitish underparts, except on Puna Island where has gray upperparts and streaked underparts
- S. s. immaculatus: faint supercilium, grayish head, dull grayish upperparts, whiter throat and belly than nominate, and pale grayish breast with minimal streaking
- S. s. peruvianus: faint supercilium, very olive upperparts, and heavy underparts streaking

All subspecies have a brown iris, a blackish bill with sometimes a yellow tip, and gray-black to black legs and feet.

== Distribution and habitat ==
The streaked saltator has a disjunct distribution. The subspecies are found thus:

- S. s. furax: from southern San José and central Puntarenas provinces in southwestern Costa Rica into western Panama's western Chiriquí Province
- S. s. isthmicus: mainland Panama except Chiriquí and Darién provinces
- S. s. scotinus: Coiba and Coibita islands, in the Pacific off southern Veraguas Province of southwestern Panama
- S. s. melicus: Taboga Island in the Pacific off central Panama's Panamá Province
- S. s. speratus: Pearl Islands in the Gulf of Panama
- S. s. striatipectus: Panama's Darién Province; past a gap from Colombia's Antioquia Department south to the west of the Andes into northern Ecuador to Pichincha Province
- S. s. perstriatus: from northeastern Bolívar, Magdalena, and Norte de Santander departments in northeastern Colombia east into Venezuela, west of the Andes north to southeastern Lara, east of their whole length and across the north in the Coastal Ranges to Sucre and Monagas states; also Trinidad
- S. s. flavidicollis: lowlands from southwestern Esmeraldas Province in northwestern Ecuador south to Tumbes and northern Piura departments in far northwestern Peru
- S. s. immaculatus: coastal Peru from Lambayeque Department south to Ica Department
- S. s. peruvianus: basin of the Marañón River in Zamora-Chinchipe Province, southeastern Ecuador, and Cajamarca and La Libertad departments, northeastern Peru

The streaked saltator inhabits a variety of landscapes. In western Ecuador and in Peru it is found in arid to dry scublands and woodlands and also gardens. In northeastern Colombia and Venezuela it is found in dry to moist, but not arid, areas of woodland, the edges of deciduous forest, scrublands, brushy pastures, and gardens. It occurs in a similar though generally somewhat moister mix of habitats from Costa Rica and Panama south through Colombia into northern Ecuador. In elevation it ranges from sea level to 1,600 m (5,200 ft) in Costa Rica, mostly to 1,600 m (5,200 ft) but as high as 2,000 m (6,600 ft) in Venezuela, and to 2,500 m (8,200 ft) in Colombia. It is found between 300 and 2,500 m (1,000 and 8,200 ft) in northern Ecuador and mostly below 1,500 m (4,900 ft) in the west and south. In Peru it is most common below 1,200 m (3,900 ft) but reaches 2,500 m (8,200 ft) at the southern end of its range.

== Behavior ==
=== Movement ===
The streaked saltator is believed to be a year-round resident.

=== Feeding ===
The streaked saltator feeds on insects, fruits, seeds, flowers, and buds. It usually forages in pairs and sometimes in small groups, and at all levels of its habitat.

=== Breeding ===
The streaked saltator's breeding season has not been fully defined. In spans at least April to June in Costa Rica and January to September in Colombia. It includes April and May in Panama, May in Trinidad, and February and March in Ecuador. Its nest is an open cup made from plant materials, with a relatively coarse outer layer, a middle layer of dried grass, and a lining of fine fibers. It is typically in a shrub or tree between about 1 and 3 m (3 and 10 ft) above the ground and rarely to about double that. In Costa Rica the clutch is two eggs; three are known from Trinidad. The female alone incubates, for about 13 or 14 days, and fledging occurs about 13 days after hatch. Both parents provision nestlings.

=== Vocalization ===
The streaked saltator's song appears variable across its range. One is described as "a lazy and musically whistled o-chúck, chuk-weEEeaaar or a repeated chuck weEEear or chur WEET chuck". Another is "two to four sweet, whistled tsu notes followed by an upwardly inflected tsweeee". A third is "a loud and melodic tchew-tchew-tcheeér...with a distinctive long slurred final note".

== Status ==
The IUCN has assessed the streaked saltator as being of Least Concern. It has an extremely large range; its estimated population of at least five million mature individuals is believed to be stable. No immediate threats have been identified. It is considered "fairly common" in Costa Rica, Venezuela, and Peru, "common" in Colombia, and "locally common" in Ecuador. It "[m]ay benefit from forest clearance and subsequent recolonization by scrubland".
