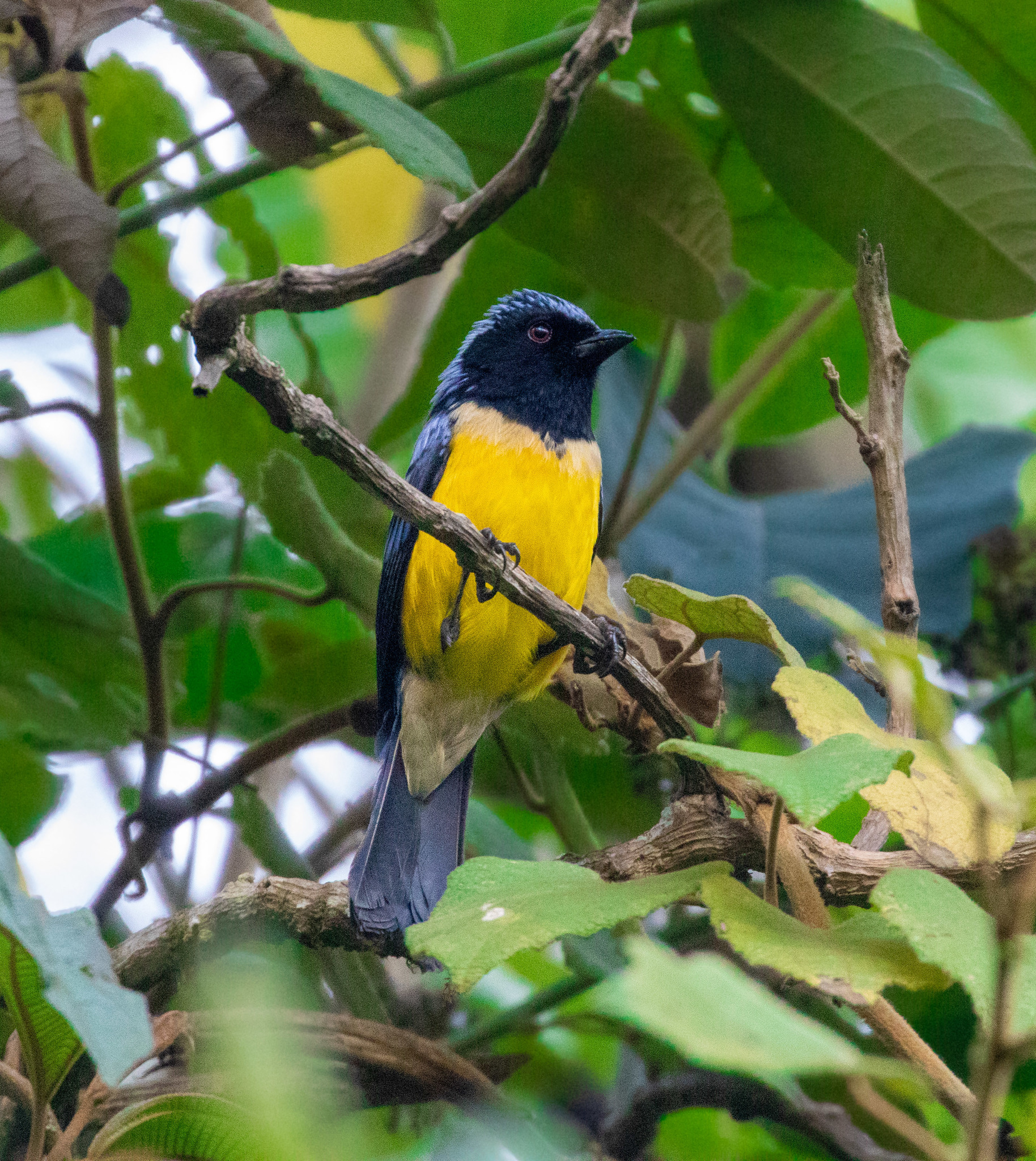

Conservation status
- Least Concern (IUCN 3.1)

Scientific classification
- Kingdom: Animalia
- Phylum: Chordata
- Class: Aves
- Order: Passeriformes
- Family: Thraupidae
- Genus: Dubusia
- Species: D. stictocephala

Binomial name
- Dubusia stictocephala Berlepsch & Stolzmann, 1894

= Streak-crowned mountain tanager =

Species of bird

The streak-crowned mountain tanager (Dubusia stictocephala) is a species of Neotropical bird in the tanager family Thraupidae. The streak-crowned mountain tanager is found only in north to south-central Peru. The streak-crowned mountain tanager is sometimes regarded as a subspecies of the buff-breasted mountain tanager but has been distinguished otherwise in 2023 by the International Ornithologists' Union.
