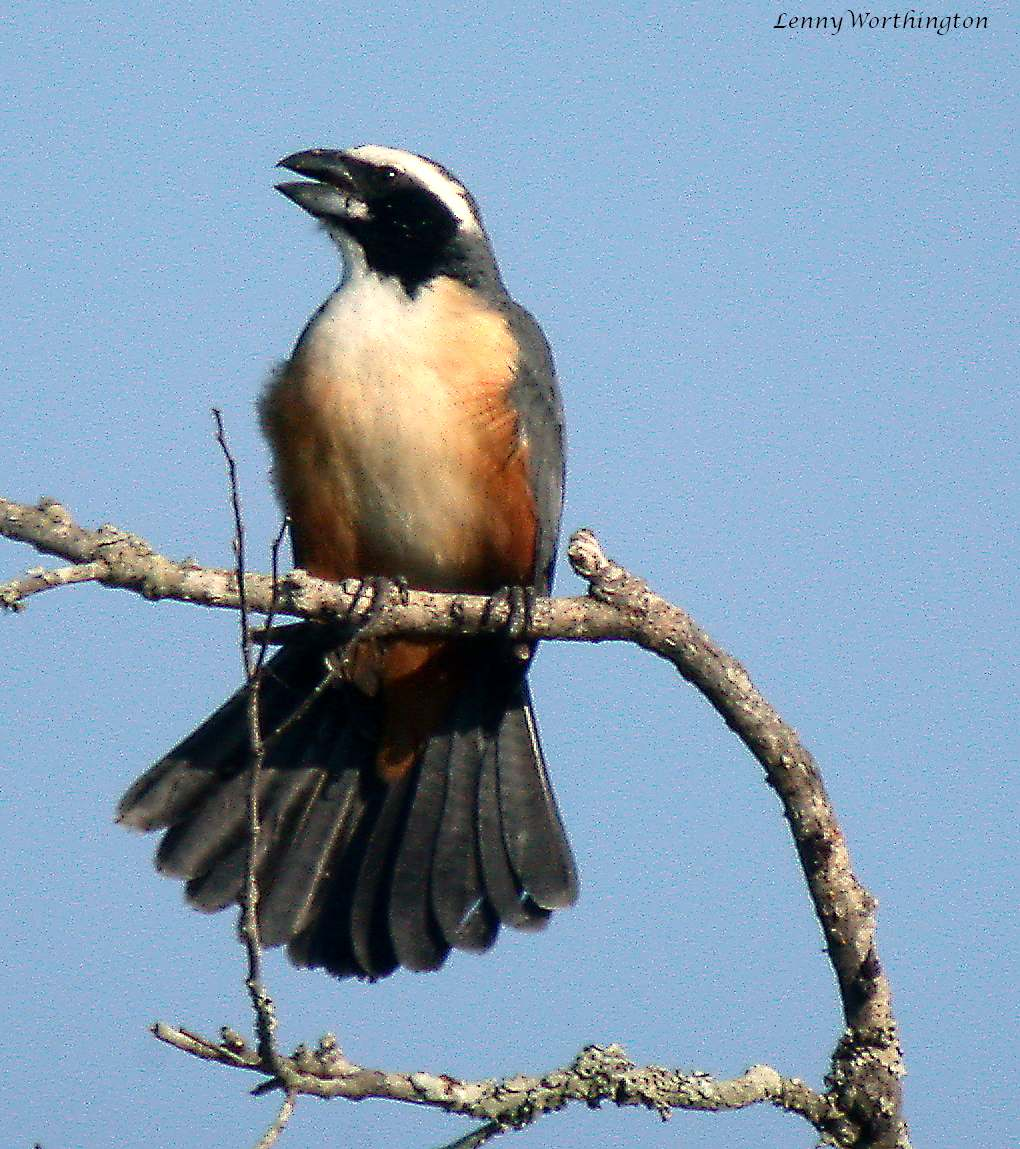

Conservation status
- Least Concern (IUCN 3.1)

Scientific classification
- Kingdom: Animalia
- Phylum: Chordata
- Class: Aves
- Order: Passeriformes
- Family: Thraupidae
- Genus: Saltator
- Species: S. orenocensis

Binomial name
- Saltator orenocensis Lafresnaye, 1846

= Orinoco saltator =

Species of bird

The Orinoco saltator or Orinocan saltator (Saltator orenocensis) is a species of bird in the family Thraupidae, the tanagers and allies. It is found in Colombia and Venezuela.

== Taxonomy and systematics ==
The Orinoco saltator was formally described in 1846 with its current binomial Saltator orenocensis. It has two subspecies, the nominate S. o. orenocensis (Lafresnaye, 1846) and S. o. rufescens (Todd, 1912).

== Description ==
The Orinoco saltator is 18.5 to 19 cm (7.3 to 7.5 in) long; six individuals weighed an average of 33.7 g (1.2 oz). The sexes have the same plumage. Adults of the nominate subspecies have a mostly black face with a long white supercilium and a small white spot at the base of the bill. Their crown, nape, and upperparts are slate-gray. Their wings are mostly blackish with slate-gray edges on the coverts; their primaries are brownish with thin pale edges on the outer webs. Their tail is dull black. Their chin, throat, and breast are white, their belly and flanks buff, and their vent and undertail coverts are buffy brown. Subspecies S. o. rufescens is larger than the nominate with a black forehead and sides of the crown and dark buffy-clay underparts. Both subspecies have a brown iris, a black maxilla, a blackish mandible with a pale lead-gray base, and blackish legs and feet.

== Distribution and habitat ==
The Orinoco saltator has a disjunct distribution. Subspecies S. o. rufescens is the more northerly of the two. It is found on far northern Colombia's Guajira Peninsula and through northwestern Venezuela north of the Andes. The nominate subspecies is found from northern Vichada, northern Casanare, and eastern Arauca departments in east-central Colombia east across central Venezuela from Apure northeast to western Sucre, southern Monagas, far western Delta Amacuro, and northern Bolívar states. In the north subspecies S. o. rufescens inhabits dry deciduous woodlands and brushlands. The nominate is a bird of the Llanos, where it inhabits gallery forest, scrublands, and brushy areas. In elevation it is found below 500 m (1,600 ft) in Colombia and below 600 m (2,000 ft) in Venezuela.

== Behavior ==
=== Movement ===
The Orinoco saltator is believed to be a year-round resident.

=== Feeding ===
The Orinoco saltator feeds primarily on fruits, seeds, and flowers, and to a much lesser extent on insects. It forages in twos or threes, usually high up in trees. It seldom joins mixed-species feeding flocks.

=== Breeding ===
The Orinoco saltator's breeding season has not been defined but includes May and June in Venezuela. Its nest is a cup loosely made from grasses. They have been found in a bush and in cane between about 2 and 5 m (7 and 16 ft) above the ground. The clutch is two eggs that are greenish blue with black markings. The incubation period, time to fledging, and details of parental care are not known. Pairs and trios are very territorial and often mob small owls and snakes.

=== Vocalization ===
The two subspecies of the Orinoco saltator have different songs. That of S. o. rufescens is "a spirited, rollicking chup'ep FEETS er'chup, chup'er FEETS 'er'chup... and so on". The nominate's song in the Llanos is different but not described.

== Status ==
The IUCN has assessed the Orinoco saltator as being of Least Concern. It has a very large range; its population size and trend are not known. No immediate threats have been identified. It is considered fairly common in both countries.
