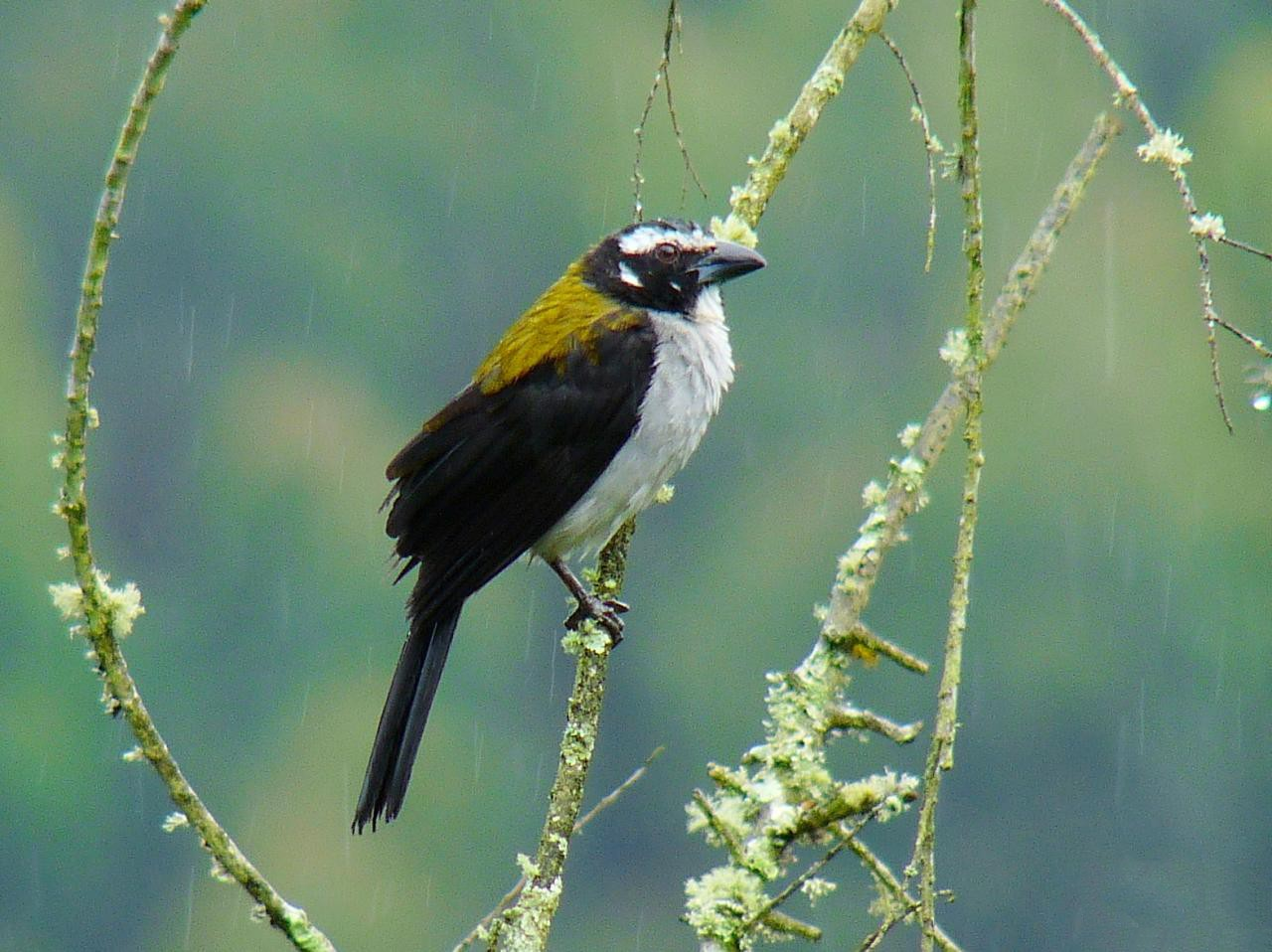
- In Manizales, Caldas, Colombia

Conservation status
- Least Concern (IUCN 3.1)

Scientific classification
- Kingdom: Animalia
- Phylum: Chordata
- Class: Aves
- Order: Passeriformes
- Family: Thraupidae
- Genus: Saltator
- Species: S. atripennis

Binomial name
- Saltator atripennis Sclater, PL, 1857

= Black-winged saltator =

Species of songbird

The black-winged saltator (Saltator atripennis) is a species of songbird in the family Thraupidae, the tanagers and allies. It is found in Colombia and Ecuador.

== Taxonomy and systematics ==
The black-winged saltator was formally described in 1857 with its current binomial Saltator atripennis

The species' further taxonomy is unsettled. The IOC and AviList treat it as monotypic. However, as of late 2025 the Clements taxonomy and BirdLife International's Handbook of the Birds of the World assigned it two subspecies, the nominate S. a. atripennis (Sclater, PL, 1857) and S. a. caniceps (Chapman, 1914).

This article follows the two-subspecies species model.

== Description ==
The black-winged saltator is about 20.5 cm (8.1 in) long and weighs 44 to 60 g (1.6 to 2.1 oz). The sexes have the same plumage. Adults of the nominate subspecies have a mostly black head with a long and wide white supercilium and a small white patch at the rear of the ear coverts. Their upperparts are bright olive-green. Their wings and tail are mostly dull black with faint greenish edges on the tertials and often on the greater coverts. Their chin and throat are white, their breast dove-gray, their belly gray-white with a greenish tinge on the side, and their vent orange-buff. Their lower throat and breast often have a buff wash. Subspecies S. a. caniceps has a mostly gray crown, mostly olive-green tertials, paler undertail coverts, and no buff wash on the throat and breast. Both subspecies have an orange or brown iris, a thick blackish bill, and gray or brown legs and feet.

== Distribution and habitat ==
The black-winged saltator has a disjunct distribution. The nominate subspecies is found in Colombia on both sides of the Western Andes and the western slope of the Central Andes, both from Antioquia Department south to Nariño Department, and into western Esmeraldas Province in far northwestern Ecuador. Subspecies S. a. caniceps is found along the western slope of Colombia's Eastern Andes in Boyacá and Cundinamarca departments and separately along the western slope of the Andes in Ecuador to extreme northern El Oro and Loja provinces.

The black-winged saltator primarily inhabits the canopy and edges of humid to wet primary and mature secondary forest. It also is found in shrubby clearings and in plantations. In Colombia's Central and Western Andes it tends to prefer areas on the drier end of the humid to west continuum. In Colombia it ranges in elevation between 600 and 2,300 m (2,000 and 7,500 ft) and in Ecuador is mostly below 1,500 m (4,900 ft).

== Behavior ==
=== Movement ===
The black-winged saltator is a year-round resident.

=== Feeding ===
The black-winged saltator's diet has not been studied but is believed to be mostly fruit. It forages in the forest's upper levels, often as part of a mixed-species feeding flock.

=== Breeding ===
The black-winged saltator's nesting season has not been defined but includes April in Colombia and includes February and December in Ecuador. Its nest is a deep cup with an outer structure of roots, moss, and leaves and a lining of grasses and fine plant fibers. The clutch is two or three eggs that are blue or greenish with brownish-black markings. Nothing else is known about the species' breeding biology.

=== Vocalization ===
The black-winged saltator's song "varies but is always given at a distinctive leisurely pace". Phrases "are combined in various ways, e.g. twee, twaa, too-u, toweer, tweeeer or a slow teeyr, teeyr followed by a jumble of sputtered notes".

== Status ==
The IUCN has assessed the black-winged saltator as being of Least Concern. It has a large range; its population size and trend are not known. No immediate threats have been identified. It is "[f]airly common in suitable habitat in Colombia; uncommon to locally fairly common in Ecuador".
