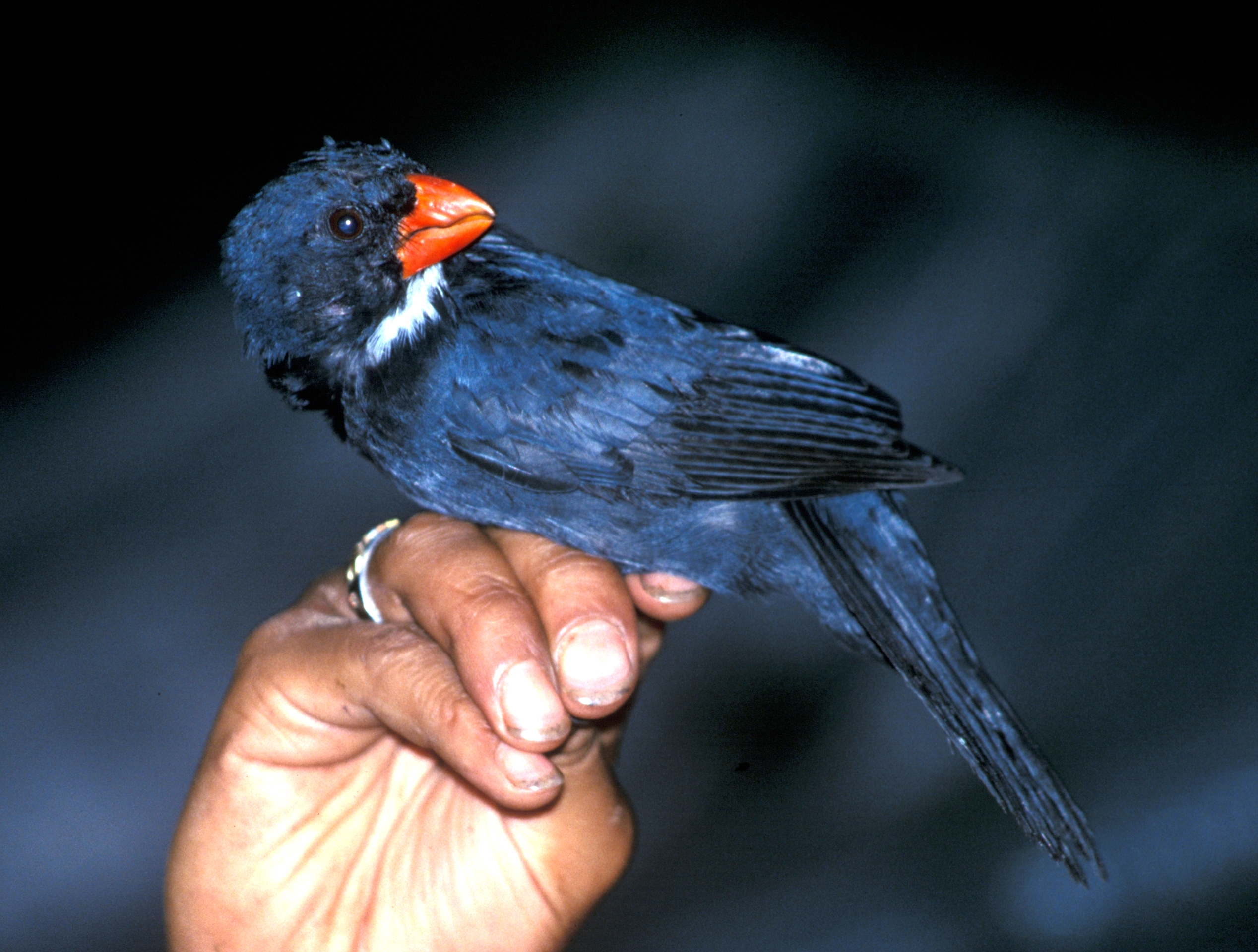

Conservation status
- Least Concern (IUCN 3.1)

Scientific classification
- Kingdom: Animalia
- Phylum: Chordata
- Class: Aves
- Order: Passeriformes
- Family: Thraupidae
- Genus: Saltator
- Species: S. grossus

Binomial name
- Saltator grossus (Linnaeus, 1766)

Synonyms
- see text

Audio

= Slate-coloured grosbeak =

Slate-colored grosbeak

Species of bird

The slate-colored grosbeak (Note: All major worldwide taxonomic systems spell the name "colored".) (Saltator grossus) is a species of bird in the family Thraupidae, the tanagers and allies. It is found from Honduras to Panama and in every mainland South American country except Argentina, Chile, Paraguay, and Uruguay.

== Taxonomy and systematics ==
In 1760 the French zoologist Mathurin Jacques Brisson included a description of the slate-colored grosbeak in the supplement to his Ornithologie based on a specimen collected in "America". He used the French name Le gros-bec bleu d'Amérique and the Latin name Coccothraustes americana caerulea. Although Brisson coined Latin names, these do not conform to the binomial system and are not recognized by the International Commission on Zoological Nomenclature. When in 1766 the Swedish naturalist Carl Linnaeus updated his Systema Naturae for the twelfth edition he added 240 species that had been previously described by Brisson in his Ornithologie. One of these was the slate-colored grosbeak. Linnaeus included a terse description, coined the binomial name Loxia grossa and cited Brisson's work. The specific name grossa, grossus is Latin for "thick", "rough" or "coarse". The type locality was restricted in 1902 to "Cayenne", the then-current name for what is now French Guiana. For a time it and the black-throated grosbeak (S. fuliginosus) were placed in the genus Pitylus, and some authors treated them as conspecific. They are sister species and some authors consider them a superspecies. Both are now placed in the genus Saltator that was introduced by the French ornithologist Louis Pierre Vieillot in 1816.

The slate-colored grosbeak has two subspecies, the nominate S. g. grossus (Linnaeus, 1766) and S. g. saturatus (Todd, 1922).

== Description ==
The slate-colored grosbeak is 19 to 20.5 cm (7.5 to 8.1 in) long and weighs 41 to 53 g (1.4 to 1.9 oz). The species is sexually dimorphic. Adult males of the nominate subspecies are mostly slaty blue. Their lores, face, ear coverts, sides of the throat, and upper breast are black. Their wings are blackish with wide slaty blue edges on the coverts and on the outer webs of the secondaries. Their tail is blackish. Their throat and underwing coverts are white. Adult females are overall duller than males with no black on the face or throat, greenish slate underparts, and a gray-white throat. Subspecies S. g. saturatus is slightly darker overall than the nominate. Both sexes of both subspecies have a deep brown iris, a bright orange-red or red bill, and dark horn to black legs and feet.

The species closely resembles its sister black-throated grosbeak, which however is darker with more black on the face and a black throat.

== Distribution and habitat ==
The slate-colored grosbeak has a disjunct distribution. Subspecies S. g. saturatus is the more northerly of the two and has a much smaller range. It is found on the Caribbean slope from eastern Honduras south through Nicaragua and Costa Rica, continuing through Panama on the Caribbean and Pacific slopes, and south on the western slope of the Andes through Colombia and into Ecuador to far northern El Oro Province. The nominate is found in the Amazon Basin and Guiana Shield from the southeastern third of Colombia south on the eastern Andean slope through Ecuador and Peru into Bolivia and from Colombia and Peru east through the southern Venezuelan states of Amazonas and Bolívar, the Guianas, and Brazil north of a line roughly from western Mato Grosso do Sul northeast to the Atlantic in Maranhão.

The slate-colored grosbeak inhabits the interior and edges of humid forest and mature secondary forest. In the Amazon Basin it occurs in both terra firme and várzea forest. In Central America it ranges in elevation from sea level to 1,250 m (4,100 ft) though only to 750 m (2,500 ft) in Honduras and 1,200 m (3,900 ft) in Costa Rica. In Colombia and Ecuador it reaches 1,200 m (3,900 ft) and in Peru it is mostly below 1,100 m (3,600 ft) but locally occurs up to 1,800 m (5,900 ft). It reaches 1,300 m (4,300 ft) in Venezuela and 1,200 m (3,900 ft) in Brazil.

== Behavior ==
=== Movement ===
The slate-colored grosbeak is believed to be a year-round resident.

=== Feeding ===
The slate-colored grosbeak's diet has not been studied but is known to include seeds and insects. It forages from the forest's mid-level to its canopy, usually in pairs, and sometimes joins mixed-species feeding flocks.

=== Breeding ===
The slate-colored grosbeak's breeding season has not been fully defined but is known to include May in Costa Rica and March to May and September in Colombia. The species' nest is a cup made from roots and other plant material lined with fine fibers. The clutch is two or three eggs that are bluish white with brown markings. The incubation period, time to fledging, and details of parental care are not known.

=== Vocalization ===
One description of the slate-colored grosbeak's song is "a series of 3 to 4 sweet, rich musical whistles (somewhat mournful in quality), pwit-seeur-seeur-see'ehh! or pwit-seeeur-Peee'weur" and of its call is "a nasal, whining eeeeiirrr". Other descriptions of its song and calls are respectively "a variable, mellow warble, usually the same phrase repeated monotonously, for example: chewee chewee-whew" and "a descending, mewing reeeehr and a metallic tchip".

== Status ==
The IUCN has assessed the slate-colored grosbeak as being of Least Concern. It has an extremely large range; its estimated population of at least five million mature individuals is believed to be decreasing. No immediate threats have been identified. It is considered uncommon in Honduras, Costa Rica, and Colombia, fairly common in Peru and Venezuela, and "frequent to uncommon" in Brazil.
