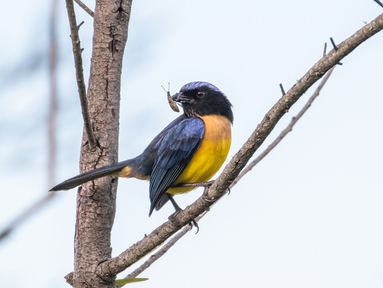

Conservation status
- Near Threatened (IUCN 3.1)

Scientific classification
- Kingdom: Animalia
- Phylum: Chordata
- Class: Aves
- Order: Passeriformes
- Family: Thraupidae
- Genus: Dubusia
- Species: D. carrikeri

Binomial name
- Dubusia carrikeri Wetmore, 1946

= Carriker's mountain tanager =

Carriker's mountain-tanager

Species of bird

Carriker's mountain-tanager (Dubusia carrikeri) is a species of Neotropical bird native to the Sierra Nevada de Santa Marta, Colombia.

It is sometimes regarded as a subspecies of the buff-breasted mountain tanager but has been distinguished otherwise in 2016 by the IUCN Red List. As of today, its population is in decline due to habitat damage by recreation, pollution, and climate change.
