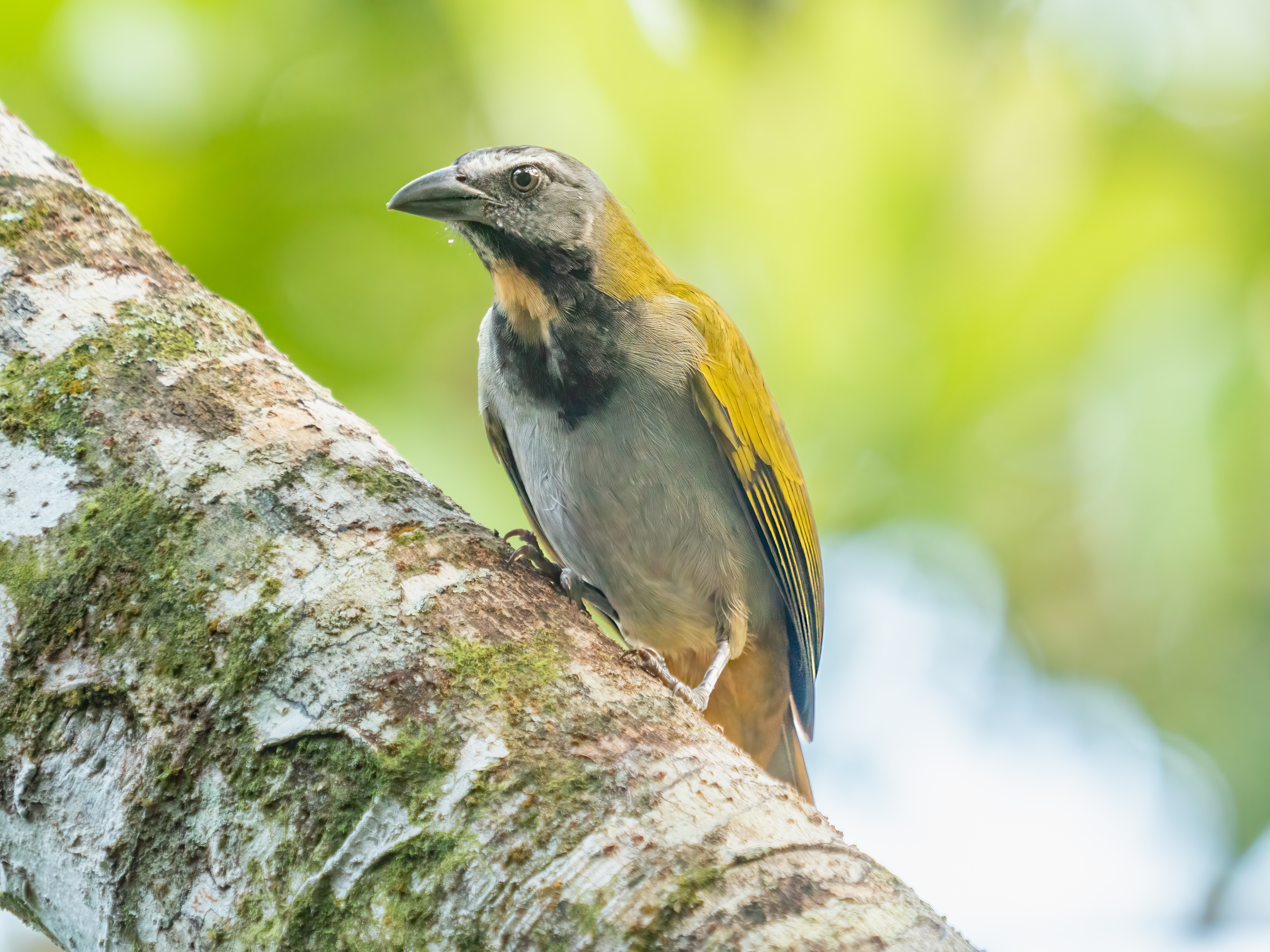

Conservation status
- Least Concern (IUCN 3.1)

Scientific classification
- Kingdom: Animalia
- Phylum: Chordata
- Class: Aves
- Order: Passeriformes
- Family: Thraupidae
- Genus: Saltator
- Species: S. maximus

Binomial name
- Saltator maximus (Müller, PLS, 1776)

Audio
- Song

= Buff-throated saltator =

Species of bird

The buff-throated saltator (Saltator maximus) is a species of bird in the family Thraupidae, the tanagers and allies. It is found in Mexico, every Central American country except El Salvador, and every mainland South American country except Argentina, Chile, Paraguay, and Uruguay.

== Taxonomy and systematics ==
The buff-throated saltator was formally described in 1776 with the binomial Tanagra maxima. It has these five subspecies:

- S. m. gigantodes Cabanis, 1851
- S. m. magnoides Lafresnaye, 1844
- S. m. intermedius Lawrence, 1864
- S. m. iungens Griscom, 1929
- S. m. maximus (Müller, PLS, 1776)

== Description ==
The buff-throated saltator is about 20 cm (7.9 in) long. Males weigh an average of about 46 g (1.6 oz) and females about 49 g (1.7 oz). The sexes have the same plumage. Adults of the nominate subspecies S. m. maximus have a mostly gray head with a greenish gray crown and a short white supercilium. Their upperparts, wings, and tail are olive-green. Their chin and upper throat are white and their lower throat buffy with a black line on each side of the full length. Their breast, belly, and flanks are gray and their lower belly and undertail coverts buffy.

The other subspecies of the buff-throated saltator differ from the nominate and each other thus:

- S. m. gigantodes: grayish crown, smaller buff throat patch, and wider black on sides of throat
- S. m. magnoides: sooty blackish forecrown and crown, dusky grayish nape, and bright yellowish olive-green upperparts; black band around sides and bottom of throat
- S. m. intermedius: black band like magnoides; buff tinge on underparts
- S. m. iungens: similar to nominate

All subspecies have a brown iris, a thick blackish or black bill, and blackish or grayish brown legs and feet.

== Distribution and habitat ==
The buff-throated saltator has a disjunct distribution. The subspecies are found thus:

- S. m. gigantodes: Gulf slope of Mexico from central Veracruz south to Tabasco and northern Oaxaca
- S. m. magnoides: from Chiapas and Quintana Roo in southern Mexico south on Caribbean slope through northern and central Guatemala, Belize, Honduras, and Nicaragua, and on the Caribbean and Pacific slopes of Costa Rica (except far northwest and far southwest) into northwestern Panama
- S. m. intermedius: from southwestern Costa Rica to the Canal Zone in Panama
- S. m. iungens: from eastern Panama into the lowlands of northwestern Colombia to the lower Cauca River valley
- S. m. maximus: Serranía del Perijá on the Colombia-Venezuela border; from eastern Colombia northeast on both slopes of the Venezuelan Andes to the Venezuelan Coastal Range from Yaracuy to Miranda; from eastern Colombia east across southern Venezuela and the Guianas; from Chocó Department in northwestern Colombia south on the western Andean slope through Ecuador just into northwestern Peru's Tumbes Department; from eastern Colombia south through eastern Ecuador and eastern Peru into northern Bolivia; from Colombia, Peru, and Bolivia east across Brazil north of a line from west-central Mato Grosso do Sul northeast to the Atlantic in Maranhão; and southeastern Brazil from Alagoas south to northern São Paulo state Though some sources include Paraguay in this subspecies' range the South American Classification Committee has no records in that country.

The buff-throated saltator primarily inhabits the edges of lowland and foothill evergreen forest in the tropical and subtropical zones, but does occur in the canopy of the interior. It also commonly is found in secondary forest, shady plantations, and brushy pastures and gardens near forest. In elevation it ranges from sea level to 1,900 m (6,200 ft) in northern Central America, to 1,800 m (5,900 ft) in Costa Rica and Colombia, mostly to 900 m (3,000 ft) in Ecuador, to 1,750 m (5,700 ft) in Peru, and to 1,200 m (3,900 ft) in Brazil. In Venezuela it is found below 1,650 m (5,400 ft) north of the Orinoco River and below 1,400 m (4,600 ft) south of it.

== Behavior ==
=== Movement ===
The buff-throated saltator is a year-round resident.

=== Feeding ===
The buff-throated saltator feeds primarily on plant material like fruit, flowers, and nectar, and also includes insects in its diet. In Chiapas, Mexico, it has been observed feeding on the fruits of Cymbopetalum mayanum (Annonaceae), Trophis racemosa (Moraceae), and gumbo-limbo (Bursera simaruba). It typically forages at the forest edge, moving only a short distance into the forest to feed. It is usually seen in pairs and often in mixed-species feeding flocks.

=== Breeding ===
The buff-throated saltator's breeding season has not been fully defined. It spans March to August in Costa Rica, at least April to July in Panama, and February to August in Suriname. Its nest is a bulky cup made from plant material and is usually in a bush or tree between about 0.3 and 2 m (1 and 7 ft) above the ground but sometimes is as high as 9 m (30 ft). In Costa Rica the clutch is two eggs but in the Guianas might be three. The eggs are described as similar to those of the masked saltator (S. coerulescens), which are bluish green with sparse black markings. In Costa Rica the female alone incubates, usually for 13 or 14 days. Fledging occurs 13 to 15 days after hatch and both parents provision nestlings.

=== Vocalization ===
One description of the buff-throated saltator's song is a "long series of variations on high tjúrewur witjewúr". Another is "a series of electric chatters, TSEEUT-SEET-TEEU-TU-TU'TU'TU'CH'CH'CH'E'E'E'E'E'E". A third is "a mellow caroling...each song phrase a little different than the previous until ending in a querying phrase, then repeats: will-cheeloo will-cheelo will-cheeloo wee-alee? will-cheeloo". Its calls include "a high squeak followed by a warble: tseet! cheeolee-cheelow...a metallic tick, a high seek, and a mewing CHEEluloo".

== Status ==
The IUCN has assessed the buff-throated saltator as being of Least Concern. It has an extremely large range; its estimated population of at least five million mature individuals is believed to be decreasing. No immediate threats have been identified. It is considered "frequent to uncommon" overall in Mexico through Central America but common between Mexico and Nicaragua. It is uncommon in Costa Rica's northwest and the western Central Valley and common elsewhere in the country. It is common in Venezuela and Colombia, "generally common" in the Ecuadorean lowlands and less common at higher elevations, "fairly common and widespread" in most of Peru but uncommon in Tumbes, and "common to frequent" in Brazil.
