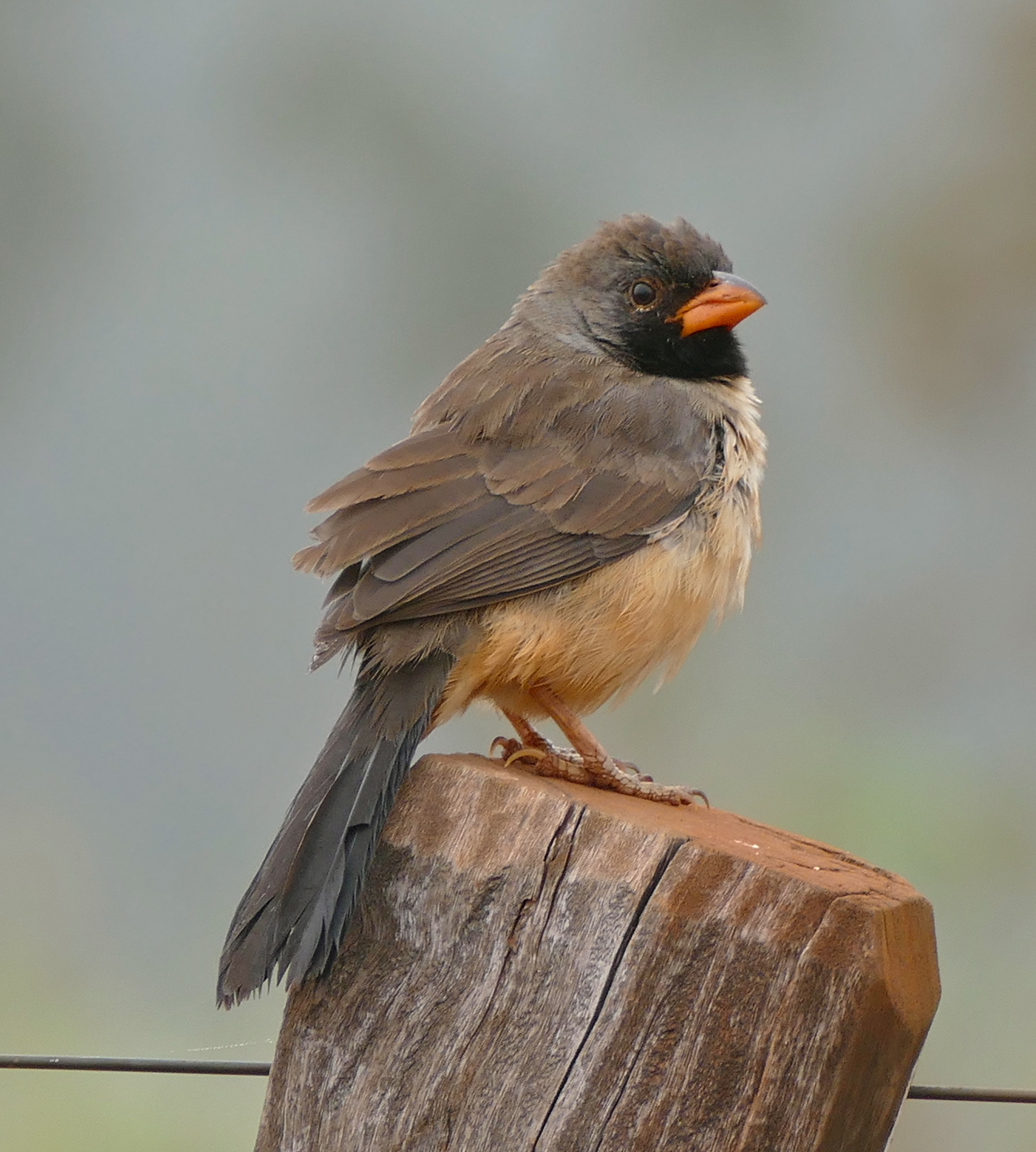
- In Poconé, Mato Grosso, Brazil

Conservation status
- Least Concern (IUCN 3.1)

Scientific classification
- Kingdom: Animalia
- Phylum: Chordata
- Class: Aves
- Order: Passeriformes
- Family: Thraupidae
- Genus: Saltatricula
- Species: S. atricollis

Binomial name
- Saltatricula atricollis (Vieillot, 1817)

Synonyms
- Saltator atricollis (protonym)

= Black-throated saltator =

Species of songbird

The black-throated saltator (Saltatricula atricollis) is a species of bird in the family Thraupidae, the tanagers and allies. It is found in Bolivia, Brazil, and Paraguay.

== Taxonomy and systematics ==
The black-throated saltator was formally described in 1817 with the binomial Saltator atricollis. Most taxonomic systems had assigned it to its current genus Saltatricula by the 2020s. However, as of late 2025 BirdLife International's Handbook of the Birds of the World (HBW) retains it in Saltator.

All of the systems agree that the species is monotypic.

== Description ==
The black-throated saltator is 20 to 20.5 cm (7.9 to 8.1 in) long; one male weighed 53.8 g (1.9 oz). The sexes have the same plumage. Adults have a black face, chin, and throat and brownish gray ear coverts. Their forehead, crown, nape, upperparts, and wings are dark brown with lighter edges on the feathers. Their tail is dark brown with faint darker bars. Their breast is pale buffy gray that becomes a warmer buff on the belly, flanks, and vent. They have a chocolate-brown iris, a thick orange bill with a blackish culmen, and light brown legs and feet. Juveniles have buff edges on their throat feathers and a dark bill.

== Distribution and habitat ==
The black-throated saltator is found primarily in eastern Brazil south of a line from southern Rondônia east to southern Tocantins then northeast to the Atlantic in northern Maranhão. Its southern boundary is from southern Mato Grosso do Sul east to southern Minas Gerais and then northeast to the Atlantic in northern Ceará. Its range in the west omits far southwestern Mato Grosso and western Mato Grosso do Sul. From Brazil its range extends west into northern and eastern Bolivia and southwest into northeastern Paraguay.

The black-throated saltator inhabits dry scrublands in caatinga and cerrado. In elevation in Brazil it ranges between 700 and 1,300 m (2,300 and 4,300 ft).

== Behavior ==
=== Movement ===
The black-throated saltator is believed to be a year-round resident.

=== Feeding ===
The black-throated saltator's diet has not been studied but is known to include seeds, flower buds, fruit, and invertebrates. It forages mostly on the ground and usually as a member of a mixed-species feeding flock.

=== Breeding ===
The black-throated saltator's breeding biology is known only from Minas Gerais. There its breeding season includes March, April, and October which "suggests that [the] species possibly at least double-brooded". There is also some evidence that pairs have helpers. Two nests were cups made from grass; one was on the ground beside a clump of grass and the other about 1 m (3 ft) above the ground in a bush. The clutch is two eggs that are blue or greenish white with dull brown or black markings. The incubation period, time to fledging, and details of parental care are not known.

=== Vocalization ===
The black-throated saltator's song is a "very high, hurried, mellow warbling weet-jewir-p-weetjewir" that lasts about three seconds. Its call is "high bits" that sound like clicking pebbles.

== Status ==
The IUCN has assessed the black-throated saltator as being of Least Concern. It has a very large range; its population size and trend are not known. No immediate threats have been identified. It is considered "frequent to uncommon" in Brazil. It is found in some national parks.
