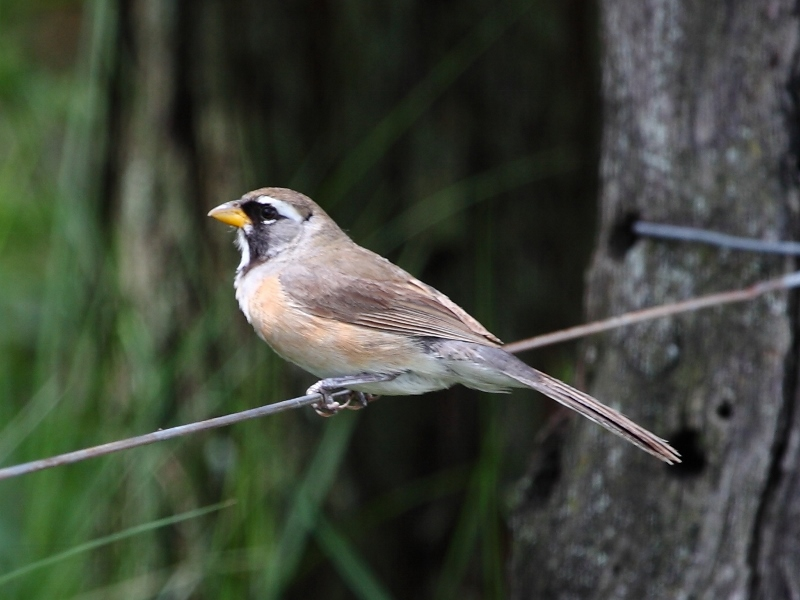
- Many-colored Chaco finch at Capivara, Santa Fe Province, Argentina

Conservation status
- Least Concern (IUCN 3.1)

Scientific classification
- Kingdom: Animalia
- Phylum: Chordata
- Class: Aves
- Order: Passeriformes
- Family: Thraupidae
- Genus: Saltatricula
- Species: S. multicolor

Binomial name
- Saltatricula multicolor (Burmeister, KHK, 1860)

= Many-colored Chaco finch =

Species of bird

The many-colored Chaco finch (Saltatricula multicolor) is a species of bird in the family Thraupidae, the tanagers and allies. It is found in Argentina, Bolivia, Uruguay, Paraguay, and as a vagrant in Brazil.

== Taxonomy and systematics ==
The many-colored Chaco finch was formally described by Hermann Burmeister in 1860 with the binomial Saltator multicolor. A year later Burmeister erected the genus Saltatricula with multicolor as the type species. The genus spent time in the family Emberizidae before being moved to its present family Thraupidae in the early 2000s.

The many-colored Chaco finch's taxonomy is not settled as of August 2026. Most taxonomic systems retain it in Saltatricula. However, BirdLife International's Handbook of the Birds of the World (HBW) moved it from that genus back to Saltator in 2016.

All of the systems agree that the species is monotypic.

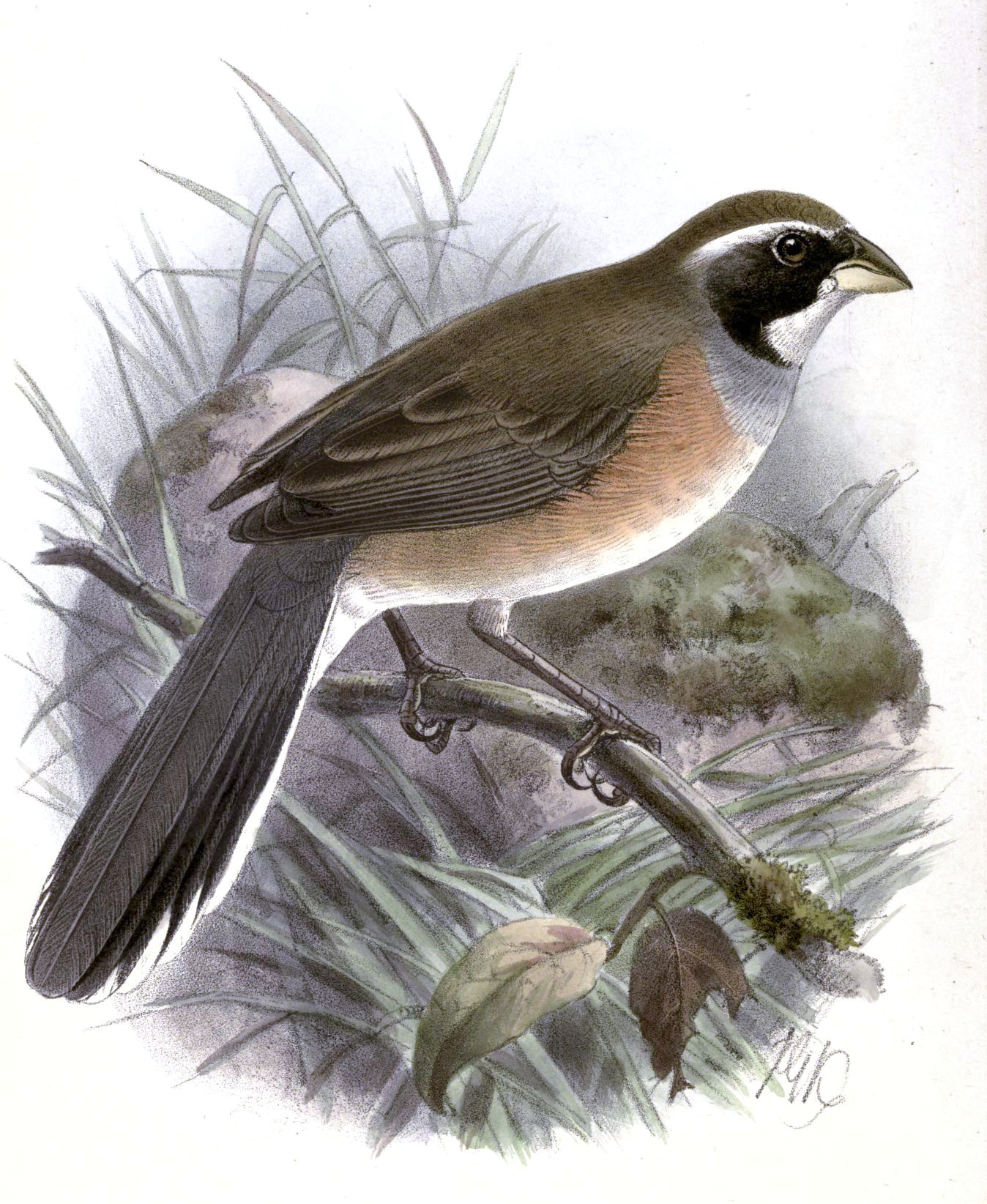
Saltatricula multicolor by Keulemans, 1889

== Description ==
The many-colored Chaco finch is 17 cm (6.7 in) to 18 cm (7.1 in) long. It weighs 20 to 25 g (0.71 to 0.88 oz). The sexes have essentially the same plumage though females are generally slightly duller than males and have a paler face. Adult males have a black face from the lores to the eye and down the cheek to the side of the neck. They have a white supercilium that begins wide just past the eye and tapers to the rear. They have a small white spot at the base of the bill, a thin white arc below the eye, and gray ear coverts. Their throat is white Their crown and nape are brown, their mantle and upper back pale brown washed with olive, and their lower back, rump, and uppertail coverts gray. Their wing coverts are grayish or grayish brown and their flight feathers and tertials grayish with pale brown edges. Their central pair of tail feathers are gray and the rest blackish with white on the distal third of the outermost pair. The gray of the ear coverts continues down and around the upper breast. Below the gray breast band is a cinnamon-buff band that extends along their sides onto the flanks. The rest of their underparts are white. Both sexes have a dark iris, a thick bright yellow bill with a darker culmen, and dusky legs and feet.

== Distribution and habitat ==
The many-colored Chaco finch is found from Santa Cruz, Chuquisaca and Tarija departments in southeastern Bolivia south through western Paraguay into northern Argentina to a line between San Luis and Entre Ríos provinces, and from Argentina east into northwestern Uruguay. It has also been documented as a vagrant in southwestern Brazil. It is a species of the Gran Chaco, where it inhabits the edges of open woodland and shrubby grasslands.

== Behavior ==
=== Movement ===
The many-colored Chaco finch is almost entirely a year-round resident. However some partial migration is suspected because the species' abundance varies seasonally in Bolivia.

=== Feeding ===
The many-colored Chaco finch's diet has not been studied but appears to include insects and seeds. It forages on the ground and in low vegetation, typically in pairs and in small flocks that include other finches.

=== Breeding ===
The many-colored Chaco finch breeds between November and March. Its nest is a cup made from dry grass and other plant fibers attached to leaves, a grass clump, or twigs from a little above the ground to about 1.2 m (4 ft) up. The clutch is three eggs that are white with blackish markings. The incubation period, time to fledging, and details of parental care are not known. The shiny cowbird (Molothrus bonariensis) is a common brood parasite.

=== Vocalization ===
The many-colored Chaco finch's song is a "piree-weeroo-weeroo repeated 10 or more times". Its calls include "a dull-sounding chup, often doubled as chu-chup [and a] higher-pitched swiip".

== Status ==
The IUCN has assessed the many-colored Chaco finch as being of Least Concern. It has a large range; its population size is not known and is believed to be decreasing. No immediate threats have been identified. It is considered "[c]ommon to abundant throughout most parts of [its] range".
