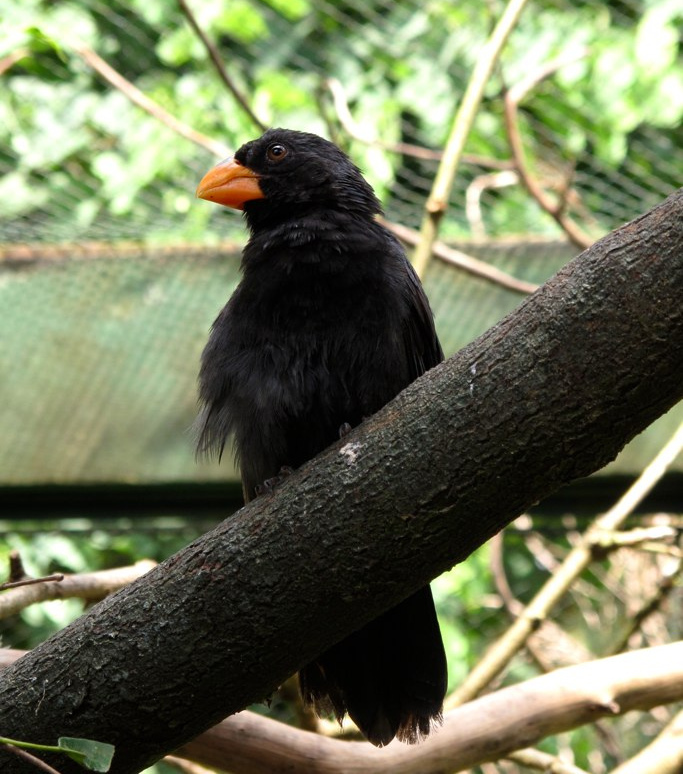
- Adult male at Pomerode Zoo in Santa Catarina, Brazil

Conservation status
- Least Concern (IUCN 3.1)

Scientific classification
- Kingdom: Animalia
- Phylum: Chordata
- Class: Aves
- Order: Passeriformes
- Family: Thraupidae
- Genus: Saltator
- Species: S. fuliginosus

Binomial name
- Saltator fuliginosus (Daudin, 1800)

Synonyms
- see text

= Black-throated grosbeak =

Species of bird

The black-throated grosbeak (Saltator fuliginosus) is a species of bird in the family Thraupidae, the tanagers and allies. It is found in Argentina, Brazil, and Paraguay.

== Taxonomy and systematics ==
The black-throated grosbeak was formally described in 1800 with the binomial Loxia fuliginosa. For a time it and the slate-colored grosbeak (S. grossus) were placed in the genus Pitylus, and some authors treated them as conspecific. They are sister species and some authors consider them a superspecies.

The black-throated grosbeak is monotypic.

== Description ==
The black-throated grosbeak is 20 cm (7.9 in) to 22 cm (8.7 in) long. The species is sexually dimorphic though the sexes are similar. Adult males are mostly deep slate-blue. Their lores, face, ear coverts, throat, and upper breast are black. Their wings are black with deep slate blue feather edges and their tail is uniformly black. Their underwing coverts are white. Adult females are overall duller than males with less blue in their upperparts and less of a contrast between the upper and lower breast. Both sexes have a dark brown iris, a bright coral-red bill, and dark gray legs and feet. Juveniles are duller and less blue than adults with sometimes a dark culmen.

The species closely resembles it sister slate-colored grosbeak, which however is grayer and has less black on the face and a white throat.

== Distribution and habitat ==
The black-throated grosbeak has a disjunct distribution with one large range and two small ones. Its main range is primarily in southeastern Brazil from southern Bahia and eastern Minas Gerais south to northern Rio Grande do Sul and continuing west to northeastern Argentina's Misiones Province and at least historically also into southeastern Paraguay. A small range is in eastern Pernambuco and Alagoas in northeastern Brazil and another in Goiás in south-central Brazil. There are also a few scattered records in northern Brazil.

The black-throated grosbeak is a bird of the humid Atlantic Forest.

== Behavior ==
=== Movement ===
The black-throated grosbeak is believed to be a year-round resident.

=== Feeding ===
The black-throated grosbeak's diet has not been studied. It usually forages from the forest's mid-story to its canopy.

=== Breeding ===
The black-throated grosbeak's eggs are described as greenish blue. The shiny cowbird (Molothrus bonariensis) is a brood parasite. The species' breeding season, nest, incubation period, time to fledging, and details of parental care are not known.

=== Vocalization ===
The black-throated grosbeak's song is "often in two parts with [a] long interval, Weétju-pjerur thur -wur wír" whose Weét and wír have the highest pitch.

== Status ==
The IUCN has assessed the black-throated grosbeak as being of Least Concern. It has a large range; its population size and trend are not known. No immediate threats have been identified. It is considered "uncommon to rare" in Brazil. "Much of this species’ original habitat has been destroyed for agriculture or development." There are no records in Paraguay since the early twentieth century.
