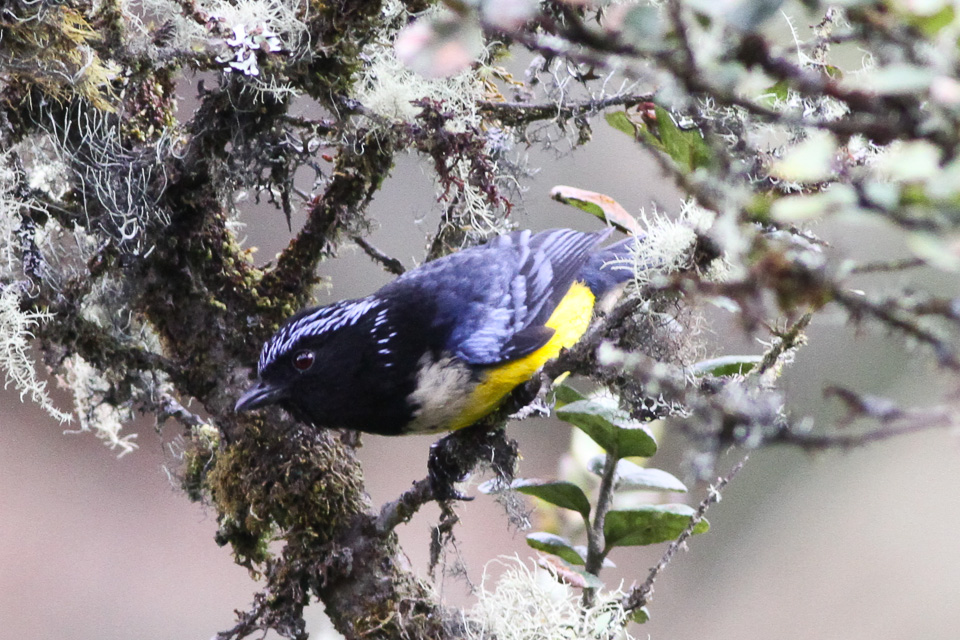

Conservation status
- Least Concern (IUCN 3.1)

Scientific classification
- Kingdom: Animalia
- Phylum: Chordata
- Class: Aves
- Order: Passeriformes
- Family: Thraupidae
- Genus: Dubusia
- Species: D. taeniata

Binomial name
- Dubusia taeniata (Boissonneau, 1840)

= Buff-banded mountain tanager =

Buff-breasted mountain tanager

Species of bird

The buff-banded mountain tanager (Dubusia taeniata), formerly known as the buff-breasted mountain tanager, is a species of Neotropical bird in the tanager family Thraupidae.

It is found in Bolivia, Colombia, Ecuador, Peru, and Venezuela. Its natural habitat is subtropical or tropical moist montane forests.

== Taxonomy ==
The buff-banded mountain tanager was formally described in 1840 by the French ornithologist Auguste Boissonneau from a specimen collected near Bogotá in Colombia. He coined the binomial name Tanagra taeniata. The specific epithet is the Latin word for a "head-band". This species is now placed in the genus Dubusia that was introduced in 1850 by the French naturalist Charles Lucien Bonaparte.

The streak-crowned mountain tanager and Carriker's mountain tanager were previously treated as subspecies of the buff-banded mountain tanager. They are currently recognized as separate species. Before the split the buff-banded mountain tanager was known as the buff-breasted mountain tanager.

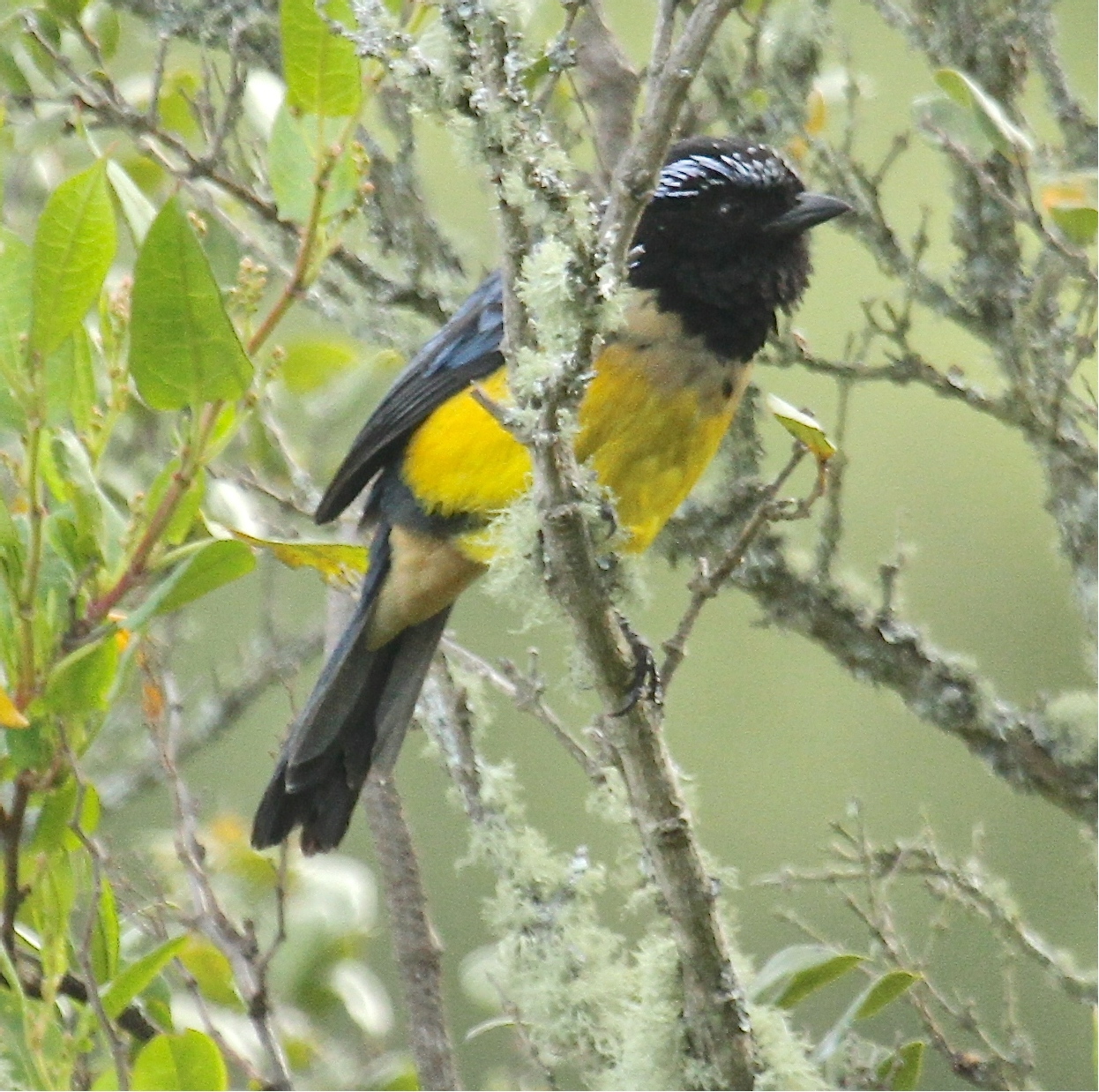
Papallacta Pass, Ecuador
