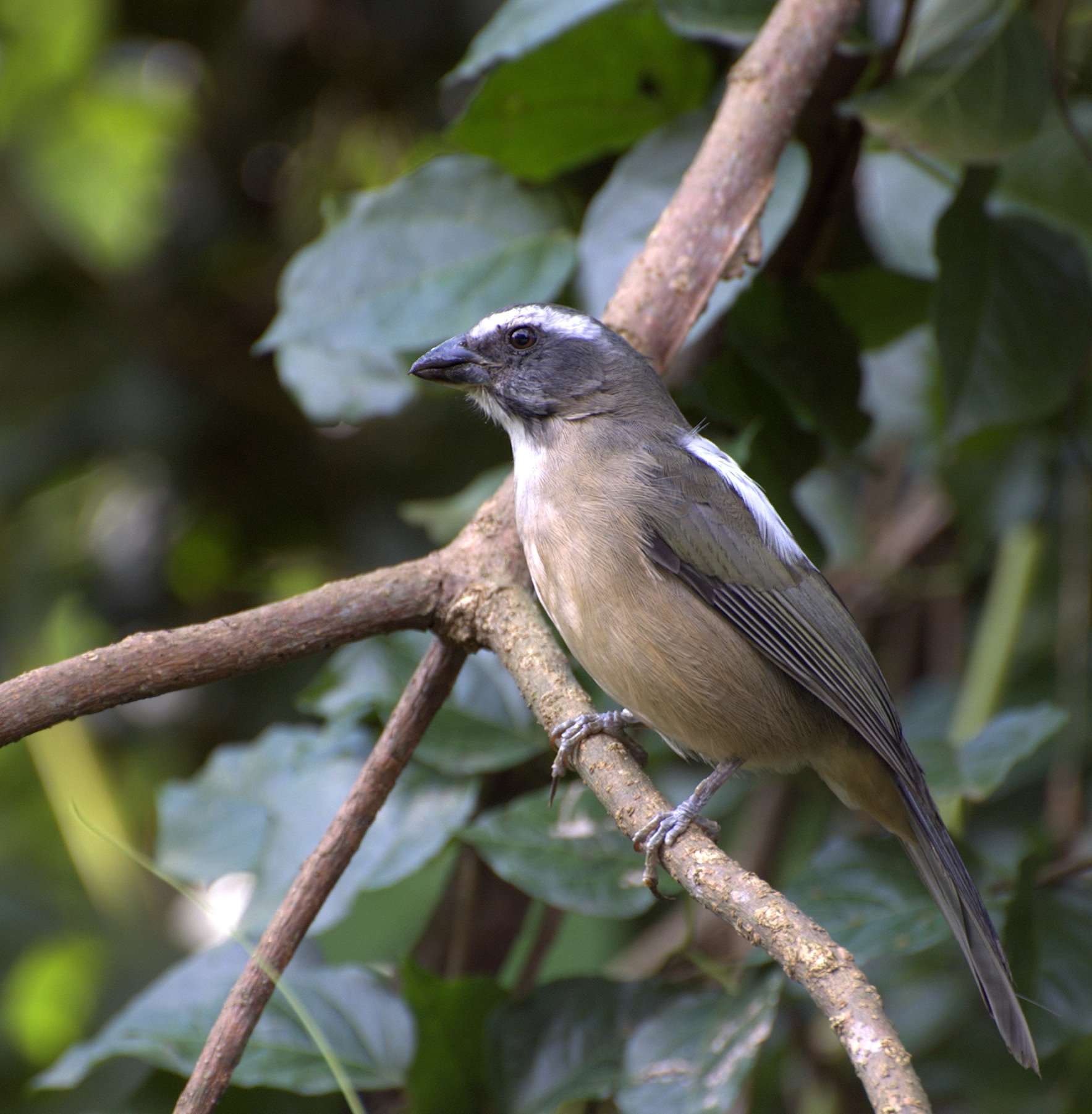
- Individual with abnormal white (leucism) on its back

Conservation status
- Least Concern (IUCN 3.1)

Scientific classification
- Kingdom: Animalia
- Phylum: Chordata
- Class: Aves
- Order: Passeriformes
- Family: Thraupidae
- Genus: Saltator
- Species: S. similis

Binomial name
- Saltator similis D'Orbigny & Lafresnaye, 1837

= Green-winged saltator =

Species of bird

The green-winged saltator (Saltator similis) is a species of saltator in the family Thraupidae. It is found in Argentina, Bolivia, Brazil, Paraguay, and Uruguay, and ranges into the southern cerrado and the pantanal.

Its natural habitats are subtropical or tropical moist lowland forests and heavily degraded former forest.

== Description ==
Slightly smaller than other species of the same genus, it has the same strong black beak that gave rise to the common name of these birds. As in the Saltator maximus, it has a green back, gray tail and sides of the head. The superciliary stripe is the longest of the three species (adult bird), with the "mustache" less defined and the throat all white. Underneath, gray dominates on the sides, becoming orange brown and white in the center of the belly. The wings are greenish. The juvenile does not have such a long stripe, being the same failed or nonexistent, right after leaving the nest. Some juveniles are striped below.

Very energetic and fortified beak (which gave the name "iron crack"), with tail differentiated in size. There are no bodily differences between males and females.

Its singing varies slightly from region to region, although it maintains the same timbre.

== Taxonomy ==
It has two recognized subspecies:

- Saltator similis similis (Orbigny & Lafresnaye, 1837) - occurs from eastern Bolivia to the state of Bahia in Brazil, south to Paraguay, Uruguay, and Northeast Argentina;
- Saltator similis ochraceiventris (Berlepsch, 1912) - occurs in southeastern Brazil, from the south of the state of São Paulo to Rio Grande do Sul.

Birds Brazil CBRO - 2015 (Piacentini et al. 2015); (Clements checklist, 2014); ITIS - (Integrated Taxonomic Information System - 2015).

== Behavior ==
=== Feeding ===
Saltator similis is a typical omnivore, feeding on fruits, insects, seeds, leaves, and flowers (like those of the Ypê). It enjoys the fruits of tapiá or tanheiro (Alchornea glandulosa). The male usually brings food to the female.

=== Breeding ===
The nest, built in bushes 1 to 2 meters high, is a spacious bowl, about 12 centimeters in outer diameter, made with large dry leaves secured by some branches, resulting in a loose construction; small roots and herbs are placed inside. The 2 or 3 eggs, elongated, measure about 29 by 18 millimeters and are light blue or blue-green, with small and large spots on the blunt pole, forming a crown. During the breeding period, it lives strictly in couples, being extremely loyal to a territory.

=== Captivity ===
In Brazil, Saltator similis is appreciated by its singing abilities, with different varieties being identified by their particular singing (var. "Boi" and var. "João"). Birds are captured illegally, particularly in areas of Atlantic Forest, near urban centers, where they are traded in the black market. IBAMA has been effective in curbing such practices and the number of illegal birds captured has decreased from 2000 to 2014. However, with cuts in budget, and therefore less fiscalization, the numbers can be much higher [data needed].

== Distribution and habitat ==
It lives in edges of forests and clearings. It is always associated with forests, occupying the middle and upper strata. It is distributed in the central part of Brazil and the northeast, in Bahia in the south of the country, Rio Grande do Sul and throughout the Southeast region, in addition to neighboring international borders, such as Argentina, Bolivia, Paraguay and Uruguay.
