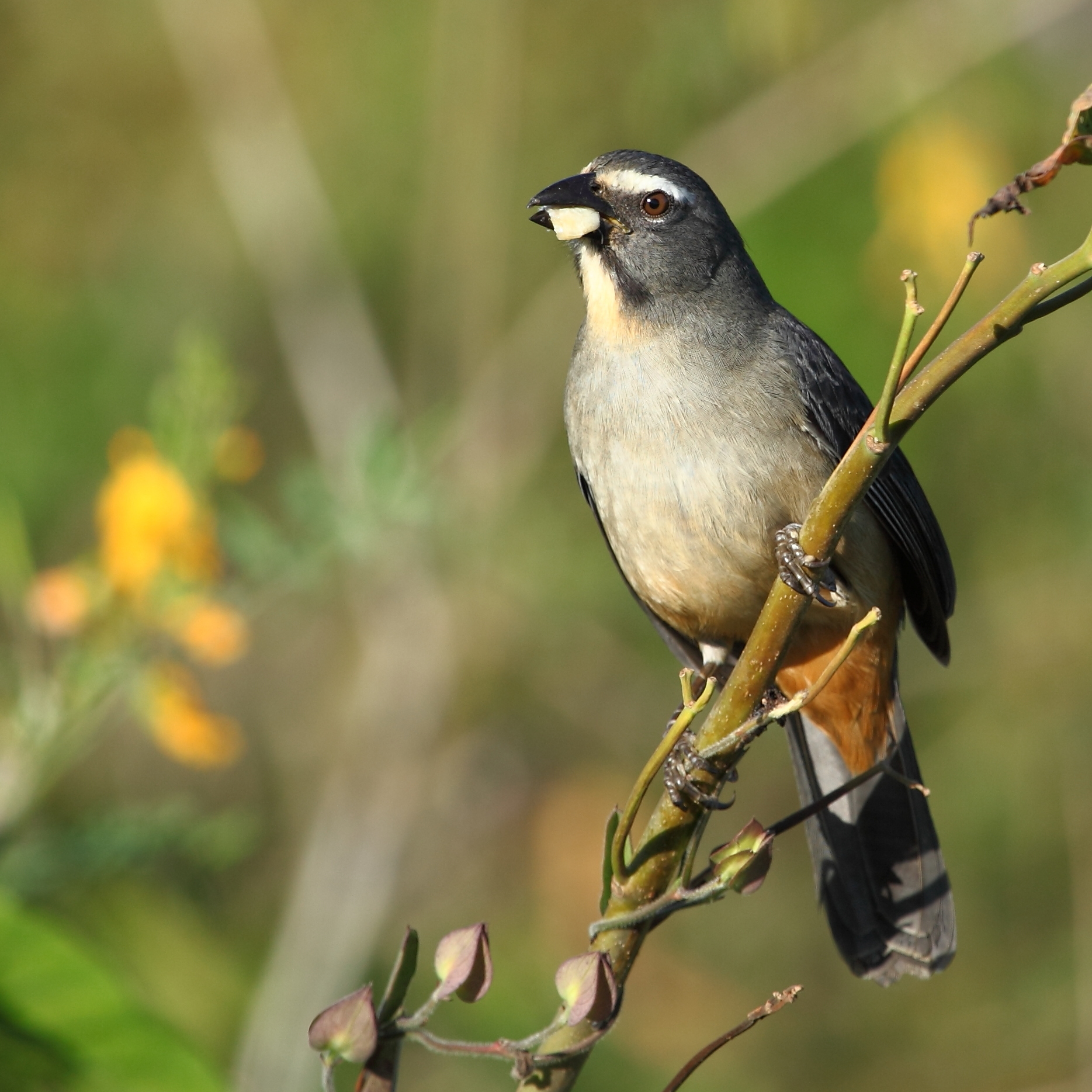
- Bluish-grey saltator Saltator coerulescens

Scientific classification
- Kingdom: Animalia
- Phylum: Chordata
- Class: Aves
- Order: Passeriformes
- Family: Thraupidae
- Genus: Saltator; Vieillot, 1816

Type species
- Tanagra maximus Statius Muller, 1776

Species
- Presently some 16, but see text.

= Saltator =

Genus of birds

Saltator is a genus of passerine birds in the tanager family Thraupidae that are found in Central and South America. They have thick bills, relatively long tails and strong legs and feet. Before the introduction of molecular genetic methods in the 21st century these species were placed in the cardinal family Cardinalidae.

== Taxonomy ==
The genus was introduced by the French ornithologist Louis Pierre Vieillot in 1816 with the buff-throated saltator as the type species. The name is from the Latin saltator, saltatoris meaning "dancer".

The saltators were traditionally grouped with the cardinals, either in the subfamily Cardinalinae within an expanded Emberizidae or in a separate family Cardinalidae. Molecular phylogenetic studies have shown that the saltators are embedded within the tanager family Thraupidae. Within the Thraupidae the genus Saltator is now placed with the genus Saltatricula in the subfamily Saltatorinae. The relationship of the subfamily to the other subfamilies within the Thraupidae is uncertain.

The genus contains the following 16 species:

Image	Common name	Scientific name	Distribution
	Orinoco saltator	Saltator orenocensis	Venezuela, northeast Colombia
	Green-winged saltator	Saltator similis	Argentina, Bolivia, Brazil, Paraguay, and Uruguay
	Cinnamon-bellied (or northern grey) saltator	Saltator grandis	Mexico to Panama
	Olive-grey (or Caribbean grey) saltator	Saltator olivascens	Colombia, Venezuela, the Guianas, far north Brazil and Trinidad
	Bluish-grey (or Amazonian grey) saltator	Saltator coerulescens	Widely in tropical and subtropical South America
	Streaked saltator	Saltator striatipectus	Colombia, Costa Rica, Ecuador, Guadeloupe, Panama, Peru, and Venezuela.
	Lesser Antillean saltator	Saltator albicollis	Dominica, Martinique, Saint Kitts and Nevis, and Saint Lucia.
	Buff-throated saltator	Saltator maximus	southeastern Mexico to western Ecuador and northeastern Brazil.
	Black-winged saltator	Saltator atripennis	Colombia and Ecuador.
	Black-headed saltator	Saltator atriceps	central Mexico to eastern Panama.
	Black-cowled saltator	Saltator nigriceps	Ecuador and the northern border region of Peru.
	Black-throated grosbeak	Saltator fuliginosus	Atlantic Forest in far northeastern Argentina (Misiones), eastern and southeastern Brazil, and far eastern Paraguay
	Slate-coloured grosbeak	Saltator grossus	the Amazon in South America, but it is also found in forests of the Chocó in Ecuador and Colombia, and southern Central America from Panama to Honduras.
	Masked saltator	Saltator cinctus	southern Colombia, Ecuador, and Peru.
	Thick-billed saltator	Saltator maxillosus	Atlantic Forest in southeastern Brazil, far northeastern Argentina (only Misiones Province), and perhaps far eastern Paraguay.
	Golden-billed saltator	Saltator aurantiirostris	Argentina, Bolivia, Brazil, Chile, Paraguay, Peru, and Uruguay

The rufous-bellied mountain saltator was formerly a member of this genus. It is now placed in the subfamily Thraupinae and is the only member of the genus Pseudosaltator. Its common name has been changed to rufous-bellied mountain tanager. The black-throated saltator was also formerly assigned to this genus. It is now placed together with the many-colored Chaco finch in the genus Saltatricula as the two species form a divergent clade that is sister to the other members of Saltator.
