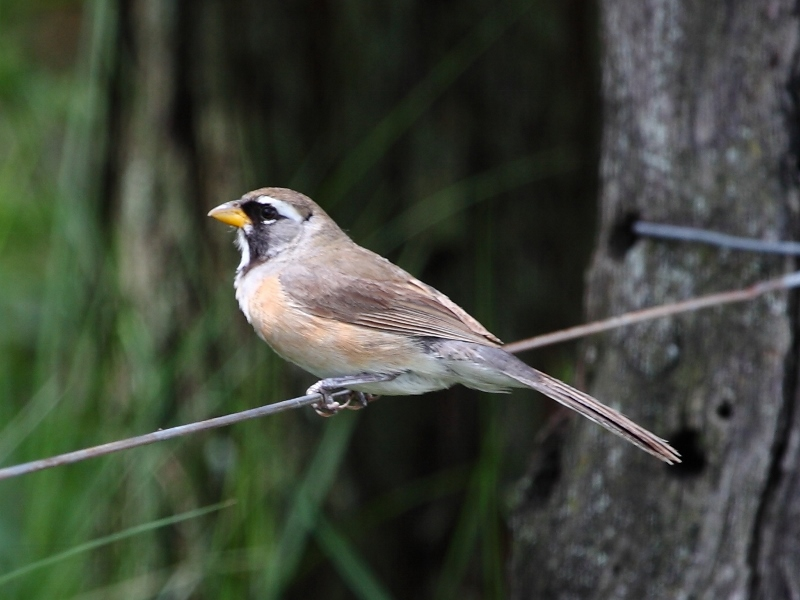
- Many-colored Chaco finch (Saltatricula multicolor)

Scientific classification
- Kingdom: Animalia
- Phylum: Chordata
- Class: Aves
- Order: Passeriformes
- Family: Thraupidae
- Genus: Saltatricula; Burmeister, 1861

Type species
- Saltatricula multicolor Burmeister, 1861

Species
- 2, see text

= Saltatricula =

Genus of birds

Saltatricula is a genus of South American seed-eating birds in the tanager family Thraupidae.

== Taxonomy and species list ==
The genus Saltatricula was introduced in 1861 by the German naturalist Hermann Burmeister with the many-colored Chaco finch as the type species. The name is a Latin diminutive of the genus Saltator that had been introduced by Louis Pierre Vieillot in 1816.

The black-throated saltator was formerly included in the genus Saltator. It was moved Saltatricula based on the results of a molecular phylogenetic study published in 2014 that found that the black-throated saltator was genetically distinct from the other members of the genus Saltator but was instead closely related to the many-colored Chaco finch.

The genus contains the following two species.

Genus Saltatricula – Burmeister, 1861 – two species
Common name	Scientific name and subspecies	Range	Size and ecology	IUCN status and estimated population
Many-colored Chaco finch	Saltatricula multicolor (Burmeister, 1860)	Argentina, Bolivia, Uruguay and Paraguay.	Size: Habitat: Diet:	LC
Black-throated saltator	Saltatricula atricollis (Vieillot, 1817)	Bolivia, Brazil, and Paraguay.	Size: Habitat: Diet:	LC
