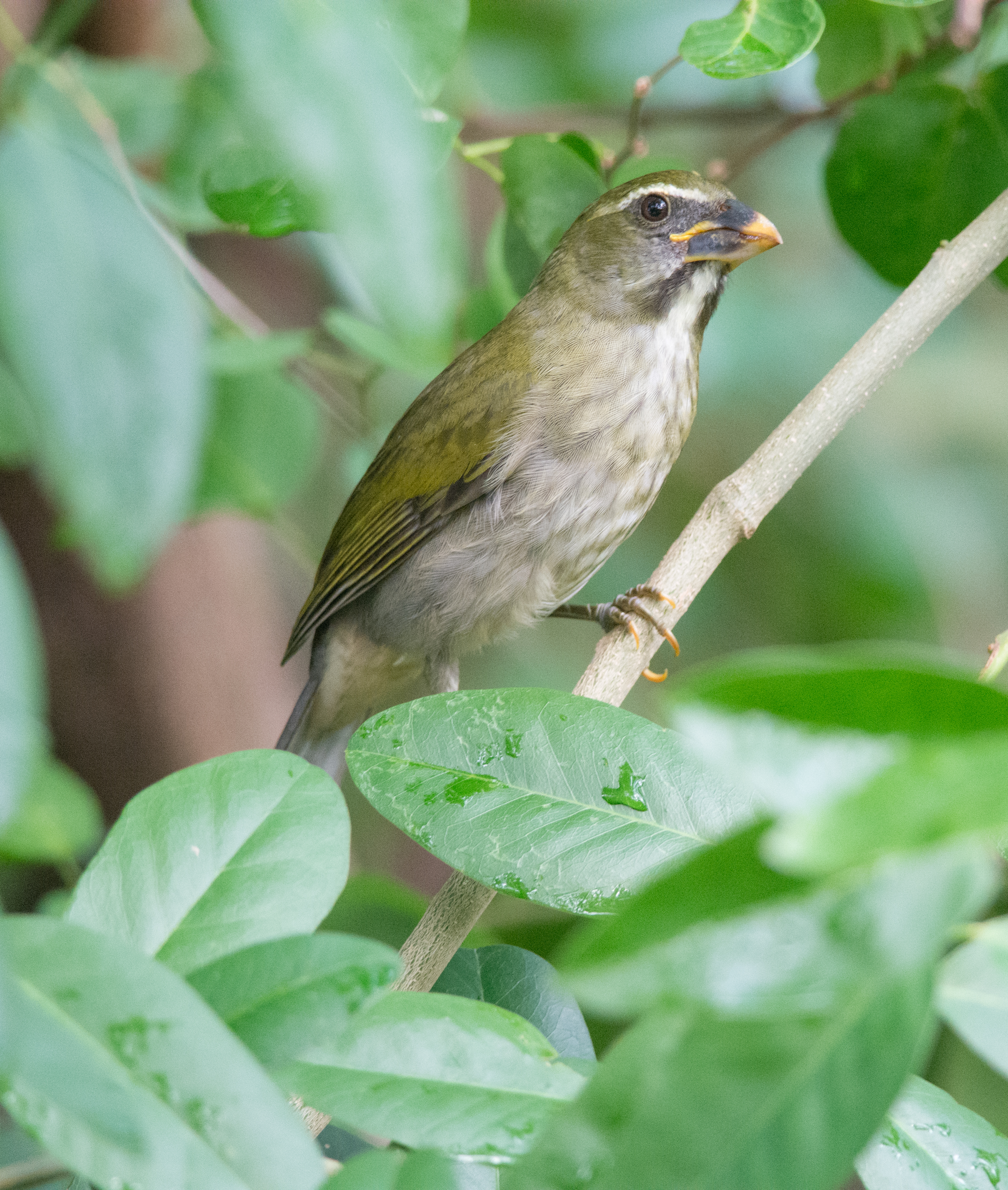

Conservation status
- Least Concern (IUCN 3.1)

Scientific classification
- Kingdom: Animalia
- Phylum: Chordata
- Class: Aves
- Order: Passeriformes
- Family: Thraupidae
- Genus: Saltator
- Species: S. albicollis

Binomial name
- Saltator albicollis Vieillot, 1817

= Lesser Antillean saltator =

Species of bird

The Lesser Antillean saltator (Saltator albicollis) is a species of songbird in the family Thraupidae, the tanagers and allies. It is found in Dominica, Guadeloupe, Martinique, and Saint Lucia.

== Taxonomy and systematics ==
The Lesser Antillean saltator was formally described as Saltator albicollis by the French ornithologist Louis Pierre Vieillot in 1817. Vieillot erroneously reported the type locality of his specimen as Cayenne, the then-current name for what is now French Guiana, but it was later corrected to Martinique. The specific epithet albicollis is derived from the Latin "albus" meaning "white" and "collum" meaning "necked". For a time it and the streaked saltator (S. striatipectus) were considered conspecific.

The Lesser Antillean saltator has two subspecies, the nominate S. a. albicollis (Vieillot, 1817) and S. a. guadelupensis (Lafresnaye, 1844).

== Description ==
The Lesser Antillean saltator is 21 to 22 cm (8.3 to 8.7 in) long and weighs about 37 to 52 g (1.3 to 1.8 oz). The sexes have the same plumage. Adults of the nominate subspecies have a deep olive-green crown, nape, and back and a grayish lower back and rump. They have a thin greenish white supercilium and mottled gray lores, face, and ear coverts. Their upperwing coverts are deep olive-green, the flight feathers are blackish gray with olive-green edges on the outer webs, and the tertials have fully olive-green outer webs. Their tail is gray-brown. Their throat is pale greenish white with a darker streak on each side. Their breast and belly are dull olive with fuzzy darker streaks, their flanks grayish, and their vent buffy. Subspecies S. a. guadelupensis is sometimes indistinguishable from the nominate. However, its underparts are usually darker and more yellowish tawny. Both subspecies have a dark brown iris, a blackish bill with a yellow tip and gape, and brown legs and feet.

== Distribution and habitat ==
The Lesser Antillean saltator is found on four islands. Subspecies S. a. guadelupensis is the more northerly of the two; it is found on Guadeloupe and Dominica. The nominate is found on Martinique and Saint Lucia. It has also been recorded as a vagrant on Nevis though it might have had captive origin. The species primarily inhabits dry scrubby landscapes in the tropical and lower subtropical zones. It also occurs in mangroves and several forest types from dry to humid. In elevation it ranges from sea level to 500 m (1,600 ft).

== Behavior ==
=== Movement ===
The Lesser Antillean saltator is a year-round resident.

=== Feeding ===
The Lesser Antillean saltator feeds primarily on plant material including fruits, buds, and flowers; its diet also includes smaller amounts of insects. It usually forages in pairs.

=== Breeding ===
The Lesser Antillean saltator breeds between February and August with most activity in May and June. Its nest is a deep cup made of twigs and leaves and placed in a bush or tree between about 2.5 and 4.5 m (8 and 15 ft) above the ground. The clutch is two or three eggs that are light greenish blue with black markings. The incubation period and time to fledging are not known. Both parents provision nestlings.

=== Vocalization ===
The Lesser Antillean saltator's song is "a series of rather loud, harsh, rising and falling notes".

== Status ==
The IUCN has assessed the Lesser Antillean saltator as being of Least Concern. It has a small range; its population size is not known but is believed to be stable. No immediate threats have been identified. It is considered common throughout its range.
