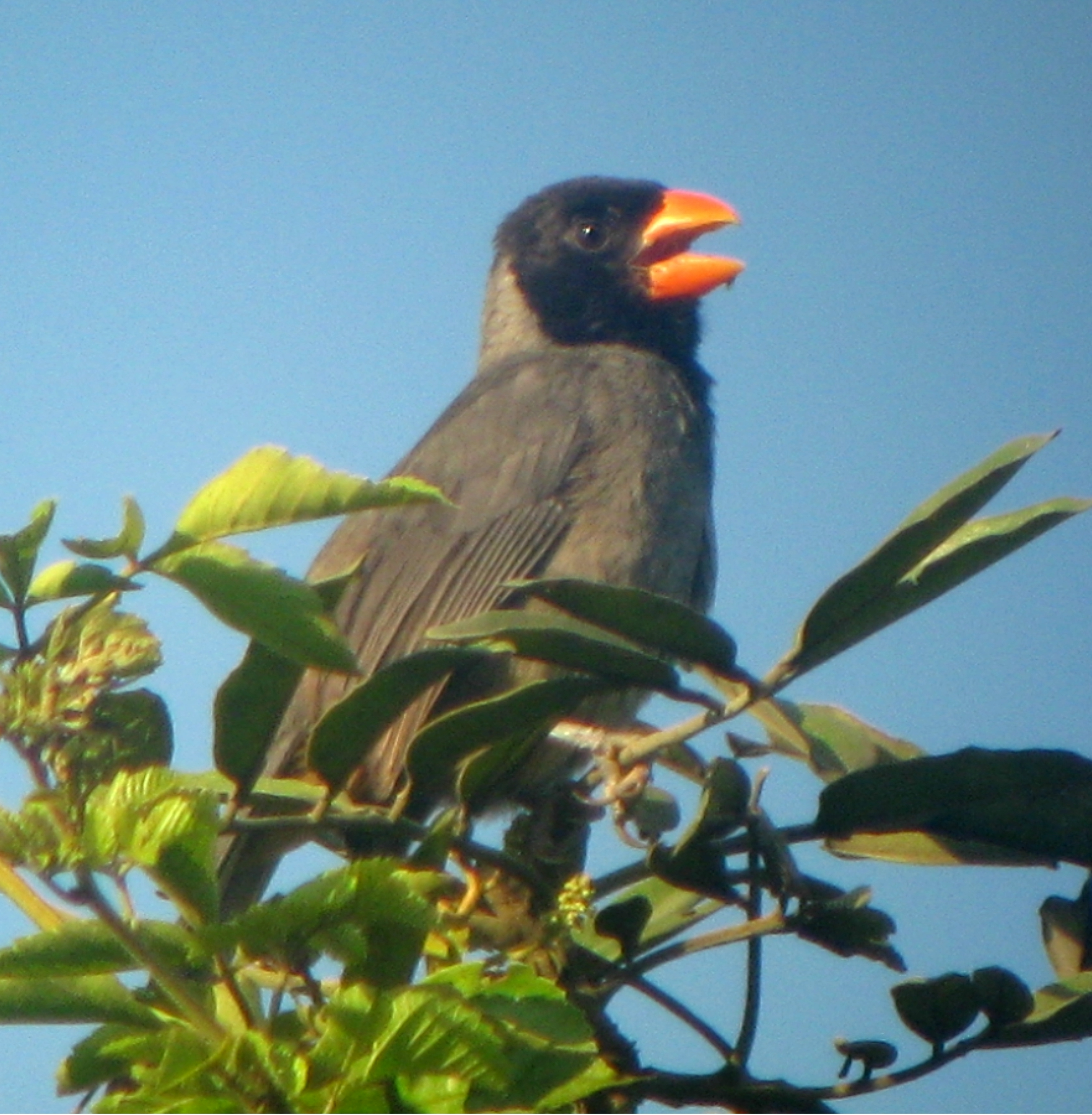

Conservation status
- Least Concern (IUCN 3.1)

Scientific classification
- Kingdom: Animalia
- Phylum: Chordata
- Class: Aves
- Order: Passeriformes
- Family: Thraupidae
- Genus: Saltator
- Species: S. nigriceps

Binomial name
- Saltator nigriceps (Chapman, 1914)

Synonyms
- Pitylus nigriceps (protonym)

= Black-cowled saltator =

Species of bird

The black-cowled saltator (Saltator nigriceps) is a species of bird in the family Thraupidae, the tanagers and allies. It is found in Ecuador and Peru.

== Taxonomy and systematics ==
The black-cowled saltator was formally described by Frank Chapman 1914 with the binomial Pitylus nigriceps. Chapman moved it to its present genus Saltator in 1927. Some twentieth century authors treated it and the golden-billed saltator (S. aurantiirostris) as conspecific.

The black-cowled saltator is monotypic.

== Description ==
The black-cowled saltator is 22 cm (8.7 in) long; two females weighed 70 and 72 g (2.5 and 2.5 oz). The sexes have the same plumage. Adults have a mostly black head, neck, and throat with a deep gray nape. Their upperparts are deep gray with a faint olive wash that darkens to the rump. Their wings are deep gray with dusky inner webs on the remiges. Their tail is mostly deep gray with white tips on the inner webs at the ends of the two outermost pairs of feathers. Their breast and upper belly are deep gray, their lower belly warm buff, and their undertail coverts ochraceous buff. They have a chestnut brown or brown iris, a thick salmon red to yellow-orange bill, and brown, gray, or horn blue legs and feet.

== Distribution and habitat ==
The black-cowled saltator is found along the western slope of the Andes from far eastern El Oro Province and the eastern half of Loja Province in southwestern Ecuador south into northern Peru to south-central Cajamarca Department. It inhabits the canopy and edges of humid montane forest, dense secondary forest, and scrublands. In elevation it ranges mostly between 1,700 and 2,900 m (5,600 and 9,500 ft) in Ecuador and between 1,200 and 2,500 m (3,900 and 8,200 ft) in Peru.

== Behavior ==
=== Movement ===
The black-cowled saltator is a year-round resident.

=== Feeding ===
The black-cowled saltator's diet has not been studied. It is assume to feed on berries, seeds, and insects. It usually is seen singly or in pairs and sometimes joins mixed-species feeding flocks. It forages at most levels of the forest but primarily from its mid-level to the canopy.

=== Breeding ===
Nothing is known about the black-cowled saltator's breeding biology.

=== Vocalization ===
The black-cowled saltator's song has been described as "a ringing, explosive kurt, sweee-it!". Another author calls the song "a variable, abbreviated, high, almost screeching phrase: ''peet PEECHEW-EEZ" and its calls "a metallic ringing chee! and high tsee".

== Status ==
The IUCN has assessed the black-cowled saltator as being of Least Concern. It has a limited range; its population size and trend are not known. No immediate threats have been identified. It is considered uncommon to locally fairly common in Ecuador and uncommon in Peru. The species "remains vulnerable to habitat loss from human activities such as clearing of forest for agriculture, firewood harvesting, and mining".
