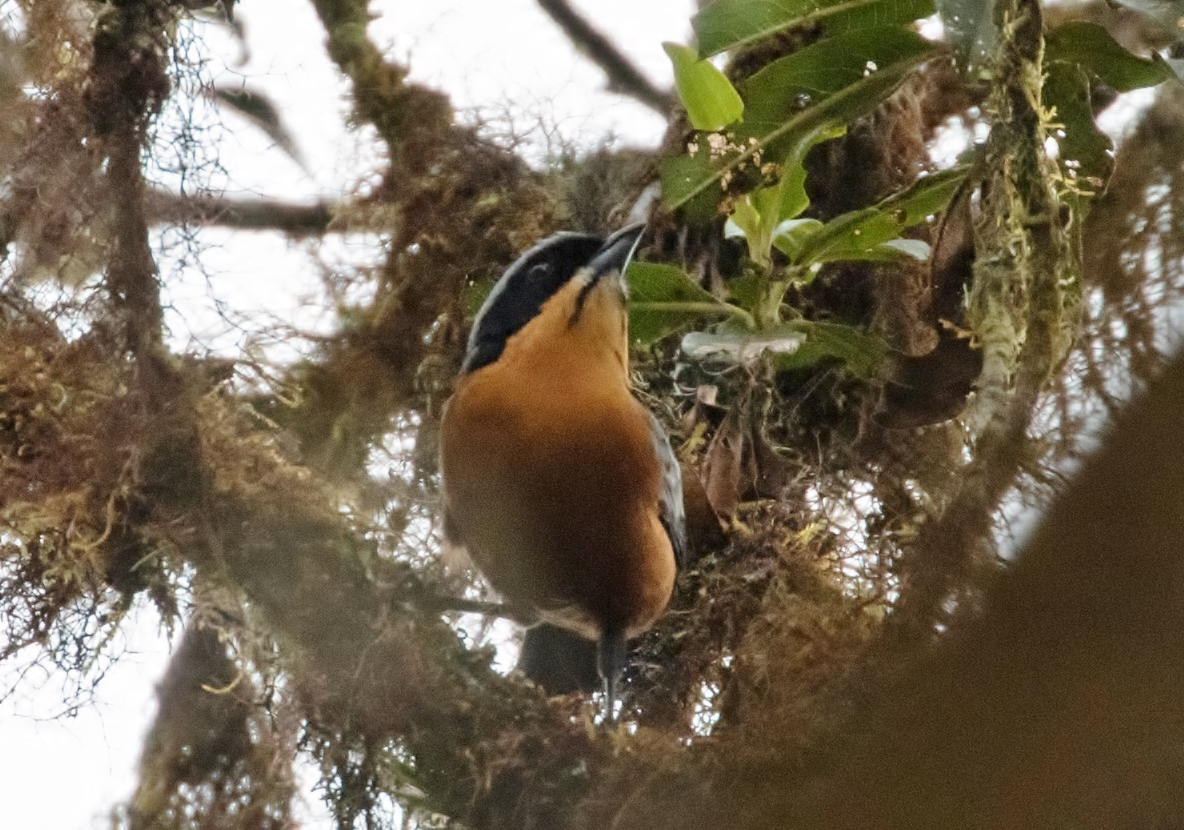

Conservation status
- Least Concern (IUCN 3.1)

Scientific classification
- Kingdom: Animalia
- Phylum: Chordata
- Class: Aves
- Order: Passeriformes
- Family: Thraupidae
- Genus: Dubusia
- Species: D. castaneoventris

Binomial name
- Dubusia castaneoventris (P.L. Sclater, 1851)

Synonyms
- Delothraupis castaneoventris

= Chestnut-bellied mountain tanager =

Species of bird

The chestnut-bellied mountain tanager (Dubusia castaneoventris) is a species of bird in the family Thraupidae.

It is found in Bolivia and Peru. Its natural habitat is subtropical or tropical moist montane forests.
