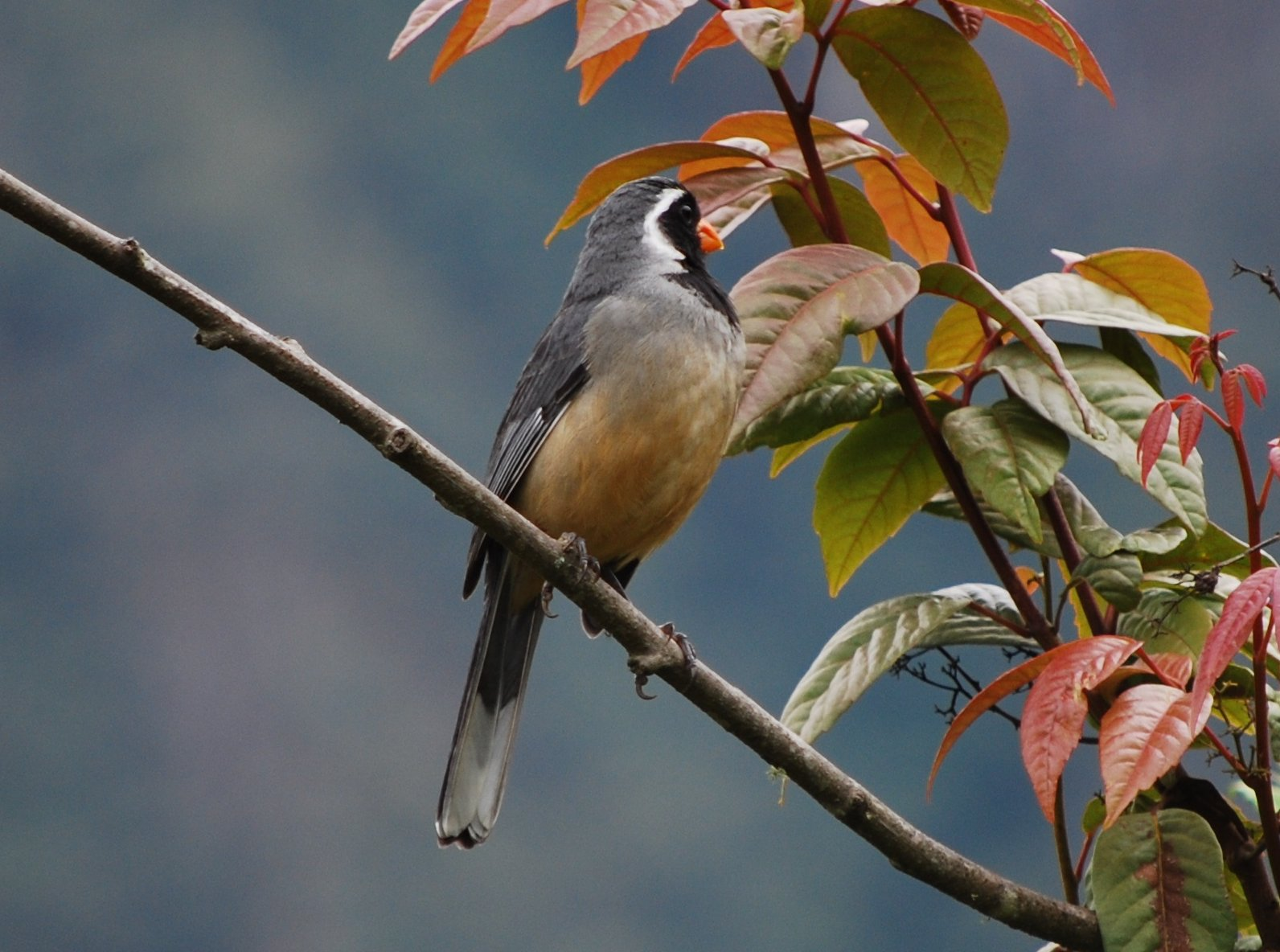
- In Peru

Conservation status
- Least Concern (IUCN 3.1)

Scientific classification
- Kingdom: Animalia
- Phylum: Chordata
- Class: Aves
- Order: Passeriformes
- Family: Thraupidae
- Genus: Saltator
- Species: S. aurantiirostris

Binomial name
- Saltator aurantiirostris Vieillot, 1817

= Golden-billed saltator =

Species of bird

The golden-billed saltator (Saltator aurantiirostris) is a species of bird in the family Thraupidae, the tanagers and allies. It is found in Argentina, Bolivia, Brazil, Chile, Paraguay, Peru, and Uruguay.

== Taxonomy and systematics ==
The golden-billed saltator was formally described in 1817 with its current binomial Saltator aurantiirostris. Some twentieth century authors treated it and the black-cowled saltator (S. nigriceps) as conspecific.

The golden-billed saltator has these six subspecies:

- S. a. iteratus Chapman, 1927
- S. a. albociliaris (Philippi & Landbeck, 1861)
- S. a. hellmayri Bond, J & Meyer de Schauensee, 1939
- S. a. aurantiirostris Vieillot, 1817
- S. a. parkesi Cardoso da Silva, 1990
- S. a. nasica Wetmore & Peters, JL, 1922

== Description ==
The golden-billed saltator is 19 to 20.5 cm (7.5 to 8.1 in) long and weighs 33 to 55 g (1.2 to 1.9 oz). The species is sexually dimorphic. Adults of the nominate subspecies S. a. aurantiirostris have a blackish forehead, a gray crown and nape, black lores, face, and ear coverts, and a white supercilium that extends around the rear of the ear coverts. Their upperparts and wings are gray and their tail is gray with thin white edges on the outermost pair. Their throat is white with a thin black band under it that connects with the black of the face. Their breast is gray that becomes buffy on the belly and a warmer buff on the vent area. Adult females have a dusky wash on the bill. They are a dull brownish black on the head where males are pure black. Their supercilium and chin are whitish yellow-buff and they have minimal to no black under the throat. Juveniles resemble females with more of a male-like head pattern, no chest band, and a dusky bill with a yellowish tip.

The other subspecies of the golden-billed saltator differ from the nominate and each other thus:

- S. a. iteratus: smaller bill than nominate with a buffy white throat, a thicker black chest band, and thin white tips on the outer two pairs of tail feathers
- S. a. albociliaris: like iteratus but with very narrow white chin and throat patch
- S. a. hellmayri: darker gray upperparts than nominate with faint olive cast; female has darker ear coverts, paler and grayer belly, and white tips on the outermost tail feathers
- S. a. parkesi: warm buff supercilium
- S. a. nasica: larger bill than nominate and no white on tail

Adults of both sexes of all subspecies have a medium to dark brown iris, a thick orange bill, and dark brown or leaden gray legs and feet.

== Distribution and habitat ==
The subspecies of the golden-billed saltator are found thus:

- S. a. iteratus: western slope of the Andes in northern Peru's Cajamarca, Amazonas, La Libertad, and Ancash departments
- S. a. albociliaris: Andes from Ancash and Huánuco departments in Peru south into extreme northern Chile's Arica y Parinacota Region
- S. a. hellmayri: Bolivia from La Paz and Cochabamba departments south to southeastern Potosí and northern Tarija departments
- S. a. aurantiirostris: southern Tarija in Bolivia, northern Argentina south to Buenos Aires Province, eastern Paraguay, and western Mato Grosso do Sul in Brazil
- S. a. parkesi: eastern Argentina's Entre Ríos Province, most of Uruguay, and southern Rio Grande do Sul in southernmost Brazil
- S. a. nasica: west-central Argentina from La Rioja Province south to western La Pampa Province

The golden-billed saltator inhabits a variety of dryish somewhat open landscapes including montane scrublands, Gran Chaco woodlands, the edges of forest, hedges around fields, and gardens. It is found down to near sea level in eastern Argentina, Uruguay, and far southern Brazil and mostly between 1,500 and 3,800 m (4,900 and 12,500 ft) in the Andes. It reaches 4,000 m (13,000 ft) in Peru.

== Behavior ==
=== Movement ===
The golden-billed saltator is believed to be a year-round resident.

=== Feeding ===
The golden-billed saltator's diet has been studied only in Argentina, where it fed primarily on seeds with smaller numbers of several types of insects. As far as is known, it usually forages in pairs.

=== Breeding ===
The golden-billed saltator's breeding season varies somewhat across its range. It spans November to January (rarely starting in October) in Argentina, spans October to January in Uruguay, and includes June in Peru and February to March in Bolivia. Most known nests were found in Argentina. They were cups made from straw, lichens, and other plant material and lined with rootlets and leaves. They were in bushes between about 1.2 and 3.7 m (4 and 12 ft) above the ground and were often partially hidden by vines. The clutch was two or three eggs that were blue-green with black markings. The incubation period was 14 days and fledging occurred 17 to 18 days after hatch.

=== Vocalization ===
The golden-billed saltator's song is "variable, a loud, strident, musical whistled phrase, for example: twi CHEW tew-SWEE?". Its calls are "a metallic tchip and a low gravelly churr.

== Status ==
The IUCN has assessed the golden-billed saltator as being of Least Concern. It has a large range; its population size and trend are not known. No immediate threats have been identified. It is considered "[q]uite common in suitable habitat over much of its range" and "fairly common" in Peru.
