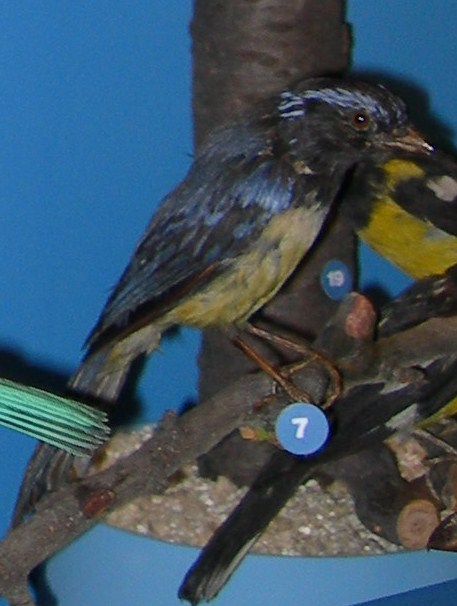
- Buff-breasted mountain tanager, (Dubusia taeniata)

Scientific classification
- Kingdom: Animalia
- Phylum: Chordata
- Class: Aves
- Order: Passeriformes
- Family: Thraupidae
- Genus: Dubusia; Bonaparte, 1850

Type species
- Tanagra selysia = Tanagra taeniata Bonaparte, 1850

= Dubusia =

Genus of birds

Dubusia is a small genus of mountain tanagers found in South America.

== Taxonomy and species list ==
The genus Dubusia was introduced in 1850 by the French naturalist Charles Lucien Bonaparte. The name was chosen to honor the Belgian politician and ornithologist Bernard du Bus de Gisignies. The type species was subsequently designated as the buff-breasted mountain tanager.

The genus contains the following four species:

Image	Common name	Scientific name	Distribution
	Buff-banded mountain tanager	Dubusia taeniata	Bolivia, Colombia, Ecuador, Peru, and Venezuela
	Carriker's mountain tanager	Dubusia carrikeri	northern Colombia
	Streak-crowned mountain tanager	Dubusia stictocephala	Peru
	Chestnut-bellied mountain tanager	Dubusia castaneoventris	Bolivia and Peru
