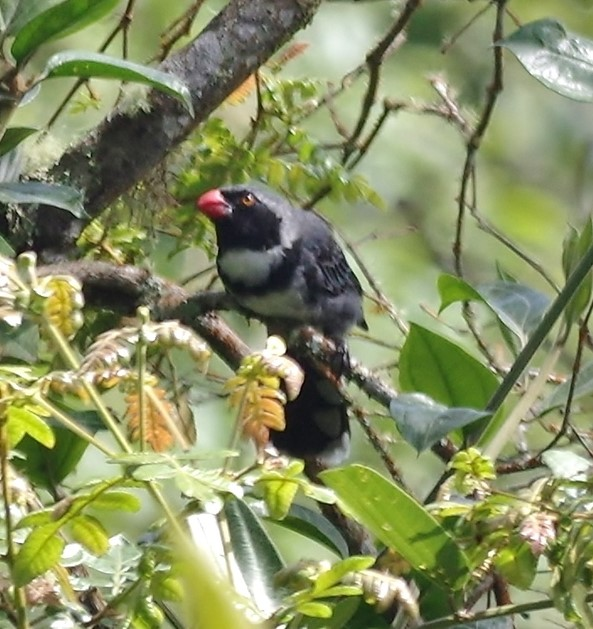
- In Manizales, Colombia

Conservation status
- Least Concern (IUCN 3.1)

Scientific classification
- Kingdom: Animalia
- Phylum: Chordata
- Class: Aves
- Order: Passeriformes
- Family: Thraupidae
- Genus: Saltator
- Species: S. cinctus

Binomial name
- Saltator cinctus Zimmer, JT, 1943

= Masked saltator =

Species of bird

The masked saltator (Saltator cinctus) is a species of passerine bird in the family Thraupidae, the tanagers and allies. It is found in Colombia, Ecuador, and Peru.

== Taxonomy and systematics ==
The masked saltator was formally described in 1800 with its current binomial Saltator cinctus.

The masked saltator is monotypic. However, the disjunct population in Colombia differs in its plumage and bill color and "may represent a separate taxon; further study required".

== Description ==
The Ecuadoran and Peruvian masked saltator is 21.5 cm (8.5 in) long and weighs 43 to 53 g (1.5 to 1.9 oz). The sexes have the same plumage. Adults have a slate-gray crown, nape, and upperparts. Their face and throat are black with a thin white line behind and that widens below the black. Their wing coverts and flight feathers are black with wide dark gray edges. Their tail is black with small white tips on the inner two pairs of feathers and wide white tips on the other four pairs. Their breast has a black band below the white one and the rest of their underparts are mostly white with gray flanks and wide black barring on the vent area. They have an orange or golden iris with a red inner ring, a mostly red maxilla, a mixed black and red mandible, and slate-gray legs and feet. Juveniles are duller than adults and have a smaller black mask and pale yellow bill. The Colombian population is 20 cm (7.9 in) long. It has a minimal pale streak behind the face, a creamy white rather than pure white belly, a red eye, and an entirely red bill.

== Distribution and habitat ==
One population of the masked saltator is found intermittently on both slopes of Colombia's Central Andes from southern Antioquia Department south to northern Valle del Cauca Department. The other population is found intermittently on the eastern Andean slope from north-central Ecuador's Napo Province south into Peru to Huánuco Department. In Colombia the population primarily inhabits Podocarpus forest at elevations between 2,000 and 3,000 m (6,600 and 9,800 ft). In Ecuador and Peru it inhabits humid montane forest in the subtropical and lower temperate zones. In Ecuador it ranges in elevation between 2,000 and 2,700 m (6,600 and 8,900 ft) and in Peru between 1,700 and 3,000 m (5,600 and 9,800 ft).

== Behavior ==
=== Movement ===
The masked saltator is generally a year-round resident though it seems to be somewhat nomadic, "possibly in response to variation in abundance of fruiting trees".

=== Feeding ===
The masked saltator's diet has not been studied but is known to include fruits and seeds. It forages mostly in the canopy. In both populations, single birds and pairs occasionally join mixed-species feeding flocks.

=== Breeding ===
The masked saltator's breeding season apparently includes April in Colombia but is otherwise unknown. The only known egg was laid in captivity; it was blue with dark brown blotches. Nothing else is known about the species' breeding biology.

=== Vocalization ===
As of August 2025 xeno-canto had recordings of masked saltator songs and calls only from Colombia and Ecuador. The Cornell Lab of Ornithology's Macaulay Library had songs and calls from those countries and one call recording from Peru. In Ecuador the species sings "a melodic chu-chu-chu-chuwit?. Its calls are "tzip or tseeyk, a soft tiu-tiu, chu and similar".

== Status ==
The IUCN originally in 1994 assessed the masked saltator as Near Threatened and since 2020 as being of Least Concern. Its estimated population of 30,000 mature individuals is believed to be decreasing. "Podocarpus forests and montane forests of the north Andes are generally under intense threat from conversion to agriculture and cattle pasture, mining and logging. The only known localities in Colombia are on the most deforested cordillera." It is considered uncommon in Colombia, "rare and apparently local" in Ecuador, and "rare and perhaps local" in Peru.
