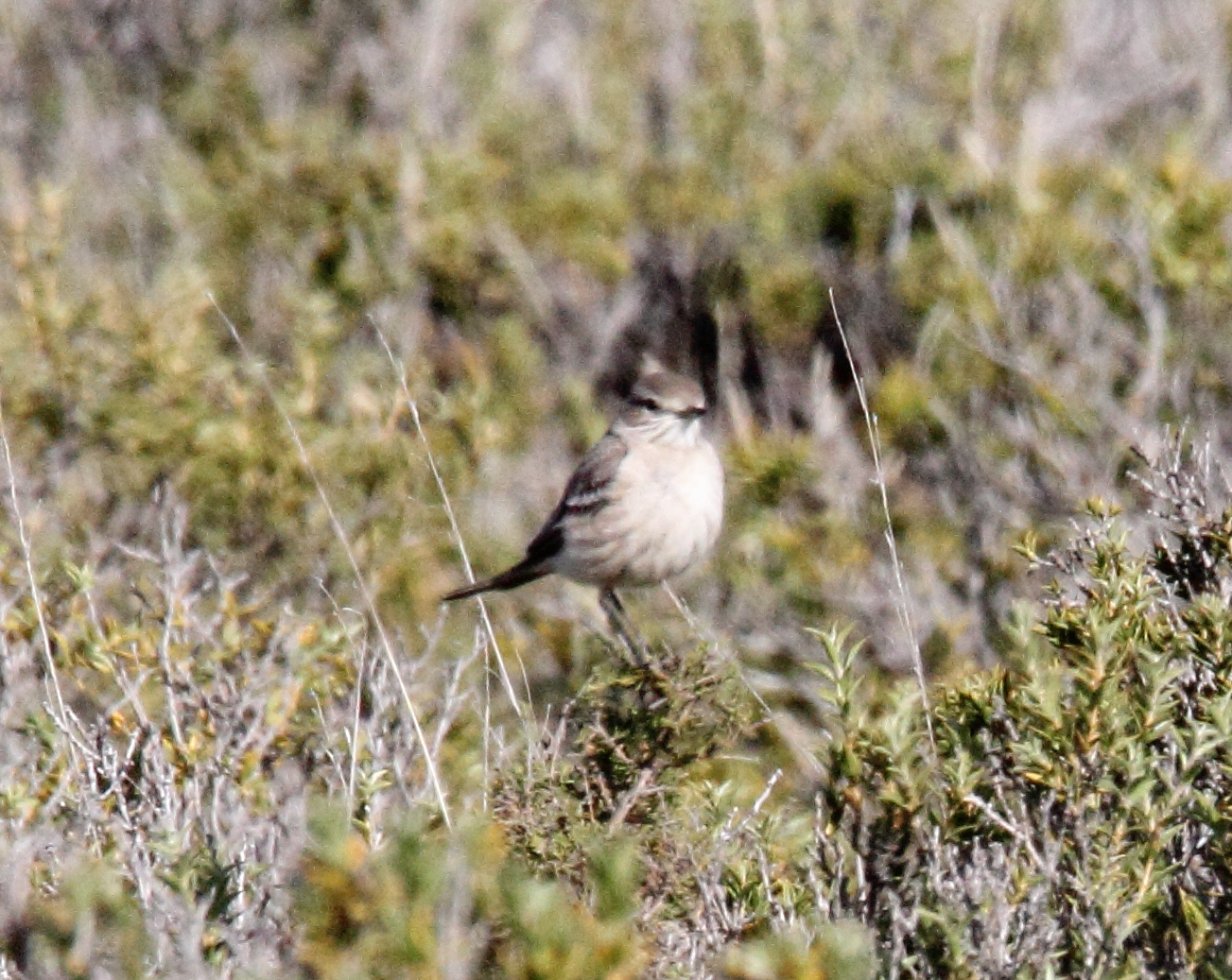

Conservation status
- Least Concern (IUCN 3.1)

Scientific classification
- Kingdom: Animalia
- Phylum: Chordata
- Class: Aves
- Order: Passeriformes
- Family: Tyrannidae
- Genus: Agriornis
- Species: A. murinus

Binomial name
- Agriornis murinus (D'Orbigny & Lafresnaye, 1837)
- Breeding Year-round Non-Breeding

= Lesser shrike-tyrant =

Species of bird

The lesser shrike-tyrant (Agriornis murinus) is a species of bird in the family Tyrannidae, the tyrant flycatchers. It is found in Argentina, Bolivia and Paraguay and as a vagrant to Brazil, Chile, and Uruguay.

== Taxonomy and systematics ==
The lesser shrike-tyrant was formally described in 1837 as Pepoazae murina. For much of the twentieth century it was placed in genus Xolmis but by the 1980s most authors had transferred to genus Agriornis that was erected in 1839.

The lesser shrike-tyrant is monotypic.

== Description ==
The lesser shrike-tyrant is 16 to 18.5 cm (6.3 to 7.3 in) long. Adult males have a gray-brown crown, mottled blackish and white lores, and a whitish or buffy supercilium and eye-ring. Their upperparts are gray-brown. Their wings are mostly dusky with whitish tips on the coverts and whitish edges on the inner flight feathers. Their tail is mostly dusky with pale grayish to white outer webs on the outermost pair pair of feathers. Their throat is white with thin black streaks, their breast very pale grayish brown, their flanks pale grayish brown with a buff tinge, and their belly creamy whitish. Adult females have almost the same plumage but the streaks on their throat are browner than the male's. Both sexes have a dark iris, a slender hooked black bill, and blackish legs and feet.

== Distribution and habitat ==
The lesser shrike-tyrant is found from central Bolivia south through western Paraguay and Argentina to northern Santa Cruz Province. It has also been recorded as a vagrant in Brazil, Chile, and Uruguay. It inhabits open areas with scrubby bushes and scattered trees and in the north also agricultural areas. In elevation it ranges from sea level to 2,500 m (8,200 ft); it reaches that high point in Bolivia.

== Behavior ==
=== Movement ===
The lesser shrike-tyrant is migratory, but sources differ on the extent of its breeding and wintering ranges. BirdLife International (BLI) states that it is a complete migrant. However, its range map places it as a year-round resident in a smallish area of north-central Argentina. The map shows it as a breeding species in Argentina south of a line from southern Mendoza Province to southern Buenos Aires Province and as a non-breeding species north of that line in Argentina and through far western Uruguay and western Paraguay to central Bolivia. Their text generally concurs with the map, including its year-round residence in Argentina, but does not specify the species' seasonality in Paraguay. The Cornell Lab of Ornithology's Birds of the World agrees with the BLI breeding range and most of its non-breeding range. However, it does not include BLI's year-round residence zone nor its non-breeding presence in Uruguay. It notes that the species has been recorded as a vagrant in far southern Brazil. It further notes "Survey work [is] required in order to establish precise limits of breeding range." The map in Peña's Birds of Southern South America and Antarctica agrees with the Cornell breeding and non-breeding ranges and like Cornell does not include a year-round range. The South American Classification Committee of the American Ornithological Society does not separately note breeding-only versus both breeding and non-breeding presence in a country; it places the lesser shrike-tyrant as, at a minimum, breeding in Argentina. It places the species as a non-breeder in Bolivia and Paraguay and as a vagrant in Brazil, Chile, and Uruguay.

=== Feeding ===
The lesser shrike-tyrant has an eclectic diet that includes insects; other arthropods; small mammals, reptiles, and amphibians; and bird eggs and nestlings. It usually forages by itself. It perches on a bush and takes most prey by dropping to it on the ground; it sometimes takes it in mid-air by "hawking".

=== Breeding ===
The lesser shrike-tyrant's one known nest was a cup made from stems lined with grass and feathers. It was in a bush about 40 cm (16 in) above the ground and held three eggs. Males make an aerial courtship display during which their flight feathers make a faint low-pitched whirr. Nothing else is known about the species' breeding biology.

=== Vocalization ===
As of May 2025 xeno-canto had a single recording of a lesser shrike-tyrant call; the Cornell Lab's Macaulay Library had it and 11 others. The species is usually silent but makes "an occasional phooeeay descending" call.

== Status ==
The IUCN has assessed the lesser shrike-tyrant as being of Least Concern. It has a very large range; its population size is not known and is believed to be stable. No immediate threats have been identified. It is considered uncommon to fairly common.
