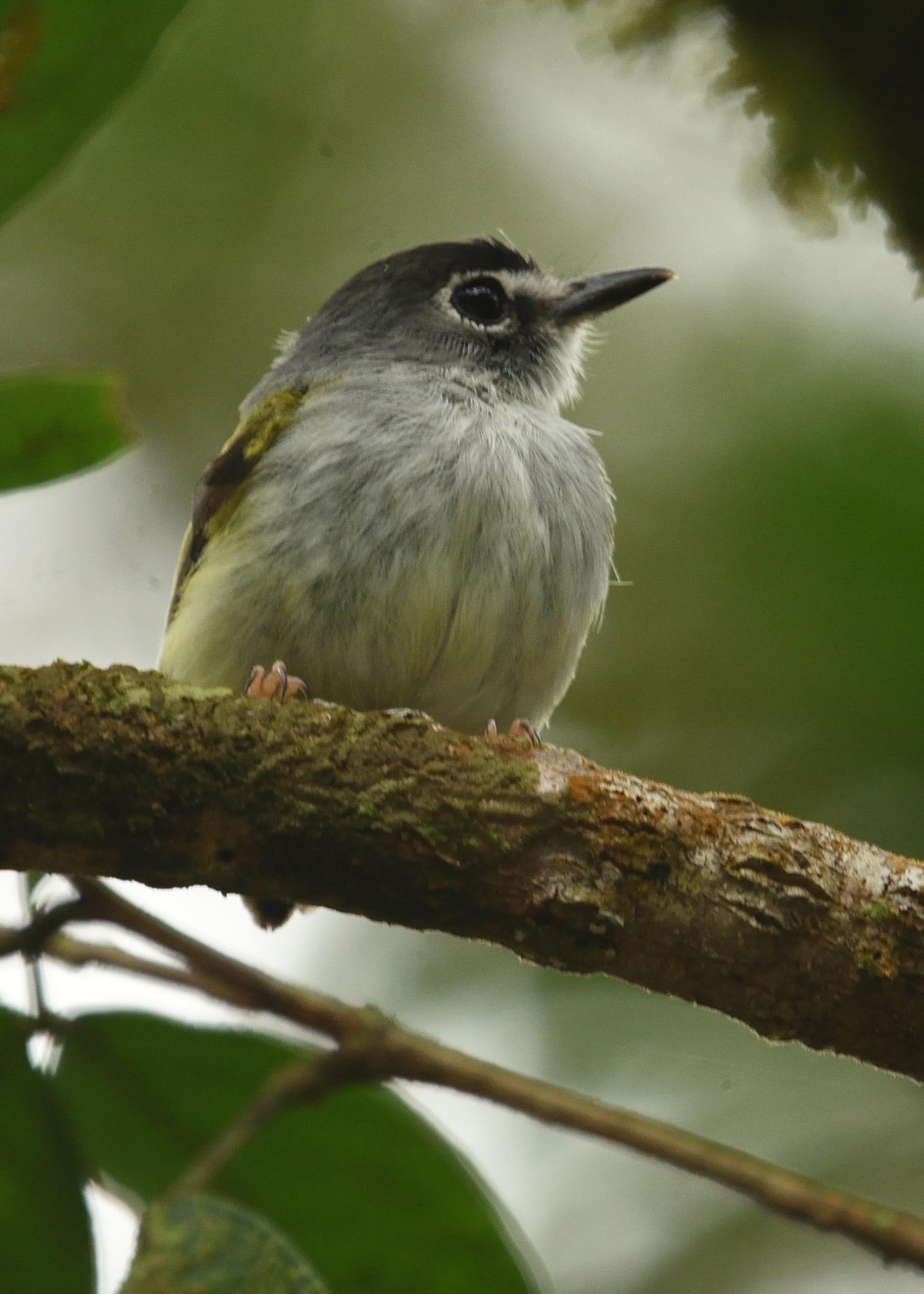

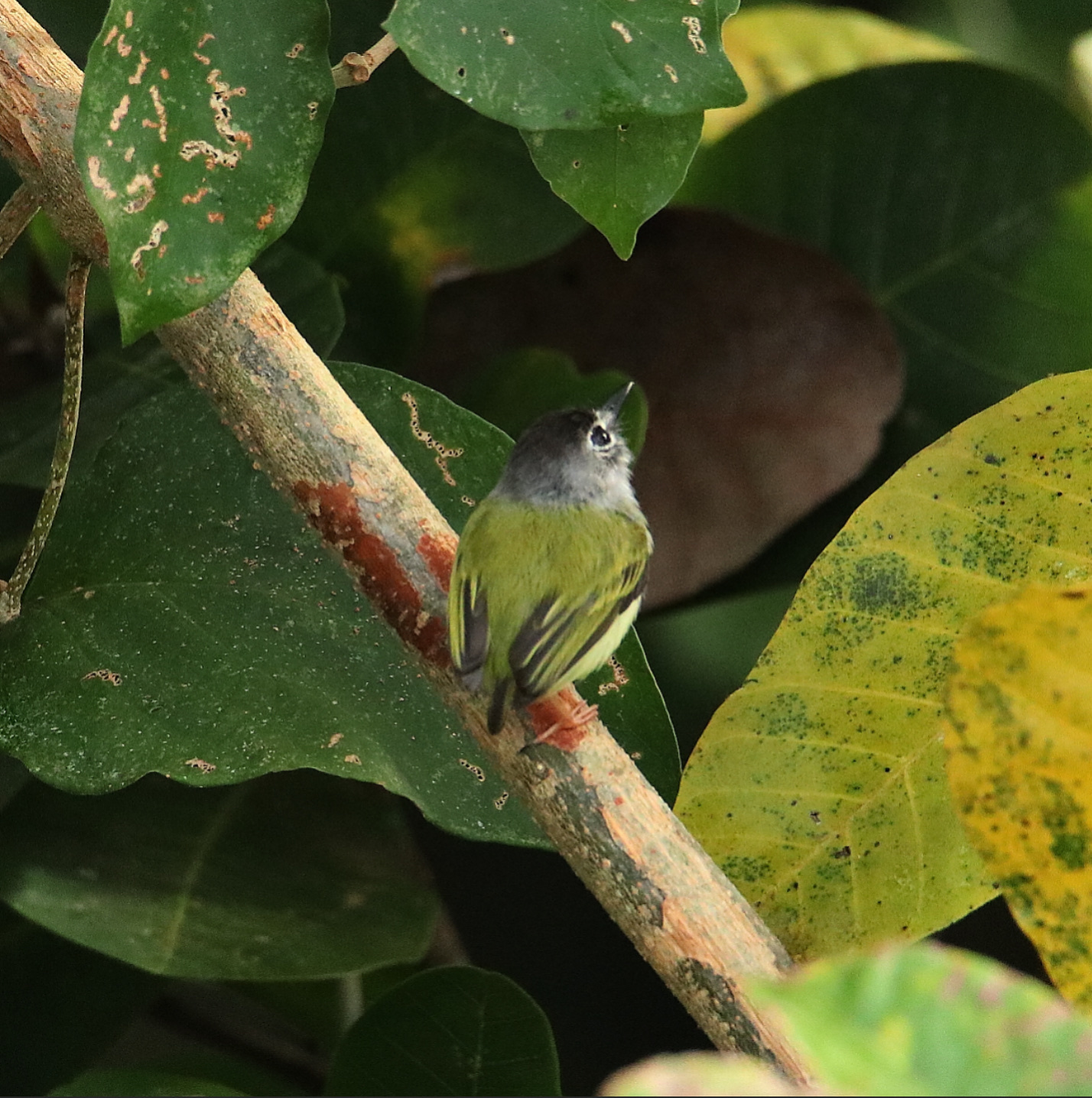

Conservation status
- Least Concern (IUCN 3.1)

Scientific classification
- Kingdom: Animalia
- Phylum: Chordata
- Class: Aves
- Order: Passeriformes
- Family: Tyrannidae
- Genus: Myiornis
- Species: M. atricapillus

Binomial name
- Myiornis atricapillus (Lawrence, 1875)

= Black-capped pygmy tyrant =

Species of bird

The black-capped pygmy tyrant (Myiornis atricapillus) is a species of bird in the family Tyrannidae, the tyrant flycatchers. It is found in Colombia, Costa Rica, Ecuador, and Panama.

== Taxonomy and systematics ==
The black-capped pygmy tyrant was originally described in 1875 as Orchilus atricapillus. At various times since it was described it has been placed in genus Perissotriccus and treated as a subspecies of the short-tailed pygmy tyrant (Myiornis ecaudatus). The black-capped and short-tailed pygmy tyrants apparently form a superspecies. Several authors have suggested that genus Myiornis should be merged into genus Hemitriccus.

The black-capped pygmy tyrant is monotypic.

== Description ==
The black-capped pygmy tyrant is 6 to 8 cm (2.4 to 3.1 in) long; three individuals weighed 5.5 to 6 g (0.19 to 0.21 oz). It is the smallest passerine in Central America and among the smallest on Earth. Adult males have a black crown that fades to slate gray at its rear and on the nape. They have white lores that continue to a white eye-ring and a black spot by the eye on an otherwise slate gray face. Their back, rump, and uppertail coverts are bright olive green. Their greater and median wing coverts are slate black with olive green tips and their lesser wing coverts are bright olive green. Their tail is very short. Their flight feathers (remiges and rectrices) are slate black with olive green to yellowish edges. Their throat is white, their breast white with pale gray sides, and their belly, flanks, and undertail coverts pale yellow. They have a brown to dark brown iris, a black bill with a small white tip on the mandible, and pale brown or pink to orangish legs and feet. Adult females are similar to males but their crown is mostly dusky slate with dull black only at its front end. Juveniles of both sexes resemble adult females.

== Distribution and habitat ==
Most sources place the black-capped pygmy tyrant along the Caribbean slope of Costa Rica and Panama as far as Darién Province, on both slopes in Darién, into central Colombia as far as Santander Department, and along the Pacific slope of Colombia into northwestern Ecuador as far as northern Manabí and Santo Domingo de los Tsáchilas provinces. The Cornell Lab of Ornithology's Birds of the World adds two early twenty-first century records in southeastern Nicaragua.

The black-capped pygmy tyrant primarily inhabits the interior of humid lowland and foothill forest in the tropical zone. It also occurs in mature secondary forest, semi-open forest, and in edges and gaps in the forest. There are a few reports of it in scrubby fields and cacao plantations. In elevation it ranges from sea level to 600 m (2,000 ft) in Costa Rica, 750 m (2,500 ft) in Panama, 1,300 m (4,300 ft) in Colombia, and 800 m (2,600 ft) in Costa Rica.

== Behavior ==
=== Movement ===
The black-capped pygmy tyrant is a year-round resident.

=== Feeding ===
The black-capped pygmy tyrant feeds on insects, though details are lacking. It typically forages singly, in pairs, or in small family groups and very rarely joins mixed-species feeding flocks. It mostly forages from the middle levels up to the canopy. It takes prey mostly by using short upward sallies from a perch to grab it from leaves, and also gleans it while briefly hovering after a short flight.

=== Breeding ===
The black-capped pygmy tyrant breeds between March and May in Costa Rica. Its breeding season includes March and April in Panama and February to May in Colombia. The species' nest is a bag or pouch with a round side entrance; one was 150 mm (5.9 in) long. One was made from mosses and liverworts and lined with fine plant fibers. The nest is typically suspended from a twig; they have been found between 1.3 and 7.3 m (4 and 24 ft) above the ground. The clutch is two eggs that are white with cinnamon or pale brown markings. Both sexes provision nestlings. The incubation period, time to fledging, and other details of parental care are not known.

=== Vocalization ===
The black-capped pygmy tyrant's vocalizations are high pitched and similar to calls made by insects and frogs. What is thought to be its song is a "'crreek' or 'tstrreep' " that is often given singly but also in a series. Other vocalizations include "a sharp, reedy tseep or keep which rises in inflection" and a "tsrit" that sounds like a warbler or cricket.

== Status ==
The IUCN has assessed the black-capped pygmy tyrant as being of Least Concern. It has a very large range; its estimated population of at least 500,000 mature individuals is believed to be decreasing. No immediate threats have been identified. It is considered fairly common in Costa Rica, common in Colombia, and "locally quite common" in Ecuador. "Black-capped Pygmy-Tyrant occupies humid lowland forest, and so as is true of all species that are restricted to forest, it is vulnerable to habitat degradation or loss."
