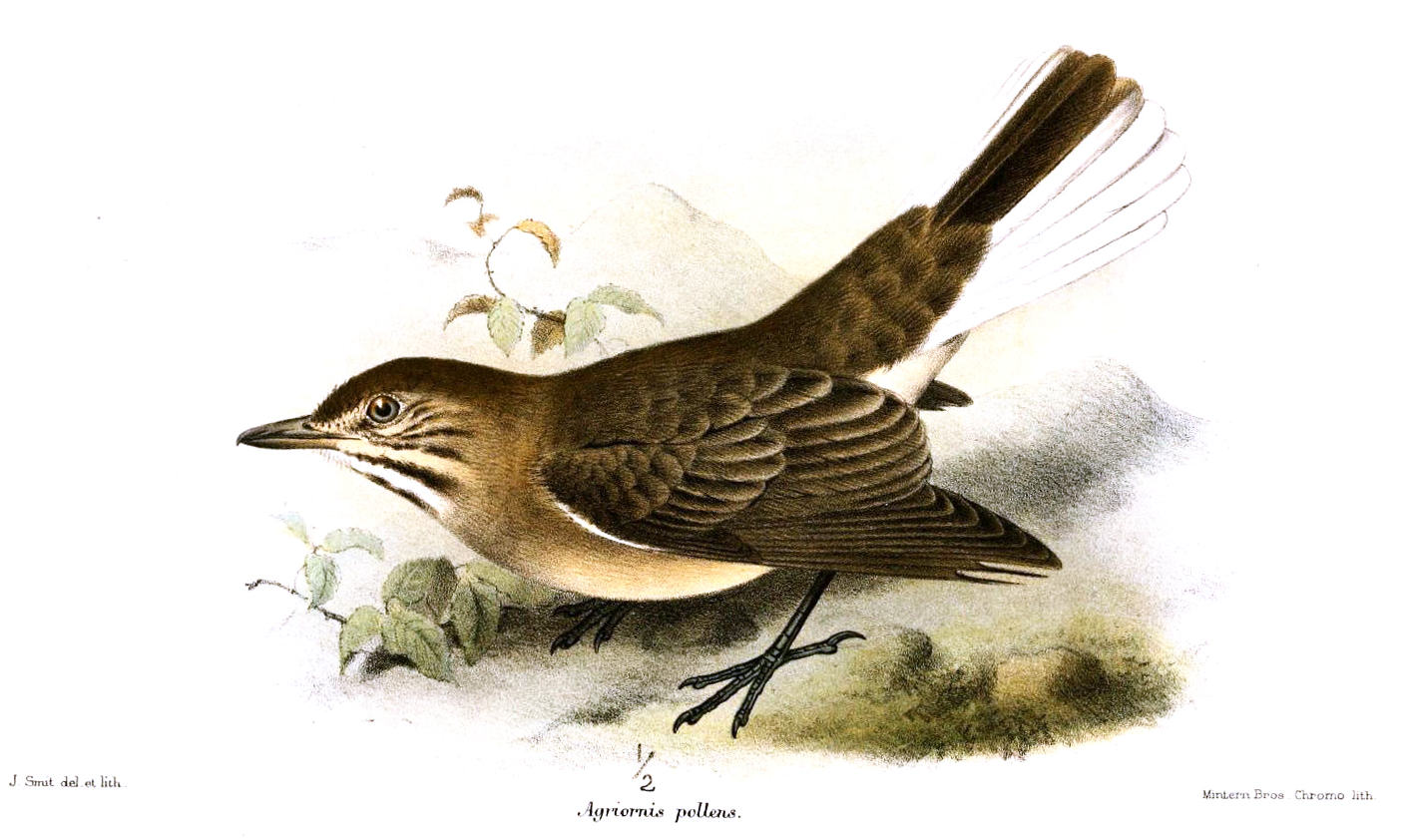

Conservation status
- Vulnerable (IUCN 3.1)

Scientific classification
- Kingdom: Animalia
- Phylum: Chordata
- Class: Aves
- Order: Passeriformes
- Family: Tyrannidae
- Genus: Agriornis
- Species: A. albicauda

Binomial name
- Agriornis albicauda (Philippi & Landbeck, 1863)

Synonyms
- See text

Audio

= White-tailed shrike-tyrant =

Species of bird

The white-tailed shrike-tyrant (Agriornis albicauda) is a species of bird in the family Tyrannidae. It is found in Argentina, Bolivia, Chile, Ecuador, and Peru.

== Taxonomy and systematics ==
The white-tailed shrike-tyrant has a complicated taxonomic history. It was formally described in 1863 as Dasycephala albicauda. What later became its subspecies A. a. pollens had been described in 1860 as Agriornis andicoloa. Soon thereafter andicoloa was discovered to have been used for a subspecies of the grey-bellied shrike tyrant (A. micropterus) so by the principle of priority the new species was renamed A. pollens. That taxon and Dasycephala albicauda were combined in the early twentieth century and again by the principle of priority the species became the present Agriornis albicauda.

The white-tailed shrike-tyrant has two subspecies, the nominate A. a. albicauda (Philippi & Landbeck, 1863) and A. a. pollens (Sclater, PL, 1869).

== Description ==
The white-tailed shrike-tyrant is 25 to 28 cm (9.8 to 11 in) long. The sexes have the same plumage. The two subspecies are practically indistinguishable though A. a. pollens may be slightly larger than the nominate. Adults have a dark gray-brown crown, a narrow buff supercilium, and a streaked face. Their upperparts are dark gray-brown. Their wings are mostly dark gray-brown with paler edges on the flight feathers. Their underwing coverts are cinnamon-buff. Their central tail feathers are dark gray-brown and the rest are white with small dark marks at their tips. Their throat is white with blackish streaks, their upper breast and sides gray-brown, and their lower breast, belly, and vent whitish with a buff tinge. Both sexes have a brown to dark brown iris, a thick hooked bill with a black maxilla and a yellowish mandible, and black legs and feet.

== Distribution and habitat ==
The white-tailed shrike-tyrant has a disjunct distribution. Subspecies A. a. pollens is the more northerly of the two. It is found intermittently in the Andes of Ecuador. The nominate subspecies is found in the Andes of Peru from Piura Department to Pasco Department and then from southern Cuzco Department south through western Bolivia into the eastern parts of northern Chile's Tarapacá and Antofagasta regions. A separate population of it is in northwestern Argentina's Tucumán Province and perhaps a bit beyond.

The white-tailed shrike-tyrant inhabits a variety of high elevation open landscapes. These include temperate zone shrubby grasslands, páramo, puna grassland, and montane scrublands. It favors areas with shrubs, rocks and boulder, or rocky slopes and cliffs. It also occurs around isolated and abandoned human structures, in Polylepis woodlands, and in Ecuador in farmland with introduced Eucalyptus trees. In elevation it ranges between 2,400 and 3,100 m (7,900 and 10,200 ft) in Ecuador and between 2,400 and 4,300 m (7,900 and 14,100 ft) in Peru. It ranges between 4,200 and 4,600 m (13,800 and 15,100 ft) in Chile; it is known only above 3,100 m (10,200 ft) in Argentina and its elevational range in Bolivia is unknown.

== Behavior ==
=== Movement ===
The white-tailed shrike-tyrant is generally considered a year-round resident. However, "it is not found in the same places every year [and] further information is needed".

=== Feeding ===
The white-tailed shrike-tyrant's diet has not been fully defined but it is known to feed on insects, small mammals, and small lizards. Other members of genus Agriornis feed on those items and other arthropods, small amphibians, and bird eggs and nestlings as well. It typically forages singly or in pairs and captures prey by dropping on it from a perch and in mid-air by "hawking".

=== Breeding ===
The white-tailed shrike-tyrant is believed to breed in the austral spring and summer, spanning at least October to January. Males make an aerial courtship flight in which they make an undulating circle. Two nests have been described; they were made of grass and moss on a base of twigs and lined with softer material like mammal hair, grass, and feathers. One was on the ground and the other in a pine tree. The clutch size appears to be one or two. The incubation period and time to fledging are not known. Both parents provision nestlings but other details of parental care are not known.

=== Vocalization ===
The white-tailed shrike-tyrant's voice in Ecuador is described as "a loud and surprisingly melodic teeu, tcheeu-tcheeu-tcheeuw with many variations". In Peru it is described as "a haphazard series of loud tew and pew! notes".

== Conservation status ==
The IUCN originally in 1988 assessed the white-tailed shrike-tyrant as Threatened but since 1994 as Vulnerable. Though it has a large range it is generally rare and local. Its estimated population of between 5250 and 23,000 mature individuals is believed to be decreasing. "The reasons for the species's scarcity and decline are not fully understood. A potential driver of the decline could be a high sensitivity to habitat degradation, as bushy vegetation is cleared for grazing [and] may furthermore suffer from hunting and direct persecution." It is "now very rare and local" in Ecuador and "rare [and] formerly more common and widespread" in Peru. The species is found in a few national parks in Ecuador, Peru, and Chile.
