= James Jobling =

James Jobling may refer to:

- James Wesley Jobling, American physician
- James A. Jobling, British naturalist and author
