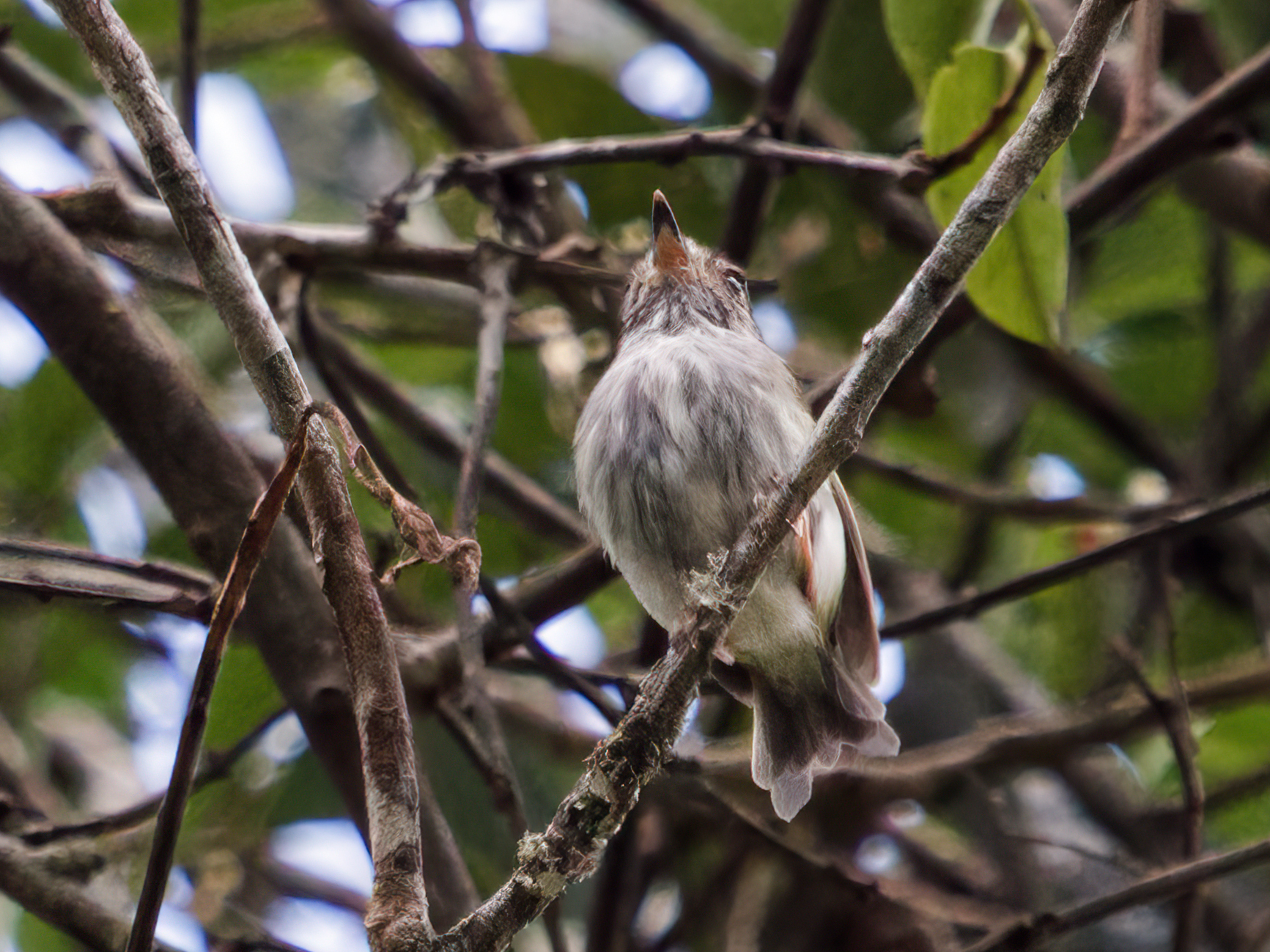

Conservation status
- Least Concern (IUCN 3.1)

Scientific classification
- Kingdom: Animalia
- Phylum: Chordata
- Class: Aves
- Order: Passeriformes
- Family: Tyrannidae
- Genus: Myiornis
- Species: M. albiventris

Binomial name
- Myiornis albiventris (Berlepsch & Stolzmann, 1894)

= White-bellied pygmy tyrant =

Species of bird

The white-bellied pygmy tyrant or white-breasted pygmy-tyrant (Myiornis albiventris) is a species of bird in the family Tyrannidae, the tyrant flycatchers. It is found in Bolivia, Ecuador, and Peru.

== Taxonomy and systematics ==
The white-bellied pygmy tyrant is monotypic. However, one author has treated it as a subspecies of the eared pygmy tyrant (M. auricularis); major taxonomic systems retain it as a full species.

The white-bellied pygmy tyrant was originally described in 1894 as Orchilus albiventris.

== Description ==
The white-bellied pygmy tyrant is about 7 cm (2.8 in) long and weighs about 5 to 6 g (0.18 to 0.21 oz). It is a very small, large-headed bird. The sexes have the same plumage. Adults have a buff whitish area surrounding the eye with a grayish crescent behind the ear coverts. Their crown is bright olive with a brown tinge and their back and rump are bright olive. Their wings are dusky with bright olive-yellow edges on the flight feathers and tips of the coverts; the latter show as two indistinct wing bars. Their tail is dusky. Their throat and upper breast are whitish with faint gray streaks and the rest of their underparts are white with a tinge of yellowish olive on the sides and crissum. They have a reddish iris, a blackish bill, and pinkish legs and feet.

== Distribution and habitat ==
The white-bellied pygmy tyrant is found intermittently along the eastern slope of the Andes from extreme southeastern Zamora-Chinchipe Province in southern Ecuador south through Peru and central Bolivia as far as western Santa Cruz Department. Especially in Peru it extends from the slope eastward along outlying ridges. It inhabits humid montane forest, where it favors edges and gaps such as those caused by fallen trees. It also is partial to vine tangles. In elevation it ranges from 350 to 1,200 m (1,100 to 3,900 ft) overall but only up to 1,100 m (3,600 ft) in Peru.

== Behavior ==
=== Movement ===
The white-bellied pygmy tyrant is a year-round resident.

=== Feeding ===
The white-bellied pygmy tyrant feeds on insects. It mostly forages in the vegetation's lower and middle levels, taking prey using short upward sallies from a perch to grab it from leaves.

=== Breeding ===
Nothing is known about the white-bellied pygmy tyrant's breeding biology.

=== Vocalization ===
The white-bellied pygmy tyrant is "[e]asily overlooked except by voice". Its song is "a mellow, tinkling, rising-falling trill: triiiiieww, sometimes becoming longer, with [the] last few notes stuttered trriiiEEEEiii'rr'rrl". Its calls are "a quiet trrt or trrrrl and a more slowly trilled tree ee'ee'ew".

== Status ==
The IUCN originally in 1988 assessed the white-bellied pygmy tyrant as Near Threatened but since 2004 as being of Least Concern. It has a large range; its population size is not known and is believed to be decreasing. No immediate threats have been identified. It is considered generally uncommon though "fairly common but local" in Peru. It is found in several protected areas.
