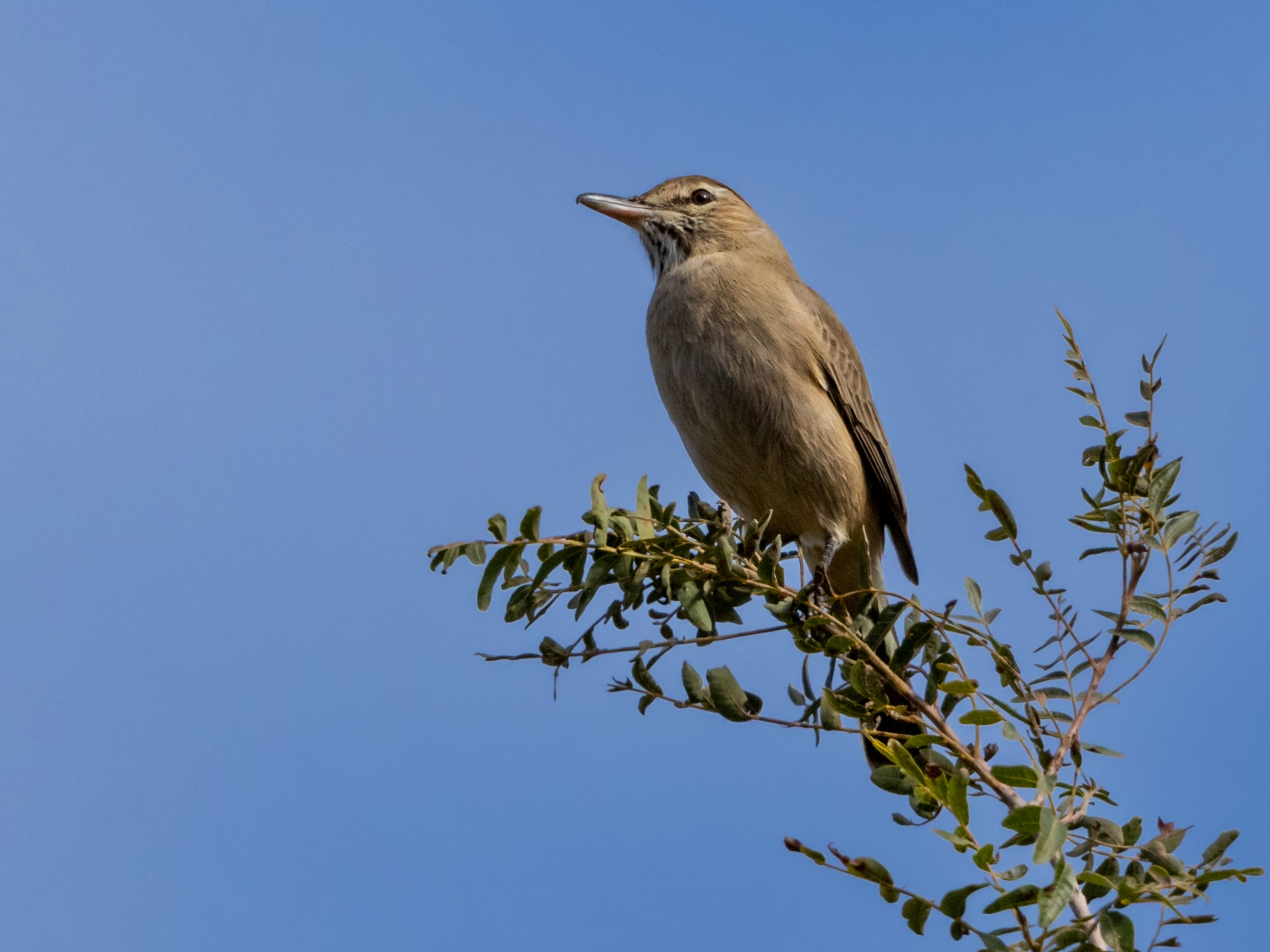

Conservation status
- Least Concern (IUCN 3.1)

Scientific classification
- Kingdom: Animalia
- Phylum: Chordata
- Class: Aves
- Order: Passeriformes
- Family: Tyrannidae
- Genus: Agriornis
- Species: A. micropterus

Binomial name
- Agriornis micropterus Gould, 1839
- Blue represents the non-breeding range. Normally purple is used to show year-round residence. This color is correct in the northwest. However, sources agree that the species breeds but does not winter in southern Argentina; usually orange is used for that designation. See the Distribution and Movement sections for details.

= Grey-bellied shrike-tyrant =

Species of bird

The grey-bellied shrike-tyrant (Agriornis micropterus) is a species of bird in the family Tyrannidae, the tyrant flycatchers. It is found in Argentina, Bolivia, Chile, Paraguay, and Peru, as a migrant or vagrant to Uruguay, and as a vagrant to Brazil.

== Taxonomy and systematics ==
The grey-bellied shrike-tyrant has two subspecies, the nominate A. m. micropterus (Gould, 1839) and A. m. andecola (d'Orbigny, 1840).

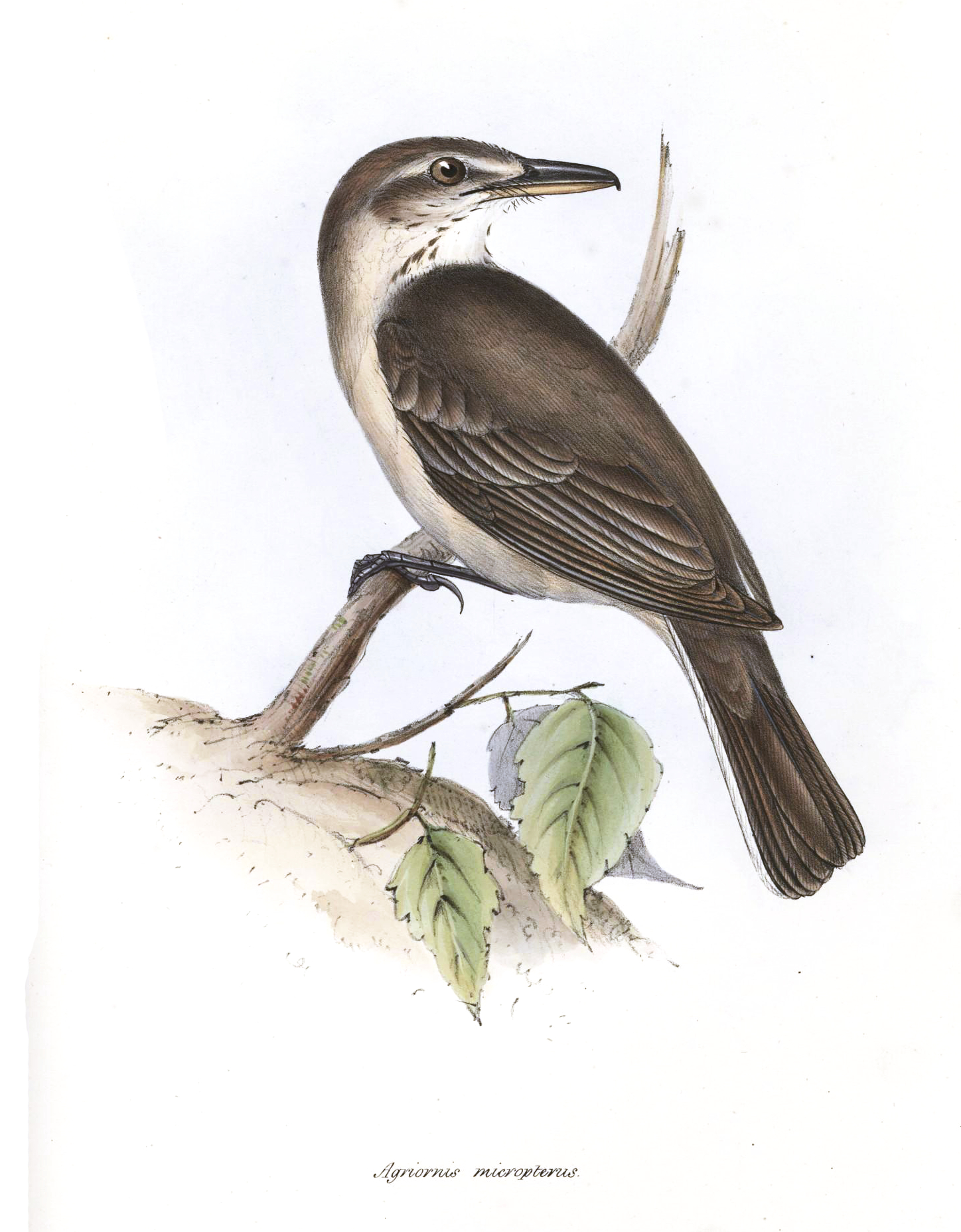
Illustration by John Gould, 1839

== Description ==
The grey-bellied shrike-tyrant is 23 to 24.5 cm (9.1 to 9.6 in) long. Adult males of the nominate subspecies have a gray-brown crown, a whitish supercilium, rufous-tinged ear coverts, and black and white streaked cheeks. Their upperparts are gray-brown. Their wings are mostly gray-brown with whitish edges on the secondaries and pale grayish coverts. Their tail is mostly black with narrow white edges on the outer webs of the outer feathers. Their throat is white with heavy black streaks, their breast is pale brown, their flanks are washed with buffy, and their belly is pale gray-brown to whitish. Adult females have dark brown streaks on their throat and are otherwise like males. Juveniles are browner above than adults, with pale cinnamon-brown underparts and few streaks on the throat. Subspecies A. m. andecola is larger and slightly darker than the nominate, with a tawny tinge to the vent area. Adults of both sexes of both subspecies have a dark iris, a straight hooked bill with a dark brown maxilla and an orange mandible, and dusky legs and feet.

== Distribution and habitat ==
Subspecies A. m. andecola of the grey-bellied shrike-tyrant is the more northerly of the two. It is found from Puno Department in southern Peru south through western Bolivia into the eastern part of northern Chile's Tarapacá Region and northwestern Argentina as far as Catamarca and Tucumán provinces. Sources differ on the range of the nominate subspecies. According to BirdLife International (BLI) and Cornell Lab of Ornithology's Birds of the World it is found from southern Bolivia south through western Paraguay and southern Uruguay into Argentina to central Santa Cruz Province. However, the map in Peña's Birds of Southern South America and Antarctica does not include Uruguay in the species' range, and the South American Classification Committee of the American Ornithological Society notes it only as a vagrant in that country. (Cornell does say that there are no recent records in Uruguay.) The SACC also has a record of the species as a vagrant in Brazil and Cornell notes that as well. The Clements taxonomy includes Uruguay but not Bolivia in the nominate's range.

The grey-bellied shrike-tyrant primarily inhabits steppe and puna grassland with shrubs and boulders. In the austral winter it also occurs in agricultural fields. In elevation it ranges overall from sea level to 5,000 m (16,000 ft); in Peru it is found between 3,800 and 4,100 m (12,500 and 13,500 ft).

== Behavior ==
=== Movement ===
Subspecies A. m. andecola of the grey-bellied shrike-tyrant is generally believed to be a year-round resident, though in Peru it might only be present in winter. The nominate subspecies is a complete migrant. All of the sources agree that it breeds in southern Argentina from Mendoza Province east to southern Buenos Aires Province and south to central Santa Cruz Province. However, the sources disagree on its winter range. The IUCN, which uses BLI range data, states that it is resident in Argentina, Bolivia, Paraguay, and Uruguay. BLI states that is a complete migrant but its BLI map, shown above, places it as a year-round resident in southern Argentina. The map places it as a winter migrant in northern Argentina and as only a winter migrant in the other three countries. (Note that A. m. andecola is a year-round resident in Bolivia.) Cornell notes it as breeding but not wintering in southern Argentina and agrees with the BLI map's wintering range. Clements places it as a breeder in southern Argentina, as a winter migrant in Paraguay and Uruguay, and does not extend its winter range into Bolivia. Peña and the SACC place it as a winter migrant in Paraguay and Bolivia but do not include Uruguay.

=== Feeding ===
The grey-bellied shrike-tyrant feeds on insects; small mammals, reptiles, and amphibians; bird eggs and nestlings; and occasionally on fruits. It perches on a rock or shrub and typically captures prey by dropping on it from the perch, by running on the ground, and in mid-air by "hawking".

=== Breeding ===
The grey-bellied shrike-tyrant's breeding season has not been fully defined. It includes January in Chile and at least from September to December in Argentina. Males make an aerial courtship display during which their outer primaries make a very faint whirr. The species' nest is a bulky cup made mostly from sticks and large twigs and placed in a bush. The clutch is three to four eggs. The incubation period, time to fledging, and details of parental care are not known.

=== Vocalization ===
The grey-bellied shrike-tyrant is mostly silent. Males chasing another give "high-pitched petulant calls". In the breeding season they make a "high-pitched whistle".

== Status ==
The IUCN has assessed the grey-bellied shrike-tyrant as being of Least Concern. It has a very large range; its population size is not known and is believed to be stable. No immediate threats have been identified. It is considered generally uncommon but locally fairly common.
