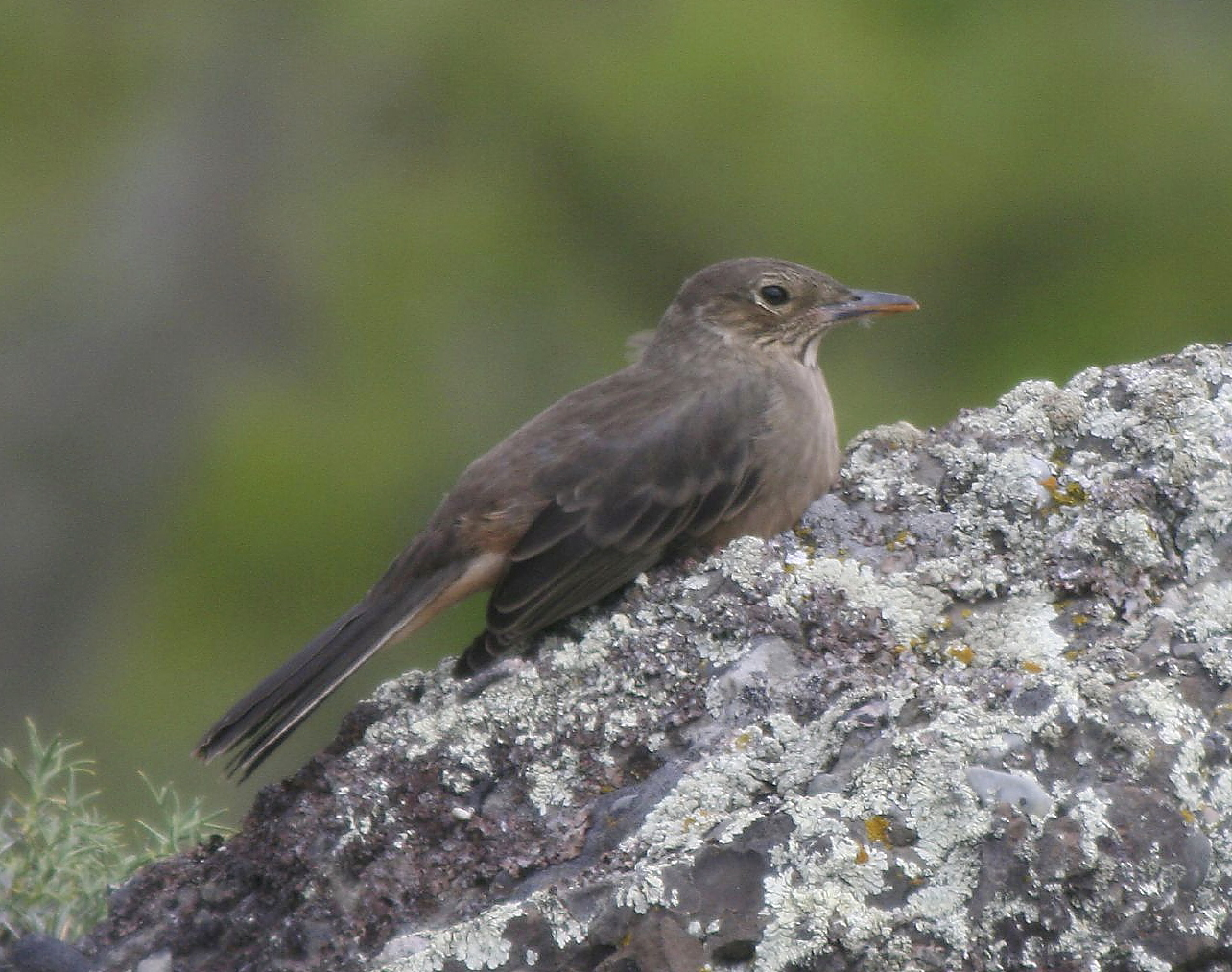

Conservation status
- Least Concern (IUCN 3.1)

Scientific classification
- Kingdom: Animalia
- Phylum: Chordata
- Class: Aves
- Order: Passeriformes
- Family: Tyrannidae
- Genus: Agriornis
- Species: A. lividus

Binomial name
- Agriornis lividus (Kittlitz, 1835)

= Great shrike-tyrant =

Species of bird

The great shrike-tyrant (Agriornis lividus) is a species of bird in the family Tyrannidae, the tyrant flycatchers. It is found in Argentina and Chile.

== Taxonomy and systematics ==
The great shrike-tyrant was formally described in 1835 as Tamnophilus [sic] lividus.

The great shrike-tyrant has two subspecies, the nominate A. l. lividus (Kittlitz, 1835) and A. l. fortis (Berlepsch, 1907).

== Description ==
The great shrike-tyrant is the largest species of tyrant flycatcher, weighing an average of about 99 g (3.5 oz). It is 26 to 28 cm (10 to 11 in) long. The sexes have the same plumage. Adults of the nominate subspecies have a mostly grayish brown head with some whitish on the lores and a cinnamon tinge on the ear coverts. Their upperparts are grayish brown. Their wings are mostly a duskier grayish brown with pale brown edges on the flight feathers. Their tail is mostly black with buffy white tips and edges of the outer webs of the outer feathers. Their throat is white with heavy black streaks. Their underparts are a paler grayish brown than their upperparts, with a cinnamon or cinnamon-buff wash on the lower belly and crissum. Subspecies A. l. fortis is larger and slightly brighter than the nominate. Juveniles are browner than adults, with indistinct streaks on the head, back, and upper breast, less streaking on the throat than adults, and a wholly cinnamon-buff belly. Adults of both subspecies have a dark iris, a heavy hooked bill with a black maxilla and a dark-tipped orange mandible, and blackish legs and feet.

== Distribution and habitat ==
The nominate subspecies of the great shrike-tyrant is found along the coast and mountains of Chile from the Atacama Region to Valdivia in the Los Ríos Region. Subspecies A. l. fortis is found in far southern Chile's Aysén and Magallanes regions and in southern Argentina from southern Neuquén Province south into Tierra del Fuego. The species inhabits semi-arid to somewhat moister landscapes including scrublands with cacti and bromeliads, somewhat open shrubby areas and agricultural regions, pastures with nearby shrubby areas, and open Nothofagus woodlands. It shuns heavily woodlands and populated areas. In elevation it ranges from sea level to 1,800 m (5,900 ft) though it mostly occurs below 1,500 m (4,900 ft).

== Behavior ==
=== Movement ===
The great shrike-tyrant is a year-round resident.

=== Feeding ===
The great shrike-tyrant feeds on insects; small mammals, reptiles, and amphibians; and bird eggs and nestlings. It mostly forages in pairs, though the members are typically not close together. It perches on a rock, shrub, or fence and typically captures prey by dropping on it from the perch and in mid-air by "hawking".

=== Breeding ===
The great shrike-tyrant's breeding season has not been defined but includes October and November in Chile. Males make an aerial courtship display during which their outer primaries make a quiet low-pitched whirr. The species' nest is a bulky cup made from sticks lined with grass and wool. It is typically placed in a bush or cactus. The clutch is usually three eggs but ranges from two to four. Nothing else is known about the species' breeding biology.

=== Vocalization ===
The great shrike-tyrant is usually quiet. It does make "t-eek or t-eek-ek" calls.

== Status ==
The IUCN has assessed the great shrike-tyrant as being of Least Concern. It has a large range; its population size is not known and is believed to be stable. No immediate threats have been identified. It is considered uncommon and "becoming rare in [the south] part of range". It is more common in Chile than Argentina and occurs in several national parks in both countries.
