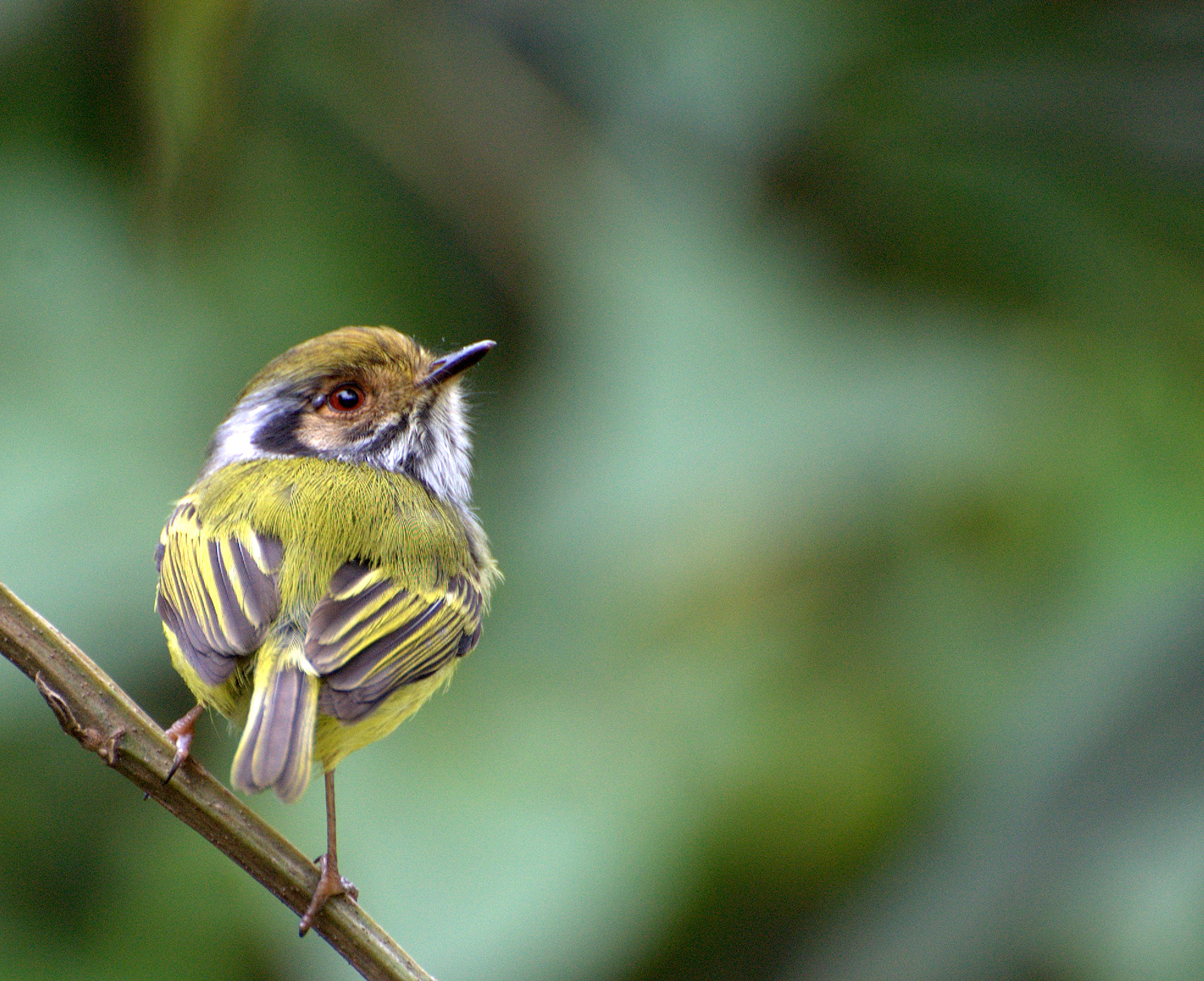
- Eared pygmy tyrant (Myiornis auricularis)

Scientific classification
- Kingdom: Animalia
- Phylum: Chordata
- Class: Aves
- Order: Passeriformes
- Family: Tyrannidae
- Genus: Myiornis; Bertoni, AW, 1901

Type species
- Euscarthmus minutus Bertoni, AW, 1901 = Platyrhynchos auricularis Vieillot, 1818

Species
- see text

= Myiornis =

Genus of birds

Myiornis is a bird genus in the family Tyrannidae. Discounting the hummingbirds, they are some of the smallest birds in the world.

The genus contains four species:

Image	Scientific name	Common name	Distribution
	Myiornis albiventris	White-bellied pygmy tyrant	Bolivia and Peru
	Myiornis auricularis	Eared pygmy tyrant	Brazil, Paraguay and northeastern Argentina.
	Myiornis atricapillus	Black-capped pygmy tyrant	Costa Rica to north-western Ecuador.
	Myiornis ecaudatus	Short-tailed pygmy tyrant	Amazon in northern and central South America.
