= James A. Jobling =

British naturalist and author

- Born: Buckinghamshire
- Occupations: Ornithologist and functionary

James A. Jobling is a British naturalist and author. Jobling is known for his work on the taxonomy of birds, writing and publishing one of the most comprehensive reference works on the etymology of the names of genera and species of birds around the world.

== Biography ==
Jobling was initially a civil servant with experience in finance and land registration. Since childhood, he had an interest in the natural world, especially in birds and their names. He worked for several years writing the Dictionary of Scientific Bird Names, published in 1991 by Oxford University Press. The Dictionary would later be reissued by British publisher Helm in 2010, under the name Helm Dictionary of Scientific Bird Names. Jobling became closely associated with Lynx Edicions through the creation and editing of the HBW Alive Key to Scientific Names in Ornithology (2014–2020), which was later incorporated into the Handbook of the Birds of the World. This work would later be made a part of the online database Birds of the World.

He was a member of the British Ornithologists' Union and a committee member of the British Ornithologists' Club.

== Publications ==
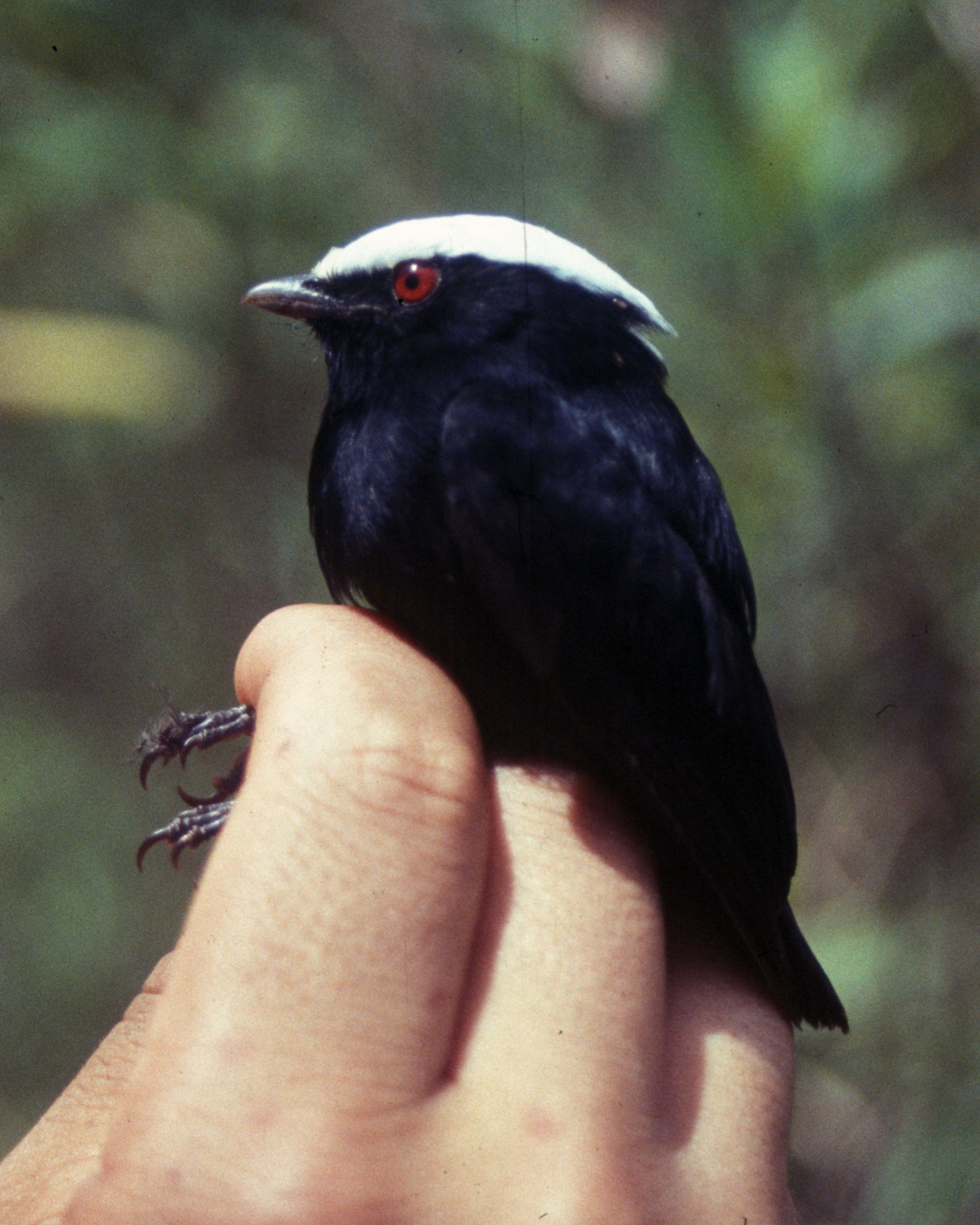
Pseudopipra pipra, originally considered by Carl Linnaeus as congeneric with Pipra pipra. Jobling, along with Guy Kirwan and colleagues, provided its new genus name in a review of phylogenetic evidence.

- Jobling, James A. (1991). A Dictionary of Scientific Bird Names. Oxford University Press. ISBN 978-0-19-854634-4.
- "The Helm Dictionary of Scientific Bird Names: From Aalge to Zusii (New edition)". Reference Reviews. 25 (4): 41–42. 2011-05-03. doi:10.1108/09504121111134070. ISSN 0950-4125.
- Kirwan, Guy M.; David, Normand; Gregory, Steven M. S.; Jobling, James A.; Steinheimer, Frank D.; Brito, Guilherme Renzo Rocha (2016-06-07). "The mistaken manakin: a new genus-group name for Parus pipra Linnaeus, 1758 (Aves: Passeriformes: Pipridae)". Zootaxa. 4121 (1): 89–94. doi:10.11646/zootaxa.4121.1.9. ISSN 1175-5334. PMID 27395209.
- David, Normand; Gregory, Steven M. S.; Kirwan, Guy M.; Jobling, James A.; Steinheimer, Frank D.; Brito, Guilherme Renzo Rocha (2017-01-06). "Addendum to Kirwan et al. (2016, Zootaxa 4121(1): 89–94)". Zootaxa. 4216 (3). doi:10.11646/zootaxa.4216.3.7. ISSN 1175-5334. PMID 28183124.
- Jobling, James A. (1996). The Prince and the Republican. Bull. BOC, 116(5).
- Jobling, James A. (June 2017). "Resolution of a case of secondary homonymy in the genus Sylvia Scopoli, 1769". Bulletin of the British Ornithologists' Club. 137 (2): 159. doi:10.25226/bboc.v137i2.2017.a6. ISSN 0007-1595.
