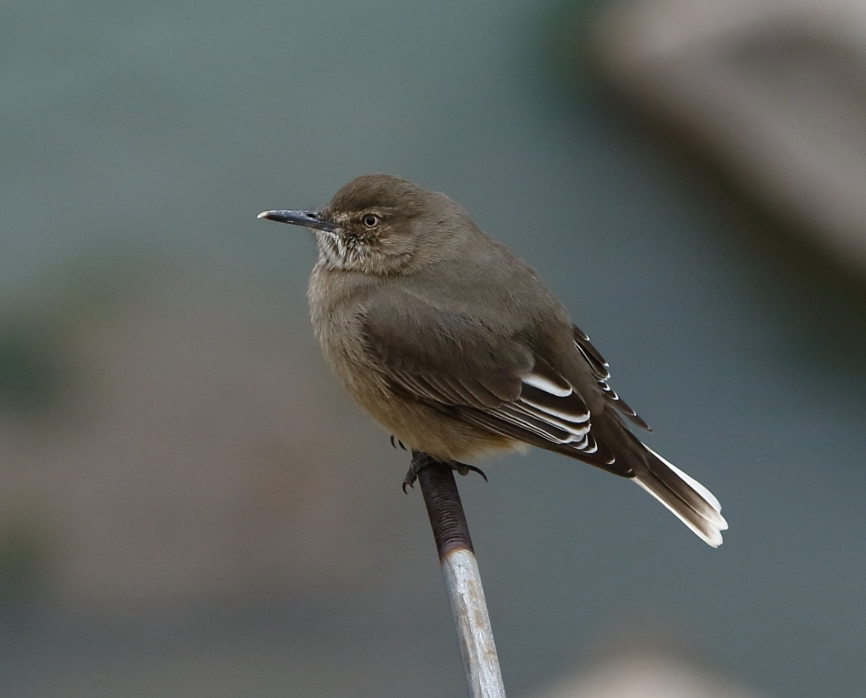
- At Mendoza River, Andes, Las Heras, Mendoza Province, Argentina.

Conservation status
- Least Concern (IUCN 3.1)

Scientific classification
- Kingdom: Animalia
- Phylum: Chordata
- Class: Aves
- Order: Passeriformes
- Family: Tyrannidae
- Genus: Agriornis
- Species: A. montanus

Binomial name
- Agriornis montanus (d'Orbigny & Lafresnaye, 1837)

= Black-billed shrike-tyrant =

Species of bird

The black-billed shrike-tyrant (Agriornis montanus) is a bird species in the Tyrannidae family, the tyrant flycatchers. It is found in Argentina, Bolivia, Chile, Colombia, Ecuador, and Peru, and possibly has occurred as a vagrant to the Falkland Islands.

== Taxonomy and systematics ==
The black-billed shrike-tyrant was formally described in 1837 as Pepoazae montana. It was later transferred to the genus Agriornis that was erected in 1839.

The black-billed shrike-tyrant's taxonomy is unsettled. The IOC recognizes these six subspecies:

- A. m. solitarius Sclater, PL, 1859
- A. m. insolens Sclater, PL & Salvin, 1869
- A. m. intermedius Hellmayr, 1927
- A. m. montanus (d'Orbigny & Lafresnaye, 1837)
- A. m. maritimus (d'Orbigny & Lafresnaye, 1837)
- A. m. fumosus Manuel Nores & Dario Yzurieta, 1983

However, the Clements taxonomy and BirdLife International's Handbook of the Birds of the World include A. m. fumosus within A. m. maritimus.

This article follows the six-subspecies model.

== Description ==
The black-billed shrike-tyrant is 22 to 24 cm (8.7 to 9.4 in) long. The sexes have the same plumage. Adults of the nominate subspecies A. m. montanus have a whitish stripe above the lores, a buffish white broken supercilium, and brown-streaked white cheeks. Their crown and upperparts are dark grayish brown. Their wings are mostly dark grayish brown with whitish tips and edges on the inner flight feathers there wingspan 125 to 136 mm (approx. 12.5 to 13.6 cm). Their underwing coverts are cinnamon-buff to buffy white. Their central pair of tail feathers is blackish; the rest are white with dark bases on their inner webs. Their throat is white with thin blackish streaks, their breast and flanks ashy brown, their mid-belly whitish-tinged brown, and their lower belly and vent whitish.

The other subspecies differ from the nominate and each other thus:

- A. m. solitarius: darker than the nominate with entirely white outer tail feathers
- A. m. insolens: darker than the nominate but lighter than solitarius with mostly white outer tail feathers that sometimes have dusky edges of the inner webs of some
- A. m. maritimus: black central tail feathers have white tips; outer tail feathers have more black at the base than the nominate
- A. m. intermedius: similar to maritimus but with much less black on outer tail feathers
- A. m. fumosus: dark gray upperparts, brownish gray breast, light cinnamon brown upper belly, flight feathers brownish gray with dark brown tips, central tail feathers dark brown with whitish tips, and rest with dark bases and creamy white ends

Adults of all subspecies have a yellowish to ivory iris, a hooked black bill, and blackish legs and feet.

== Distribution and habitat ==
The subspecies of the black-billed shrike-tyrant are found thus:

- A. m. solitarius: Andes from Nariño Department in southwestern Colombia south through Ecuador
- A. m. insolens: Andes of Peru
- A. m. intermedius: Andes from La Paz Department in western Bolivia south into far northern Chile's Tarapacá Region
- A. m. montanus: Andes from southern Beni Department in Bolivia south into northwestern Argentina as far as La Rioja Province
- A. m. maritimus: Andes of central and southern Chile from Tarapacá south to Magallanes Region and west-central and southwestern Argentina from Mendoza Province south to Santa Cruz Province
- A. m. fumosus: Sierras de Córdoba in central Argentina

An isolated population of A. m. maritimus or A. m. fumosus is found in Argentina's Buenos Aires Province. The South American Classification Committee of the American Ornithological Society has unconfirmed Falkland Islands records and classified the species as hypothetical.

The black-billed shrike-tyrant inhabits a wide variety of open, and generally high-elevation, landscapes from the upper temperate zone into the páramo. These include grasslands and agricultural areas that have scattered bushes and trees, the edges of Polylepis forest, and Puna grassland with perches such as fences and boulders. They also include rocky slopes and cliffs, villages, and isolated buildings. In elevation it ranges between 2,500 and 3,700 m (8,200 and 12,100 ft) in Colombia, mostly between 3,000 and 4,000 m (9,800 and 13,100 ft) in Ecuador but down to 2,500 m (8,200 ft) in the south, and between 3,000 and 4,500 m (9,800 and 14,800 ft) and locally as low as 2,200 m (7,200 ft) in Peru. In Chile and Argentina, it mostly occurs between 3,000 and 4,000 m (9,800 and 13,100 ft) and rarely down to sea level in Chile.

== Behavior ==
=== Movement ===
The black-billed shrike-tyrant is a year-round resident in most of its range, but the population in southern Patagonia moves north for the austral winter.

=== Feeding ===
The black-billed shrike-tyrant has an eclectic diet including insects and other arthropods, small mammals, reptiles, amphibians, bird eggs and nestlings, and seeds. It usually forages by itself. It perches on a rock, bush, or fence post, and takes most prey on the ground or by "hawking" in mid-air. Sometimes it hovers before dropping onto prey.

=== Breeding ===
The black-billed shrike-tyrant's breeding season has not been fully defined. Breeding activity has been recorded in December and January in Argentina; in November in Chile; in March, May, October, and December in Peru; in August, December, and January in Ecuador; and in February and April in Bolivia. Males perform an aerial courtship display during which their tail feathers make a faint, low-pitched whirr. The species' nest is a large, loose, open cup made from sticks and grass, lined with wool. It can be placed on the ground or vegetation, in a rock crevice, or openings under a roof or in a wall of a human structure. The clutch is two to three eggs. The incubation period, time to fledging, and details of parental care are not known.

=== Vocalization ===
The black-billed shrike-tyrant is not highly vocal but sings more frequently at dawn than during the day. Its voice has been described as "a loud, ringing wheee, wheeeu or just sheeeu." Another description calls its song "a loud, musical, whistled, rising-falling WEEYOO" and its call "a rising wee?".

== Status ==
The IUCN has assessed the black-billed shrike-tyrant as being of Least Concern. It has a huge range; its population size is unknown and is believed to be stable. No immediate threats have been identified. It is considered local in Colombia, "wide-ranging but never especially numerous" in Ecuador, and "the most common and widespread shrike-tyrant" in Peru. It occurs in several protected areas.

== Gallery ==
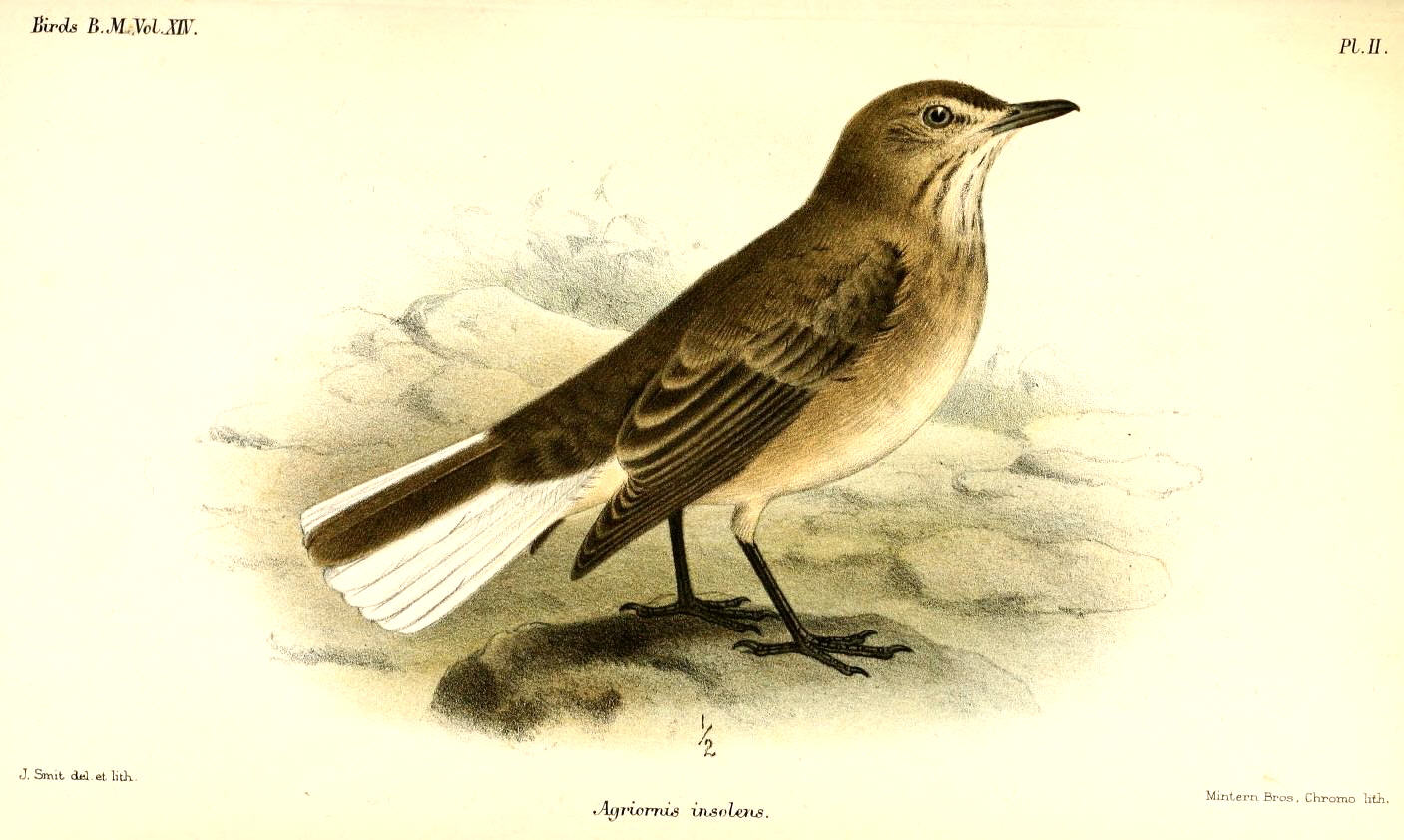
Subspecies A. m. insolens, illustration by Joseph Smit, 1888

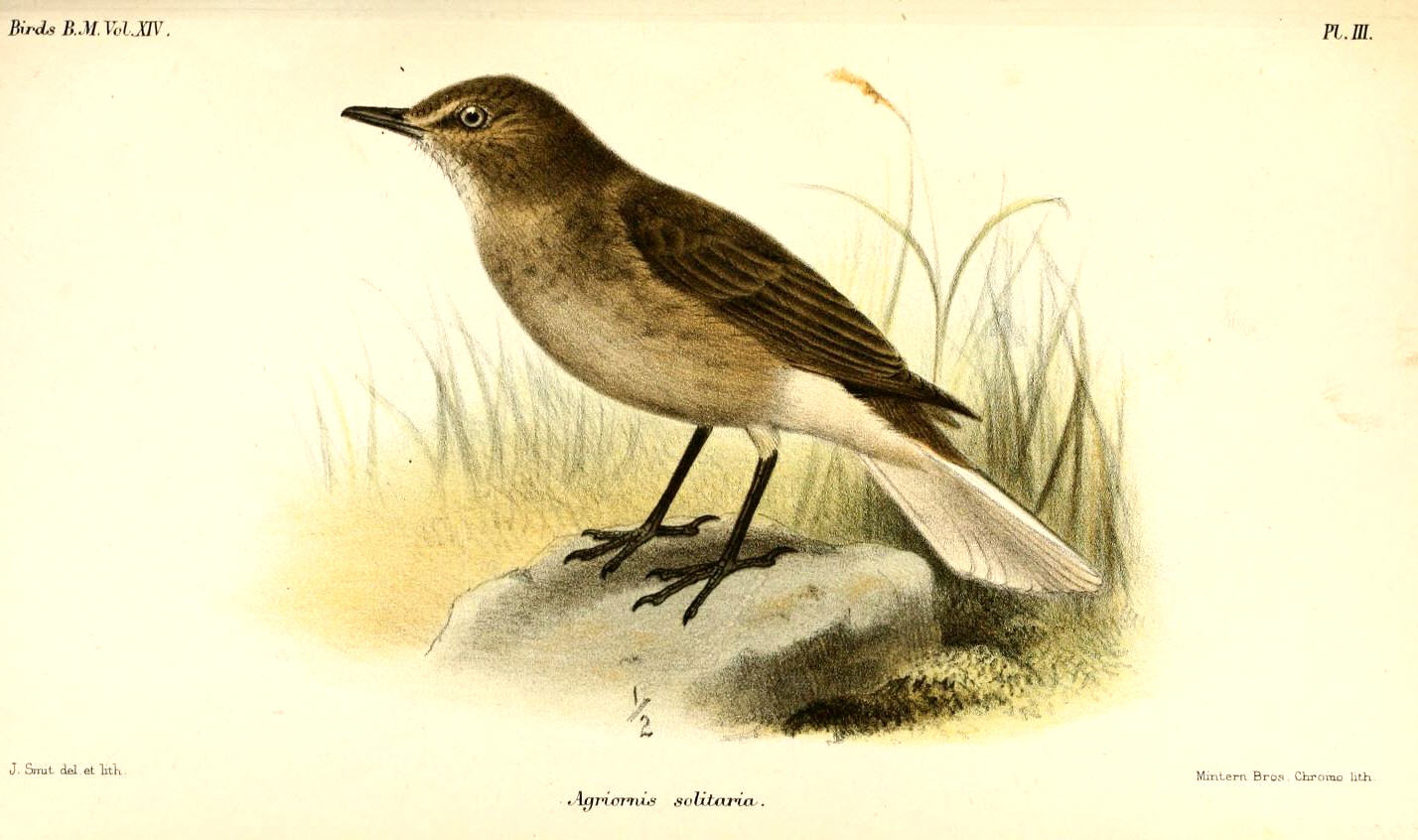
Subspecies A. m. solitarius, illustration by Joseph Smit, 1888
