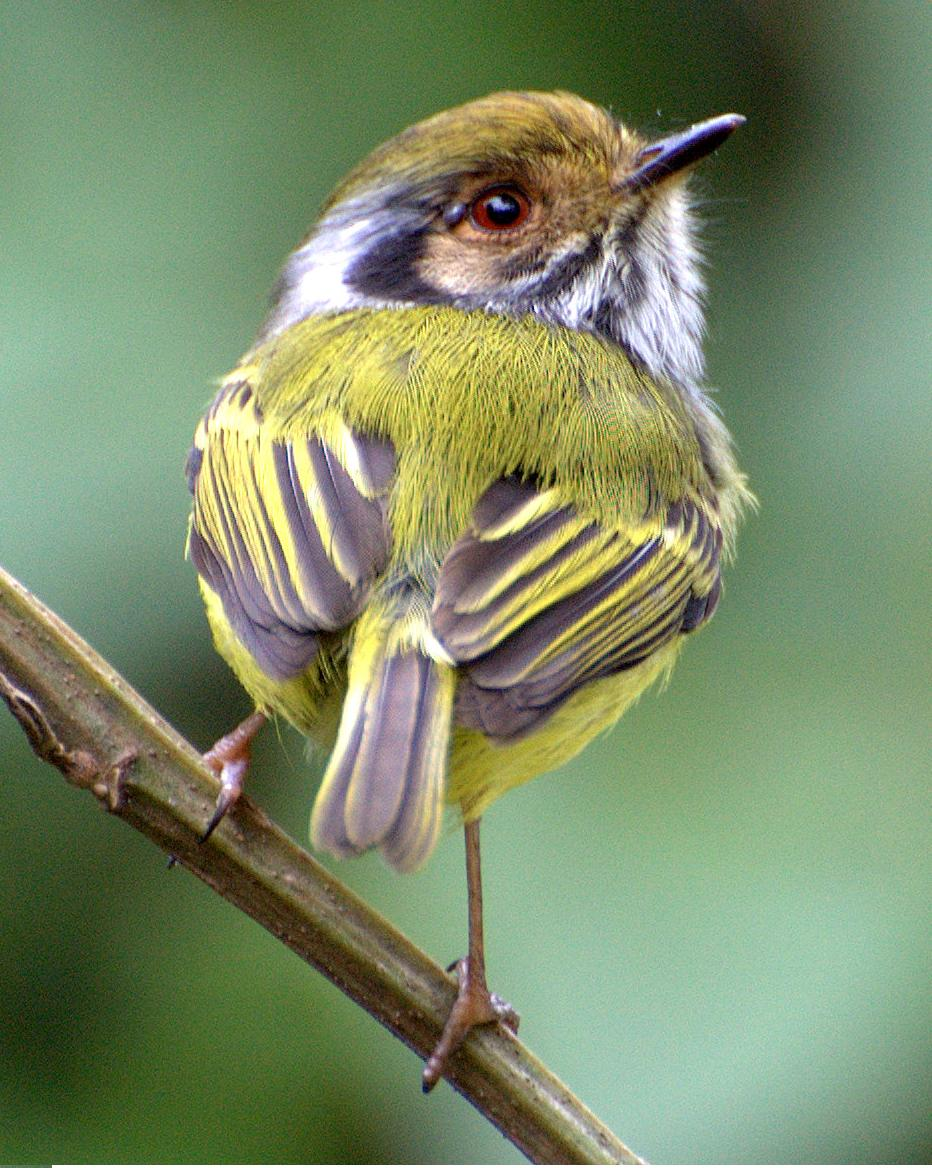

Conservation status
- Least Concern (IUCN 3.1)

Scientific classification
- Kingdom: Animalia
- Phylum: Chordata
- Class: Aves
- Order: Passeriformes
- Family: Tyrannidae
- Genus: Myiornis
- Species: M. auricularis

Binomial name
- Myiornis auricularis (Vieillot, 1818)

= Eared pygmy tyrant =

Species of bird

The eared pygmy tyrant (Myiornis auricularis) is a species of bird in the family Tyrannidae, the tyrant flycatchers. It is found in Argentina, Brazil, and Paraguay.

== Taxonomy and systematics ==
The eared pygmy tyrant has two subspecies, the nominate M. a. auricularis (Vieillot, 1818) and M. a. cinereicollis (Wied-Neuwied, M, 1831). The Clements taxonomy includes a potential third subspecies, "Eared Pygmy-Tyrant (Pernambuco)", as "Myiornis auricularis [undescribed form]". One author has treated the white-bellied pygmy tyrant (M. albiventris) as a subspecies of the eared pygmy tyrant but major taxonomic systems retain it as a full species.

The eared pygmy tyrant's taxonomy has undergone other changes as well. It was originally described in 1818 as Platyrhynchos auricularis, part of a complex of "flatbills". Subspecies M. a. cinereicollis was originally described as a full species, Euscarthmus cinereicollis. Genus Platyrhynchos eventually was limited to some Old World species and then lost altogether, and Euscarthmus was eventually limited to a few New World species. The eared pygmy tyrant landed in Myiornis, which several authors have suggested should be merged into genus Hemitriccus.

== Description ==
The eared pygmy tyrant is about 7 to 9 cm (2.8 to 3.5 in) long and weighs about 5 g (0.18 oz). It is a very small, large-headed bird with a dramatic facial pattern. The sexes have the same plumage. Adults of the nominate subspecies have a buffish cinnamon area surrounding the eye, whitish ear coverts with a black crescent behind them, and a black patch below the eye. Their crown is bright olive with a brown tinge, their nape and neck gray, and their back and rump bright olive. Their wings are dusky with bright olive-yellow edges on the flight feathers and tips of the coverts; the latter show as two indistinct wing bars. Their tail is dusky. Their throat and upper breast are white with thin black streaks and the rest of their underparts are bright yellow with some olive streaks. Subspecies M. a. cinereicollis is variable but usually has paler, buffy whitish, ear coverts. Both subspecies have an orange iris, a blackish bill, and pinkish legs and feet.

== Distribution and habitat ==
The eared pygmy tyrant is a bird of the Atlantic Forest. Subspecies M. a. cinereicollis is the more northern of the two. It is found in eastern Brazil in southeastern Bahia, Minas Gerais, and Espírito Santo. There are also a few scattered records north of Bahia. The nominate subspecies is found in southeastern Brazil between Mato Grosso do Sul and Rio de Janeiro state and south to northern Rio Grande do Sul, and through eastern Paraguay into northeastern Argentina's Misiones Province. The species primarily inhabits dense vegetation at the edges of humid forest. It occasionally is found in the forest interior and in trees in meadows adjoining the forest. In elevation it ranges from sea level to about 1,250 m (4,100 ft).

== Behavior ==
=== Movement ===
The eared pygmy tyrant is a year-round resident.

=== Feeding ===
The eared pygmy tyrant feeds on insects, though details are lacking. It mostly forages in the vegetation's lower and middle levels up to about 3 m (10 ft) above the ground, taking prey using short upward sallies from a perch to grab it from leaves.

=== Breeding ===
The eared pygmy tyrant's breeding season has not been fully defined but includes October to December. Its nest is a "purse" with a side entrance, made from twigs and dry leaves and sometimes has a dangling "tail". It typically hangs from a horizontal branch about 1 to 3 m (3 to 10 ft) above the ground. The clutch is two or three eggs. The female alone is thought to incubate but both parents provision nestlings. The incubation period and time to fledging are not known. There are records of nest parasitism by the pavonine cuckoo (Dromococcyx pavoninus).

=== Vocalization ===
The eared pygmy tyrant's song is a "very high, short, clear trill, often preceded by [a] lower, short 'wit', together as 'wit-trruh' ". Its call is "high, stressed 'pic' notes".

== Status ==
The IUCN has assessed the eared pygmy tyrant as being of Least Concern. It has a large range; its population size is not known and is believed to be decreasing. No immediate threats have been identified. It is considered fairly common. "Although much suitable habitat for this species has been destroyed or heavily degraded, it still occurs in many national parks and other protected areas throughout its range."
