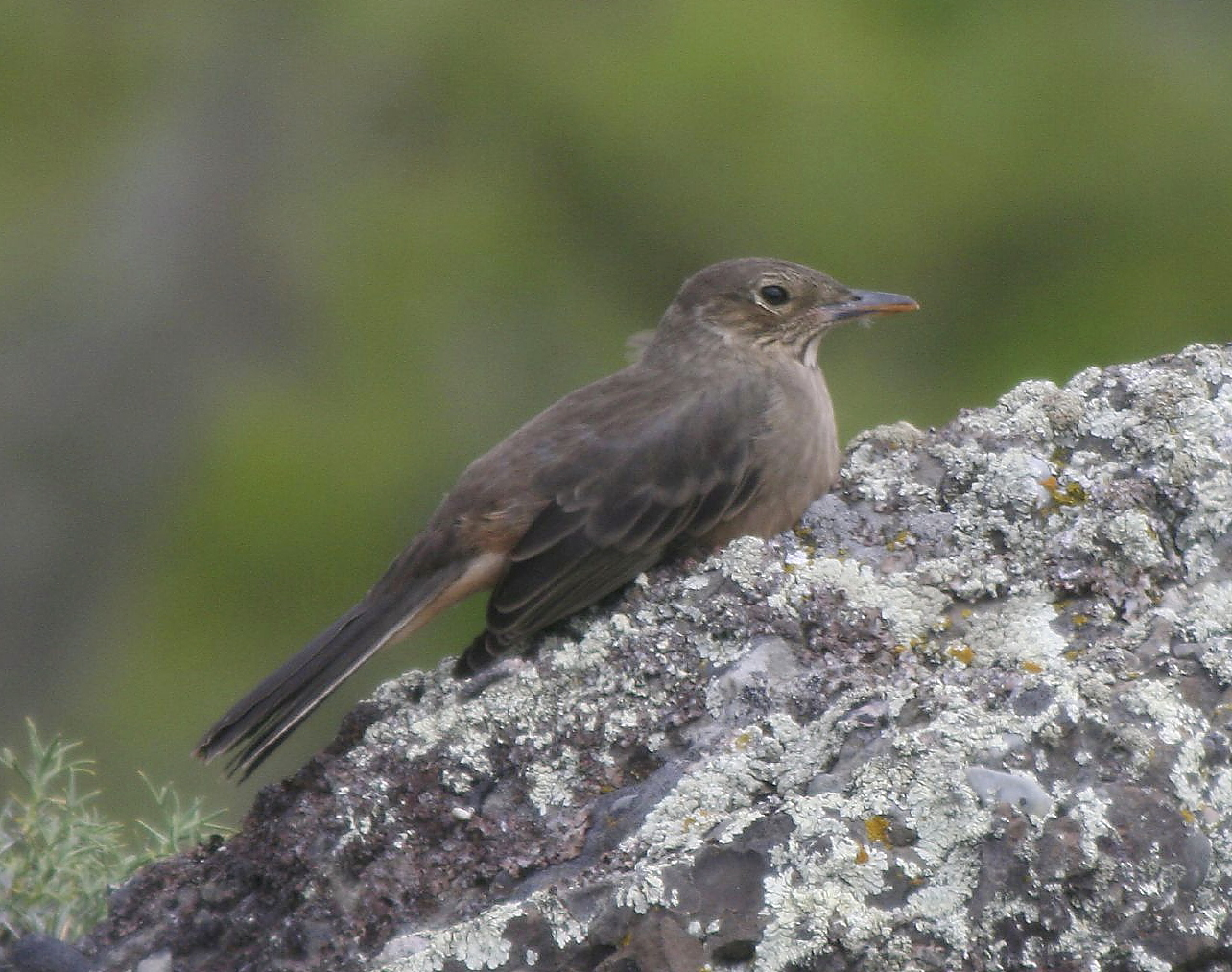
- Great shrike-tyrant, (Agriornis lividus)

Scientific classification
- Kingdom: Animalia
- Phylum: Chordata
- Class: Aves
- Order: Passeriformes
- Family: Tyrannidae
- Genus: Agriornis; Gould, 1839

Type species
- Agriornis micropterus Gould, 1839

= Shrike-tyrant =

Shrike-tyrants

Genus of birds

The shrike-tyrants are a genus, Agriornis, of birds in the tyrant flycatcher family Tyrannidae. The members of this genus are found in open habitats in western and southern South America, usually at high elevations. They are large and heavy billed by tyrant-flycatcher standards, and include the largest representative of the family, the great shrike-tyrant. These five species all have a dull brownish or greyish plumage. Despite their name, any similarity with the shrikes is superficial. Many field guides note their greater (but also superficial) resemblance to thrushes.

== Species ==
The genus contains the following 5 species:

Image	Common name	Scientific name	Distribution
	Black-billed shrike-tyrant	Agriornis montanus	Argentina, Bolivia, Chile, Colombia, Ecuador, Peru
	Lesser shrike-tyrant	Agriornis murinus	northern Argentina, Bolivia and Paraguay.
	White-tailed shrike-tyrant	Agriornis albicauda	Argentina, Bolivia, Chile, Ecuador, and Peru.
	Grey-bellied shrike-tyrant	Agriornis microptera	Argentina, Bolivia, Chile, Paraguay, Peru, and Uruguay.
	Great shrike-tyrant	Agriornis lividus	Chile and adjacent areas of south-western Argentina.
