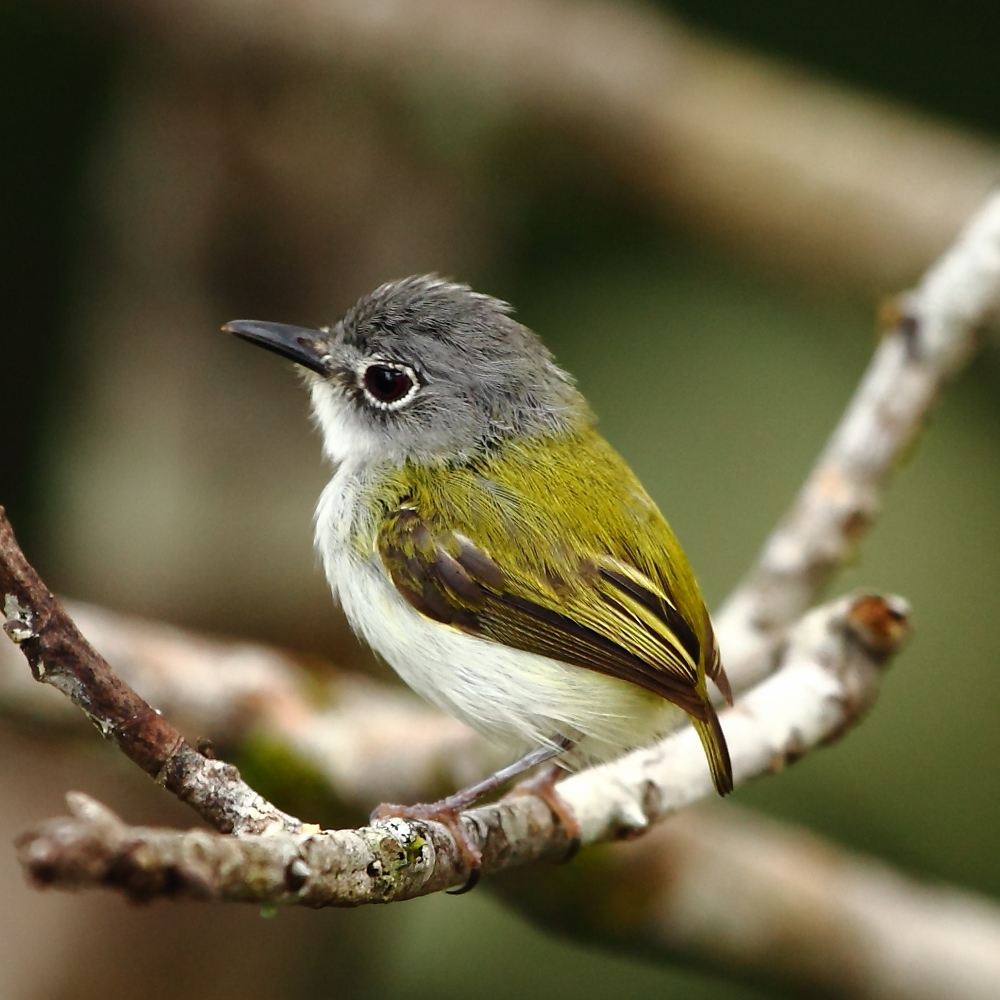
- At Manaus, Amazonas, Brazil

Conservation status
- Least Concern (IUCN 3.1)

Scientific classification
- Kingdom: Animalia
- Phylum: Chordata
- Class: Aves
- Order: Passeriformes
- Family: Tyrannidae
- Genus: Myiornis
- Species: M. ecaudatus

Binomial name
- Myiornis ecaudatus (D'Orbigny & Lafresnaye, 1837)

= Short-tailed pygmy tyrant =

Species of bird

The short-tailed pygmy tyrant (Myiornis ecaudatus) is a species of bird in the family Tyrannidae, the tyrant flycatchers. It is found on Trinidad and in every mainland South American country except Argentina, Chile, Paraguay, and Uruguay.

== Taxonomy and systematics ==
The short-tailed pygmy tyrant was originally described in 1837 as Todirostrum ecaudatum. In the early to mid-twentieth century it was placed in genus Perissotriccus which was later merged into Myiornis. Several authors have suggested that genus Myiornis should be merged into genus Hemitriccus.

The short-tailed pygmy tyrant has two subspecies, the nominate M. e. ecaudatus (D'Orbigny & Lafresnaye, 1837) and M. e. miserabilis (Chubb, C, 1919). Between about 1940 and 1970 some authors included what is now the black-capped pygmy tyrant (M. atricapillus) as a third subspecies. The short-tailed and black-capped pygmy tyrants apparently form a superspecies.

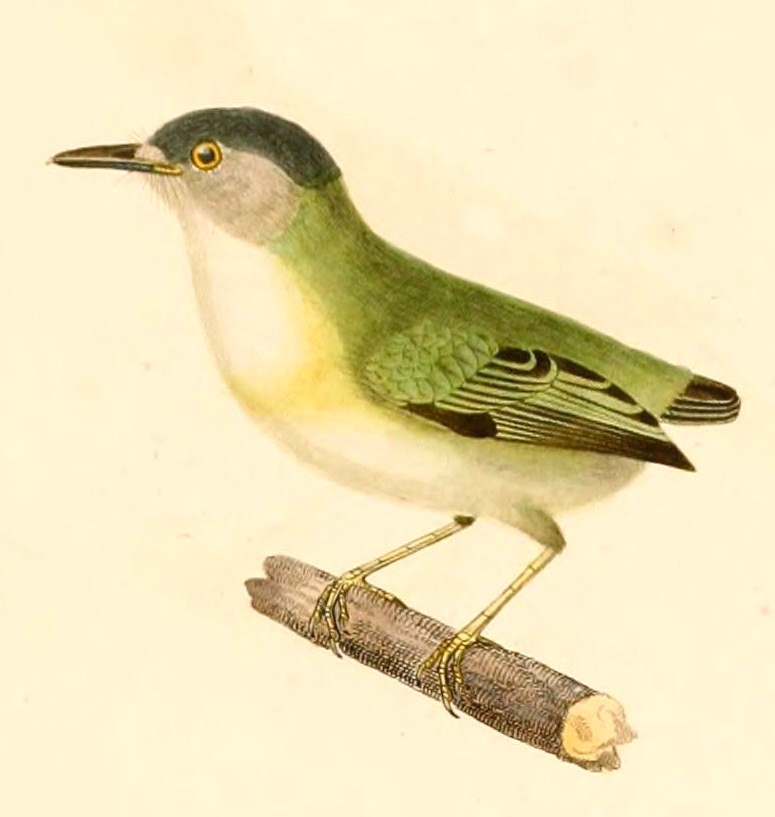
1847 illustration of Todirostrum ecaudatum (Myiornis ecaudatus)

== Description ==
The short-tailed pygmy tyrant is 6 to 7 cm (2.4 to 2.8 in) long and weighs about 4.2 g (0.15 oz). It is the smallest passerine on Earth. The sexes have the same plumage. Adults of the nominate subspecies have a mostly dark gray head with blackish lores, a prominent white spot above the lores, and a white eye-ring; the last two give a spectacled appearance. Their back, rump, and uppertail coverts are bright olive green. Their wings are dusky with bright olive edges on the flight feathers and tips on the coverts; the latter show as two faint wing bars. They have an extremely short, mostly black, tail. Their throat and underparts are white with a pale yellow tinge on the crissum. They have a brown to dark iris, a black bill that is unusually long for a bird its size, and pinkish legs and feet. Subspecies M. e. miserabilis has a darker and duller green back than the nominate, with a darker gray crown and nape, grayer or pale olivaceous sides on the breast, and darker legs. Juveniles of both subspecies resemble their respective adults. The short-tailed pygmy tyrant resembles the larger slate-headed tody-flycatcher (Poecilotriccus sylvia) but "is much more likely to be mistaken for a large beetle or insect, [especially] in flight, than another bird".

== Distribution and habitat ==
The short-tailed pygmy tyrant is primarily a bird of the Amazon Basin though it is found outside that area. The nominate subspecies is found on Trinidad and from the southeastern third of Colombia east through the southern half of Venezuela, the Guianas, and northern Brazil north of the Amazon and east of the upper Negro River. It is found also in the Andes of northwestern Venezuela and coastally in Carabobo and Sucre states. (The map in McMullan's Field Guide to the Birds of Colombia shows a much more extensive range in that country than do other maps.) Subspecies M. e. miserabilis is found in eastern Ecuador, eastern Peru, northern and eastern Bolivia, and Brazil south of the Amazon. The species inhabits the interior, edges, and gaps in humid forest and also nearby secondary and transitional forest in the lowlands and Andean foothills. In elevation it occurs below 500 m (1,600 ft) in Colombia, below 400 m (1,300 ft) in Ecuador, below 1,000 m (3,300 ft) in Peru, and below 950 m (3,100 ft) in Brazil. In Venezuela it occurs below 500 m (1,600 ft) north of the Orinoco River and below 900 m (3,000 ft) south of it.

== Behavior ==
=== Movement ===
The short-tailed pygmy tyrant is a year-round resident.

=== Feeding ===
The short-tailed pygmy tyrant feeds on insects. It typically forages singly or in pairs and very rarely joins mixed-species feeding flocks. It mostly forages in the forest canopy though lower at the edges and in gaps. It takes prey mostly by using short upward sallies from a perch to grab it from leaves, and also sometimes gleans it while briefly hovering after a short flight.

=== Breeding ===
The short-tailed pygmy tyrant's breeding season varies geographically; it includes February to May in Colombia, June to September in Brazil, and August to October in Peru. There are single breeding records from each of Venezuela and Suriname in January. The species' nest is a domed bag with a side entrance under a small "awning". It is made from a variety of materials including moss, grass, dry leaves, and rootlets lined with hair or soft plant fibers and down. It often has a "beard" of loose material hanging from its underside. It typically hangs from a branch between 1 and 8 m (3 and 26 ft) above the ground. The clutch is two eggs that are white with brownish to cinnamon spots. The female alone is believed to incubate the clutch but both parents provision nestlings. The incubation period and time to fledging are not known.

=== Vocalization ===
Sources compare the short-tailed pygmy tyrant's vocalizations to sounds made by insects and frogs. The most common is "a soft trilled, purr-like call, sometimes leading into long series of short, squeaky "creek" notes beginning slowly and accelerating, 'cre'e'e'e'e', k'e'e'e'e' ". Another rendition is teeeee-tuuuuur. Its calls include "high, rising treet or peet? notes" than can be doubled or in a series. Another author describes these as a "'crreek' or 'tstrreep' ".

== Status ==
The IUCN has assessed the short-tailed pygmy tyrant as being of Least Concern. It has an extremely large range; its population size is not known and is believed to be decreasing. No immediate threats have been identified. It is considered fairly common in Colombia, "local (just overlooked?)" in Ecuador, "uncommon but widespread" in Peru, and "fairly common but easily overlooked" in Venezuela. It "[o]ccurs in many national parks and other protected areas throughout its range".
