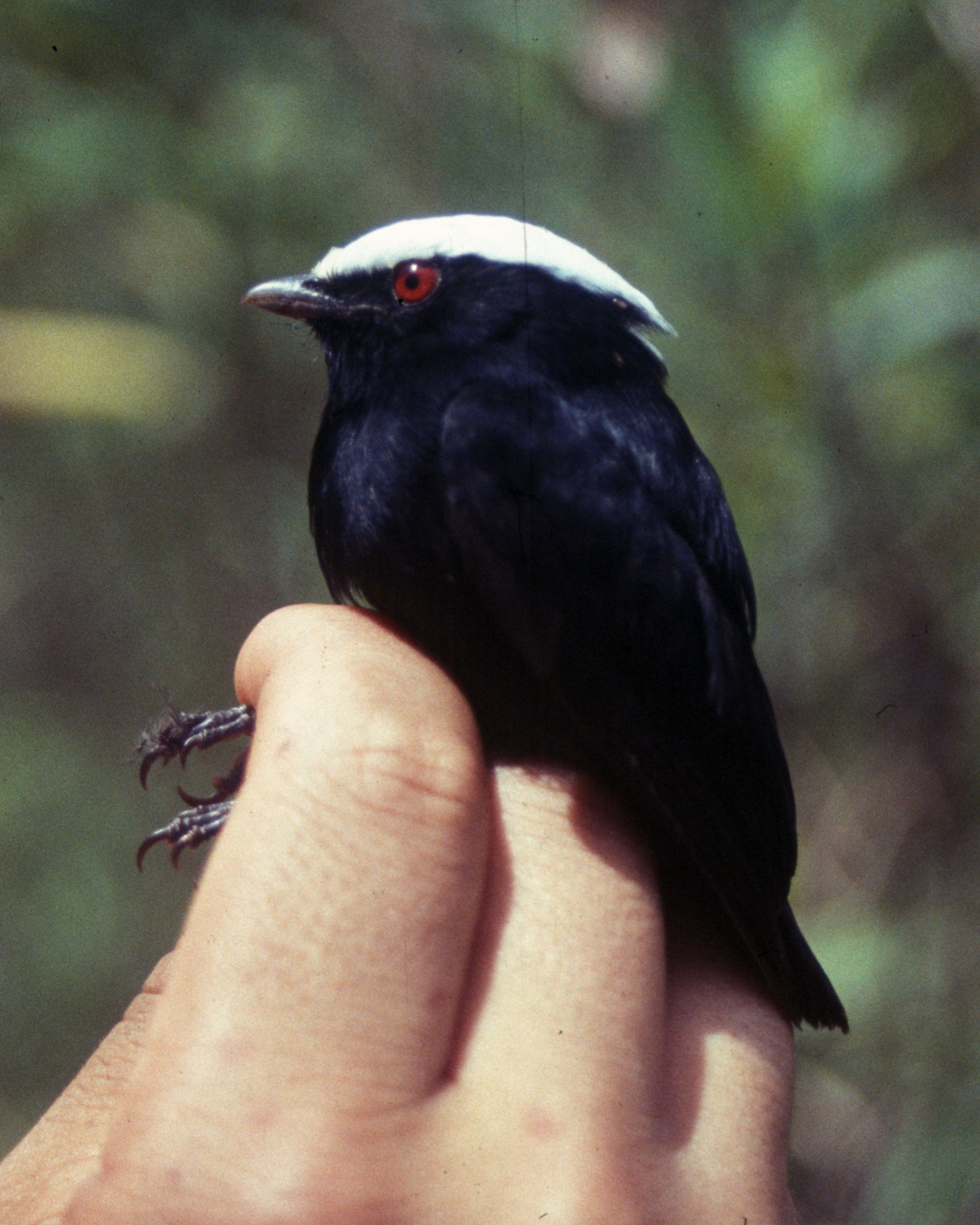
- Male

Conservation status
- Least Concern (IUCN 3.1)

Scientific classification
- Kingdom: Animalia
- Phylum: Chordata
- Class: Aves
- Order: Passeriformes
- Family: Pipridae
- Genus: Pseudopipra; Kirwan et al, 2016
- Species: P. pipra

Binomial name
- Pseudopipra pipra (Linnaeus, 1758)

Synonyms
- Parus pipra; Linnaeus, 1758: Pipra pipra (Linnaeus, 1758); Pipra leucocilla Linnaeus, 1766

Audio
- Call recorded in Ecuador

= White-crowned manakin =

Species of bird

The white-crowned manakin (Pseudopipra pipra) is a small passerine bird in the manakin family Pipridae. This common and extremely widespread manakin is one of the most easily identified, even in female plumage. It is a resident breeder in the tropical New World from Costa Rica to northeastern Peru and eastern Brazil. It was traditionally placed in the genus Pipra, but is now placed in its own monotypic genus Pseudopipra. It is a small, compact bird about 10 cm (3.9 in) long. Males have black plumage with a white crown which can be erected as a crest, the only member of the Pipridae to possess both an all-black body and a gleaming white crown. Females and juveniles are olive-green, with a grey head and throat, and greyish-green or olive underparts. At breeding time, males are involved in a lekking behaviour. This is a fairly common species with a wide range, and the International Union for Conservation of Nature has rated its conservation status as being of "least concern".

== Taxonomy ==
The white-crowned manakin was formally described by the Swedish naturalist Carl Linnaeus in 1758 in the tenth edition of his Systema Naturae and given the binomial name Parus pipra. Linnaeus based his short description on that published by the Dutch collector Albertus Seba in 1735 in his Thesaurus and although Linnaeus specified the location as in Indiis, it is probable that Seba's specimen came from Surinam. The specific name pipra is the Ancient Greek word for a small unidentified bird mentioned by Aristotle. The white-crowned manakin was subsequently placed in the genus Pipra. In 1992, the American ornithologist Richard Prum published a study of the syringeal morphology of birds in Pipra. He found that the genus was polyphyletic and proposed that it should be split with the white-crowned manakin placed in the resurrected genus Dixiphia that had originally been introduced by the German ornithologist Ludwig Reichenbach in 1850. Subsequent molecular phylogenetic studies confirmed that Pipra, as traditionally defined, was polyphyletic and most ornithologists followed Prum and placed the white-crowned manakin in Dixiphia. However, in 2016 Guy Kirwan and colleagues showed that Dixiphia was actually a junior synonym of Arundinicola and erected the genus Pseudopipra as a replacement. There are 13 recognised subspecies.

== Distribution and habitat ==
White-crowned Manakin is a widespread species, with populations in southern Central America, northern South America, and some parts of the Amazonia. There are reports for an extremely isolated population in a relatively small area of the Atlantic Forest of eastern Brazil. It is common in mountain foothills, breeding mainly between 800 and 1600 m, although in northeastern Venezuela it apparently occurs down to sea level.

This is a species of the understory of wet forest and adjacent tall second growth. Occupies dense humid forest and adjacent tall secondary woodland, but is also found in younger secondary forest, sandy-belt and isolated 'islands' of forest in savannas in the Orinoco and Rio Negro drainage, including Amazonian caatingas or campinaranas. In Ecuador, this manakins seems to be largely absent from level-ground terra firme forest, instead preferring hilly terra firme above 250 m. In the Colombian Andes it generally occurs at 600–1,200 m, although at their northernmost extremity, the species has occurred as low as 100 m.

== Description ==
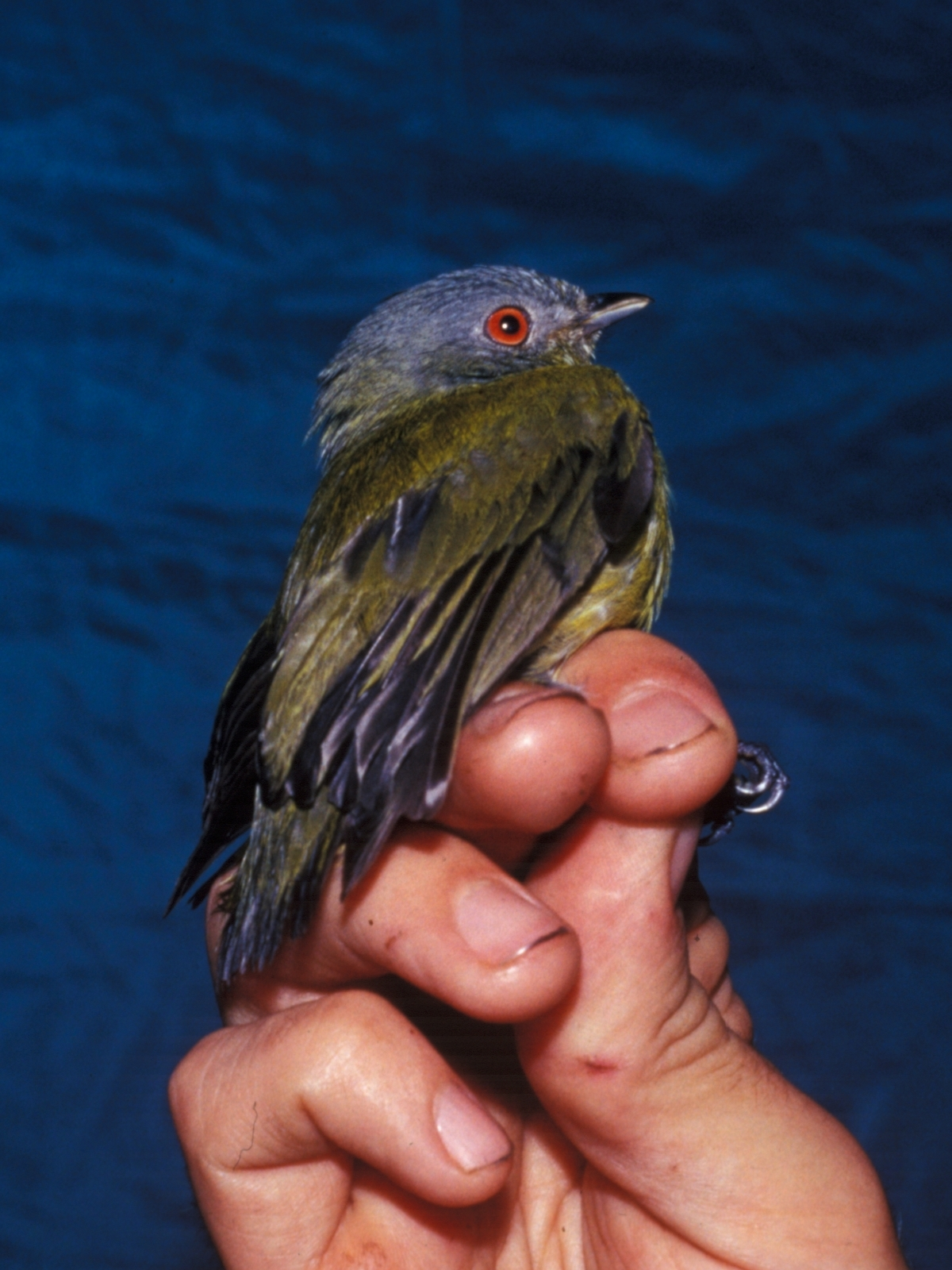
Female

The white-crowned manakin is 9–10 cm (3.5–3.9 in) in length. The male of the nominate subspecies has an average weight of 11.0 g (0.39 oz); the female is slightly heavier and on average weighs 12.8 g (0.45 oz). It is a compact short-tailed bird with a stout hooked bill, dark legs, red eyes and striking male plumage.

The adult male is mostly black with a white crown which can be erected as a low crest. His call is a buzzy jeeeee, louder and preceded by a popping p-p-p chee when displaying.

The female and young males are olive-green with a grey head and throat, and grey-green or olive underparts. The female of the eastern Andean race coracina is brighter and greener above and below than nominate pipra, but the combination of a grey head and red eyes makes specific identification relatively easy for a female white-crowned manakin of any race.

== Ecology ==
Like other manakins, this species has a fascinating breeding display at a communal lek, but the leks of this species are much more dispersed than the small cleared areas favoured by most manakins, with 3-4 males just within earshot of each other, and up to 100 m apart. Males fly between horizontal perches 3–12 m high and up to 50 m apart with a swooping flight, or, when a female is present, a slow butterfly-like flutter.

The white-crowned manakin feeds low in the trees on fruit and some insects, both plucked from the foliage in flight.

== Breeding ==
Nests are generally sited within open forest with denser surrounding understory vegetation, often in treefall gaps or other openings. An open cup of brownish-yellow (or similarly colored) vegetable fibers, fungal hyphae (Marasmius sp.: Marasmiaceae), and sometimes fragments of palm fronds, covered on the outside with dead leaves and bound together and to the substrate using spider webs, built 1.0–9.8 m above ground in the horizontal fork of an understory shrub or small tree, up to c. 19 m tall. Clutch two dirty white eggs, virtually entirely covered by vinous-brown markings (85, 84), although there can be substantial variation in both the depth of the background color and extent of the markings, even within the same clutch, size 20.5 × 13.5 mm.

Incubation time and fledging periods are not known. All facets of the exclusively female (parental) care remain to be elucidated.

== Status ==
This bird has a very wide range, is fairly common and is presumed to have a large total population. The population trend is thought to be downwards but nevertheless, the International Union for Conservation of Nature has rated the bird's conservation status as being of "least concern". Predicted levels of climate change could have a near-catastrophic effect on this species' habitat and range.
