= Birds of the World =

Online database of ornithological data

- Website type: Wildlife database
- Available in: English, with bird names in 96 languages
- Creator: Cornell Lab of Ornithology
- Website: birdsoftheworld.org
- Launched: March 2020
- Current status: Active

Birds of the World (BoW) is an online database of ornithological data adapted from the Handbook of the Birds of the World and contemporary reference works, including Birds of North America, Neotropical Birds Online, and Bird Families of the World. The database is published and maintained by the Cornell Lab of Ornithology and collects data on bird observations through integration with eBird. The database requires a subscription to access the majority of its entries, but offers institutional access to many libraries and birding-related organizations, participating in the National Information Standards Organization's Shared E-Resource Understanding practice as a publisher.

The database is frequently cited in regional checklists and distribution map studies, either as a point of comparison or a source of data.

== History ==
Birds of the World was originally developed in the early 1990s through collaboration between the American Ornithologists' Union, the Cornell Lab of Ornithology, and the Academy of Natural Sciences of Drexel University. The goal of the project was to produce an illustrated guide to all of the birds of the world; its first iteration was in the 17-volume Handbook of the Birds of the World, published by Lynx Edicions over the course of 22 years, from 1992 to 2014. After the Cornell Lab of Ornithology acquired the rights to the contents of the Handbook of the Birds of the World, the online database was launched in March 2020.

A significant portion of the audiovisual content available in Birds of the World is collected through citizen science data collection as provided by eBird. Content is also included from the Macaulay Library, as it was gathered in the Internet Bird Collection by Josep del Hoyo, the founder of Lynx Edicions, and his colleagues in 2002.

== Description ==
Birds of the World is a subscription-access database that aims to describe comprehensive life history information on birds. This includes:

- Species accounts
  - Details on taxonomy, habitat, breeding, diet, and behaviors
- Family accounts
- Hybrid and subspecies descriptions and photos
- Migration and range maps
- IUCN Conservation Status
- Literature cited
- Common names in multiple languages

=== Free resources ===
Birds of the World provides various resources other than those provided with an institutional or individual subscription to the service. James A. Jobling's Dictionary of Scientific Bird Names, which would be published by Lynx Edicions as the HBW Alive Key to Scientific Names In Ornithology, is accessible as a searchable database on the Birds of the World website, allowing for free access to the definitions of the various scientific names of birds. The HBW Alive Key has been the underpinning for developments between the Cornell Lab and BirdLife International to produce a unified checklist of the birds of the world, and is currently used to form the list of bird species on the IUCN Red List.
