= Galgera =

Scientific classification
- Kingdom: Plantae
- Clade: Tracheophytes
- Clade: Angiosperms
- Clade: Eudicots
- Clade: Asterids
- Order: Asterales
- Family: Asteraceae
- Subfamily: Asteroideae
- Tribe: Inuleae
- Subtribe: Plucheinae
- Genus: Galgera; Anderb. & Bengtson
- Species: G. decurrens

Binomial name
- Galgera decurrens (Vahl) Anderb. & Bengtson

Synonyms
- Blumea decurrens (Vahl) Merxm.; Blumea gariepina DC.; Conyza arabica Willd.; Erigeron decurrens Vahl (1790) (basionym); Laggera arabica Deflers; Laggera decurrens (Vahl) Hepper & J.R.I.Wood; Laggera gariepina (DC.) Randeria; Placus gariepinus (DC.) Kuntze

Genus of flowering plants

Galgera is a genus of flowering plants in the family Asteraceae. It includes a single species, Galgera decurrens, which is native to Algeria's Hoggar Mountains, northeastern Africa from Chad to Somalia, the southern Arabian Peninsula, and southern Africa from Angola and Zambia to South Africa, where it grows in seasonally dry areas.

Galgera decurrens is an herbaceous perennial with grey-green leaves and an erect habit which grows from 25 to 200 cm tall. The entire plant is highly aromatic and covered with dense wooly hairs.

The plant is locally harvested from the wild for medicine and as a mosquito and general insect repellent.
