= Sachsia (plant) =

Scientific classification
- Kingdom: Plantae
- Clade: Tracheophytes
- Clade: Angiosperms
- Clade: Eudicots
- Clade: Asterids
- Order: Asterales
- Family: Asteraceae
- Subfamily: Asteroideae
- Tribe: Inuleae
- Genus: Sachsia; Griseb.

Synonyms
- Rhodogeron Griseb., Cat. Pl. Cub.: 151 (1866)

Genus of plants

Sachsia is a genus of West Indian and Floridian plants in the elecampane tribe within the sunflower family.

The genus is named in honour of German botanist Julius von Sachs (1832–1897), who was a German botanist, Plant physiologist and botanical illustrator who taught at the Charles University, Prague.

== Species ==
Includes 3 Accepted Species;

- Sachsia coronopifolia (Griseb.) Anderb. – Cuba
- Sachsia polycephala (Griseb. – Bahamas, Cuba, Hispaniola, Jamaica, Florida
- Sachsia tricephala (Griseb. - Cuba
