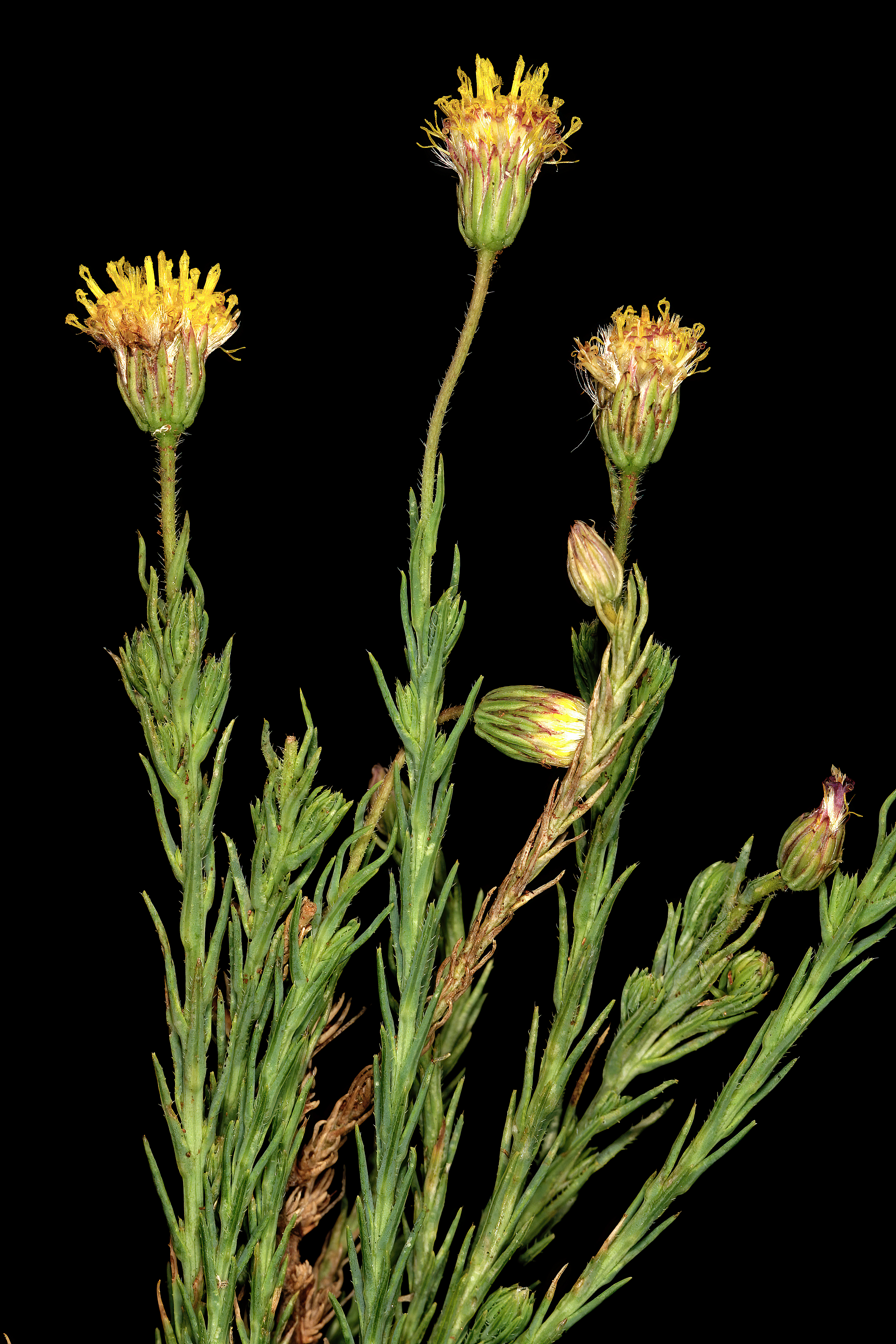
- Nolletia ciliaris

Scientific classification
- Kingdom: Plantae
- Clade: Tracheophytes
- Clade: Angiosperms
- Clade: Eudicots
- Clade: Asterids
- Order: Asterales
- Family: Asteraceae
- Subfamily: Asteroideae
- Tribe: Astereae
- Subtribe: Homochrominae
- Genus: Nolletia; Cass.

Synonyms
- Nolettia Cass., alternate spelling

= Nolletia =

Genus of flowering plants

Nolletia is a genus of flowering plants in the tribe Astereae within the family Asteraceae. The genus was named in honour of Jean-Antoine Nollet, French clergyman and physicist.

Species

- Nolletia arenosa O.Hoffm.
- Nolletia chrysocomoides (Desf.) Cass.
- Nolletia ciliaris (DC.) Steetz
- Nolletia ericoides Merxm.
- Nolletia gariepina (DC.) Mattf.
- Nolletia rarifolia (Turcz.) Steetz
- Nolletia ruderalis Hilliard
- Nolletia tenuifolia Mattf.
- Nolletia zambesica R.E.Fr.

formerly included

see Nicolasia

- Nolletia costata Klatt - Nicolasia costata (Klatt) Thell.
