= Triplocephalum =

Scientific classification
- Kingdom: Plantae
- Clade: Tracheophytes
- Clade: Angiosperms
- Clade: Eudicots
- Clade: Asterids
- Order: Asterales
- Family: Asteraceae
- Subfamily: Asteroideae
- Tribe: Inuleae
- Genus: Triplocephalum; O.Hoffm.
- Species: T. holstii

Binomial name
- Triplocephalum holstii O.Hoffm.

Genus of flowering plants

Triplocephalum is a genus of flowering plants in the tribe Inuleae within the family Asteraceae.

Species

The only known species is Triplocephalum holstii, native to Tanzania.

formerly included

see Geigeria

- Triplocephalum glabrifolium - Geigeria pectidea
