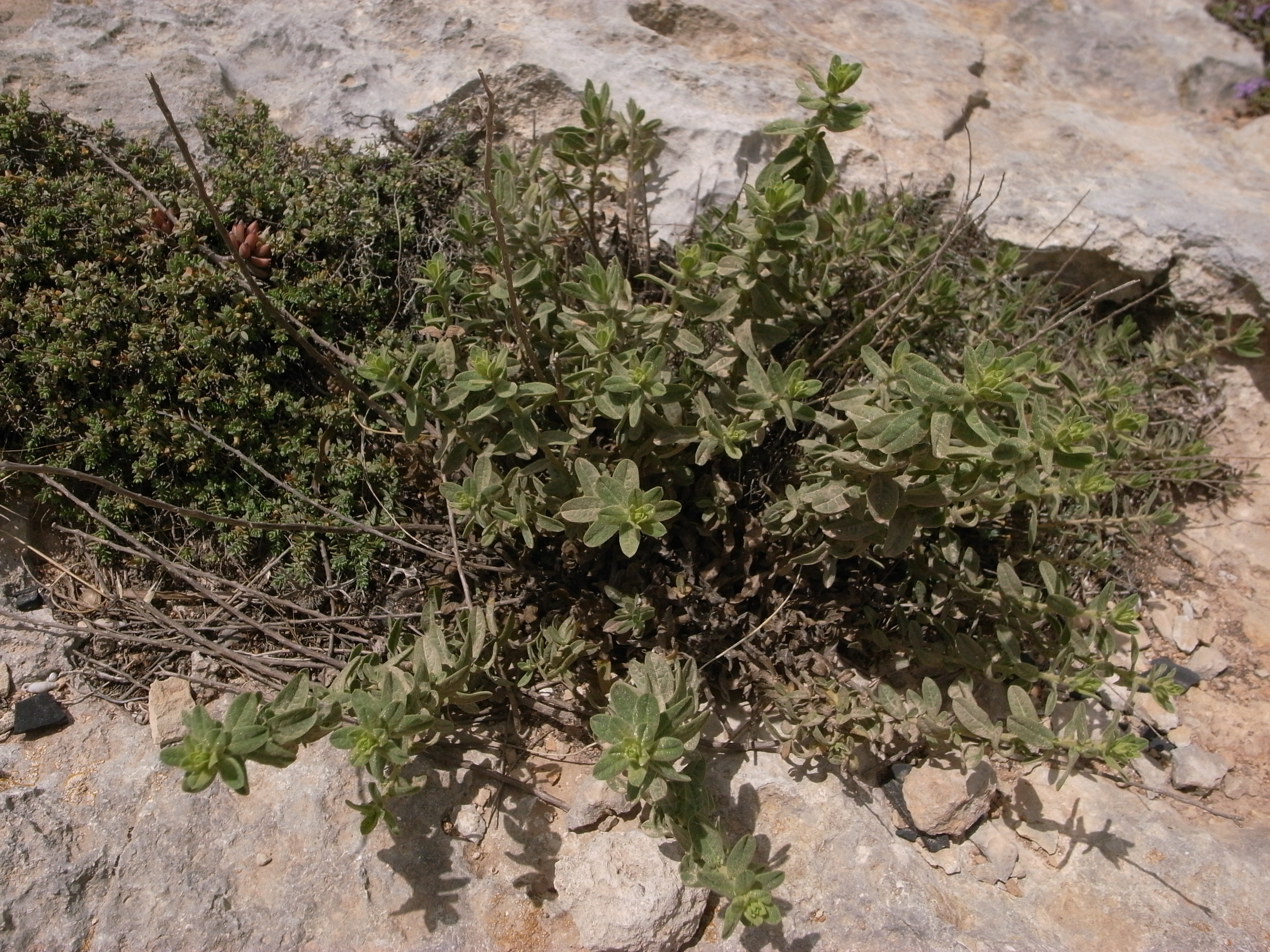
- Chiliadenus bocconei

Scientific classification
- Kingdom: Plantae
- Clade: Tracheophytes
- Clade: Angiosperms
- Clade: Eudicots
- Clade: Asterids
- Order: Asterales
- Family: Asteraceae
- Subfamily: Asteroideae
- Tribe: Inuleae
- Genus: Chiliadenus; Cass.

Type species
- Chiliadenus camphoratus Cass.

Synonyms
- Myriadenus Cass. 1817 illegitimate homonym not Desv. 1813 (Fabaceae)

= Chiliadenus =

Genus of flowering plants

Chiliadenus is a genus of flowering plants in the family Asteraceae.

Species

- Chiliadenus antiatlanticus (Emb. & Maire) Gómiz - Morocco
- Chiliadenus bocconei Brullo - Malta
- Chiliadenus candicans (Delile) Brullo - Libya, Egypt, Israel/Palestine, Jordan
- Chiliadenus glutinosus (L.) Fourr. - Spain, Balearic Islands, Gibraltar, Andorra
- Chiliadenus hesperius (Maire & Wilczek) Brullo - Morocco
- Chiliadenus iphionoides Brullo - Egypt, Israel/Palestine, Jordan, Syria, Lebanon
- Chiliadenus lopadusanus Brullo - Sicily
- Chiliadenus montanus (Vahl) Brullo - Egypt, Israel/Palestine, Jordan, Saudi Arabia
- Chiliadenus rupestris (Pomel) Brullo - Libya, Algeria, Morocco
- Chiliadenus sericeus (Batt. & Trab.) Brullo - Libya, Algeria
