= Iphionopsis =

Scientific classification
- Kingdom: Plantae
- Clade: Tracheophytes
- Clade: Angiosperms
- Clade: Eudicots
- Clade: Asterids
- Order: Asterales
- Family: Asteraceae
- Subfamily: Asteroideae
- Tribe: Inuleae
- Genus: Iphionopsis; A.Anderberg

Type species
- Iphionopsis rotundifolia (Oliv. & Hiern.) A.Anderberg

Genus of flowering plants

Iphionopsis is a genus of African flowering plants in the daisy family.

Species

- Iphionopsis ilicifolia (Humbert) Anderb. - Madagascar
- Iphionopsis oblanceolata N.Kilian - Somalia
- Iphionopsis rotundifolia (Oliv. & Hiern) Anderb. - Somalia
