= Antiphiona =

Scientific classification
- Kingdom: Plantae
- Clade: Embryophytes
- Clade: Tracheophytes
- Clade: Angiosperms
- Clade: Eudicots
- Clade: Asterids
- Order: Asterales
- Family: Asteraceae
- Tribe: Inuleae
- Subtribe: Plucheinae
- Genus: Antiphiona; Merxm.

Type species
- Antiphiona pinnatisecta (S.M.Moore) Merxm.

Genus of flowering plants

Antiphiona is a genus of flowering plants in the daisy family.

Species

Both known species are endemic to Namibia.

- Antiphiona fragrans (Merxm.) Merxm.
- Antiphiona pinnatisecta (S.Moore) Merxm.
