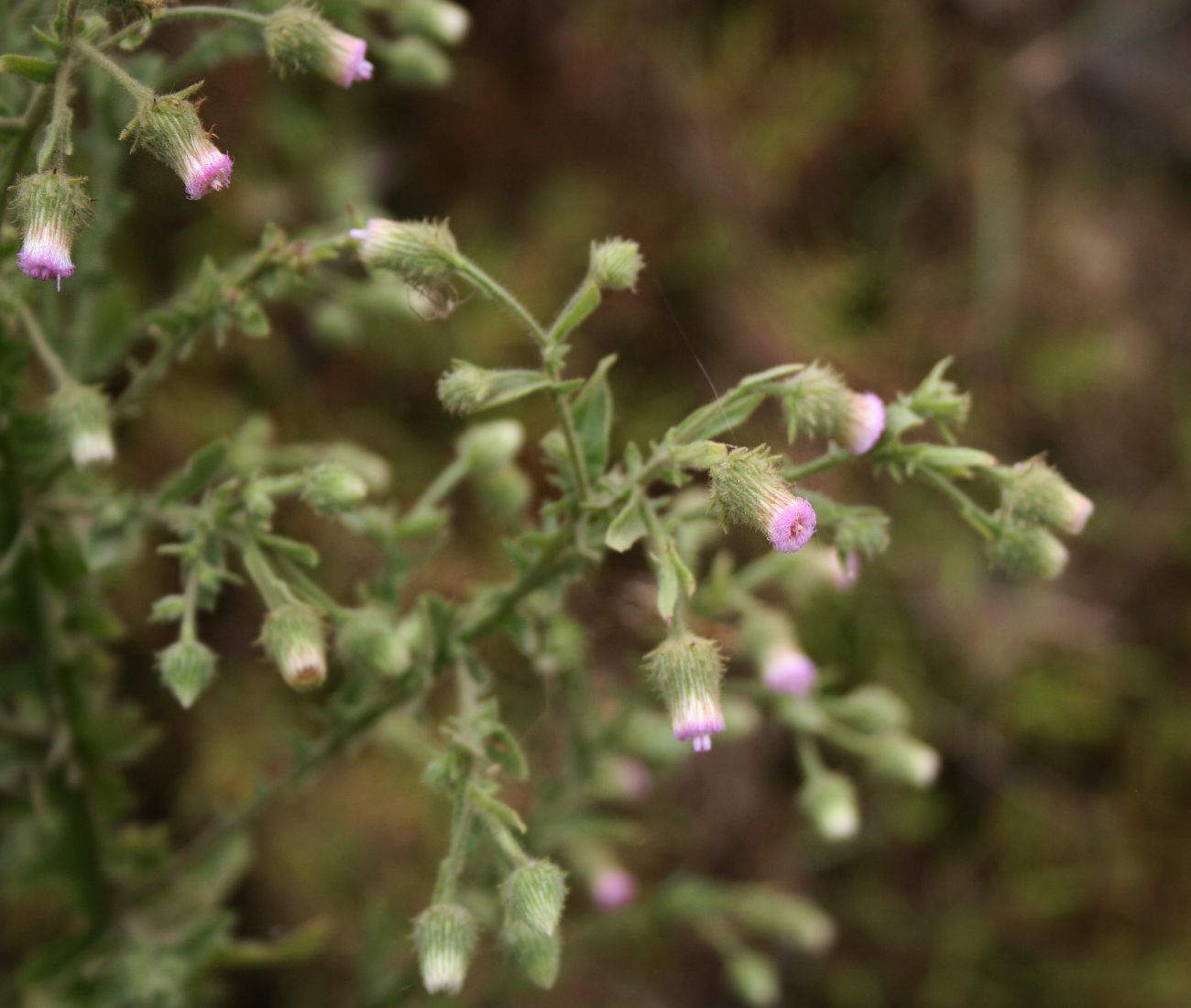
- Laggera crispata

Scientific classification
- Kingdom: Plantae
- Clade: Tracheophytes
- Clade: Angiosperms
- Clade: Eudicots
- Clade: Asterids
- Order: Asterales
- Family: Asteraceae
- Subfamily: Asteroideae
- Tribe: Inuleae
- Genus: Laggera; Sch.Bip. ex Benth.

= Laggera =

Genus of flowering plants

Laggera is a genus of flowering plants in the daisy family.
