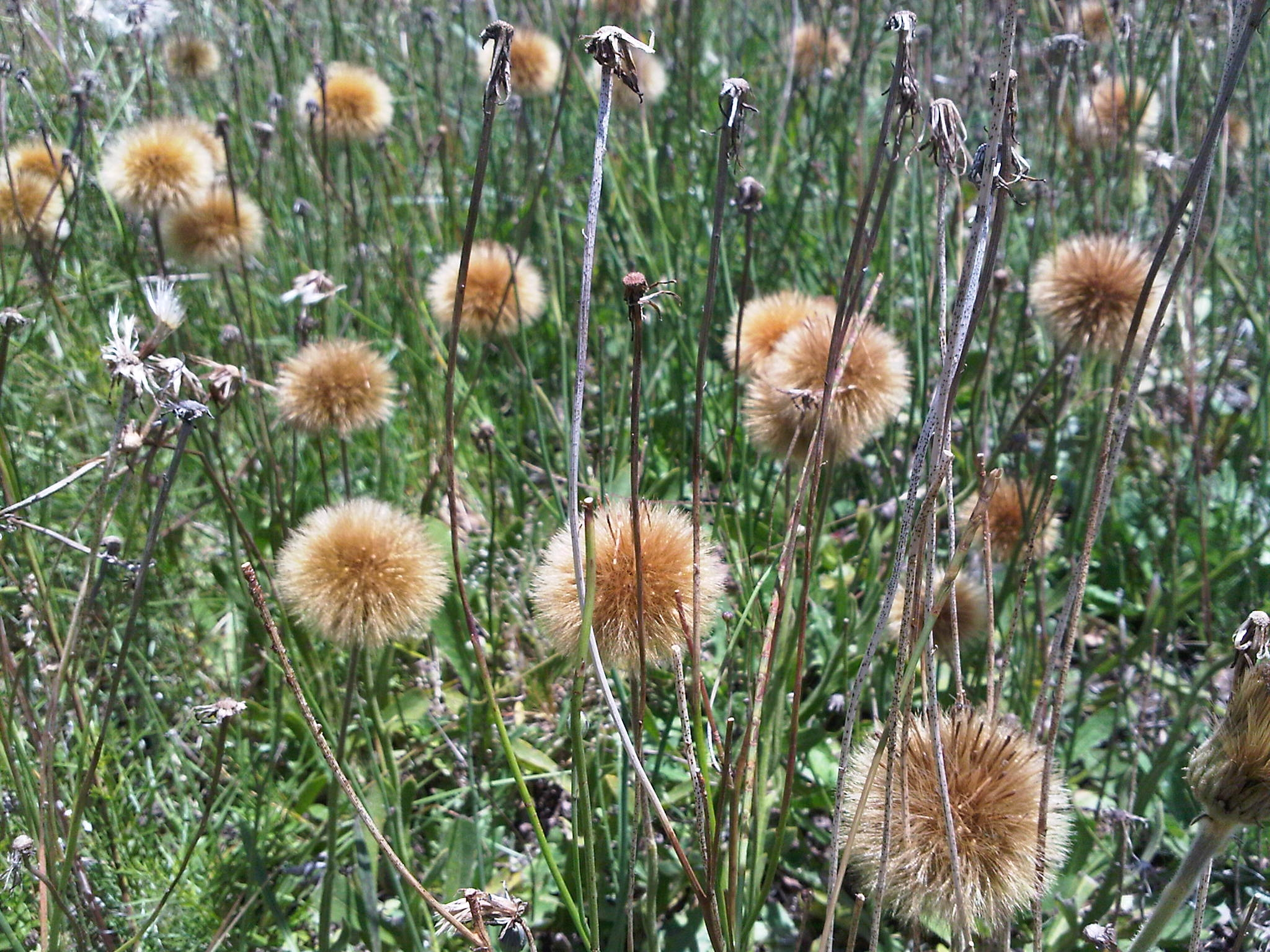
- Stenachaenium campestre

Scientific classification
- Kingdom: Plantae
- Clade: Tracheophytes
- Clade: Angiosperms
- Clade: Eudicots
- Clade: Asterids
- Order: Asterales
- Family: Asteraceae
- Subfamily: Asteroideae
- Tribe: Inuleae
- Genus: Stenachaenium; Benth.

Type species
- Stenachaenium megapotamicum (Spreng.) Baker

= Stenachaenium =

Genus of plants

Stenachaenium is a genus of South American plants in the family Asteraceae.

Species

- Stenachaenium adenanthum (Sch.Bip. ex Krasch.) Krasch. - Brazil (Paraná, Rio Grande do Sul, Santa Catarina, São Paulo)
- Stenachaenium campestre Baker - Brazil (Paraná, Rio Grande do Sul, Santa Catarina), Argentina (Misiones, Corrientes, Entre Ríos), Paraguay (Guairá), Uruguay (Cerro Largo, Montevideo, Colonia, San José, Soriano)
- Stenachaenium macrocephalum Benth. ex Benth. & Hook.f. - Brazil (Paraná, Rio Grande do Sul)
- Stenachaenium megapotamicum (Spreng.) Baker - Brazil (Rio Grande do Sul, Santa Catarina)
- Stenachaenium riedelii Baker - Brazil (Paraná, Rio Grande do Sul, Santa Catarina, São Paulo)
