= Amblyocarpum =

Scientific classification
- Kingdom: Plantae
- Clade: Embryophytes
- Clade: Tracheophytes
- Clade: Angiosperms
- Clade: Eudicots
- Clade: Asterids
- Order: Asterales
- Family: Asteraceae
- Subfamily: Asteroideae
- Tribe: Inuleae
- Genus: Amblyocarpum; Fisch. & C.A. Mey.
- Species: A. inuloides

Binomial name
- Amblyocarpum inuloides Fisch. & C.A. Mey.

Genus of plants

Amblyocarpum is a genus of flowering plants in the daisy family described as a genus in 1837.

There is only one known species, Amblyocarpum inuloides, native to Dagestan in the North Caucasus, Azerbaijan, and Iran.
