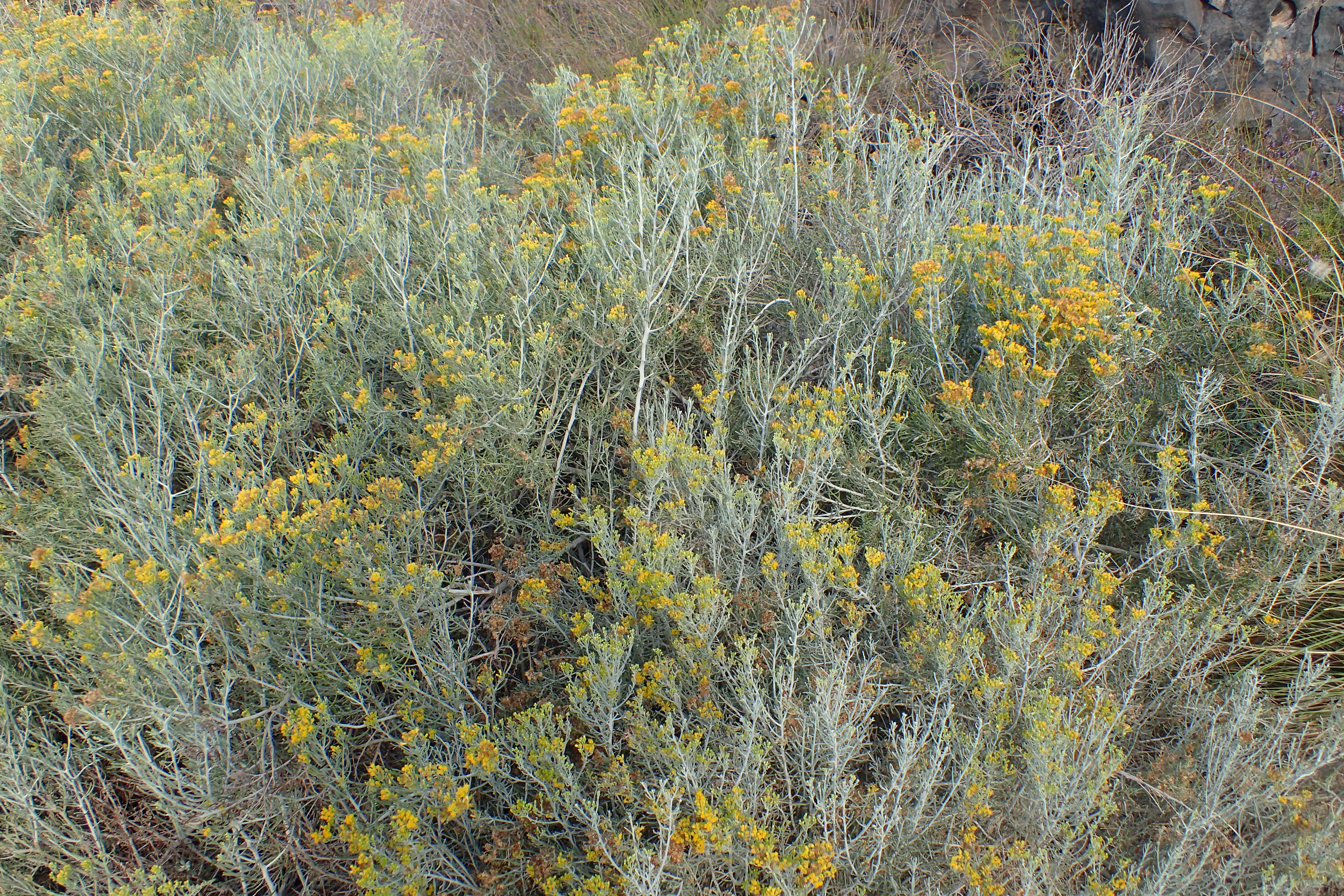
- In habitat in Tenerife

Scientific classification
- Kingdom: Plantae
- Clade: Tracheophytes
- Clade: Angiosperms
- Clade: Eudicots
- Clade: Asterids
- Order: Asterales
- Family: Asteraceae
- Genus: Schizogyne
- Species: S. sericea

Binomial name
- Schizogyne sericea (L.f.) DC.

= Schizogyne sericea =

Species of flowering plant

Schizogyne sericea is a species of flowering plant in the family Asteraceae. It is native to Madeira and the Canary Islands.

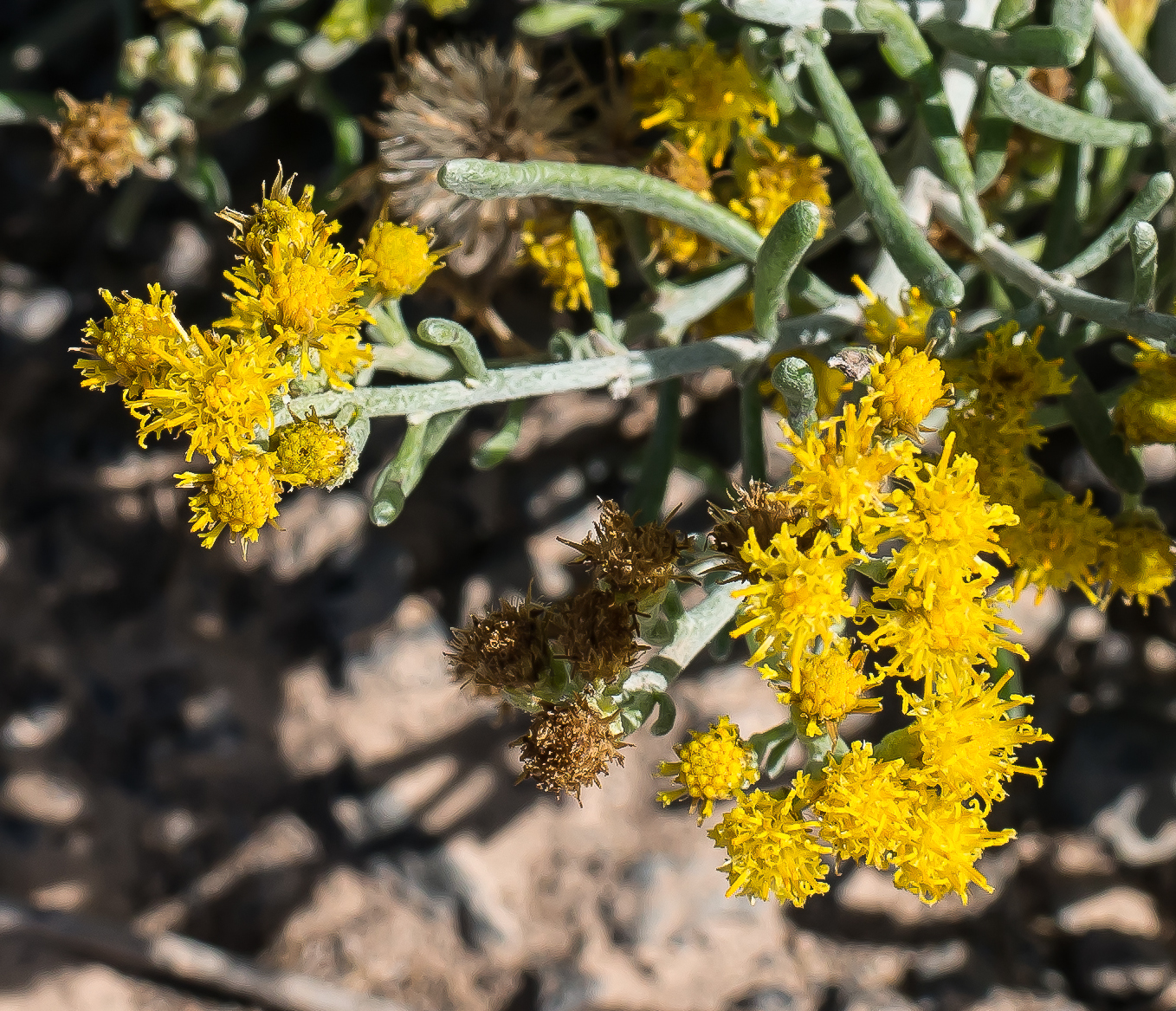
Flower heads
