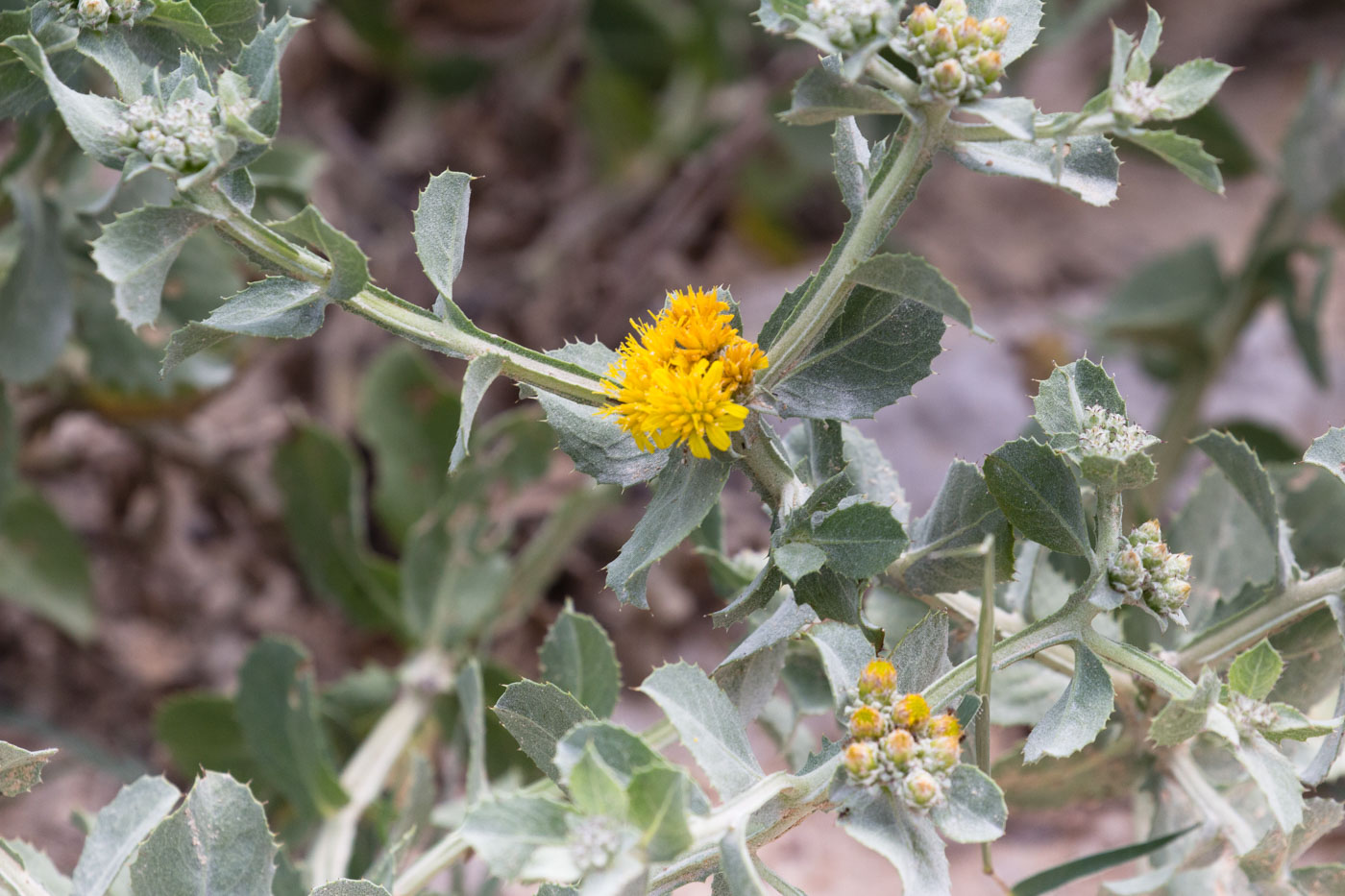
- Calostephane divaricata

Scientific classification
- Kingdom: Plantae
- Clade: Tracheophytes
- Clade: Angiosperms
- Clade: Eudicots
- Clade: Asterids
- Order: Asterales
- Family: Asteraceae
- Tribe: Inuleae
- Subtribe: Plucheinae
- Genus: Calostephane; Benth.

Type species
- Calostephane divaricata Benth.

Synonyms
- Mollera O.Hoffm.

= Calostephane =

Genus of flowering plants

Calostephane is a genus of flowering plants in the aster family, Asteraceae.

It is distributed in tropical southern Africa and Madagascar.

These are annual herbs. The alternately arranged, toothed leaves are decurrent, the bases wrapping the stem to form wings. The flower heads are solitary or borne in loose panicle inflorescences. The heads contain yellow disc florets, and some species have yellow ray florets. The fruit has a pappus with an outer row of wide, membranous scales and an inner row of longer, narrower scales.

Species

- Calostephane angolensis - Angola
- Calostephane divaricata - Mozambique, Eswatini, Botswana, Limpopo, KwaZulu-Natal
- Calostephane huillensis - Angola
- Calostephane madagascariensis - Madagascar
- Calostephane marlothiana - Namibia
- Calostephane punctulata - Angola
