= Monarrhenus pinifolius =

Scientific classification
- Kingdom: Plantae
- Clade: Tracheophytes
- Clade: Angiosperms
- Clade: Eudicots
- Clade: Asterids
- Order: Asterales
- Family: Asteraceae
- Genus: Monarrhenus
- Species: M. pinifolius

Binomial name
- Monarrhenus pinifolius Cass.

Species of flowering plant

Monarrhenus pinifolius is a species of plant in the sunflower family. It is endemic to Réunion.
