= Coleocoma =

Scientific classification
- Kingdom: Plantae
- Clade: Tracheophytes
- Clade: Angiosperms
- Clade: Eudicots
- Clade: Asterids
- Order: Asterales
- Family: Asteraceae
- Subfamily: Asteroideae
- Tribe: Inuleae
- Subtribe: Plucheinae
- Genus: Coleocoma; F.Muell.
- Species: C. centaurea

Binomial name
- Coleocoma centaurea F.Muell.

Genus of flowering plants

Coleocoma is a genus of flowering plants in the family Asteraceae.

There is only one known species, Coleocoma centaurea, native to Western Australia and the adjacent Northern Territory.
