= Feddea =

Scientific classification
- Kingdom: Plantae
- Clade: Tracheophytes
- Clade: Angiosperms
- Clade: Eudicots
- Clade: Asterids
- Order: Asterales
- Family: Asteraceae
- Subfamily: Asteroideae
- Tribe: Inuleae
- Genus: Feddea; Urb.
- Species: F. cubensis

Binomial name
- Feddea cubensis Urb.

Genus of plant

Feddea is a monotypic genus of flowering plants in the family Asteraceae. The only species is Feddea cubensis, endemic to Cuba.
