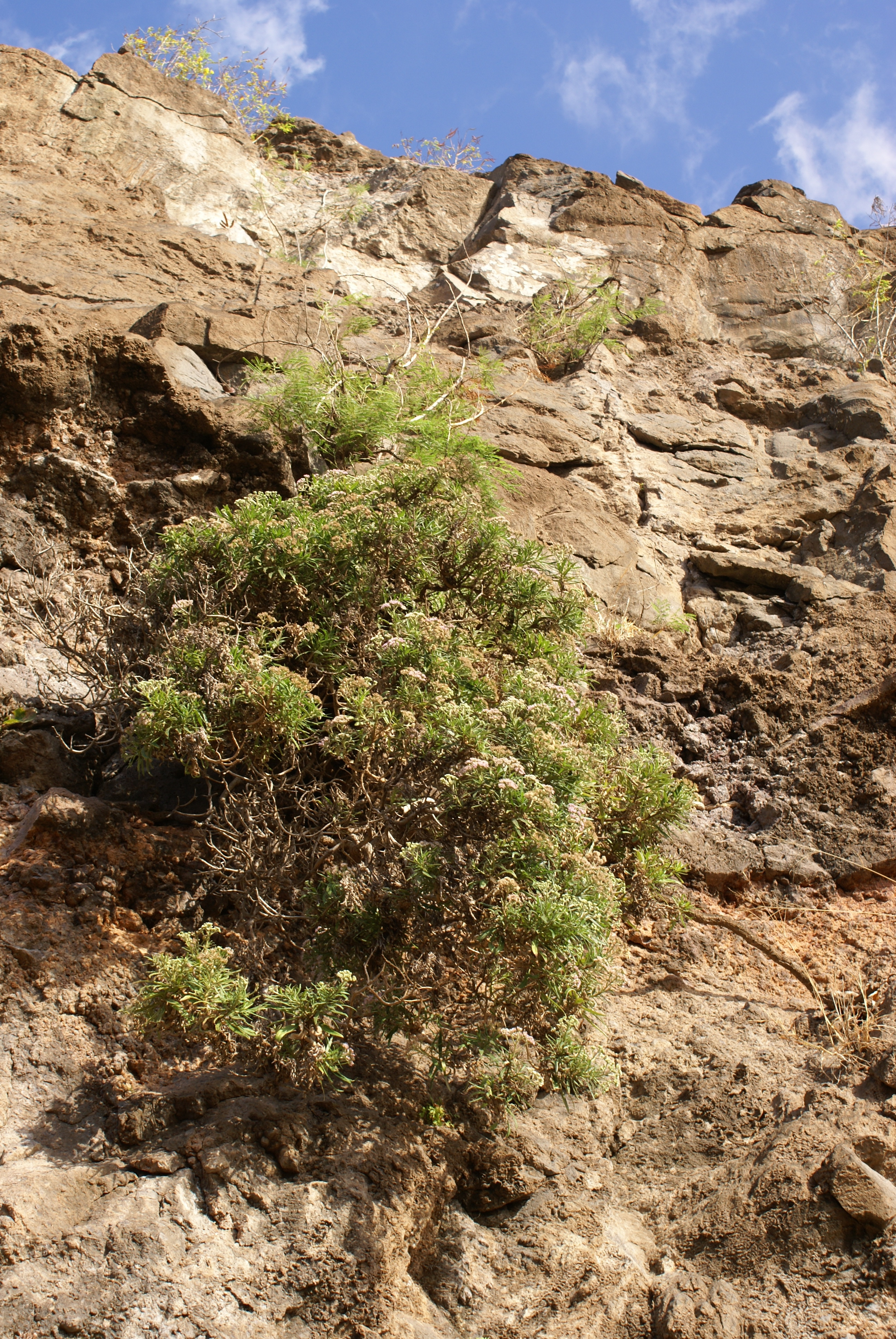
- Monarrhenis salicifolius

Scientific classification
- Kingdom: Plantae
- Clade: Tracheophytes
- Clade: Angiosperms
- Clade: Eudicots
- Clade: Asterids
- Order: Asterales
- Family: Asteraceae
- Subfamily: Asteroideae
- Tribe: Inuleae
- Genus: Monarrhenus; Cass.

= Monarrhenus =

Genus of flowering plants

Monarrhenus is a genus of plants in the sunflower family.

Species include:

- Monarrhenus pinifolius Cass.
- Monarrhenus salicifolius Cass.
