= Pegolettia =

Scientific classification
- Kingdom: Plantae
- Clade: Tracheophytes
- Clade: Angiosperms
- Clade: Eudicots
- Clade: Asterids
- Order: Asterales
- Family: Asteraceae
- Subfamily: Asteroideae
- Tribe: Inuleae
- Genus: Pegolettia; Cass.

Type species
- Pegolettia senegalensis Cass.

Genus of flowering plants

Pegolettia is a genus of African plants in the tribe Inuleae within the family Asteraceae.

Species

- Pegolettia baccharidifolia Less.
- Pegolettia gariepina Anderb.
- Pegolettia lanceolata Harv.
- Pegolettia oxyodonta DC.
- Pegolettia pinnatilobata (Klatt) O.Hoffm. ex Dinter
- Pegolettia plumosa M.D.Hend.
- Pegolettia retrofracta (Thunb.) Kies
- Pegolettia senegalensis Cass.
- Pegolettia tenuifolia Bolus
