= Pseudoblepharispermum =

Scientific classification
- Kingdom: Plantae
- Clade: Embryophytes
- Clade: Tracheophytes
- Clade: Angiosperms
- Clade: Eudicots
- Clade: Asterids
- Order: Asterales
- Family: Asteraceae
- Subfamily: Asteroideae
- Tribe: Inuleae
- Genus: Pseudoblepharispermum; J.-P.Lebrun & A.L.Stork

Type species
- Pseudoblepharispermum bremeri J.-P.Lebrun & A.L.Stork

Genus of plants native to East Africa

Pseudoblepharispermum is a genus of flowering plants in the daisy family, native to East Africa.

Species

- Pseudoblepharispermum bremeri J.-P.Lebrun & Stork - Ethiopia
- Pseudoblepharispermum mudugense Beentje & D.J.N.Hind - Somalia
