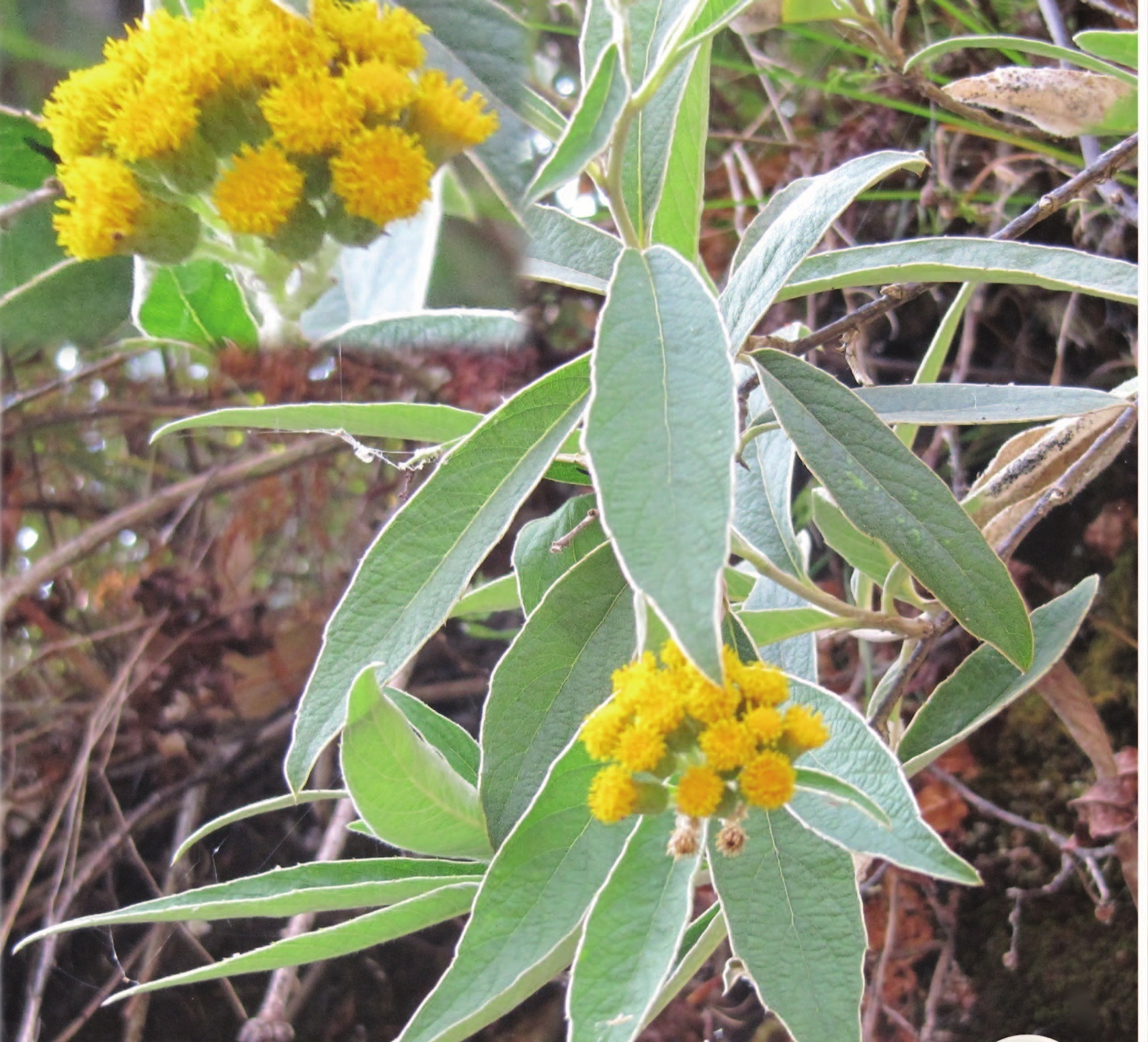
- Duhaldea cappa

Scientific classification
- Kingdom: Plantae
- Clade: Tracheophytes
- Clade: Angiosperms
- Clade: Eudicots
- Clade: Asterids
- Order: Asterales
- Family: Asteraceae
- Subfamily: Asteroideae
- Tribe: Inuleae
- Genus: Duhaldea; DC.

Type species
- Duhaldea chinensis DC.

Synonyms
- Amphirhapis DC.

= Duhaldea =

Genus of flowering plants

Duhaldea is a genus of Asian flowering plants in the daisy family.

Species

- Duhaldea cappa (Buch.-Ham. ex D.Don) Pruski & Anderb.
- Duhaldea cuspidata (DC.) Anderb.
- Duhaldea eupatorioides (DC.) Anderb.
- Duhaldea forrestii (J.Anthony) Anderb.
- Duhaldea griffithii (C.B.Clarke) Anderb.
- Duhaldea latifolia (DC.) R.Dawar & Qaiser
- Duhaldea nervosa (Wall. ex DC.) Anderb.
- Duhaldea pterocaula (Franch.) Anderb.
- Duhaldea revoluta Anderb.
- Duhaldea rubricaulis (Wall. ex DC.) Anderb.
- Duhaldea simonsii (C.B.Clarke) Anderb.
- Duhaldea wissmanniana (Hand.-Mazz.) Anderb.
