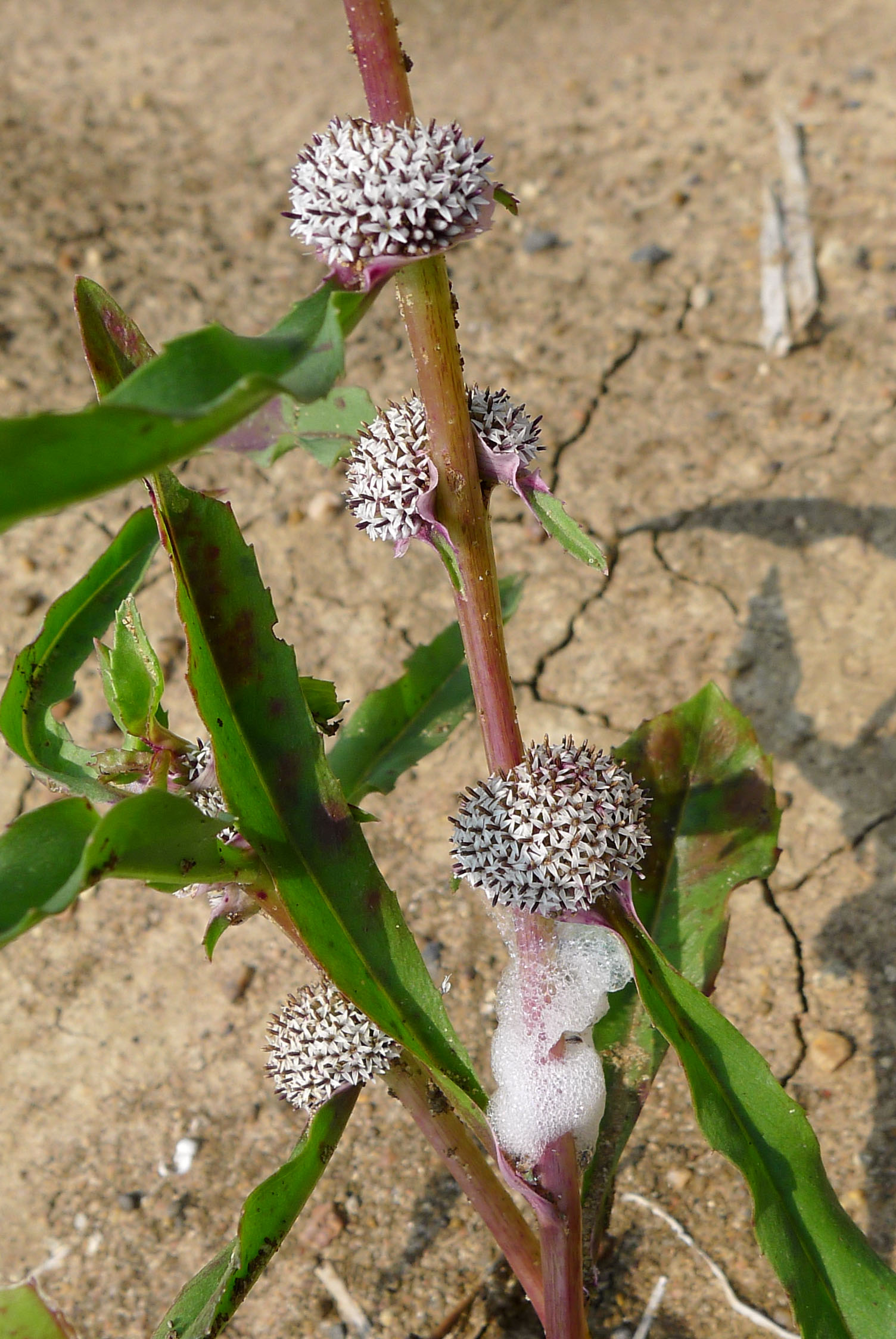

Conservation status
- Least Concern (IUCN 3.1)

Scientific classification
- Kingdom: Plantae
- Clade: Tracheophytes
- Clade: Angiosperms
- Clade: Eudicots
- Clade: Asterids
- Order: Asterales
- Family: Asteraceae
- Subfamily: Asteroideae
- Tribe: Inuleae
- Genus: Caesulia; Roxb.
- Species: C. axillaris

Binomial name
- Caesulia axillaris Roxb.

= Caesulia =

Genus of flowering plants

Caesulia is a monotypic genus of flowering plants in the aster family, Asteraceae, containing the single species Caesulia axillaris. Its common name is pink node flower. It is native to Bangladesh, Burma, India, Nepal, and Sri Lanka.

This plant grows in wet and aquatic habitat, such as marshes, wet meadows, and irrigation ditches. It may grow on wet land or float in water bodies. It grows in rice paddies in some areas, but it is usually not weedy.
