= Rhanteriopsis =

Scientific classification
- Kingdom: Plantae
- Clade: Embryophytes
- Clade: Tracheophytes
- Clade: Angiosperms
- Clade: Eudicots
- Clade: Asterids
- Order: Asterales
- Family: Asteraceae
- Subfamily: Asteroideae
- Tribe: Inuleae
- Genus: Rhanteriopsis; Rauschert

Type species
- Rhanteriopsis lanuginosa (DC.) Rauschert

Synonyms
- Takhtajanianthus A.B.De; Postia Boiss. & Blanche 1875, illegitimate homonym not Fr. 1874 (a fungus in Polyporaceae)

Genus of plants

Rhanteriopsis is a genus of Middle Eastern plants in the tribe Inuleae within the family Asteraceae.

Species

- Rhanteriopsis bombycina (Boiss. & Hausskn.) Rauschert - Iran
- Rhanteriopsis lanuginosa (DC.) Rauschert - Syria, Lebanon
- Rhanteriopsis microcephala (Boiss.) Rauschert - Syria, Lebanon
- Rhanteriopsis puberula (Boiss. & Hausskn.) Rauschert - Iran
