= Ighermia =

Scientific classification
- Kingdom: Plantae
- Clade: Tracheophytes
- Clade: Angiosperms
- Clade: Eudicots
- Clade: Asterids
- Order: Asterales
- Family: Asteraceae
- Subfamily: Asteroideae
- Tribe: Inuleae
- Genus: Ighermia; Wiklund
- Species: I. pinifolia

Binomial name
- Ighermia pinifolia (Maire & Wilczek) Wiklund

Genus of flowering plants

Ighermia was a monotypic genus of flowering plants in the family Asteraceae. It had only one species, Ighermia pinifolia. It was first published in Nordic J. Bot. Vol.3 on page 445 in 1983.

The genus name of Ighermia is derived from "Ighermi", a Berber name of this plant.

This is now classed as a synonym of Asteriscus.
