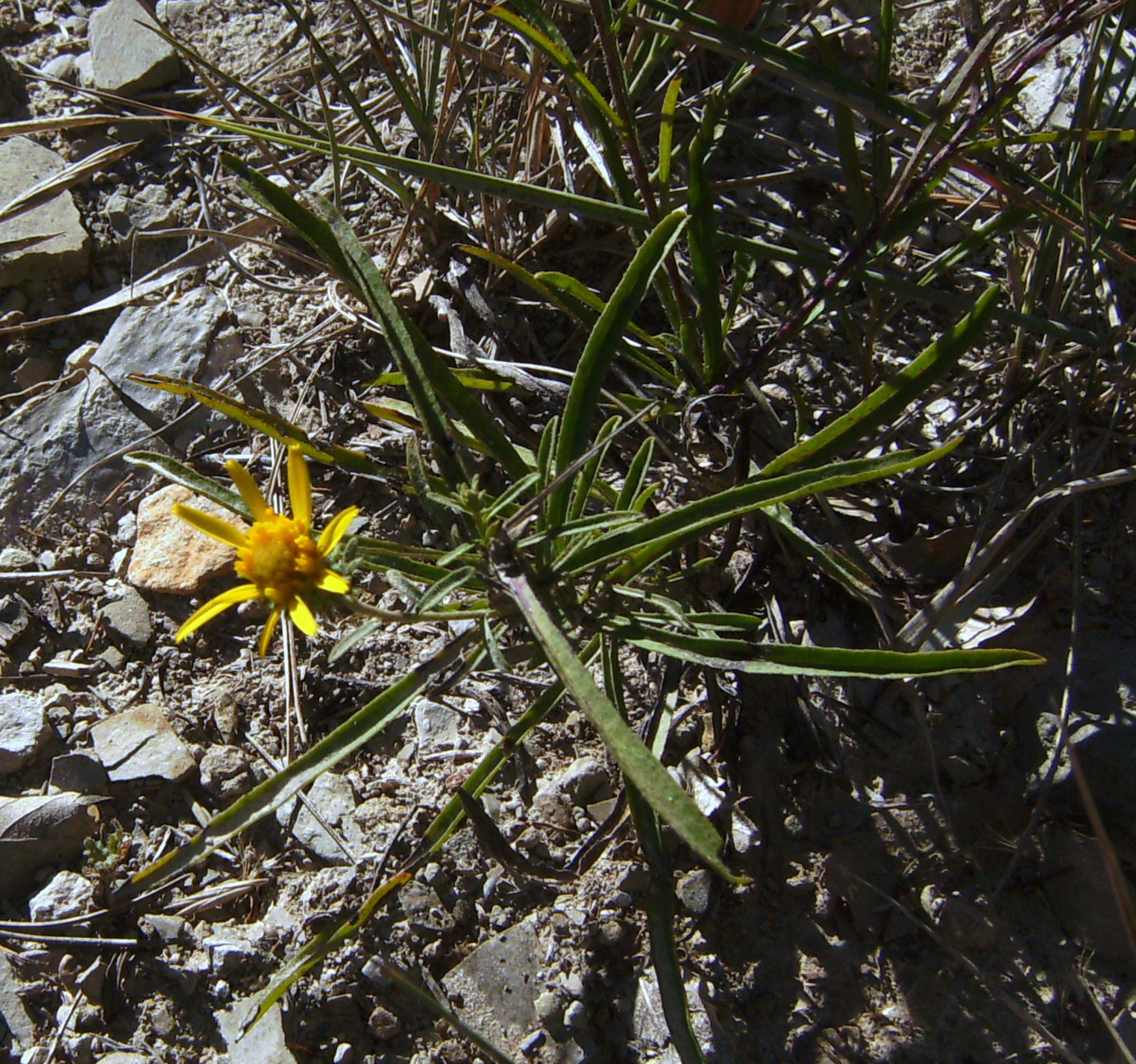
- Jasonia tuberosa

Scientific classification
- Kingdom: Plantae
- Clade: Embryophytes
- Clade: Tracheophytes
- Clade: Angiosperms
- Clade: Eudicots
- Clade: Asterids
- Order: Asterales
- Family: Asteraceae
- Subfamily: Asteroideae
- Tribe: Inuleae
- Genus: Jasonia; Cass.

Type species
- Jasonia tuberosa (L.) DC.

= Jasonia =

Genus of flowering plants

Jasonia is a genus of flowering plants in the family Asteraceae.

Species

- Jasonia longifolia Cass.
- Jasonia radiata Cass.
- Jasonia tuberosa (L.) DC. - France, Spain, Portugal
