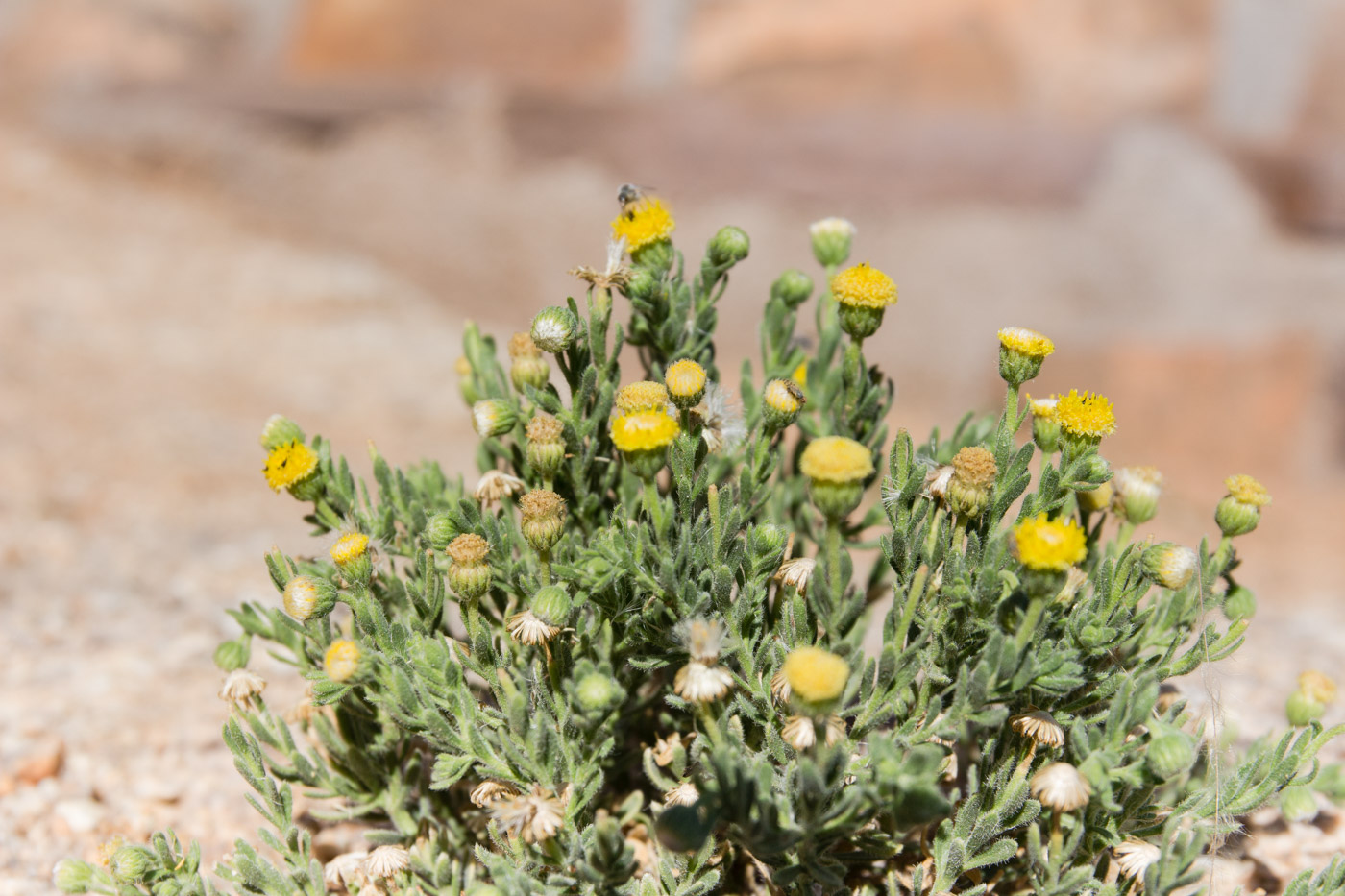

Scientific classification
- Kingdom: Plantae
- Clade: Tracheophytes
- Clade: Angiosperms
- Clade: Eudicots
- Clade: Asterids
- Order: Asterales
- Family: Asteraceae
- Genus: Nolletia
- Species: N. gariepina

Binomial name
- Nolletia gariepina (DC.) Mattf.

Synonyms
- Felicia gariepina (DC.) L.Bolus; Nidorella gariepina DC.

= Nolletia gariepina =

Species of plant from southern Africa

Nolletia gariepina, the desert beesbossie, is a species of plant from southern Africa.

== Description ==
This shrub grows up to 60 cm (2.0 ft) tall. The older branches are often reddish while the younger branches are yellow. The plant is densely covered with spreading hairs, interspersed with loosely arranged glands. The leaves have a loose alternate arrangement and range from linear to oblong in shape.

Flowers are present between August and November. They may, however, be present year-round and are also common between March and May. The yellow disc shaped flower heads are solitarily arranged on the ends of branches. The disc (outer) florets are sometimes purplish in the upper part. The pappus (a modified calyx) is made of barbed bristles. The hairy stems holding the flowers are surrounded by three to four rows of green bracts. They are sometimes tinged purple and often have yellow or orange air sacs along the midline.

The seeds are brown with a thickened whitish margin. They are egg shaped and laterally flattened.

== Distribution and habitat ==
This species is found growing between central Namibia and the Northern Cape of South Africa. It grows on rocky and sandy uplands and is most commonly found growing amongst granite boulders.

== Conservation ==
This species is considered to be of least concern by the South African National Biodiversity Institute. It is widespread and the population is stable.

== Toxicity ==
This plant contains a water-soluble nephrotoxin (toxin which impacts the kidneys) which has been found to impact cattle. The first outbreaks were observed in the Kalahari in South Africa. Symptoms vary depending on the length of the toxological process but include weakness, malaise, swelling in the perineum, lower chest and abdomen due to fluid buildup and renal cortical pallor. A study showed that cattle are only impacted by ingesting this plant (a dose of 3 gr (0.00043 lb) dry mass per 1 kg (2.2 lb) of animal) if they have not eaten during the previous 24 hours and therefore have an empty rumen.

The toxological impact of this species has also been examined in sheep. Sheep dosed with a 1.5 gr (0.00021 lb) dry mass per 1 kg (2.2 lb) of animal showed no response to the plant while most of those fed 2.8–3 gr (0.00040–0.00043 lb) dry mass per 1 kg (2.2 lb) of animal died.
