= Cratystylis =

Scientific classification
- Kingdom: Plantae
- Clade: Embryophytes
- Clade: Tracheophytes
- Clade: Angiosperms
- Clade: Eudicots
- Clade: Asterids
- Order: Asterales
- Family: Asteraceae
- Tribe: Inuleae
- Subtribe: Plucheinae
- Genus: Cratystylis; S.Moore

Synonyms
- Stera Ewart

Genus of flowering plants

Cratystylis is a genus of Australian flowering plants in the family Asteraceae.

Species

- Cratystylis centralis Albr. & Paul G.Wilson - Western Australia, Northern Territory
- Cratystylis conocephala (F.Muell.) S.Moore - Western Australia, South Australia, Victoria, New South Wales
- Cratystylis microphylla S.Moore - Western Australia
- Cratystylis subspinescens S.Moore - Western Australia
