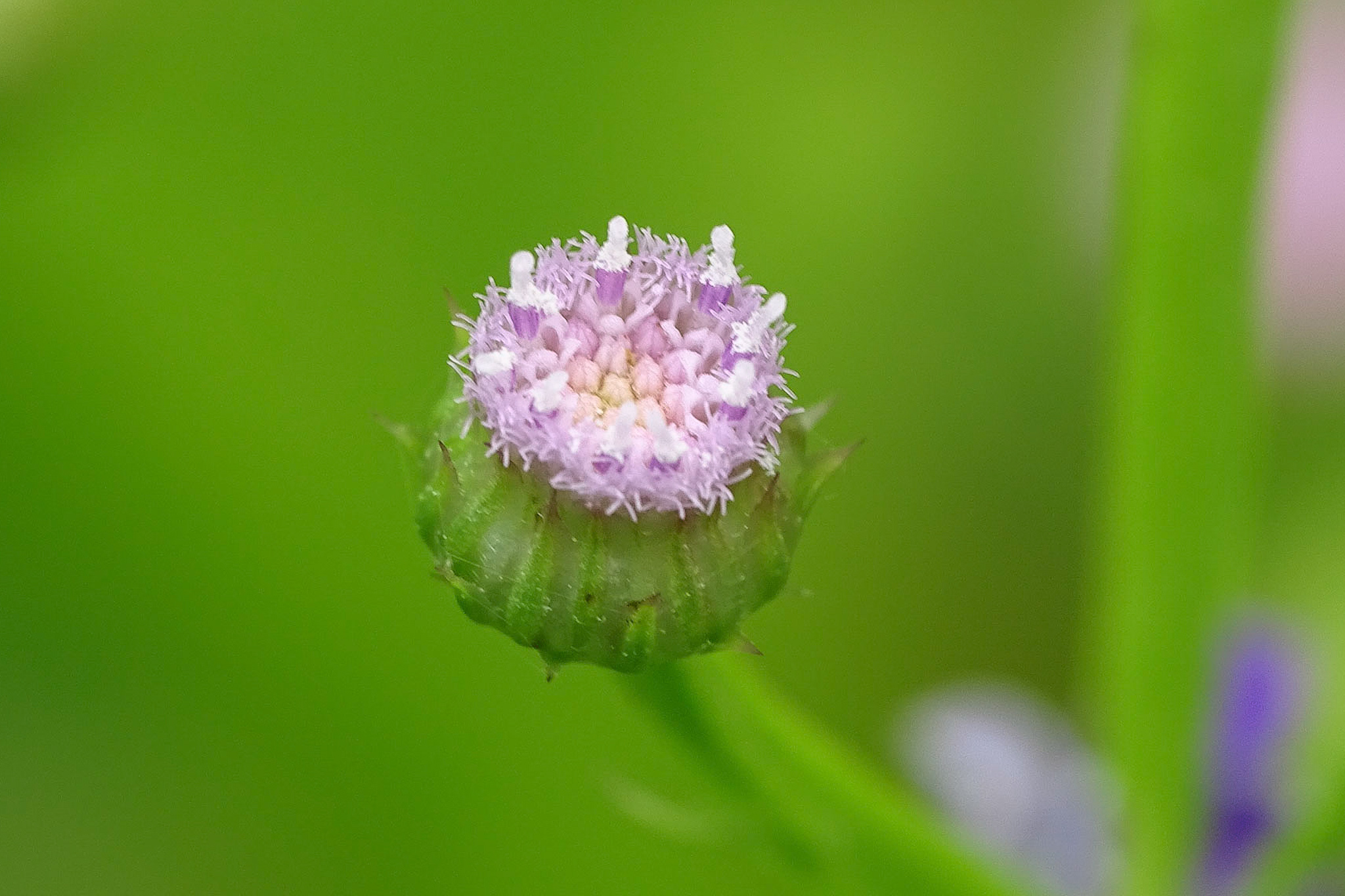
- Epaltes divaricata

Scientific classification
- Kingdom: Plantae
- Clade: Tracheophytes
- Clade: Angiosperms
- Clade: Eudicots
- Clade: Asterids
- Order: Asterales
- Family: Asteraceae
- Subfamily: Asteroideae
- Tribe: Inuleae
- Genus: Epaltes; Cass.

Type species
- Epaltes divaricata (L.) Cass.

Synonyms
- Epalthes Walp.; Erigerodes L. ex Kuntze; Ethuliopsis F.Muell.; Gynaphanes Steetz; Pachythelia Steetz; Poilania Gagnep.

= Epaltes =

Genus of flowering plants

Epaltes is a genus of flowering plants in the daisy family. They are distributed in Australia, the Americas, Asia, and Africa.

These plants are annual or perennial herbs or shrubs with alternately arranged leaves.

== Species ==
The following species are recognised in the genus Epaltes:

- Epaltes brasiliensis (Link) DC. — Lesser Antilles, Brazil.
- Epaltes cunninghamii (Hook.) Benth. — Australia
- Epaltes divaricata (L.) Cass. — India, Sri Lanka, Myanmar, Thailand, Vietnam, China (Hainan), Indonesia (Java)
- Epaltes madagascariensis Humbert — Madagascar
- Epaltes mattfeldii Urb. — Cuba
- Epaltes mexicana Less. — Guatemala, Mexico (Tabasco, Veracruz, Oaxaca, Chiapas, Campeche)
- Epaltes pygmaea DC. — India (Karnataka, Tamil Nadu)
