= Merrittia =

Scientific classification
- Kingdom: Plantae
- Clade: Tracheophytes
- Clade: Angiosperms
- Clade: Eudicots
- Clade: Asterids
- Order: Asterales
- Family: Asteraceae
- Subfamily: Asteroideae
- Tribe: Inuleae
- Genus: Merrittia; Merr.
- Species: M. benguetensis

Binomial name
- Merrittia benguetensis Merr.

Synonyms
- Blumea benguetensis Mattf.; Senecio benguetensis Elmer

Species of flowering plant

Merrittia is a monotypic genus of flowering plants belonging to the family Asteraceae. The only species is Merrittia benguetensis Merr.

It is native to the Philippines.

The genus name of Merrittia is in honour of Melvin Leroy Merritt (1879–1961), an American forester for the Philippine Bureau of Forestry and the US Forest Service. The Latin specific epithet of benguetensis refers to Benguet, a Province of the Philippines. Both genus and species were first described and published in Philipp. J. Sci., C Vol.5 on page 396 in 1910.
