= Thespidium =

Scientific classification
- Kingdom: Plantae
- Clade: Tracheophytes
- Clade: Angiosperms
- Clade: Eudicots
- Clade: Asterids
- Order: Asterales
- Family: Asteraceae
- Subfamily: Asteroideae
- Tribe: Inuleae
- Genus: Thespidium; F.Muell. ex Benth.
- Species: T. basiflorum

Binomial name
- Thespidium basiflorum (F.Muell.) ex Benth.

Synonyms
- Pluchea basiflora F.Muell.

Genus of plants

Thespidium is a genus of Australian plants in the daisy family.

Species

The only known species is Thespidium basiflorum, native to northern Australia (Queensland, Northern Territory, Western Australia).
