= Ondetia =

Scientific classification
- Kingdom: Plantae
- Clade: Tracheophytes
- Clade: Angiosperms
- Clade: Eudicots
- Clade: Asterids
- Order: Asterales
- Family: Asteraceae
- Subfamily: Asteroideae
- Tribe: Inuleae
- Genus: Ondetia; Benth.
- Species: O. linearis

Binomial name
- Ondetia linearis Benth.

Genus of plants

Ondetia is a genus of flowering plants in the tribe Inuleae within the family Asteraceae.

Species

The only known species is Ondetia linearis, native to the Damaraland region of Namibia.
