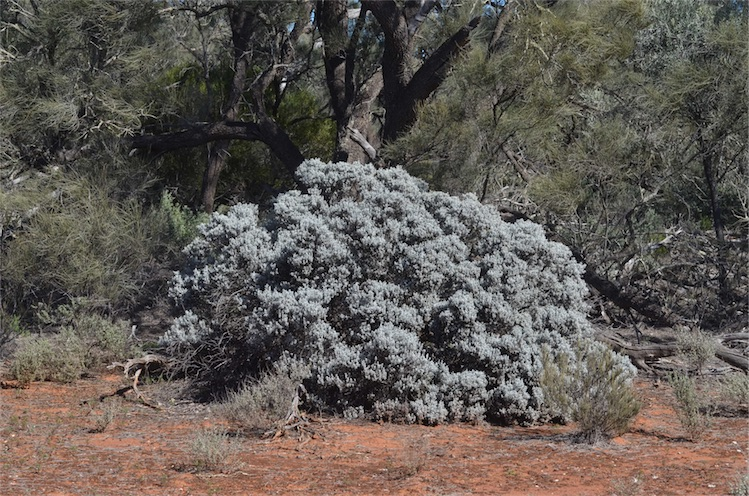
- Cratystylus conocephala in the mallee ecosystem

Scientific classification
- Kingdom: Plantae
- Clade: Tracheophytes
- Clade: Angiosperms
- Clade: Eudicots
- Clade: Asterids
- Order: Asterales
- Family: Asteraceae
- Genus: Cratystylis
- Species: C. conocephala

Binomial name
- Cratystylis conocephala (F.Muell.) S.Moore

Synonyms
- List: Aster conocephalus F.Muell.; Eurybia conocephala F.Muell.; Olearia conocephala (F.Muell.) F.Muell. ex Benth.; Olearia conocephala var. microphylla Diels; Pluchea conocephala (F.Muell.) F.Muell.; Pteronia australiensis Hutch.; Stera conocephala (F.Muell.) Ewart & Rees

= Cratystylis conocephala =

Blue bush daisy

Species of plant in the aster family

Cratystylis conocephala commonly known as the blue bush daisy, blue bush, grey bush, and round leaved greybush, is a species of flowering plant in the family Asteraceae, native to southeast Western Australia, South Australia, New South Wales, and Victoria. It is a densely branched, spreading shrub.The species is listed as endangered in New South Wales and critically endangered in Victoria.

== Description ==
Cratystylis conocephala is a silver to blue-grey shrub, upright to 0.7–1.8 m (2.3–5.9 ft) high. The stems are erect, woody and densely arranged and forms a gnarled trunk. The bark is fibrous, with younger stems covered densely in short, matted, wooly hairs. Leaves are wedge-shaped to oval shaped, 5–8 mm (0.20–0.31 in) long and have a prominent mid-vein and grey and wooly on both sides. Flowerheads are 12–15 mm long and 3–8 mm in diameter and are stalkless. Obtuse involucral bracts are 3–7 mm long, green and sparsely hairy. Florets 4–6; corollas 10-12mm long and white in colour. Flowering occurs from September to December and the fruit is an Achenes 3–4 mm long when not fully developed (abortive) and 6–7 mm when fertile.

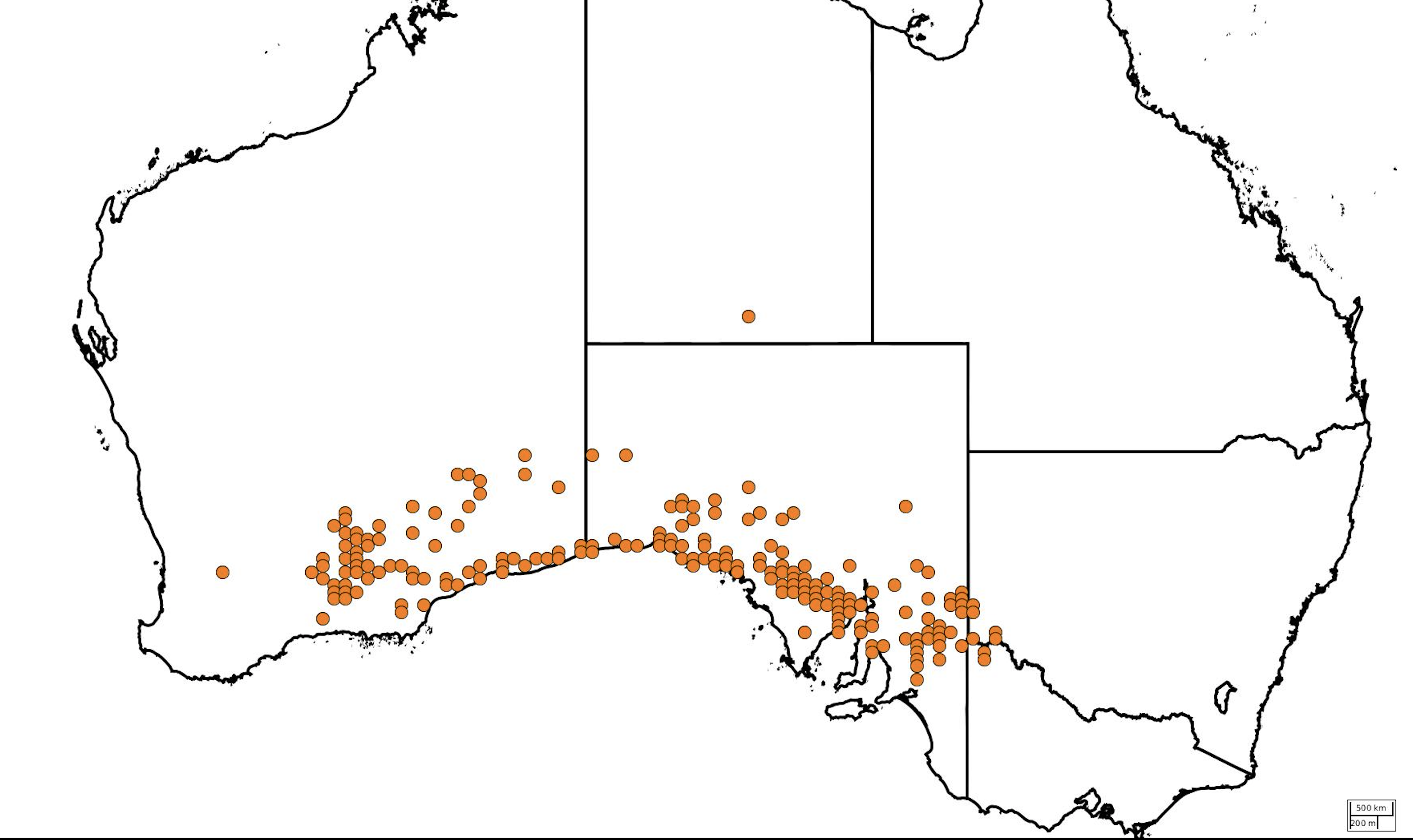
A map depicting where C. conocephala has been recorded

== Taxonomy and naming ==
This species was described in 1855 by Ferdinand von Mueller and given the name Eurybia conocephala. In 1905 Spencer Le Marchant Moore changed the name and the description was published in Journal of Botany, British and Foreign.

== Distribution and habitat ==
This species is found on calcareous red soils and sandy soils in different ecosystem types. These include mallee, coastal scrub and woodland vegetation communities. Blue bush daisy proliferates in ecosystems which have not been exposed to fire for extended periods of time. It grows in the IBRA (Interim Biogeographic Regionalisation for Australia) of Coolgardie, Hampton, Mallee (Victoria), Mallee and Nullarbor. on calcerous red soils and sandy soilsin Western Australia, South Australia, Northern Territory, New South Wales and Victoria. The species is very rare in the Southern Far Western Plains of New South Wales, and Belah Woodlands of North West Victoria. It is found to grow in mallee, coastal scrub and woodland vegetation communities.
