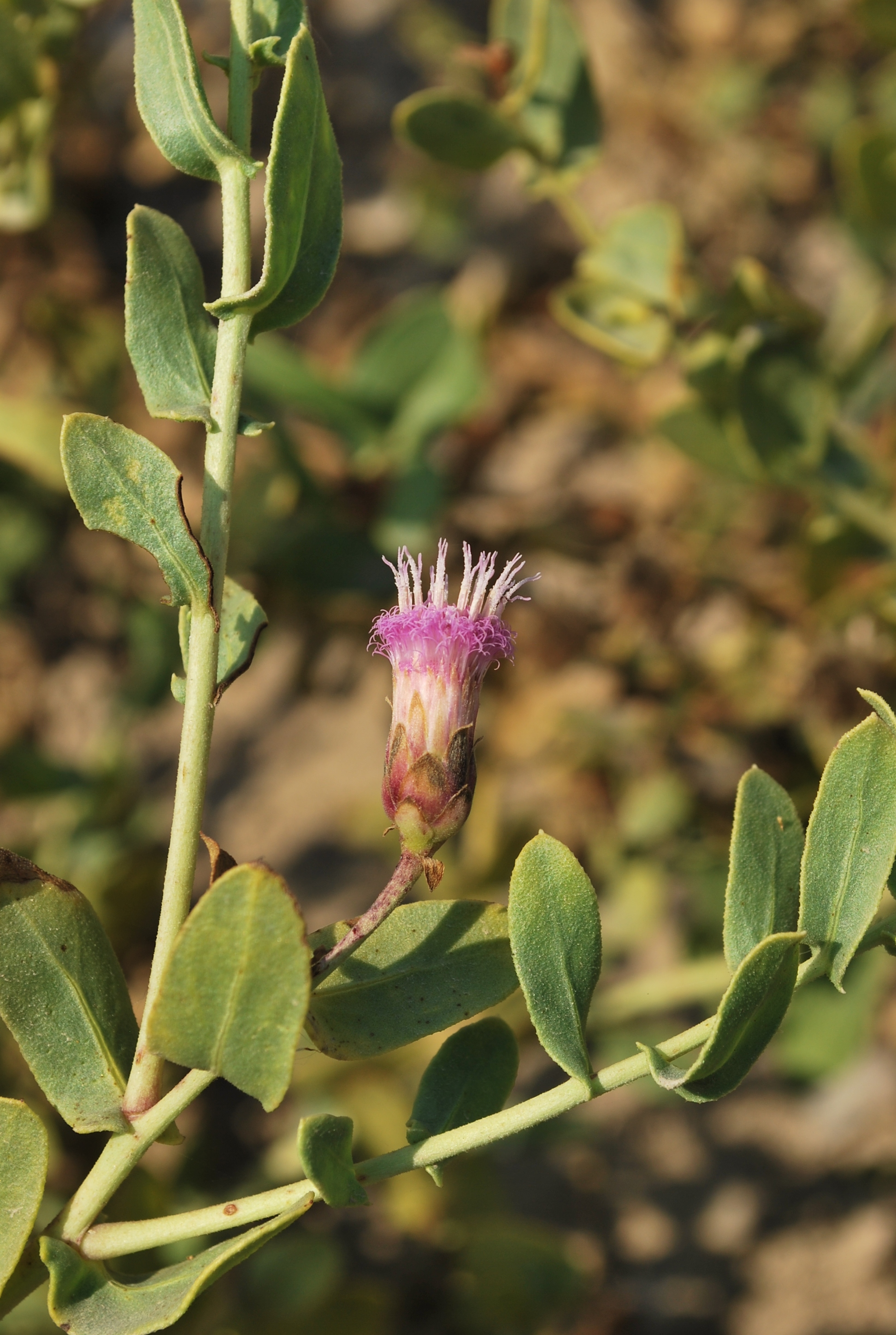

Scientific classification
- Kingdom: Plantae
- Clade: Tracheophytes
- Clade: Angiosperms
- Clade: Eudicots
- Clade: Asterids
- Order: Asterales
- Family: Asteraceae
- Subfamily: Asteroideae
- Tribe: Inuleae
- Genus: Karelinia; Less.
- Species: K. caspia

Binomial name
- Karelinia caspia (Pall.) Less.

Synonyms
- Karelinia caspica (Pall.) Less., alternate spelling; Serratula caspia Pall.; Pluchea caspia (Pall.) O.Hoffm. ex Paulsen

= Karelinia =

Genus of flowering plants

Karelinia is a genus of flowering plants in the daisy family.

The genus is named in honor of Grigory Karelin (1801–1872), Russian explorer.

Species

There is only one known species, Karelinia caspia, native to European Russia, Altai, Kazakhstan, Uzbekistan, Kyrgyzstan, Tajikistan, Turkmenistan, Turkey, Afghanistan, Iran, China (Xinjiang, Inner Mongolia, Qinghai, Gansu), and Mongolia.
