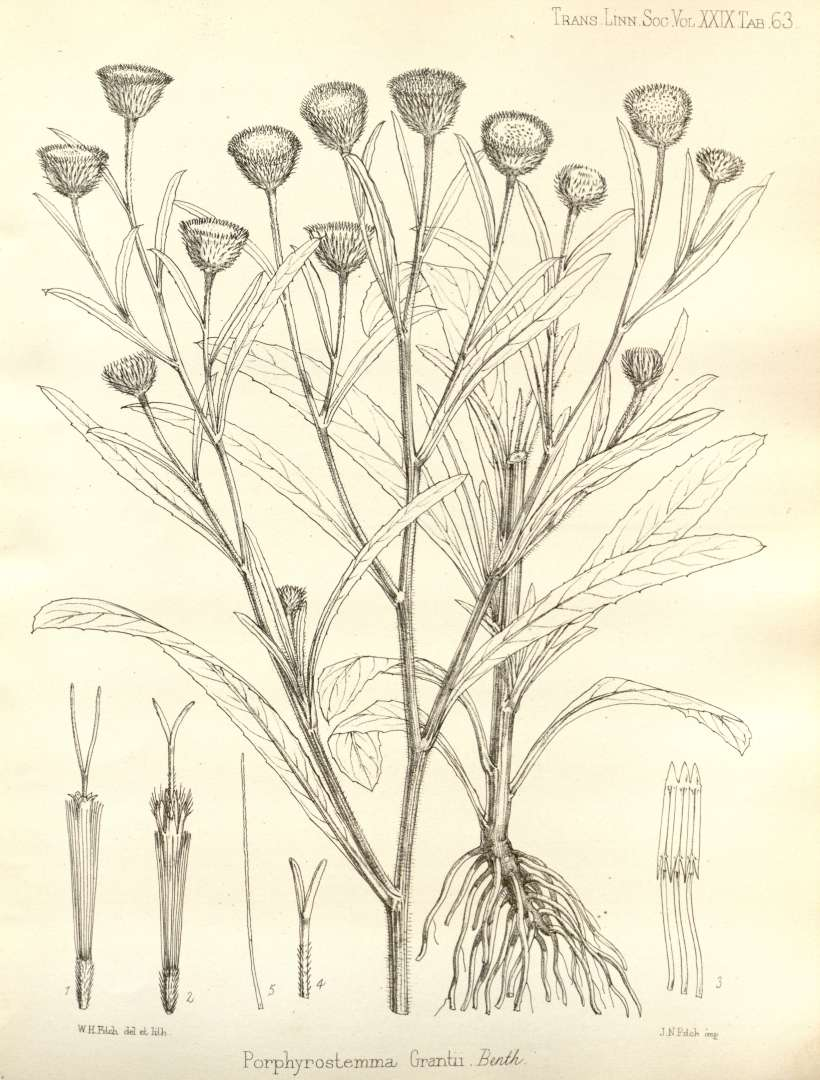
- Porphyrostemma grantii

Scientific classification
- Kingdom: Plantae
- Clade: Tracheophytes
- Clade: Angiosperms
- Clade: Eudicots
- Clade: Asterids
- Order: Asterales
- Family: Asteraceae
- Subfamily: Asteroideae
- Tribe: Inuleae
- Genus: Porphyrostemma; Benth. ex Oliv.

Type species
- Porphyrostemma grantii Bentham ex D. Oliver

= Porphyrostemma =

Genus of plants

Porphyrostemma is a genus of African plants in the tribe Inuleae within the family Asteraceae.

Species

- Porphyrostemma chevalieri (O.Hoffm.) Hutch. & Dalziel
- Porphyrostemma grantii Benth. ex Oliv.
- Porphyrostemma monocephala Leins

formerly included

see Inula

- Porphyrostemma cuanzensis (Welw.) O.Hoffm. - Inula cuanzensis (Welw.) Hiern
