= Delamerea =

Scientific classification
- Kingdom: Plantae
- Clade: Tracheophytes
- Clade: Angiosperms
- Clade: Eudicots
- Clade: Asterids
- Order: Asterales
- Family: Asteraceae
- Subfamily: Asteroideae
- Tribe: Inuleae
- Genus: Delamerea; S.Moore
- Species: D. procumbens

Binomial name
- Delamerea procumbens S.Moore

Genus of flowering plants

Delamerea is a genus of flowering plants in the daisy family, Asteraceae. There is only one known species, Delamerea procumbens, native to Kenya and Ethiopia.
