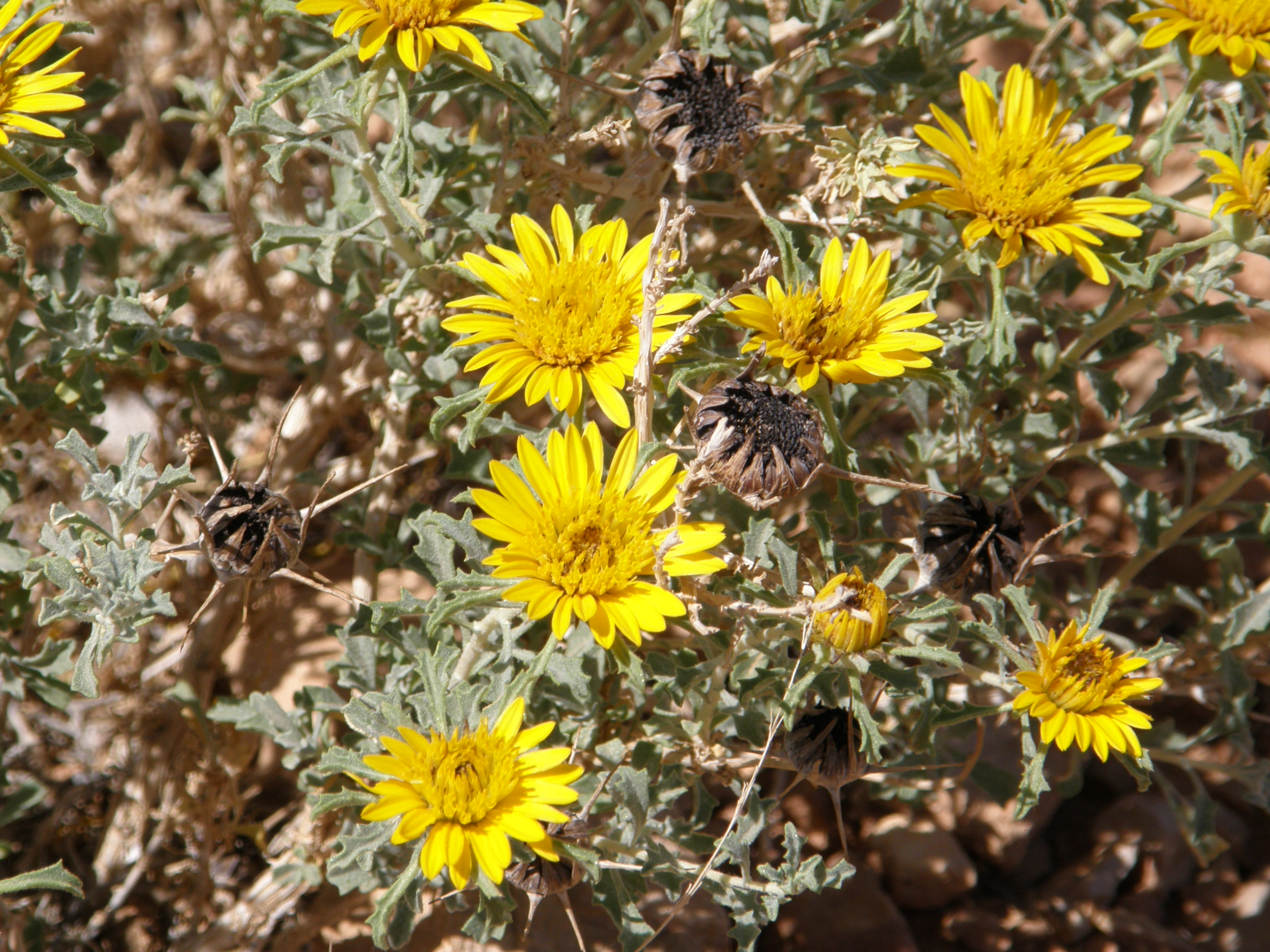
- Anvillea radiata

Scientific classification
- Kingdom: Plantae
- Clade: Embryophytes
- Clade: Tracheophytes
- Clade: Angiosperms
- Clade: Eudicots
- Clade: Asterids
- Order: Asterales
- Family: Asteraceae
- Subfamily: Asteroideae
- Tribe: Inuleae
- Genus: Anvillea; DC.

Type species
- Anvillea garcini (Burm.f.) DC.

Synonyms
- Anvilleina Maire

= Anvillea =

Genus of flowering plants

Anvillea is a genus of flowering plants in the daisy family.

Species

- Anvillea garcinii (Burm.f.) DC. - North Africa, Middle East, Arabian Peninsula
- Anvillea platycarpa (Maire) Anderb. - Morocco, Western Sahara
