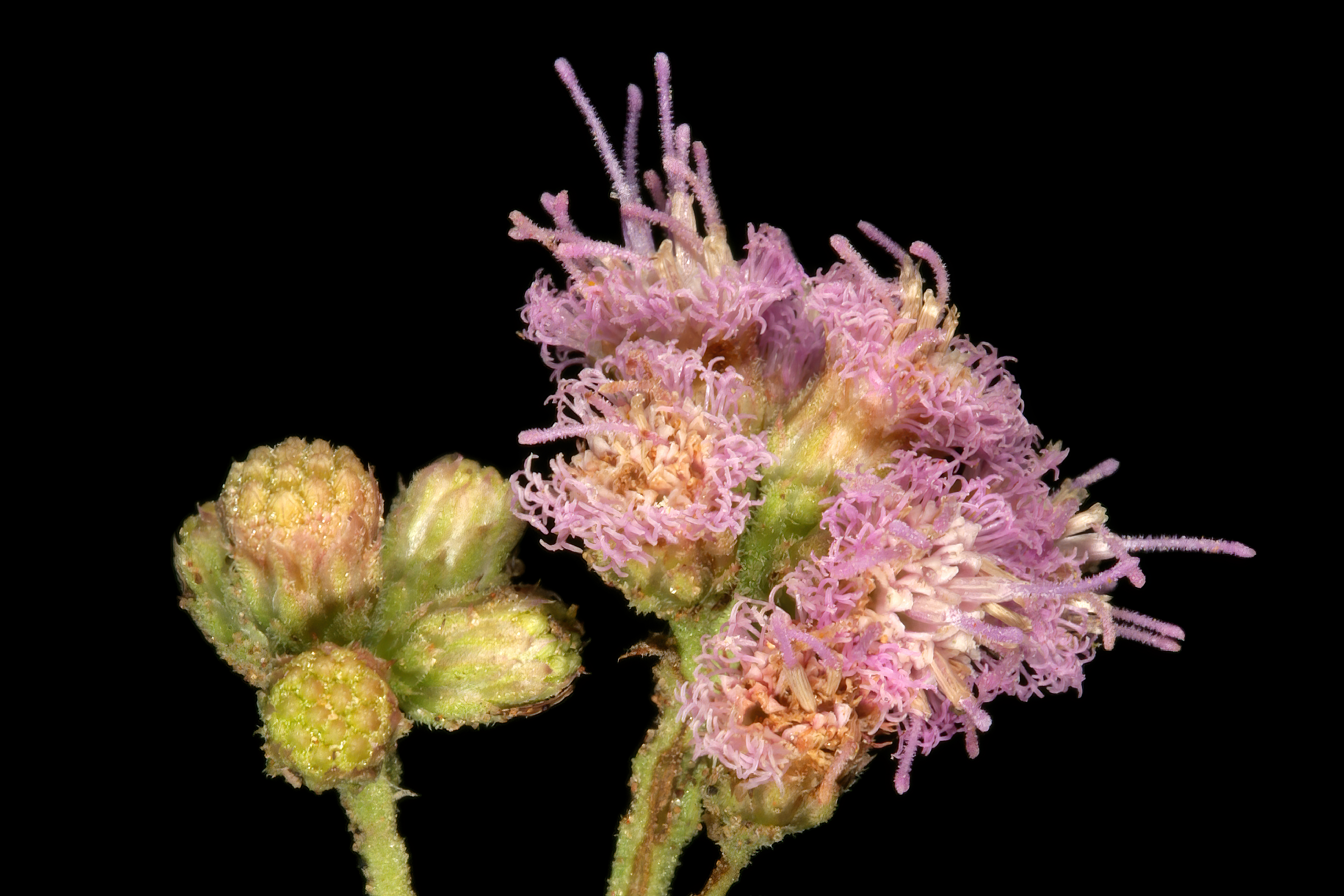
- Litogyne gariepina

Conservation status
- Least Concern (IUCN 3.1)

Scientific classification
- Kingdom: Plantae
- Clade: Tracheophytes
- Clade: Angiosperms
- Clade: Eudicots
- Clade: Asterids
- Order: Asterales
- Family: Asteraceae
- Subfamily: Asteroideae
- Tribe: Inuleae
- Genus: Litogyne; Harv.
- Species: L. gariepina

Binomial name
- Litogyne gariepina (DC.) Anderb.

= Litogyne =

Genus of plants

Litogyne is a monotypic genus of flowering plants belonging to the family Asteraceae. The only species is Litogyne gariepina.

Its native range is Tropical and Southern Africa.
