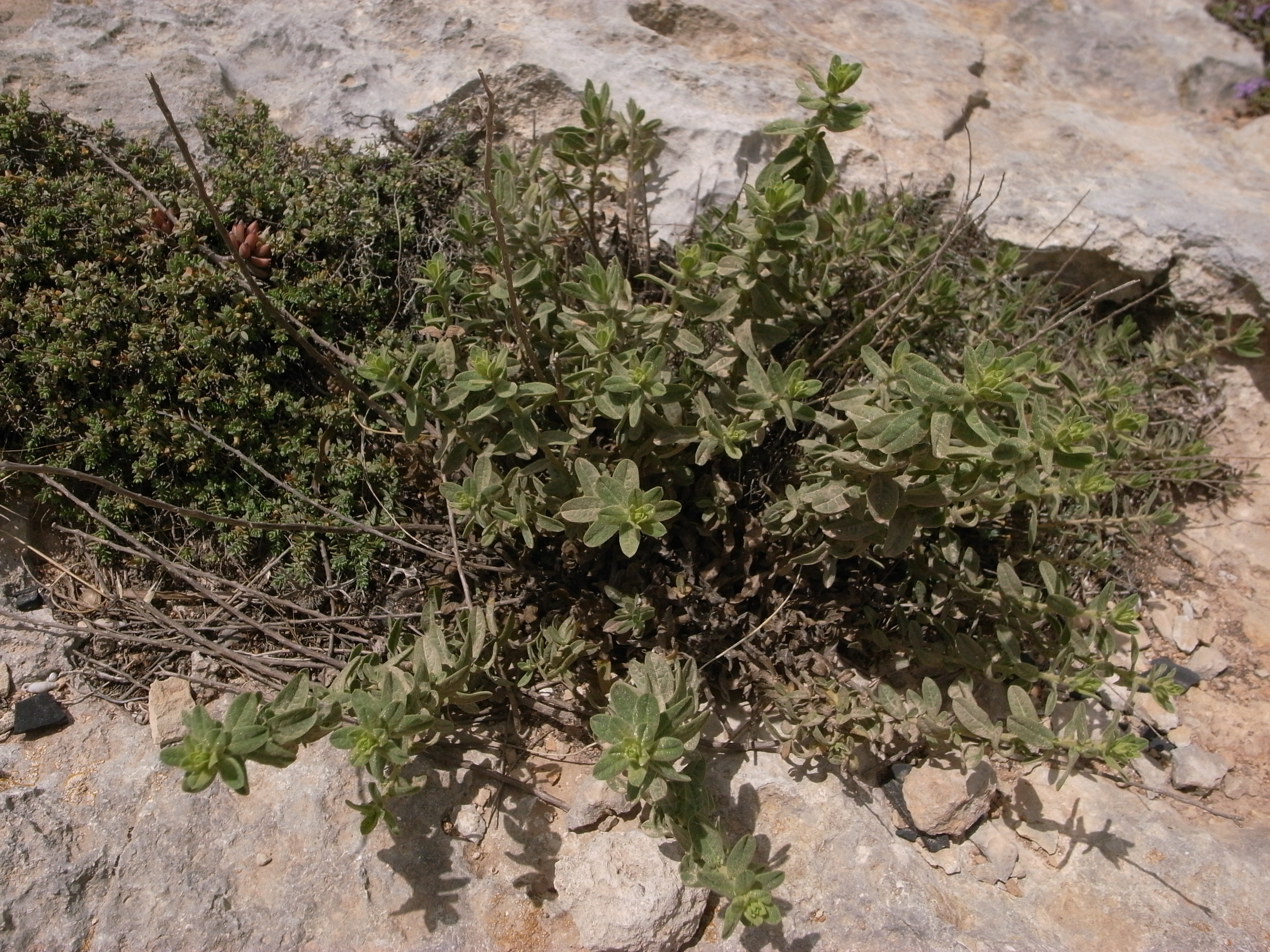

Scientific classification
- Kingdom: Plantae
- Clade: Tracheophytes
- Clade: Angiosperms
- Clade: Eudicots
- Clade: Asterids
- Order: Asterales
- Family: Asteraceae
- Genus: Chiliadenus
- Species: C. bocconei

Binomial name
- Chiliadenus bocconei Brullo

= Chiliadenus bocconei =

Species of plant

Chiliadenus bocconei is a species of plant in the family Asteraceae. It is endemic to Malta.

== Sources ==
This article incorporates text from a free content work. Licensed under CC0 (license statement/permission). Text taken from Chiliadenus bocconei S. Brullo. Encyclopedia of Life.
