= Chrysophthalmum =

Scientific classification
- Kingdom: Plantae
- Clade: Tracheophytes
- Clade: Angiosperms
- Clade: Eudicots
- Clade: Asterids
- Order: Asterales
- Family: Asteraceae
- Subfamily: Asteroideae
- Tribe: Inuleae
- Genus: Chrysophthalmum; Sch.Bip. ex Walp. 1843 not Phil. 1857 (illegitimate syn of Grindelia)

Genus of flowering plants

Chrysophthalmum is a genus of flowering plants in the family Asteraceae.

Species

- Chrysophthalmum dichotomum Boiss. & Heldr. - Turkey
- Chrysophthalmum gueneri Aytaç & Anderb. - Turkey
- Chrysophthalmum leptocladum Rech.f.- Iran
- Chrysophthalmum montanum (DC.) Boiss. - Turkey, Iraq
