= Allopterigeron =

Scientific classification
- Kingdom: Plantae
- Clade: Embryophytes
- Clade: Tracheophytes
- Clade: Spermatophytes
- Clade: Angiosperms
- Clade: Eudicots
- Clade: Asterids
- Order: Asterales
- Family: Asteraceae
- Tribe: Inuleae
- Subtribe: Plucheinae
- Genus: Allopterigeron; Dunlop
- Species: A. filifolius

Binomial name
- Allopterigeron filifolius (F.Muell.) Dunlop

Synonyms
- Pluchea filifolia F.Muell.; Pterigeron filifolius (F.Muell.) Benth.

Genus of flowering plants

Allopterigeron is a genus of flowering plants in the daisy family described as a genus in 1981.

There is only one known species, Allopterigeron filifolius, endemic to Australia. It is known from Queensland and Northern Territory.
