= Blumeopsis =

Scientific classification
- Kingdom: Plantae
- Clade: Embryophytes
- Clade: Tracheophytes
- Clade: Angiosperms
- Clade: Eudicots
- Clade: Asterids
- Order: Asterales
- Family: Asteraceae
- Subfamily: Asteroideae
- Tribe: Inuleae
- Genus: Blumeopsis; Gagnep.

Type species
- Blumeopsis flava (DC.) Gagnep.

Genus of flowering plants

Blumeopsis is a genus of flowering plants in the family Asteraceae. Its size can range from 25–100 centimeters (9.8–39.4 inches).

Blumeopsis is sometimes treated as monotypic, including only Blumeopsis flava. Some sources accept a second species, Blumeopsis falcata.

Blumeopsis can also be used for medical purposes as it has been shown to help with cough, colds, and bronchial diseases.

The genus is native to southern China, the Indian subcontinent, and Southeast Asia.
