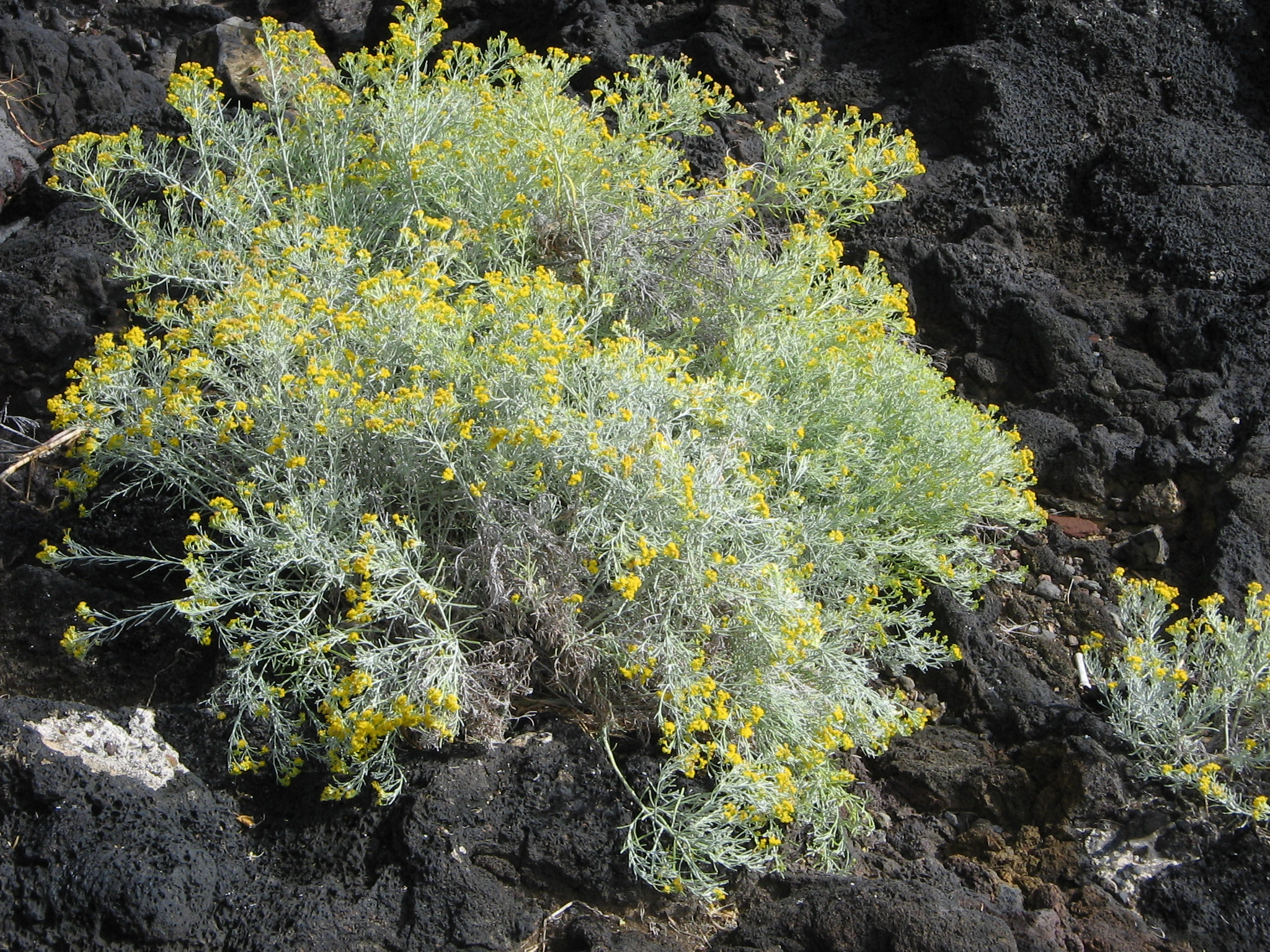
- Schizogyne sericea
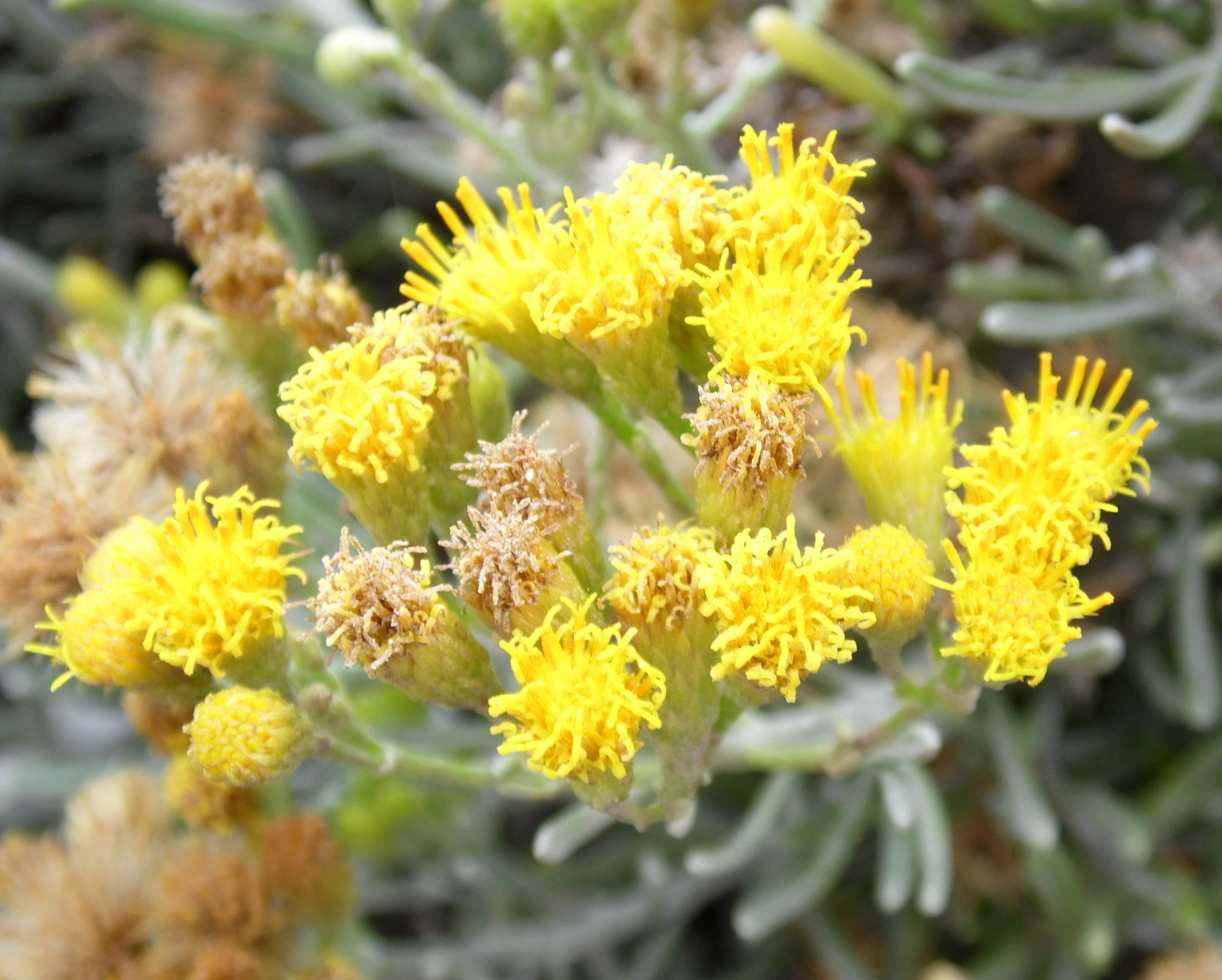
- Schizogyne sericea

Scientific classification
- Kingdom: Plantae
- Clade: Tracheophytes
- Clade: Angiosperms
- Clade: Eudicots
- Clade: Asterids
- Order: Asterales
- Family: Asteraceae
- Subfamily: Asteroideae
- Tribe: Inuleae
- Genus: Schizogyne; Cass. 1828, not Ehrenb. ex Pax 1924 (syn of Acalypha in Euphorbiaceae)

= Schizogyne =

Genus of plants

Schizogyne is a plant genus in the tribe Inuleae within the family Asteraceae. It was established in 1828 by French botanist Alexandre de Cassini.

Species

- Schizogyne glaberrima DC. - Canary Islands (Tenerife + Gran Canaria)
- Schizogyne obtusifolia Cass. - Canary Islands (Tenerife)
- Schizogyne sericea (L.f.) DC. - Canary Islands, Salvage Islands
