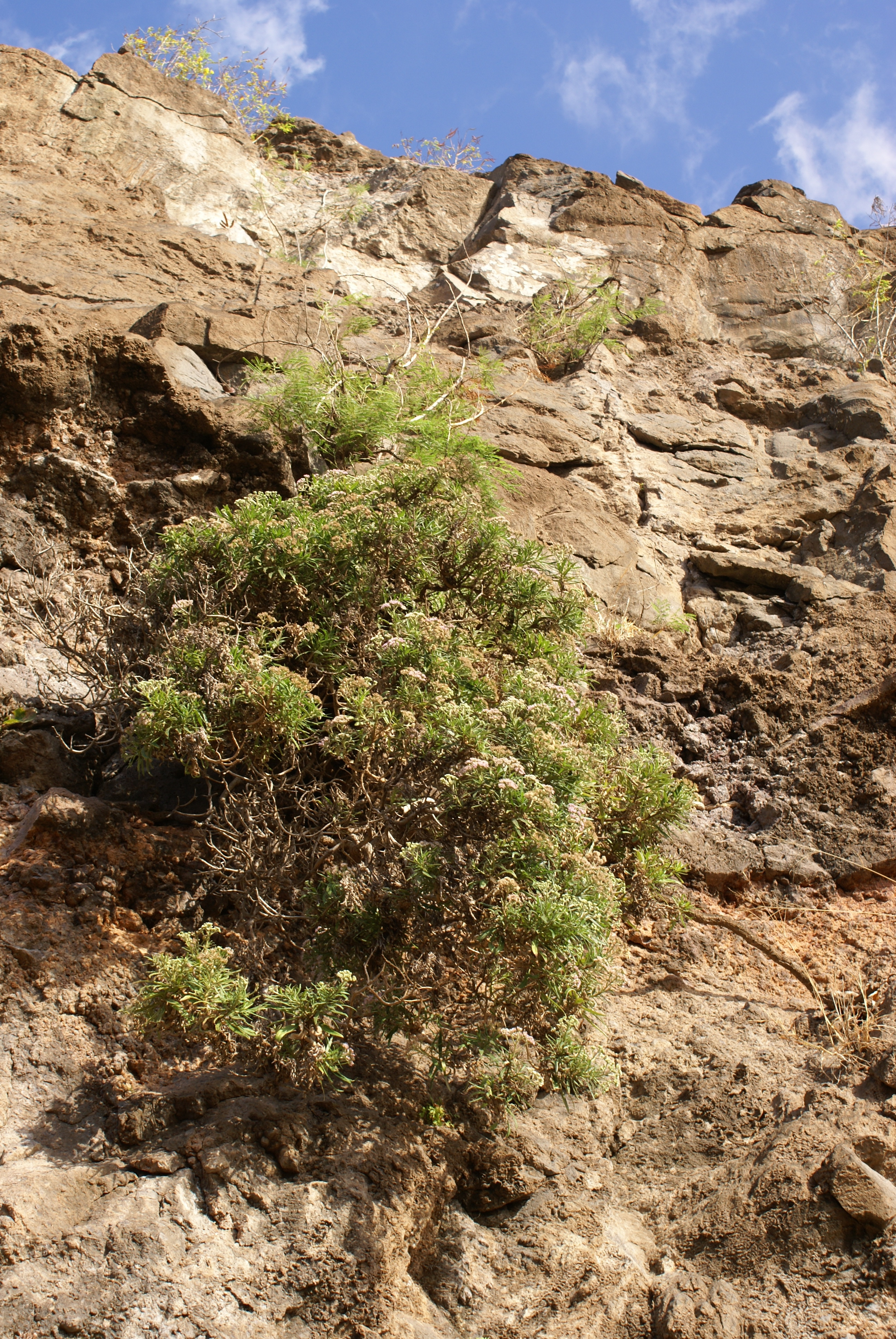
- Monarrhenis salicifolius

Conservation status
- Critically Endangered (IUCN 2.3)

Scientific classification
- Kingdom: Plantae
- Clade: Tracheophytes
- Clade: Angiosperms
- Clade: Eudicots
- Clade: Asterids
- Order: Asterales
- Family: Asteraceae
- Genus: Monarrhenus
- Species: M. salicifolius

Binomial name
- Monarrhenus salicifolius Cass.

Synonyms
- Conyza angustifolia Steud.; Conyza salicifolia Lam.

= Monarrhenus salicifolius =

Species of flowering plant

Monarrhenus salicifolius is a species of plant in the sunflower family found in rocky areas. It is endemic to the Mascarene Islands: Mauritius and Réunion.
