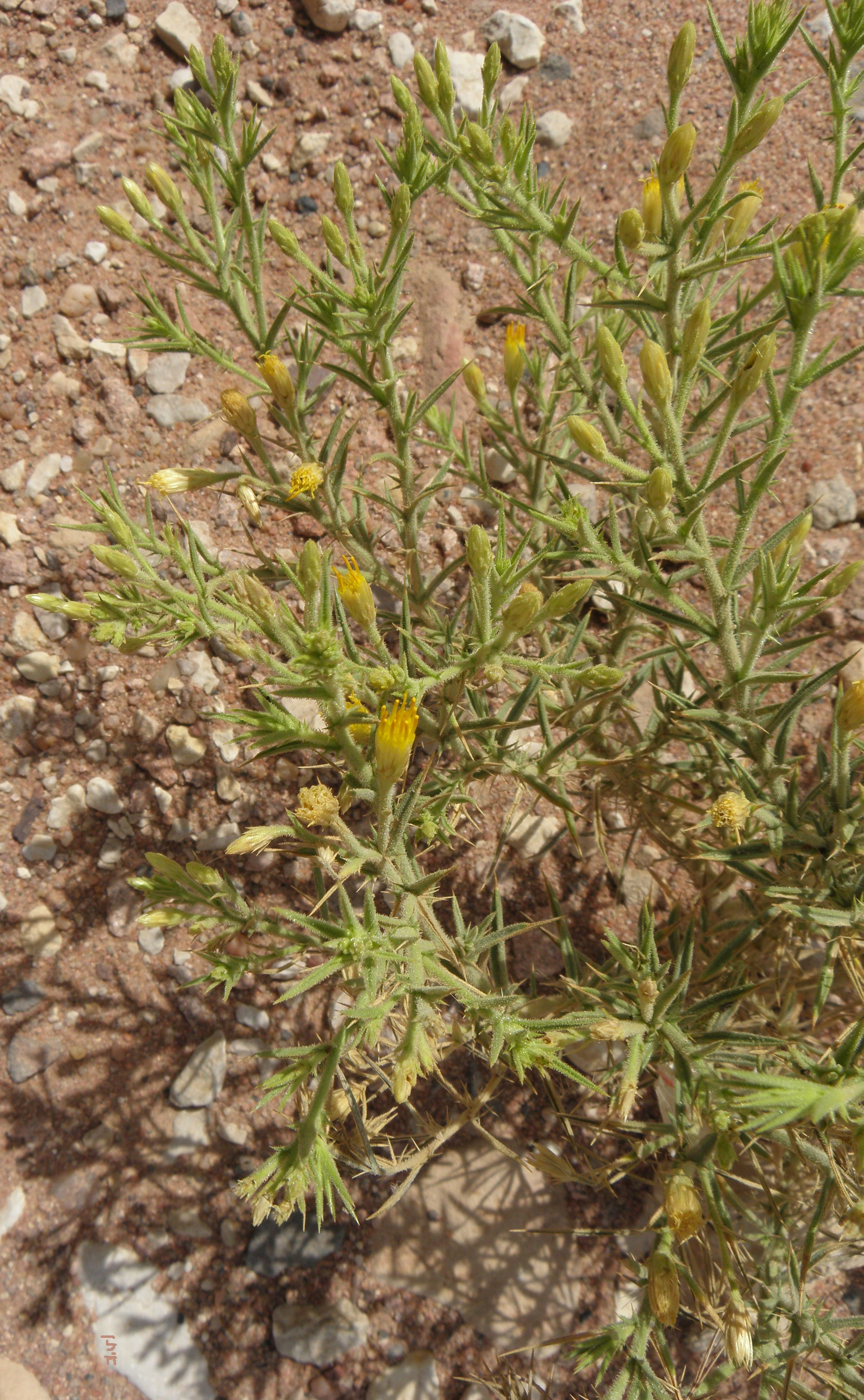
- Iphiona scabra

Scientific classification
- Kingdom: Plantae
- Clade: Tracheophytes
- Clade: Angiosperms
- Clade: Eudicots
- Clade: Asterids
- Order: Asterales
- Family: Asteraceae
- Subfamily: Asteroideae
- Tribe: Inuleae
- Genus: Iphiona; Cass.

Type species
- Iphiona dubia Cassini

Synonyms
- Perralderiopsis Rauschert; Carphopappus Sch.Bip. ex Sch.Bip.; Grantia Boiss.; Hirschia Baker

= Iphiona =

Genus of flowering plants

Iphiona is a genus of Asian and African flowering plants in the daisy family.

Species

- Iphiona arachnoidea (Boiss.) Anderb.
- Iphiona aucheri (Boiss.) Anderb.
- Iphiona grantioides (Boiss.) Anderb.
- Iphiona horrida Boiss.
- Iphiona mucronata (Forssk.) Asch. & Schweinf.
- Iphiona phillipsiae (S.Moore) Anderb.
- Iphiona pinnatifida Mesfin
- Iphiona scabra DC. ex Decne.
- Iphiona senecionoides (Baker) Anderb.
