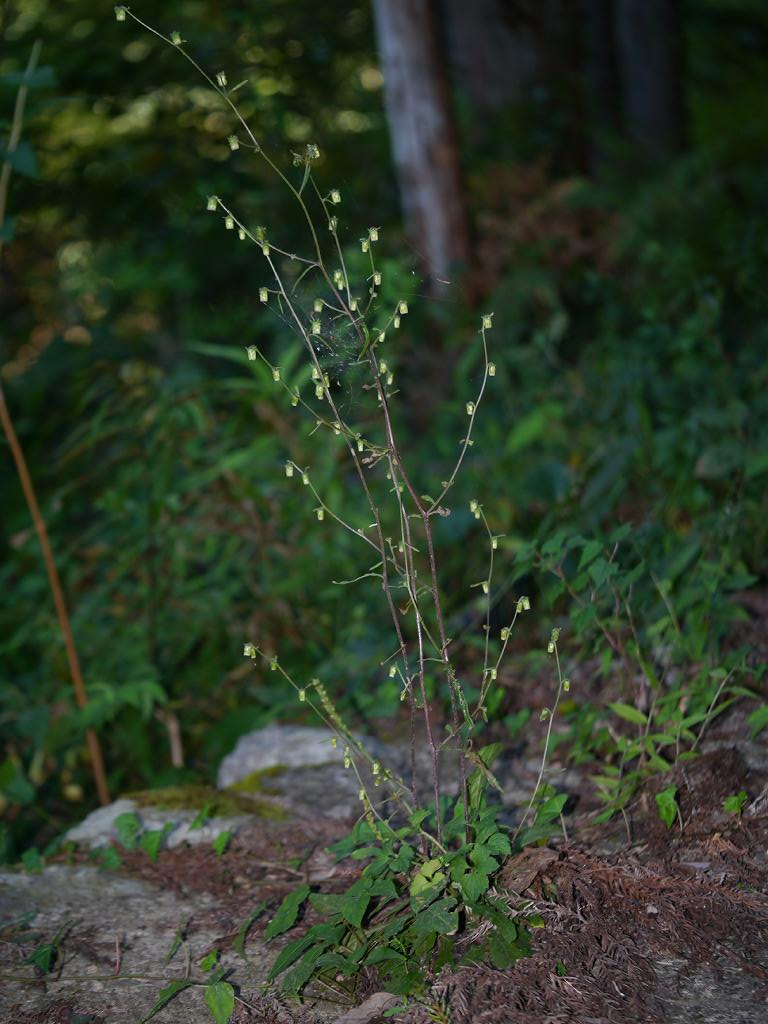
- Carpesium rosulatum

Scientific classification
- Kingdom: Plantae
- Clade: Embryophytes
- Clade: Tracheophytes
- Clade: Angiosperms
- Clade: Eudicots
- Clade: Asterids
- Order: Asterales
- Family: Asteraceae
- Subfamily: Asteroideae
- Tribe: Inuleae
- Genus: Carpesium; L.

Type species
- Carpesium cernuum L.

= Carpesium =

Genus of flowering plants

Carpesium is a genus of flowering plants in the aster family, Asteraceae. They are distributed in Europe and Asia; most occur in China and several are endemic to the country.

These are mainly perennial herbs, but a few species are annuals. The alternately arranged leaves have smooth or toothed edges and are sometimes borne on winged petioles. The flower heads occur at the ends of branches or in the leaf axils, alone or in clusters. There are many yellowish disc florets at the center and usually some tubular or ray-like florets around the edge of the head. The fruit is a hairless, ribbed, beaked achene.

Several species, including C. abrotanoides, C. divaricatum, and C. rosulatum, have been used in traditional medicine in China and Korea.

Species

- Carpesium abrotanoides
- Carpesium cernuum
- Carpesium cordatum
- Carpesium divaricatum
- Carpesium faberi
- Carpesium gigas
- Carpesium glossophyllum
- Carpesium humile
- Carpesium kweichowense
- Carpesium leptophyllum
- Carpesium lipskyi
- Carpesium longifolium
- Carpesium macrocephalum
- Carpesium minus
- Carpesium nepalense
- Carpesium rosulatum
- Carpesium scapiforme
- Carpesium spathiforme
- Carpesium szechuanense
- Carpesium trachelifolium
- Carpesium triste
- Carpesium velutinum
- Carpesium verbascifolium
- Carpesium zhouquensis
