= Pseudoconyza =

Scientific classification
- Kingdom: Plantae
- Clade: Tracheophytes
- Clade: Angiosperms
- Clade: Eudicots
- Clade: Asterids
- Order: Asterales
- Family: Asteraceae
- Subfamily: Asteroideae
- Tribe: Inuleae
- Genus: Pseudoconyza; Cuatrec.
- Species: P. viscosa

Binomial name
- Pseudoconyza viscosa (Mill.) D'Arcy

Synonyms
- Synonymy: Ernstia V.M.Badillo; Blumea aurita DC.; Blumea bojeri Baker; Blumea glutinosa DC.; Blumea guineensis DC.; Blumea lyrata (Kunth) V.M.Badillo; Blumea microphylla Chiov.; Blumea obliqua var. aurita (L.f.) Naik & Bhog.; Blumea senegalensis DC.; Blumea viscosa (Mill.) V.M.Badillo; Blumea viscosa var. lyrata (Kunth) D'Arcy; Conyza argentea Perr. & Lepyr. ex DC.; Conyza aurita L.f.; Conyza chiapensis Brandegee; Conyza guineensis Willd.; Conyza lyrata Kunth; Conyza lyrata var. pilosa Fernald; Conyza rudis Willd. ex Steud.; Conyza senegalensis Sieber ex DC.; Conyza villosa Willd.; Conyza viscosa Mill.; Erigeron chinensis Siebold ex DC.; Erigeron lyratus (Kunth) M.Gómez; Erigeron stipulatus Schumach. & Thonn.; Ernstia lyrata (Kunth) V.M.Badillo; Eschenbachia lyrata (Kunth) Britton & Millsp.; Eupatorium lyratum J.M.Coult.; Laggera aurita Benth. ex C.B.Clarke; Laggera lyrata (Kunth) Leins; Laggera viscosa (Mill.) Zareh; Marsea lyrata (Kunth) Kuntze; Marsea viscosa (Mill.) Britten; Pluchea kotschyi Sch.Bip.; Pseudoconyza lyrata (Kunth) Cuatrec.; Pseudoconyza viscosa var. lyrata (Kunth) D'Arcy

Genus of plants

Pseudoconyza is a genus of flowering plants belonging to the family Asteraceae. It includes a single species, Pseudoconyza viscosa.

Its native range is the tropics and subtropics.
