= Lifago =

Scientific classification
- Kingdom: Plantae
- Clade: Embryophytes
- Clade: Tracheophytes
- Clade: Angiosperms
- Clade: Eudicots
- Clade: Asterids
- Order: Asterales
- Family: Asteraceae
- Subfamily: Asteroideae
- Tribe: Inuleae
- Genus: Lifago; Schweinf. & Muschl.
- Species: L. dielsii

Binomial name
- Lifago dielsii Schweinf. & Muschl.

Synonyms
- Niclouxia Batt.; Niclouxia saharae Batt.

Genus of flowering plants

Lifago is a genus of flowering plants in the tribe Inuleae within the family Asteraceae.

Species

There is only one known species, Lifago dielsii, native to the western part of the Sahara Desert in Algeria and Morocco.
