= Rhodogeron =

Scientific classification
- Kingdom: Plantae
- Clade: Tracheophytes
- Clade: Angiosperms
- Clade: Eudicots
- Clade: Asterids
- Order: Asterales
- Family: Asteraceae
- Subfamily: Asteroideae
- Tribe: Inuleae
- Genus: Rhodogeron; Griseb.
- Species: R. coronopifolius

Binomial name
- Rhodogeron coronopifolius Griseb.

Synonyms
- Sachsia coronopifolia (Griseb.) Anderb.

Genus of plants

Rhodogeron is a genus of flowering plants in the tribe Inuleae within the family Asteraceae.

Species

The only known species is Rhodogeron coronopifolius, found only in Cuba.
