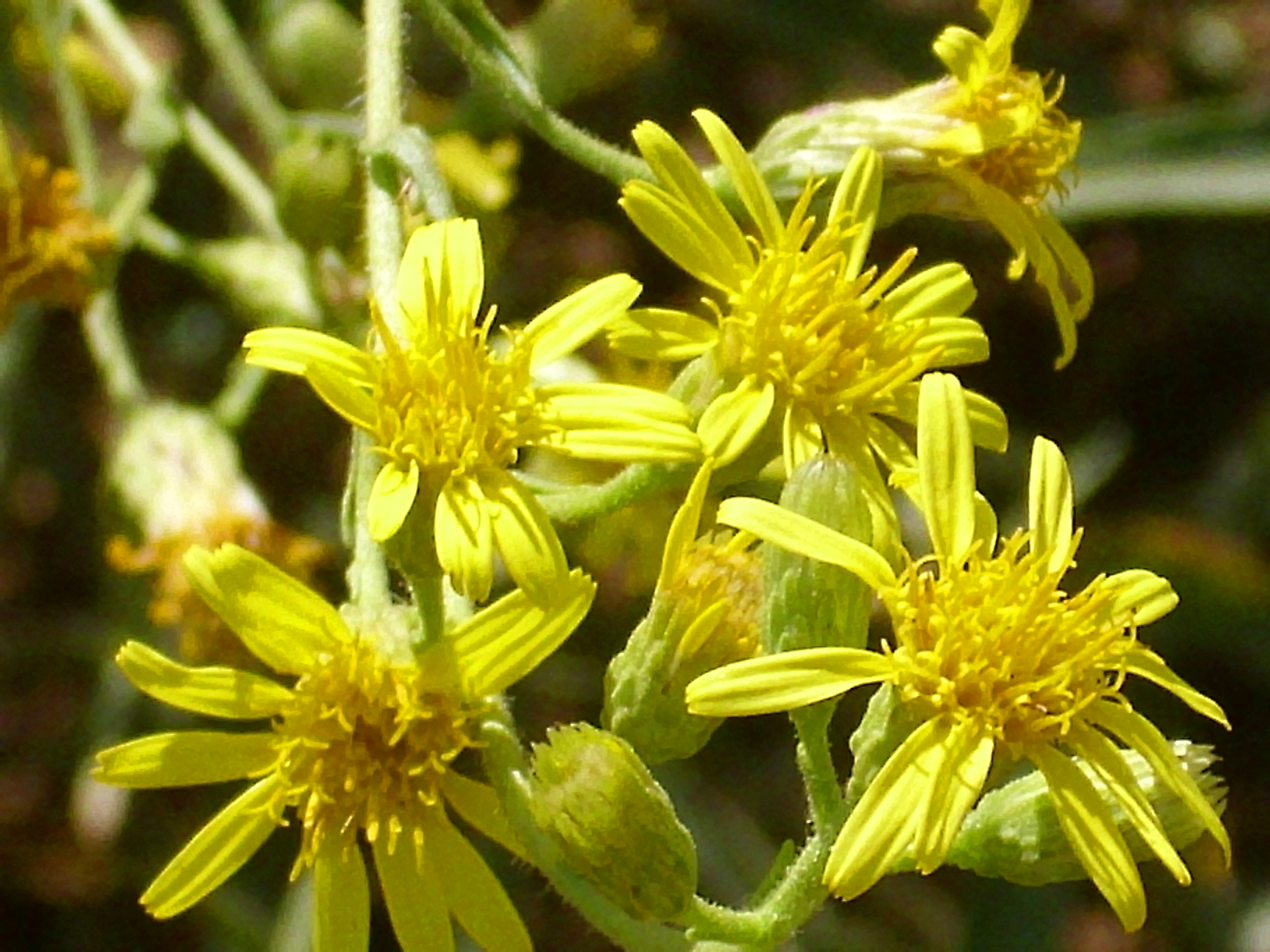
- False yellowhead (Dittrichia viscosa)

Scientific classification
- Kingdom: Plantae
- Clade: Tracheophytes
- Clade: Angiosperms
- Clade: Eudicots
- Clade: Asterids
- Order: Asterales
- Family: Asteraceae
- Subfamily: Asteroideae
- Tribe: Inuleae; Cass.

Genera
- See text

= Inuleae =

Tribe of flowering plants

Inuleae is a tribe of flowering plants in the subfamily Asteroideae.

== Genera ==
Inuleae genera recognized by the Global Compositae Database as of April 2022:

- Adelostigma Steetz
- Allagopappus Cass.
- Allopterigeron Dunlop
- Amblyocarpum Fisch. & C.A.Mey.
- Antiphiona Merxm.
- Anvillea DC.
- Asteriscus Tourn. ex Mill.
- Blumea DC.
- Blumeopsis Gagnep.
- Buphthalmum L.
- Caesulia Roxb.
- Calostephane Benth.
- Carpesium L.
- Chiliadenus Cass.
- Chrysophthalmum Sch.Bip. ex Walp.
- Coleocoma F.Muell.
- Cratystylis S.Moore
- Cyathocline Cass.
- Cylindrocline Cass.
- Delamerea S.Moore
- Dittrichia Greuter
- Doellia Sch.Bip.
- Duhaldea DC.
- Epaltes Cass.
- Feddea Urb.
- Geigeria Griess.
- Ighermia Wiklund
- Inula L.
- Iphiona Cass.
- Iphionopsis Anderb.
- Jasonia (Cass.) Cass.
- Karelinia Less.
- Laggera Sch.Bip. ex Benth. & Hook.f.
- Lifago Schweinf. & Muschl.
- Limbarda Adans.
- Litogyne Harv.
- Merrittia Merr.
- Monarrhenus Cass.
- Musilia Velen.
- Nanothamnus Thomson
- Neojeffreya Cabrera
- Nicolasia S.Moore
- Ondetia Benth.
- Pallenis (Cass.) Cass.
- Pechuel-loeschea O.Hoffm.
- Pegolettia Cass.
- Pentanema Cass.
- Perralderia Coss.
- Pluchea Cass.
- Porphyrostemma Benth. ex Oliv.
- Pseudoblepharispermum J.-P.Lebrun & Stork
- Pseudoconyza Cuatrec.
- Pterocaulon Elliott
- Pulicaria Gaertn.
- Rhanteriopsis Rauschert
- Rhanterium Desf.
- Rhodogeron Griseb.
- Sachsia Griseb.
- Schizogyne Cass.
- Sphaeranthus L.
- Stenachaenium Benth.
- Streptoglossa Steetz ex F.Muell.
- Telekia Baumg.
- Tessaria Ruiz & Pav.
- Thespidium F.Muell. ex Benth.
- Triplocephalum O.Hoffm.
- Varthemia DC.
- Vieraea Webb ex Sch.Bip.
