= Nicolasia =

Scientific classification
- Kingdom: Plantae
- Clade: Tracheophytes
- Clade: Angiosperms
- Clade: Eudicots
- Clade: Asterids
- Order: Asterales
- Family: Asteraceae
- Subfamily: Asteroideae
- Tribe: Inuleae
- Genus: Nicolasia; S.Moore

Type species
- Nicolasia heterophylla S.Moore

Genus of flowering plants

Nicolasia is a genus of African flowering plants in the tribe Inuleae within the family Asteraceae.

== Species ==
Accepted species include:

- Nicolasia coronata Wild
- Nicolasia costata Thell.
- Nicolasia felicioides S.Moore
- Nicolasia heterophylla S.Moore
- Nicolasia nitens (O.Hoffm.) Leins
- Nicolasia pedunculata S.Moore
- Nicolasia stenoptera (O.Hoffm.) Merxm.
