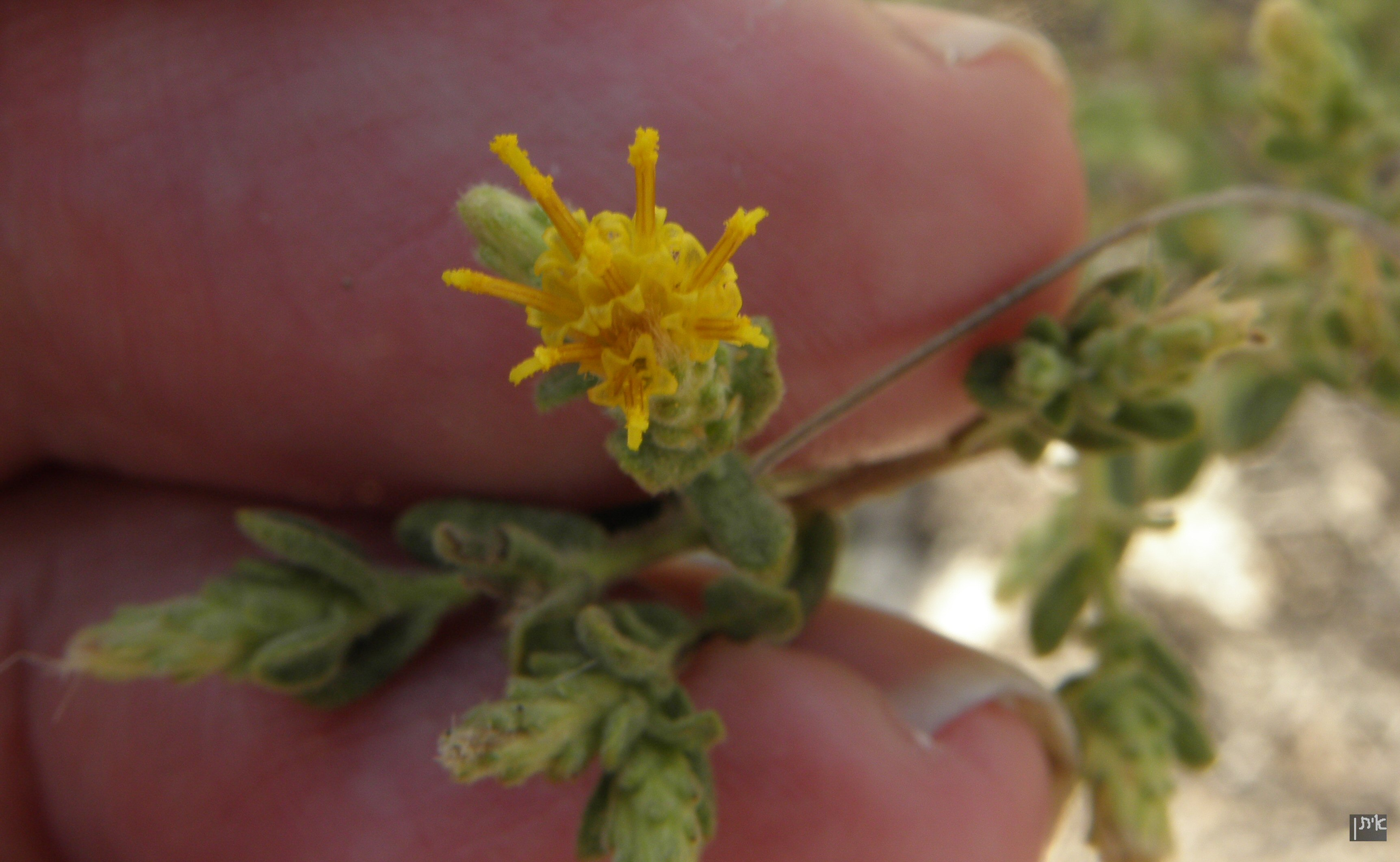
- Varthemia iphionoides

Scientific classification
- Kingdom: Plantae
- Clade: Tracheophytes
- Clade: Angiosperms
- Clade: Eudicots
- Clade: Asterids
- Order: Asterales
- Family: Asteraceae
- Subfamily: Asteroideae
- Tribe: Inuleae
- Genus: Varthemia; A. P. de Candolle

Type species
- Varthemia persica A. P. de Candolle

Species
- Varthemia iphionoides; Varthemia persica

= Varthemia =

Genus of flowering plants

Varthemia is a genus of flowering plants in the family Asteraceae.

Varthemia iphionoides (also known as Chiliadenus iphinoides), is a small perennial shrub that belongs to the Varthemia genus. It grows in Israel, Syria, Lebanon, Jordan and Sinai. It has various pharmacological properties including anti-diabetic, anti-oxidant, anti-platelet, and anti-bacterial effects.
