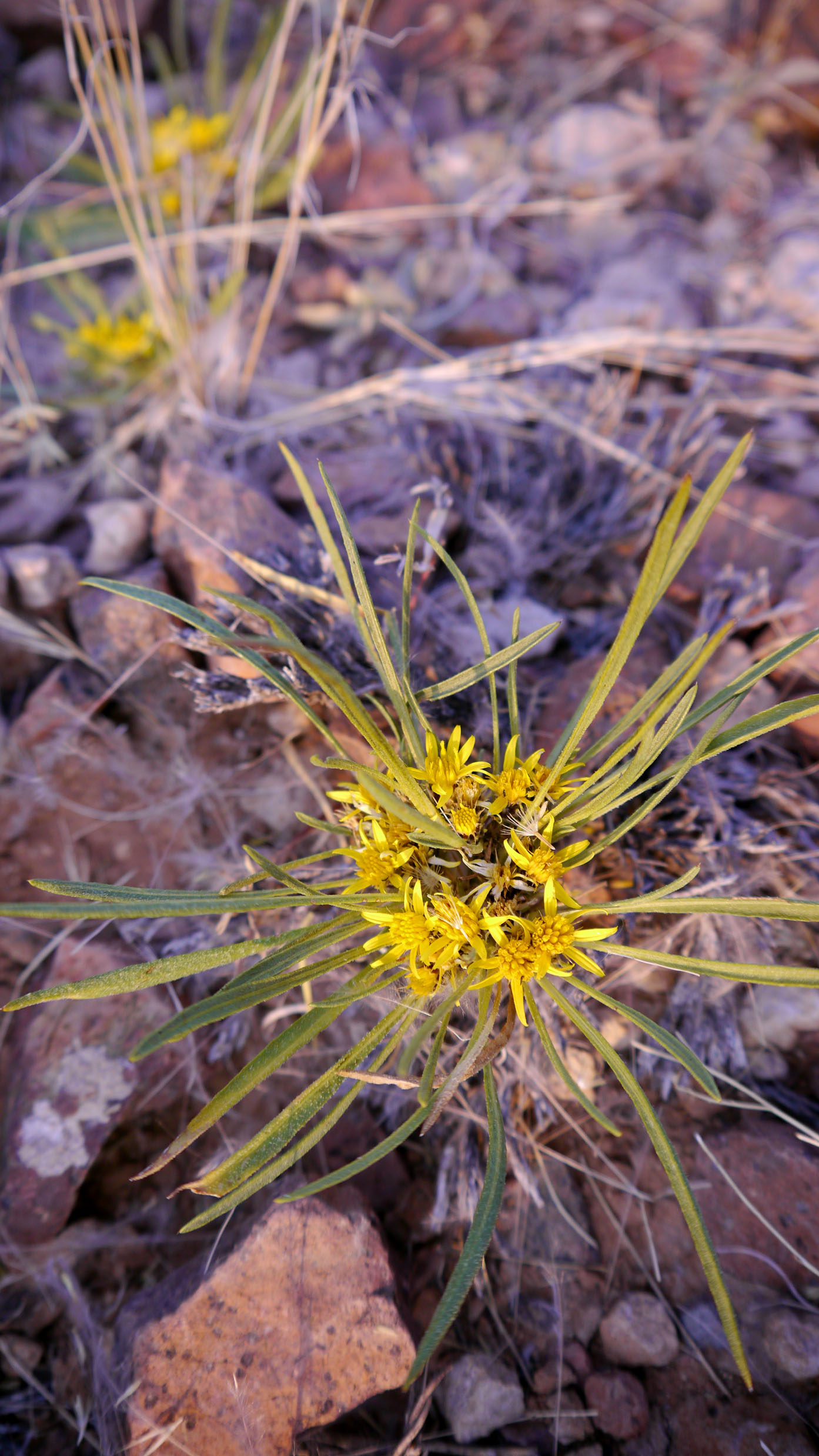
- Geigeria ornativa

Scientific classification
- Kingdom: Plantae
- Clade: Tracheophytes
- Clade: Angiosperms
- Clade: Eudicots
- Clade: Asterids
- Order: Asterales
- Family: Asteraceae
- Subfamily: Asteroideae
- Tribe: Inuleae
- Genus: Geigeria; Griesselich

Type species
- Geigeria africana Griesselich

Synonyms
- Dizonium Willd. ex Schltdl.; Araschcoolia Sch.Bip.; Diplostemma Hochst. & Steud. ex DC.

= Geigeria =

Genus of flowering plants

Geigeria is a genus of African flowering plants in the daisy family.

Species

- Geigeria acaulis
- Geigeria acicularis
- Geigeria affinis
- Geigeria alata
- Geigeria angolensis
- Geigeria aspalathoides
- Geigeria aspera
- Geigeria brachycephala
- Geigeria brevifolia
- Geigeria burkei
- Geigeria decurrens
- Geigeria elongata
- Geigeria englerana
- Geigeria filifolia
- Geigeria hoffmanniana
- Geigeria lata
- Geigeria linosyroides
- Geigeria mendoncae
- Geigeria nianganensis
- Geigeria obtusifolia
- Geigeria odontoptera
- Geigeria ornativa
- Geigeria otaviensis
- Geigeria pectidea
- Geigeria pilifera
- Geigeria plumosa
- Geigeria rigida
- Geigeria schinzii
- Geigeria spinosa
- Geigeria vigintisquamea
