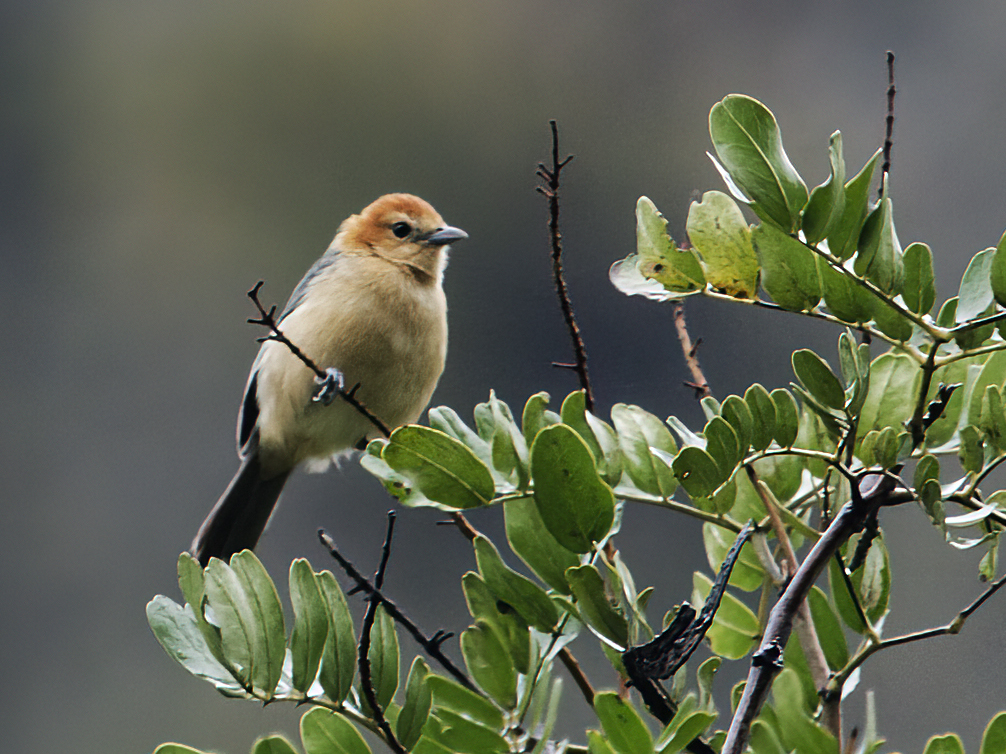

Conservation status
- Least Concern (IUCN 3.1)

Scientific classification
- Kingdom: Animalia
- Phylum: Chordata
- Class: Aves
- Order: Passeriformes
- Family: Thraupidae
- Genus: Thlypopsis
- Species: T. inornata

Binomial name
- Thlypopsis inornata (Taczanowski, 1879)

= Buff-bellied tanager =

Species of bird

The buff-bellied tanager (Thlypopsis inornata) is a species of bird in the family Thraupidae, the tanagers and allies. It is found in Ecuador and Peru.

== Taxonomy and systematics ==
The buff-bellied tanager was formally described in 1879 with the binomial Nemosia inornata. By 1938 it had been reassigned to its present genus Thlypopsis. Its closest relative is the orange-headed tanager (T. sordida).

The buff-bellied tanager is monotypic.

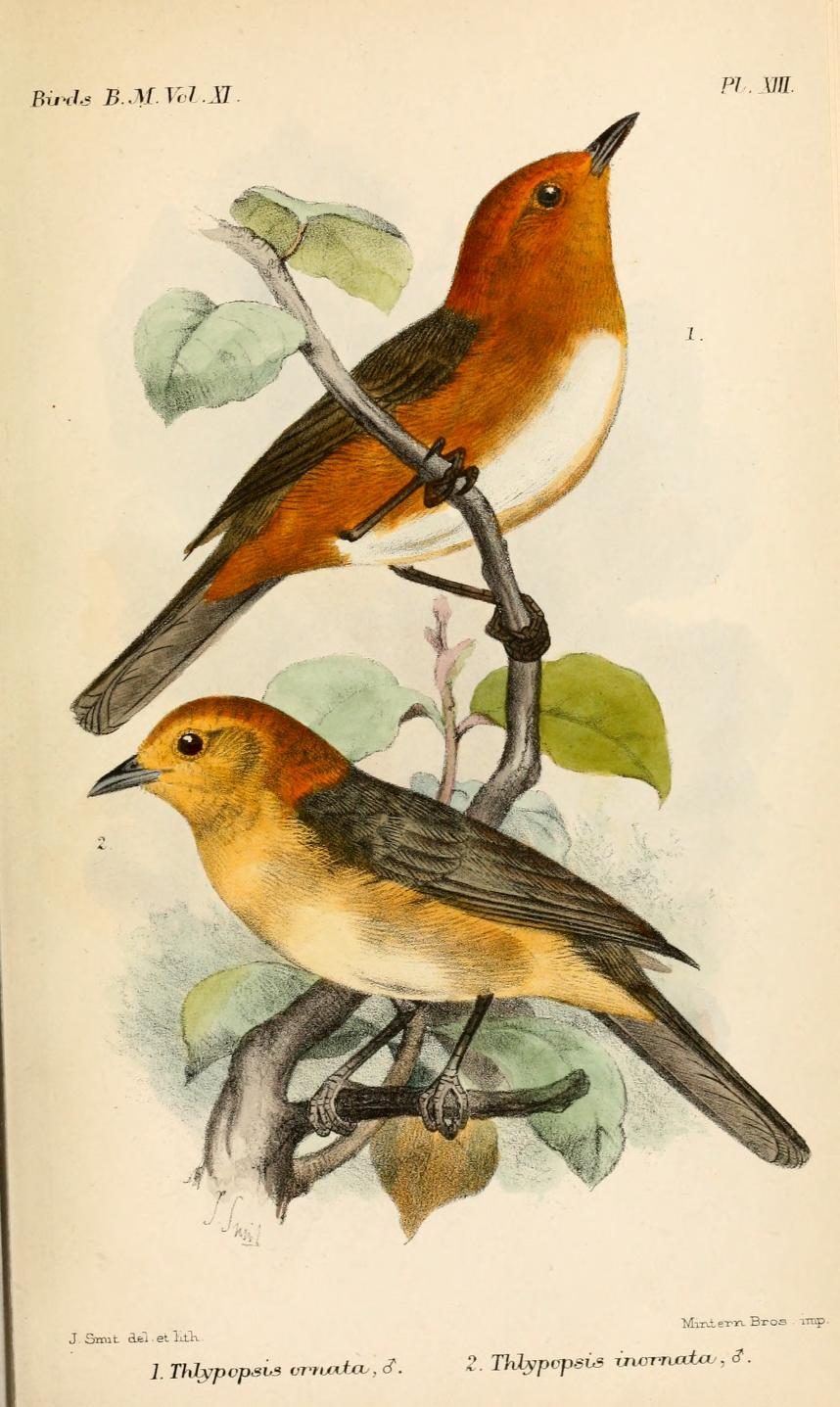
Rufous-chested tanager (above); and buff-bellied tanager (below); illustration by Joseph Smit, 1886

== Description ==
The buff-bellied tanager is 13 to 14 cm (5.1 to 5.5 in) long and weighs 14 to 17 g (0.49 to 0.60 oz). The species is sexually dimorphic. Adult males have a rich dark cinnamon-rufous crown and nape on an otherwise pale orange-buff head and throat. Their back, rump and uppertail coverts are olive-gray. Their upperwing coverts are olive-gray with a brownish tinge and their primary coverts are dusky. Their outer flight feathers are dusky with thin grayish olive edges and the inner ones dusky with brownish edges and an overall brownish tinge. Their tail is olive-gray with a brownish tinge. Their underparts are mostly pale orange-buff with a whitish center to the belly and buff-tinged whitish undertail coverts. Adult females are overall duller than males. They have a cinnamon-tinged olive-gray crown and nape, a strong cinnamon tinge on the ear coverts, and orangish-tinged buff throat and underparts. Both sexes have a dark brown iris, a thin dark gray to blackish bill with often a paler and bluer mandible, and horn-gray legs. Juveniles resemble adult females but with more grayish olive upperparts and more yellowish underparts.

== Distribution and habitat ==
The buff-bellied tanager is found in the basin of the Marañón River from extreme southern Zamora-Chinchipe Province in furthest-south Ecuador into far northwestern Peru's Cajamarca and Amazonas departments. It inhabits semi-arid landscapes including shrublands, the edges and canopy of open forest, scrubby and brushy clearings, and scrubby and brushy bands along watercourses. In elevation it ranges between 650 and 1,200 m (2,100 and 3,900 ft) in Ecuador and between 450 and 2,000 m (1,500 and 6,600 ft) in Peru.

== Behavior ==
=== Movement ===
The buff-bellied tanager is believed to be a year-round resident.

=== Feeding ===
The buff-bellied tanager feeds primarily on small arthropods. It usually forages in pairs or small family groups, at all levels of its scrub/forest habitat and also in adjoining tall grassy areas. It takes prey from clusters of dead leaves and by gleaning from live ones, and it occasionally probes flowers for prey.

=== Breeding ===
Nothing is known about the buff-bellied tanager's breeding biology.

=== Vocalization ===
The buff-bellied tanager's dawn song is "a thin, high ti, sit, seet seet, suueet suueet, seet seet seet, sit sit" that is "high-pitched, leisurely in pace, and somewhat variable". Its calls are "a thin sip or seep" and a soft repeated "seet-a".

== Status ==
The IUCN has assessed the buff-bellied tanager as being of Least Concern. It has a restricted range; its population size is not known but is believed to be stable. No immediate threats have been identified. It has an extremely small Ecuadoran range and is considered uncommon in Peru.
