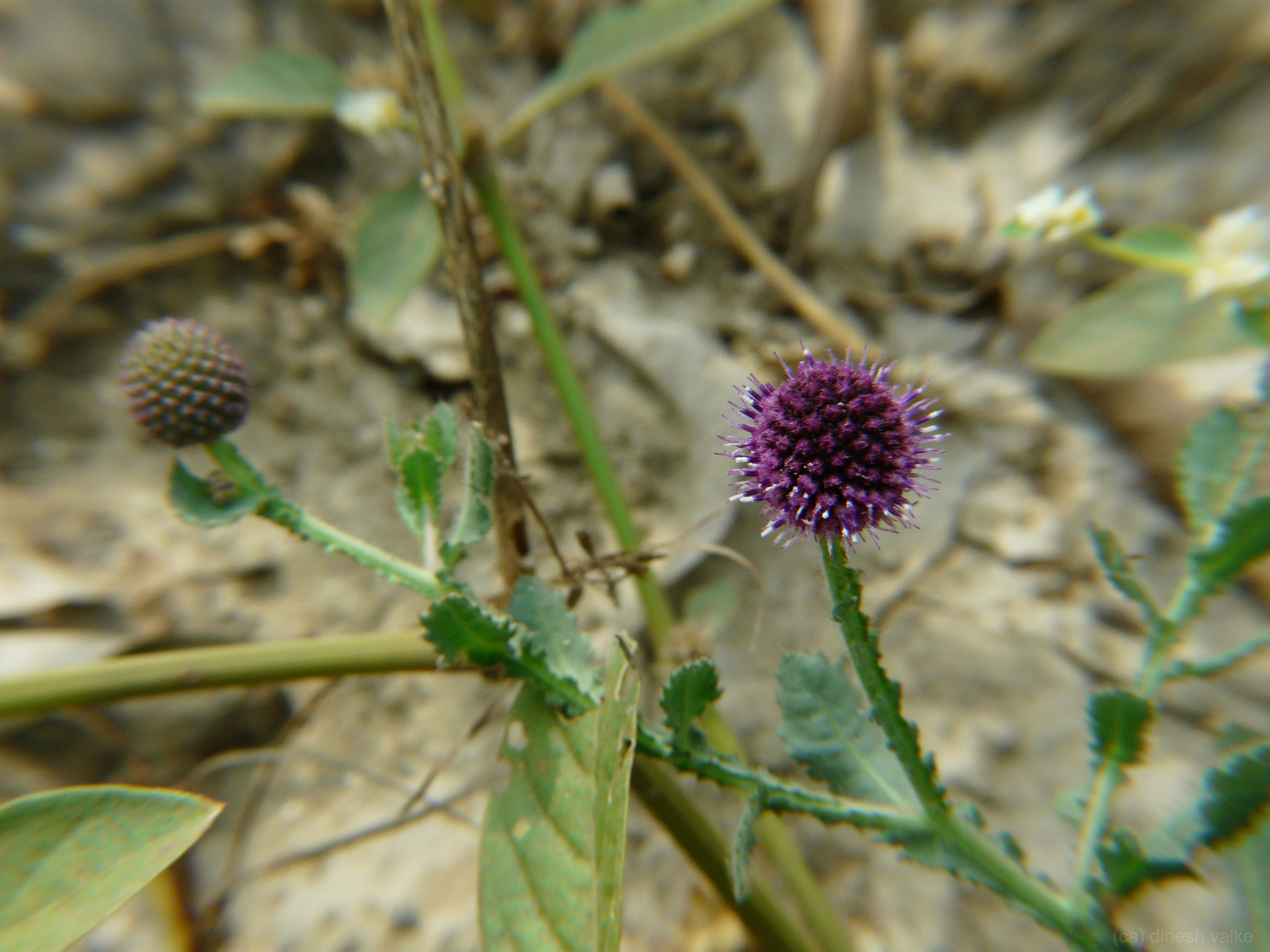
- Sphaeranthus indicus

Scientific classification
- Kingdom: Plantae
- Clade: Tracheophytes
- Clade: Angiosperms
- Clade: Eudicots
- Clade: Asterids
- Order: Asterales
- Family: Asteraceae
- Subfamily: Asteroideae
- Tribe: Inuleae
- Genus: Sphaeranthus; L.

Type species
- Sphaeranthus indicus L.

Synonyms
- Oligolepis Wight; Tisserantia Humbert; Sphaeranthus sect. Eusphaeranthus DC.; Polycephalos Forssk.; Oligolepis Cass. ex DC.

= Sphaeranthus =

Genus of plants

Sphaeranthus is a genus of Asian, African, and Australian plants in the tribe Inuleae within the family Asteraceae.

Species

- Sphaeranthus africanus - Tanzania, Madagascar, Iran, Indian Subcontinent, China, Southeast Asia, northern Australia
- Sphaeranthus amaranthoides - Sri Lanka, Kerala, Tamil Nadu, Karnataka
- Sphaeranthus angolensis - Angola
- Sphaeranthus angustifolius - Madagascar
- Sphaeranthus bullatus - Tanzania
- Sphaeranthus chandleri - Uganda
- Sphaeranthus confertifolius - Kenya
- Sphaeranthus cristatus - Tanzania
- Sphaeranthus epigaeus - South Africa
- Sphaeranthus fischeri - Tanzania
- Sphaeranthus flexuosus - South Africa, Zambia
- Sphaeranthus foliosus
- Sphaeranthus greenwayi - Tanzania
- Sphaeranthus indicus - Indian Subcontinent, China, Southeast Asia, northern Australia
- Sphaeranthus kirkii - Tanzania
- Sphaeranthus mimetes - Tanzania
- Sphaeranthus mozambiquensis - Mozambique
- Sphaeranthus neglectus - South Africa, Madagascar
- Sphaeranthus oppositifolius - Tanzania
- Sphaeranthus peduncularis - South Africa
- Sphaeranthus ramosus - Ethiopia
- Sphaeranthus randii - Zimbabwe, Tanzania
- Sphaeranthus salinarum
- Sphaeranthus samburuensis - Kenya
- Sphaeranthus senegalensis
- Sphaeranthus similis - Angola
- Sphaeranthus spathulatus - Tanzania
- Sphaeranthus steetzii - Ethiopia
- Sphaeranthus strobiliferus - Tanzania
- Sphaeranthus stuhlmannii - Tanzania
- Sphaeranthus suaveolens - Tanzania, Kenya, Burundi
- Sphaeranthus ukambensis - Kenya
- Sphaeranthus wattii - South Africa
- Sphaeranthus zavattarii - Ethiopia

formerly included

several species now in other genera: of Athroisma Pterocaulon

- Sphaeranthus elongatus - Pterocaulon redolens
- Sphaeranthus erectus - Pterocaulon sphacelatum
- Sphaeranthus laciniatus - Athroisma laciniatum
- Sphaeranthus gracilis - Athroisma gracile
