= Kapilasa Wildlife Sanctuary =

Wildlife Sanctuary in Odisha, India

- କପିଳାଷ ବନ୍ୟଜନ୍ତୁ ସଂରକ୍ଷଣାଳୟ
- IUCN category IV (habitat/species management area)
- Location within Odisha Location within India
- Interactive map of Kapilasa Wildlife Sanctuary
- Location: Dhenkanal district, Odisha, India
- Nearest city: Dhenkanal
- Coordinates: 20.7073695°N 85.8017064°E
- Area: 125.5 kilometres (78.0 mi)
- Designated: April 2, 2011
- Governing body: Ministry of Forest and Environment, Government of Odisha

Kapilasa Wildlife Sanctuary or Kapilash Wildlife Sanctuary is situated in Dhenkanal district of Odisha state in India. It is spread across 125.5 km^{2} (48.5 sq mi) in the Chota Nagpur Plateau region. It is classified as an Eastern Highlands moist deciduous forests ecoregion.

== About ==
The wildlife sanctuary got designation on 2 April 2011. It was declared Eco-Sensitive Zone (ESZ) by Ministry of Environment, Forest and Climate Change through draft gazette on 4 July 2014. The extended ESZ area of sanctuary is now 393.87 square kilometres (152.07 sq mi). The ESZ zone impacts total 36 adjoining villages.

== Flora and fauna ==
Sal, is the dominant species of trees in this sanctuary. Other notable flora include Amla, Asan, Bela, Bija, Dhaura, Gmabhari, Jamu, Kadamba, Kanchan, Kangara, Karanja, Kasi, Kendu, Kurum, Kusum, Mahul, Mango, Mundi, Phasi, Sidha, Simul and Teak.

Traces of Lamiaceae were found in the core area of sanctuary.

Important fauna include Asian elephant, Bengal fox, Golden jackal, Gray langur, Indian crested porcupine, Indian giant squirrel, Indian peafowl, Sambar deer, Striped hyena, Wild boar, and various varieties of birds, lizards etc.

== Biological Protection ==
The sanctuary has been a prime subject of multiple protests by wildlife protection groups due to heavy industrialization and government policies that are threatening the biodiversity and ecosystem.

== See also ==
- List of Wildlife sanctuaries of India
- Wildlife of India
- Kapilash Temple
