= Blackroot =

Blackroot may refer to:

- Blackroot, a common name for plants in the genus Pterocaulon
- Blackroot, a translation of Morthond, a river in Middle Earth

== See also ==
Black root
