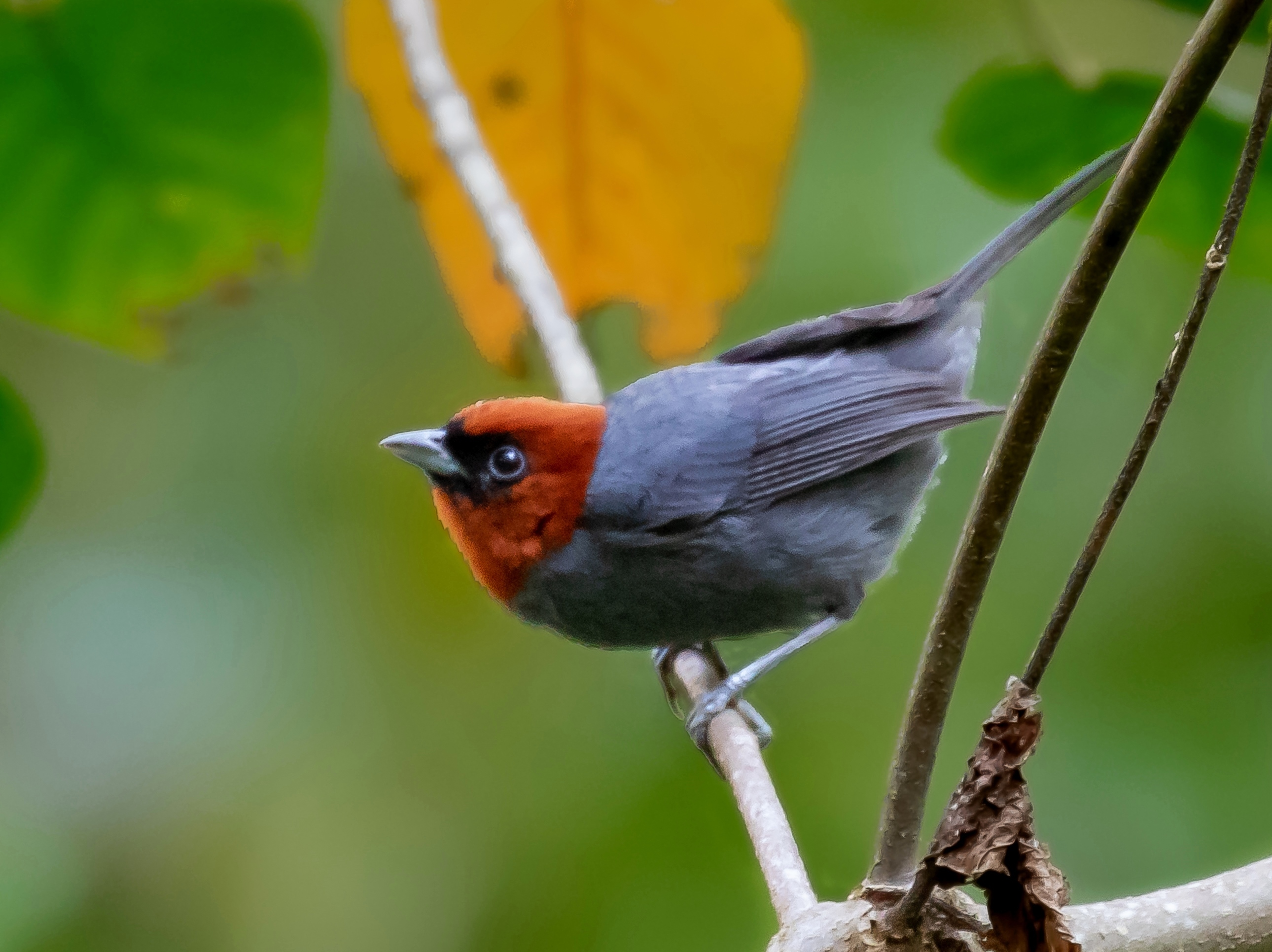
- Male
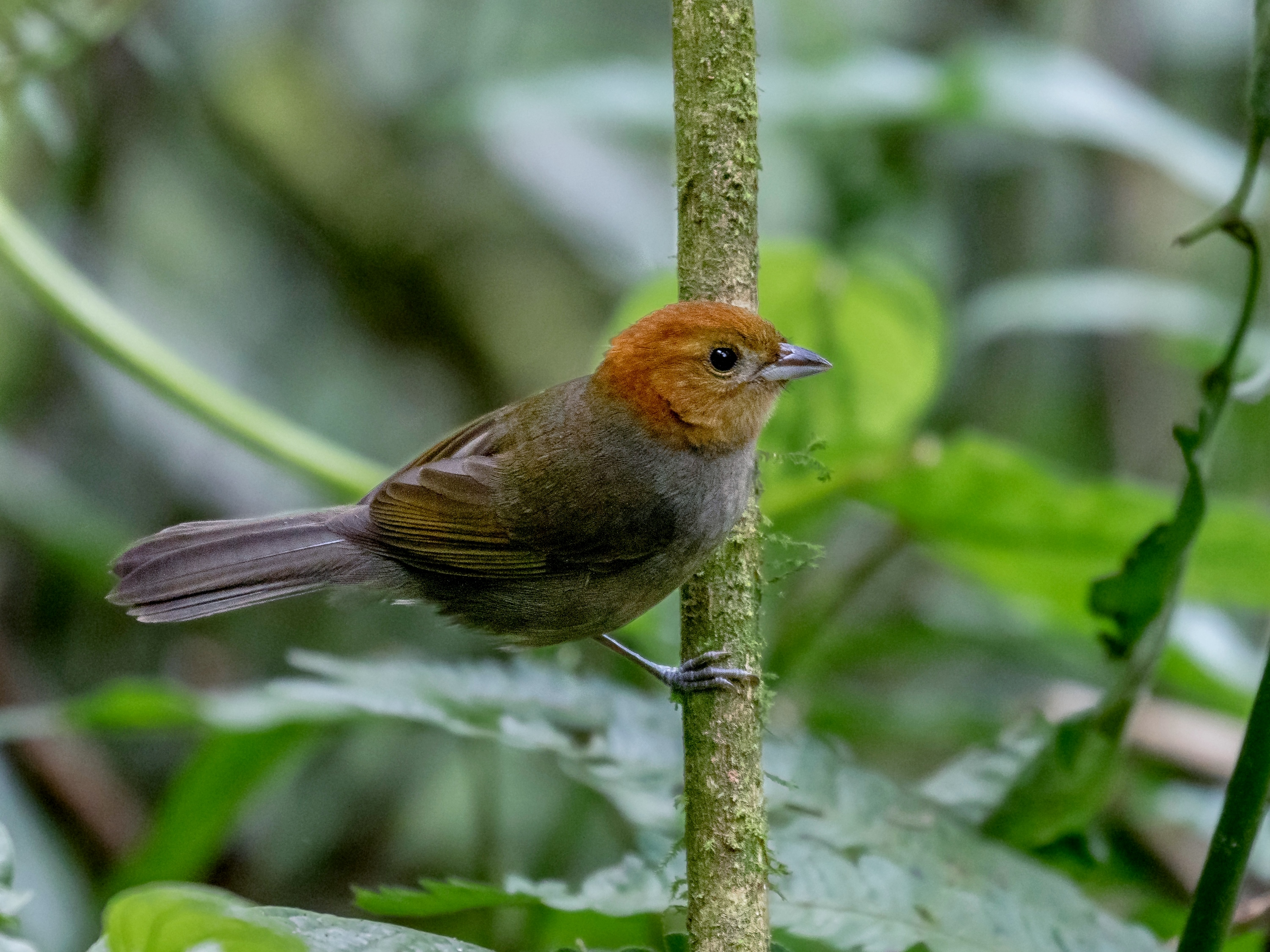
- Female

Conservation status
- Least Concern (IUCN 3.1)

Scientific classification
- Kingdom: Animalia
- Phylum: Chordata
- Class: Aves
- Order: Passeriformes
- Family: Thraupidae
- Genus: Thlypopsis
- Species: T. pyrrhocoma

Binomial name
- Thlypopsis pyrrhocoma Burns, KJ, Unitt & Mason, NA, 2016

Synonyms
- Tachyphonus ruficeps Pyrrhocoma ruficeps

= Chestnut-headed tanager =

Species of bird

The chestnut-headed tanager (Thlypopsis pyrrhocoma) is a species of bird in the family Thraupidae, the tanagers and allies. It is found in Argentina, Brazil, and Paraguay.

== Taxonomy and systematics ==
The chestnut-headed tanager has a somewhat complicated taxonomic history. It was formally described in 1844 by the English naturalist Hugh Edwin Strickland with the binomial Tachyphonus ruficeps. At the time, the genus Tachyphonus was in the family Fringillidae. In 1851 the German ornithologist Jean Cabanis erected a new genus Pyrrhocoma for it and two other species. He retained it in Fringillidae. By 1938 the genus Pyrrhocoma had been reassigned to the tanager family. A molecular phylogenetic study published in 2014 found that the chestnut-headed tanager was embedded in a clade containing members of the genus Thlypopsis. The genera were therefore merged but as Thlypopsis already contained the rust-and-yellow tanager as Thlypopsis ruficeps d'Orbigny & Lafresnaye, 1837, a new specific epithet pyrrhocoma was coined for the chestnut-headed tanager, using the earlier generic name "to communicate past taxonomic connections". The name comes from the Ancient Greek purrhokomēs meaning "red-haired".

The chestnut-headed tanager is monotypic.

== Description ==
The chestnut-headed tanager is about 14 cm (5.5 in) long and weighs an average of 15.6 g (0.55 oz). It is a small, slender tanager with a largish bill. The species is strongly sexually dimorphic. Adult males have an almost entirely dark chestnut head, throat, and neck with a triangular black "mask" from the forehead and chin a little past the eye. Their upperparts, tail, and most of their wing feathers are dark gray. Their upperwing coverts are dusky with wide dark gray edges and their primary coverts blackish. Their underparts are a slightly paler gray than their upperparts with grayish white on the center of the breast and on the belly; the last has little contrast with the rest of the underparts. Adult females are overall duller than males. They have a pale rufous crown and nape, buff lores and chin, and a slightly cinnamon-tinged grayish buff face. Their upperparts, tail, and wings are brownish olive. Their throat and underparts are mostly an olive-tinged grayish buff that is palest on the belly. Both sexes have a dark brown iris, a blackish maxilla, a mostly blue-gray mandible, and dark gray legs. Juveniles are similar to adult females.

== Distribution and habitat ==
The chestnut-headed tanager is found in southeastern Brazil south of a line from western Paraná northeast almost to the Atlantic in Espirito Santo and from the line south to central Rio Grande do Sul. There are also scattered records north of the line. From Brazil its range extends west across northeastern Argentina's Misiones Province and into southeastern Paraguay. It inhabits the undergrowth of forest and shrubby areas along its edges. In Brazil it ranges in elevation from sea level to 1,100 m (3,600 ft).

== Behavior ==
=== Movement ===
The chestnut-headed tanager is generally a year-round resident though some movement inland during the austral winter is suspected.

=== Feeding ===
The chestnut-headed tanager's diet has not been studied but it is known to include insects. It usually forages in pairs or family groups and seldom joins mixed-species feeding flocks. It forages in stands of bamboo and other dense vegetation and seldom more than 3 m (10 ft) above the ground.

=== Breeding ===
The chestnut-headed tanager's eggs are white with some dark spots. Nothing else is known about the species' breeding biology.

=== Vocalization ===
The chestnut-headed tanager usually sings from cover, "3 high sibilant notes followed by 2 or 3 similar but slightly lower ones, e.g. pseee-pseee-pseee, tweee-tweee-tweee". Its calls are "a thin, light tsick and hissing pseee".

== Status ==
The IUCN has assessed the chestnut-headed tanager as being of Least Concern. It has a large range; its population size is not known and is believed to be decreasing. No immediate threats have been identified. It is considered "uncommon to fairly common" overall and "frequent to uncommon" in Brazil. It occurs in one national park in each of Argentina and Paraguay and three in Brazil. However, "relatively little suitable habitat remains outside reserves".
