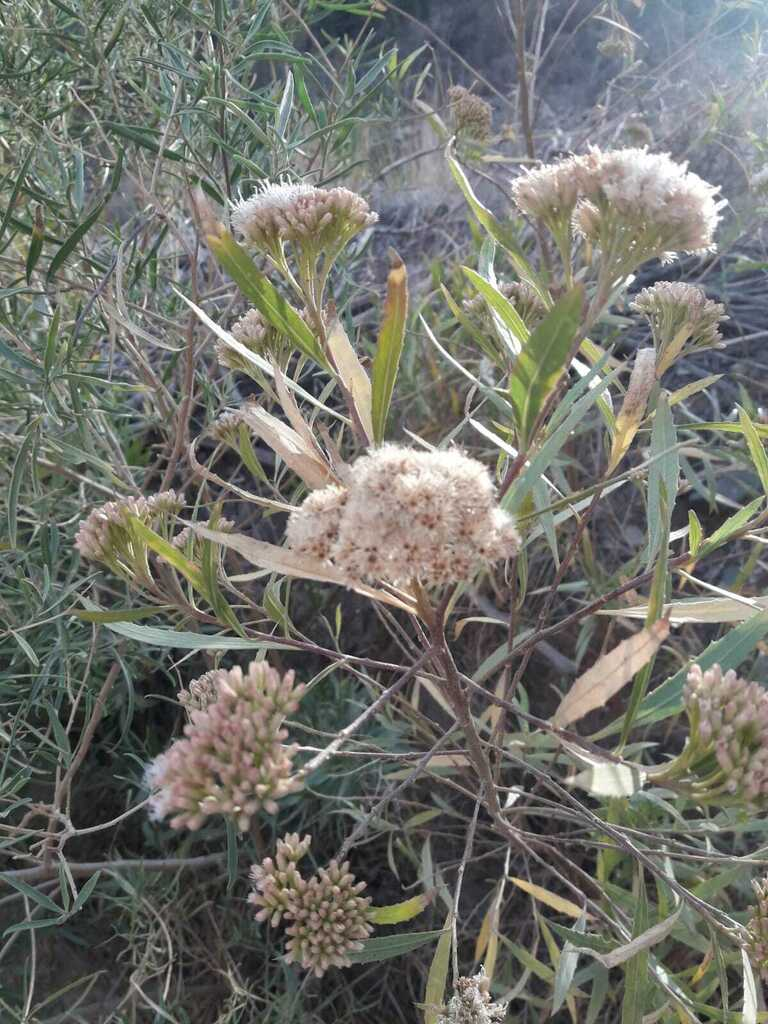

Scientific classification
- Kingdom: Plantae
- Clade: Tracheophytes
- Clade: Angiosperms
- Clade: Eudicots
- Clade: Asterids
- Order: Asterales
- Family: Asteraceae
- Genus: Tessaria
- Species: T. dodonaeifolia

Binomial name
- Tessaria dodonaeifolia (Hook. & Arn.) Cabrera

= Tessaria dodonaeifolia =

Species of flowering plant

Tessaria dodonaeifolia is a species of flowering plant in the family Asteraceae. Vernacular names include chilca, chilca negra, chilca dulce, suncho, suncho dulce, and ka´a he´ê (sweet plant).
