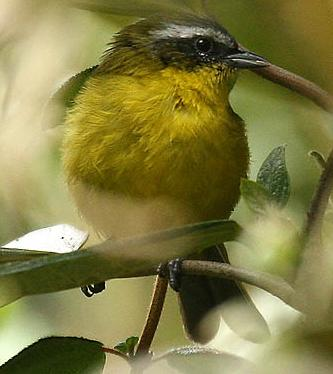

Conservation status
- Least Concern (IUCN 3.1)

Scientific classification
- Kingdom: Animalia
- Phylum: Chordata
- Class: Aves
- Order: Passeriformes
- Family: Thraupidae
- Genus: Thlypopsis
- Species: T. superciliaris

Binomial name
- Thlypopsis superciliaris (Lafresnaye, 1840)

Synonyms
- Arremon superciliaris; Hemispingus superciliaris

= Superciliaried hemispingus =

Species of bird

The superciliaried hemispingus (Thlypopsis superciliaris) is a species of bird in the family Thraupidae, the tanagers and allies. It is found in Bolivia, Colombia, Ecuador, Peru, and Venezuela.

== Taxonomy and systematics ==
The superciliaried hemispingus has a somewhat complicated taxonomic history. It was formally described by the French ornithologist Frédéric de Lafresnaye in 1840 with the binomial Arremon superciliaris. Lafresnaye described the species based on a specimen from "Santa Fe de Bogota", which is current-day Bogotá, Colombia. The specific epithet superciliaris is derived from the Modern Latin and means "eyebrowed". By 1938 the species had been reassigned to the genus Hemispingus in its current family Thraupidae and acquired a second subspecies. By 1970 it had acquired its current seven subspecies. Based largely on a 2016 publication, taxonomic systems transferred H. superciliaris to its present genus Thlypopsis.

The seven subspecies of the superciliaried hemispingus are:

- T. s. chrysophrys (Sclater, PL & Salvin, 1875)
- T. s. superciliaris (Lafresnaye, 1840)
- T. s. nigrifrons (Lawrence, 1875)
- T. s. maculifrons (Zimmer, JT, 1947)
- T. s. insignis (Zimmer, 1947)
- T. s. leucogastra (Taczanowski, 1874)
- T. s. urubambae (Zimmer, 1947)

Plumage differences among the subspecies suggests "that more than one species is involved". However, their vocalizations are very similar. The Clements taxonomy recognizes differences within the species by grouping T. s. superciliaris, T. s. nigrifrons, and T. s. maculifrons as the "superciliaried hemispingus (superciliaried)" and grouping T. s. insignis and T. s. leucogastra as the "superciliaried hemispingus (white-bellied)". It calls T. s. chrysophrys the "superciliaried hemispingus (yellow-browed)" and T. s. urubambae the "superciliaried hemispingus (urubambae).

== Description ==
The superciliaried hemispingus is 13 to 14 cm (5.1 to 5.5 in) long and weighs 11 to 17 g (0.39 to 0.60 oz). The sexes have the same plumage. Adults of the nominate subspecies T. s. superciliaris have a dusky forecrown and cheek, an olive-green mid- and hindcrown, and the long thin white supercilium which gives the species its English name. Their nape, upperparts, upperwing coverts, and tail are olive-green. Their primary coverts are blackish. Their flight feathers are blackish with olive-yellow edges on the outer primaries and olive-green edges on the inner ones. Their throat and underparts are bright yellow with an olive tinge on the flanks. All subspecies have a reddish brown iris, a small slender gray bill, and dark gray legs.

The other subspecies of the superciliaried hemispingus differ from the nominate and each other thus:

- T. s. chrysophrys: olive forecrown, yellow supercilium, and duller cheek than nominate
- T. s. nigrifrons: duskier forecrown and cheek than nominate
- T. s. maculifrons: pale grayish olive forecrown and cheek
- T. s. leucogastra: gray crown, cheek, and upperparts; white supercilium; mostly whitish underparts with dusky mottling on sides of throat, deep gray tinge on breast, and buff tinge on undertail coverts
- T. s. insignis: much like leucogastra but overall paler with faint yellow tinge on undertail coverts
- T. s. urubambae: blackish forecrown, traces of yellow at rear of supercilium, and slightly paler underparts than nominate

== Distribution and habitat ==
The superciliaried hemispingus has a disjunct distribution. The subspecies are found thus:

- T. s. chrysophrys: Venezuelan Andes from Trujillo south to northern Táchira and perhaps beyond
- T. s. superciliaris: Colombia's Eastern Andes, on the eastern slope of Boyacá and Cundinamarca departments and western slope of Santander, Boyacá, and Cundinamarca departments
- T. s. nigrifrons: Colombia's Central Andes on both slopes from Antioquia Department south to Nariño Department and continuing into Ecuador on the western slope to southern Los Rios and Bolívar provinces and on the eastern slope to western Morona-Santiago Province
- T. s. maculifrons: from Azuay Province in southern Ecuador south into northern Peru to the Marañón River in southern Cajamarca Department
- T. s. insignis: eastern slope of Peruvian Andes from Amazonas Department south to Junín Department
- T. s. leucogastra: eastern slope of Peruvian Andes in Junín
- T. s. urubambae: eastern Andean slope from near Vilcabamba in southern Peru's Cuzco Department south into Bolivia to Cochabamba Department

The superciliated hemispingus primarily inhabits the canopy and edges of humid forest; it also occurs in secondary forest, alder (Alnus) stands in landslide scars, and from Ecuador south locally in mature Polylepis woodlands. In Venezuela it ranges in elevation between 1,900 and 3,600 m (6,200 and 11,800 ft) but is mostly found between 2,100 and 3,200 m (6,900 and 10,500 ft). It ranges between 2,200 and 3,400 m (7,200 and 11,200 ft) in Colombia and mostly between 2,400 and 3,200 m (7,900 and 10,500 ft) in Ecuador. In Peru's northwest it is found between 2,200 and 2,900 m (7,200 and 9,500 ft) and on the eastern Andean slope between 2,200 and 3,450 m (7,200 and 11,300 ft).

== Behavior ==
=== Movement ===
The superciliated hemispingus is a year-round resident throughout its range.

=== Feeding ===
The superciliated hemispingus primarily feeds on arthropods but also probably includes small berries and seeds in its diet. It typically forages in pairs and groups of up to about 20 of its species and almost always as part of a mixed-species feeding flock. It takes most prey by gleaning from foliage, occasionally reaching or hanging upside down to capture it. It forages in the canopy throughout the forest and down to the understory at its edges.

=== Breeding ===
The superciliated hemispingus' breeding season in Colombia's Central Andes appears to span at least February to July. Nothing else is known about the species' breeding biology.

=== Vocalization ===
One description of the superciliated hemispingus' song is "an accelerating and rather loud series of jumbled notes, sometimes given by several birds at once". Its call is "a harsh chatter whose pitch often drops in [the] middle, then recovers". Its song is also described as "a rapid, dry, chippering chatter" and a call as "a high ti".

== Status ==
The IUCN has assessed the superciliated hemispingus as being of Least Concern. It has an extremely large range; its population size is not known and is believed to be decreasing. No immediate threats have been identified. It is considered fairly common to common in Venezuela and fairly common in Colombia and Peru. "Increasing human colonization and wood-cutting at high elevations an ongoing concern, but this species should be able to survive in various older-age stages of second growth and forested borders."
