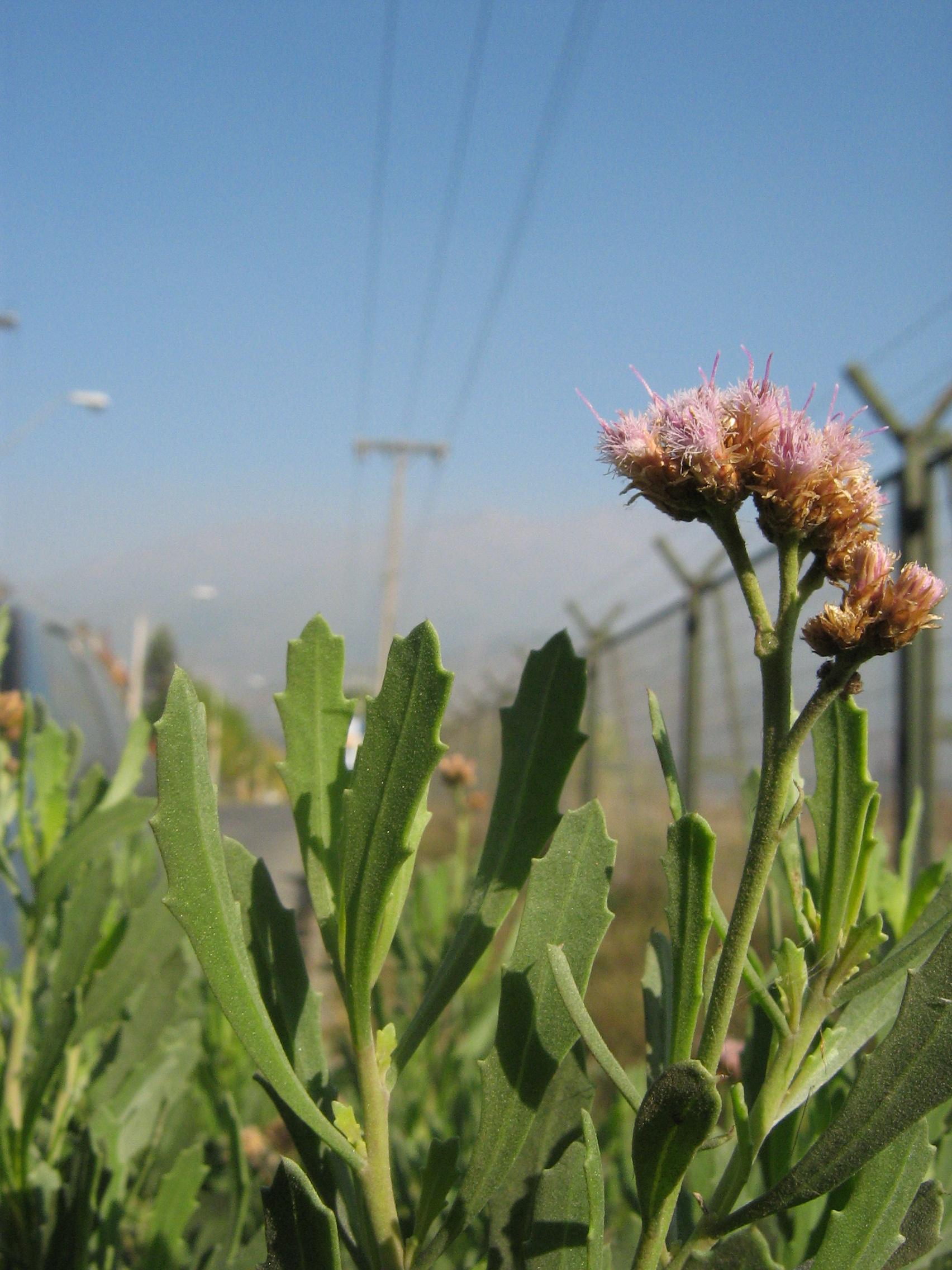

Scientific classification
- Kingdom: Plantae
- Clade: Embryophytes
- Clade: Tracheophytes
- Clade: Spermatophytes
- Clade: Angiosperms
- Clade: Eudicots
- Clade: Asterids
- Order: Asterales
- Family: Asteraceae
- Genus: Tessaria
- Species: T. absinthioides

Binomial name
- Tessaria absinthioides (Hook. & Arn.) DC.

= Tessaria absinthioides =

Species of flowering plant

Tessaria absinthioides is a halophytic species of flowering plant in the family Asteraceae.

While it prefers to grow along river beds, it is extremely adaptable to many different environments, the most notable being the Atacama Desert. Here, in the Pampa del Tamarugal, the plant gains moisture almost exclusively through fog.

It is also known as a compass plant.
