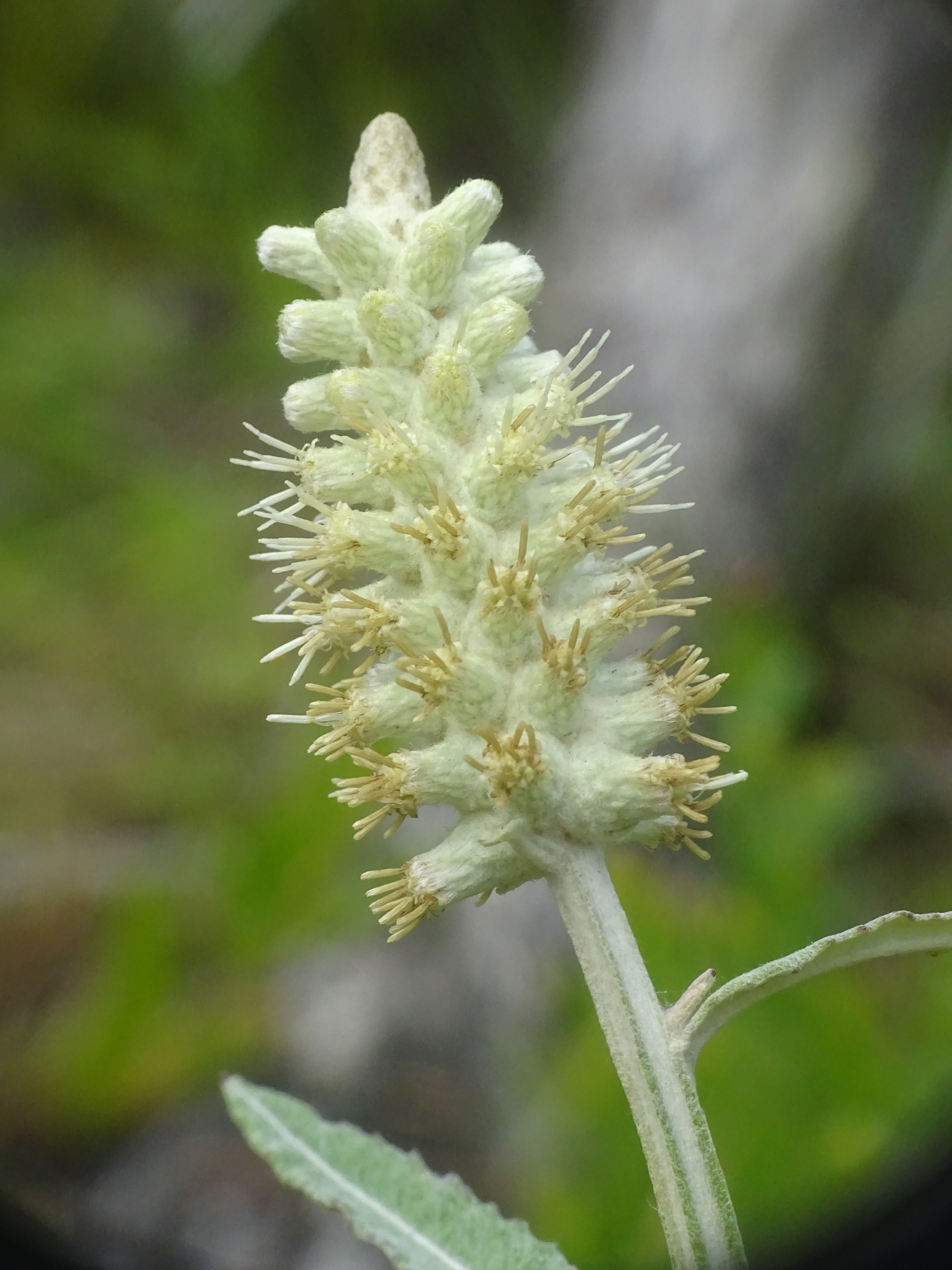

Conservation status
- Secure (NatureServe)

Scientific classification
- Kingdom: Plantae
- Clade: Tracheophytes
- Clade: Angiosperms
- Clade: Eudicots
- Clade: Asterids
- Order: Asterales
- Family: Asteraceae
- Genus: Pterocaulon
- Species: P. pycnostachyum

Binomial name
- Pterocaulon pycnostachyum (Michx.) Elliott

Synonyms
- Chlaenobolus pycnostachyum (Michx.) Cass.; Chlaenobolus spicatus Cass.; Conyza pycnostachya Michx.; Gnaphalium undulatum Walter; Pterocaulon undulatum C. Mohr

= Pterocaulon pycnostachyum =

Species of plant

Pterocaulon pycnostachyum, with the common names dense-spike blackroot, fox-tail blackroot or coastal blackroot, is a flowering plant species native to the U.S. southeast coastal plain in the states of Alabama, Mississippi, North Carolina, Florida, Georgia, and South Carolina. It can be found in pinelands, ditches, depressions, and fields.

== Description ==
Pterocaulon pycnostachyum is a perennial herb up to 80 cm (31 inches) tall. Stems and the underside of leaves are covered with a thick, white layer of woolly hairs. Flower heads are crowded into a densely packed spike at the tips of the branches. Each head has as many as 50 small yellowish flowers. The plant is monoecious, meaning that some of the flowers have male stamens, while female pistils are in separate flowers in the same head.
