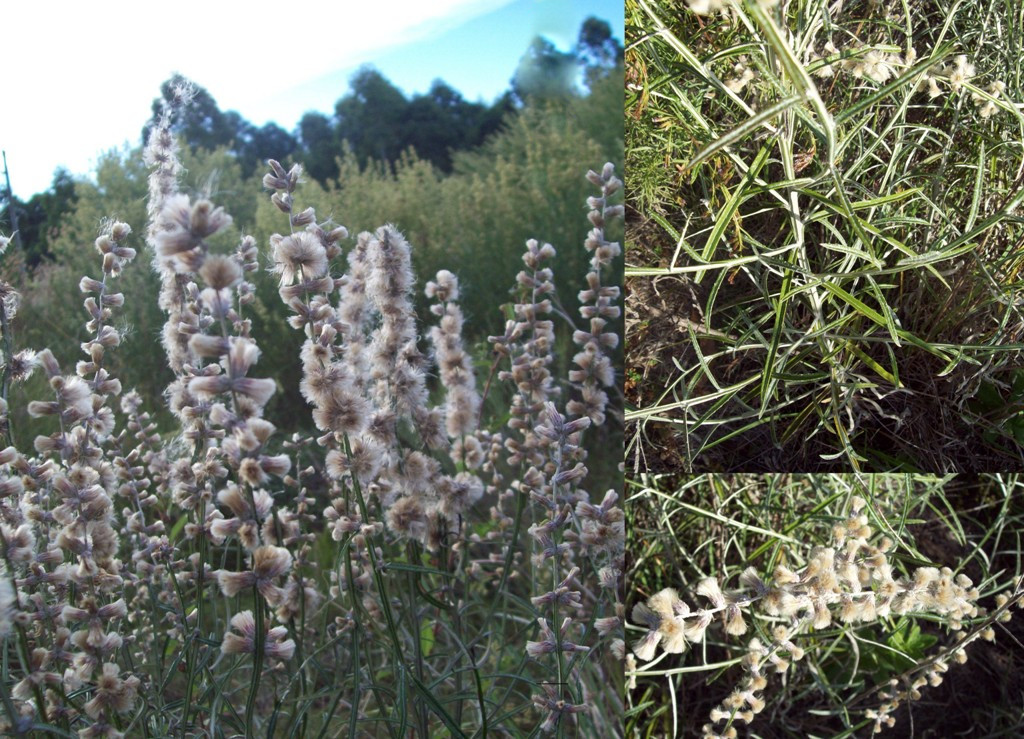

Scientific classification
- Kingdom: Plantae
- Clade: Tracheophytes
- Clade: Angiosperms
- Clade: Eudicots
- Clade: Asterids
- Order: Asterales
- Family: Asteraceae
- Genus: Pterocaulon
- Species: P. virgatum

Binomial name
- Pterocaulon virgatum (L.) DC.

Synonyms
- Baccharis virgata DC.; Chlaenobolus virgata (L.) Cass.; Conyza alopecuroides Lam.; Conyza polystachya Michx.; Conyza rugosa Vahl; Conyza virgata (L.) L.; Conyza virgata DC. (illegitimate); Gnaphalium decurrens Schrank; Gnaphalium spicatum Mill.; Gnaphalium undulatum L.; Gnaphalium virgatum L.; Pterocaulon alopecuroides (Lam.) DC.; Pterocaulon pilcomayense Malme; Pterocaulon pompilianum Standl. & L.O.Williams; Pterocaulon subspicatum Malme ex Chodat; Pterocaulon subvirgatum Malme; Pterocaulon undulatum C. Mohr; Pterocaulon virgatum fo. alopecuroides (Lam.) Arechav.; Pterocaulon virgatum f. subvirgata (Malme) Arechav.

= Pterocaulon virgatum =

Species of plant

Pterocaulon virgatum, common name wand blackroot, is a plant species widespread in Latin America and in the West Indies. In the contiguous United States, it has been reported only from Texas and Louisiana. It grows in marshy areas, ditches, sandy loam, etc.

Pterocaulon virgatum is a perennial herb up to 150 cm (60 inches) tall. Leaves are alternate, narrowly linear, green above, white with dense woolly hairs below. Flower heads are arranged in spikes at the ends of branches. There are no ray flowers, only 25-50 yellow disc flowers per head.

== Historical uses ==
According to James Mooney, the Cherokee Indians made use of the plant in their sweat baths for various diseases and it was considered one of their most valuable medicinal plants.
