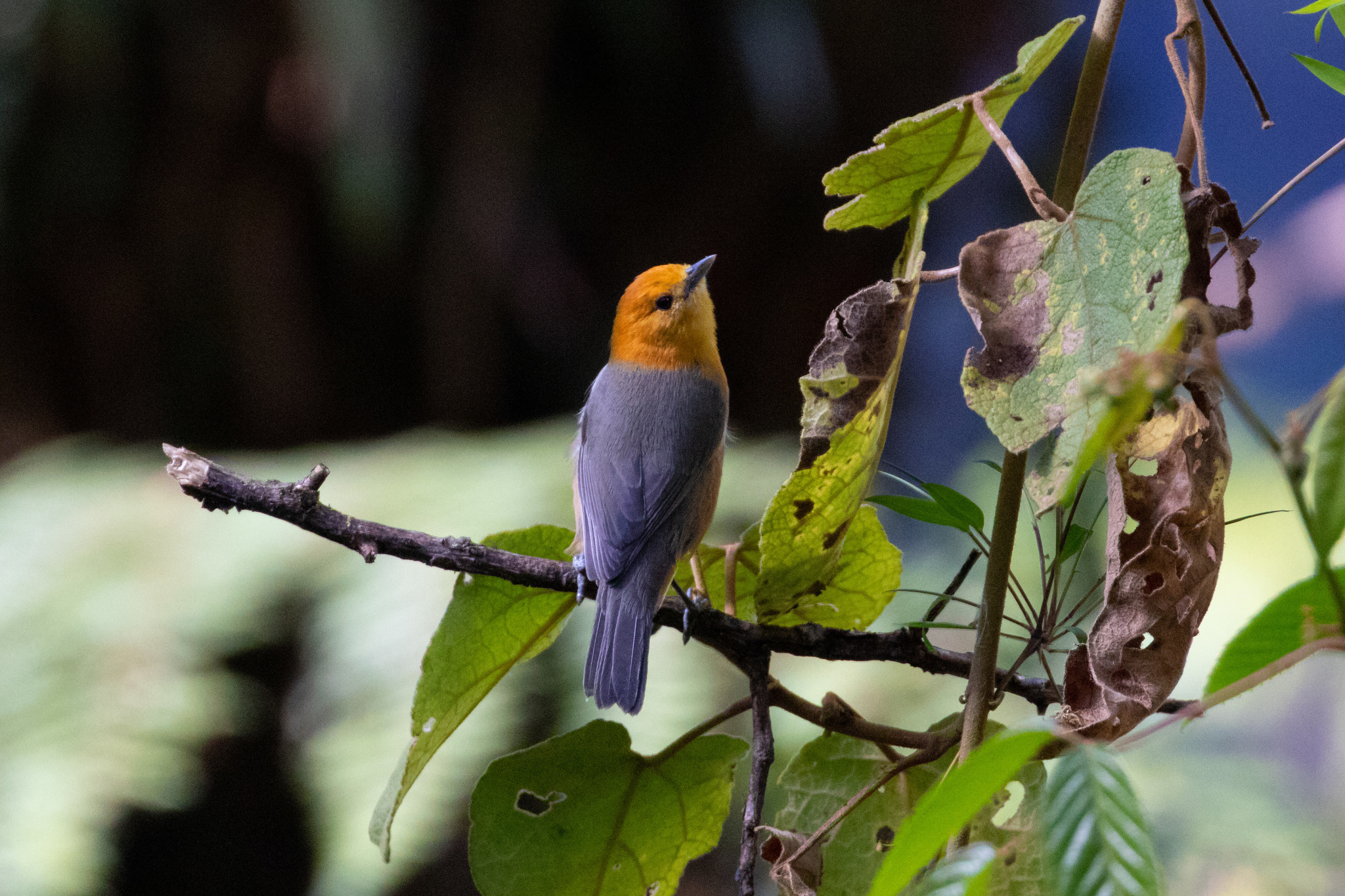

Conservation status
- Least Concern (IUCN 3.1)

Scientific classification
- Kingdom: Animalia
- Phylum: Chordata
- Class: Aves
- Order: Passeriformes
- Family: Thraupidae
- Genus: Thlypopsis
- Species: T. ornata

Binomial name
- Thlypopsis ornata (Sclater, PL, 1859)

= Rufous-chested tanager =

Species of bird

The rufous-chested tanager (Thlypopsis ornata) is a species of bird in the family Thraupidae, the tanagers and allies. It is found in Colombia, Ecuador, and Peru.

== Taxonomy and systematics ==
The rufous-chested tanager was formally described in 1859 with the binomial Nemosia ornata. By 1938 the species had been reassigned to its present genus Thlypopsis and acquired its three subspecies. It and the brown-flanked tanager (T. pectoralis) are sister species.

The rufous-chested tanager's subspecies are:

- T. o. ornata (Sclater, PL, 1859)
- T. o. media Zimmer, JT, 1930
- T. o. macropteryx Berlepsch & Stolzmann, 1896

== Description ==
The rufous-chested tanager is 12 to 13 cm (4.7 to 5.1 in) long and weighs 10 to 15 g (0.35 to 0.53 oz). It is a small tanager with a thin bill. The species is sexually dimorphic but not dramatically so. Adult males of the nominate subspecies T. o. ornata have an entirely deep orange-rufous head, throat, neck, upper breast, flanks, and undertail coverts. The color is somewhat richer on their crown and slightly paler on the throat. Their upperparts, upperwing coverts, and tail are brownish gray with a sharp contrast between the nape and mantle. Their primary coverts are dusky and their flight feathers dusky with dull gray edges. The center of their lower breast and their belly are white. Adult females are similar to males but have a paler and somewhat olive crown and nape that do not greatly contrast with the back. Their underparts are paler than the male's. Subspecies T. o. media is slightly larger than the nominate but otherwise the same. T. o. macropteryx is also larger than the nominate and has a darker crown, a deeper and richer orange-rufous on the throat and breast, and more white on the belly. All subspecies have a dark brown iris, a dusky bill, and dark gray legs.

== Distribution and habitat ==
The nominate subspecies of the rufous-chested tanager is the northernmost. It is found along the western slope of Colombia's Western Andes from Cauca Department south into Ecuador on both slopes of the Andes to far southern Azuay Province. Subspecies T. o. media is found from the southernmost Ecuadoran provinces of El Oro, Loja and Zamora-Chinchipe south into Peru, on both slopes of the Andes in the far northwest continuing on the western slope to Lima Department and the eastern slope to Pasco Department. T. o. macropteryx is found primarily in Junín Department with some isolated records further south.

The rufous-chested tanager primarily inhabits the edges of somewhat dry montane forest, especially scrubby second growth, and also more isolated shrubby areas and wooded ravines. It occasionally also is found in Polylepis woodland. In elevation it ranges between 2,000 and 3,400 m (6,600 and 11,200 ft) in Colombia, mostly between 1,800 and 3,000 m (5,900 and 9,800 ft) in Eucador, and mostly between 1,600 and 3,300 m (5,200 and 10,800 ft) in but locally to 3,800 m (12,500 ft) in Peru.

== Behavior ==
=== Movement ===
The rufous-chested tanager is believed to be a year-round resident.

=== Feeding ===
The rufous-chested tanager feeds primarily on insects and other arthropods like spiders. It forages singly, in pairs, and in family groups and sometimes joins mixed-species feeding flocks. It forages from about eye level to the tops of its habitat, gleaning prey from twigs and live and dead leaves and sometimes flowers. It active and sometimes acrobatic, hanging upside down to capture prey.

=== Breeding ===
The rufous-chested tanager apparently breeds between at least February and May in Ecuador. There a nest was a small cup made from coarse grass, twigs, and other plant matter lined with finer grass. Nests were found between about 0.4 and 1.2 m (1 and 4 ft) above the ground in grass and small bushes. The clutch is two eggs that are white with red-brown markings. The incubation period, time to fledging, and details of parental care are not known.

=== Vocalization ===
The rufous-chested tanager's song is "a simple series of high swee notes" and its calls "high tsit and tip notes".

== Status ==
The IUCN has assessed the rufous-chested tanager as being of Least Concern. It has a large range; its population size is not known and is believed to be decreasing. No immediate threats have been identified. It is considered "local and uncommon" in Colombia, "scarce...[but] more numerous in the south" in Ecuador, and "fairly common" in Peru. It "tolerates highly degraded second growth and scrub, even along steep ravines, but near-complete deforestation and conversion to pastureland of much of this species’ formerly wooded range poses a significant long-term risk."
