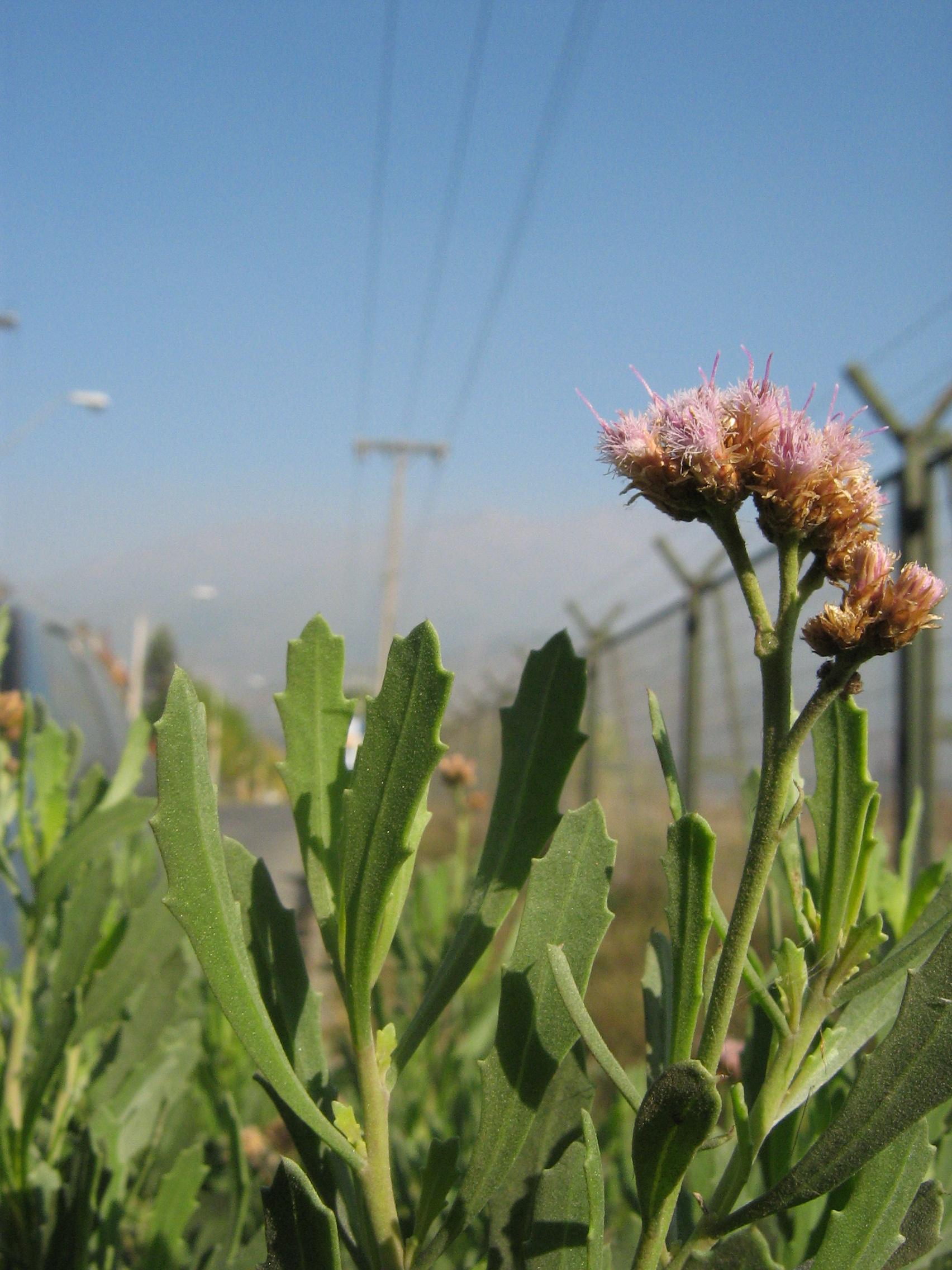
- Tessaria absinthioides

Scientific classification
- Kingdom: Plantae
- Clade: Tracheophytes
- Clade: Angiosperms
- Clade: Eudicots
- Clade: Asterids
- Order: Asterales
- Family: Asteraceae
- Subfamily: Asteroideae
- Tribe: Inuleae
- Genus: Tessaria; Ruiz & Pav.

Type species
- Tessaria integrifolia Ruiz & Pav.

Synonyms
- Phalacromesus Cass.; Polypappus Nutt.; Monophalacrus Cass.; Gynheteria Willd.

= Tessaria =

Genus of plants

Tessaria is a genus of South American plants in the tribe Inuleae within the family Asteraceae.

Species

- Tessaria integrifolia Ruiz & Pav. - Panamá, Colombia, Ecuador, Peru, Bolivia, Argentina, Paraguay, Brazil, Venezuela,
- Tessaria absinthioides (Hook. & Arn.) DC. - Chile, Argentina, Uruguay, Paraguay, Brazil
- Tessaria fastigiata (Griseb.) Cabrera - Bolivia, Paraguay, Argentina
- Tessaria andina M.Monge, Anderb. & Semir - Bolivia
- Tessaria dodonaeifolia (Hook. & Arn.) Cabrera - Argentina, Bolivia, Paraguay, Uruguay

formerly included

several species now considered members of Pluchea or Pterocaulon
