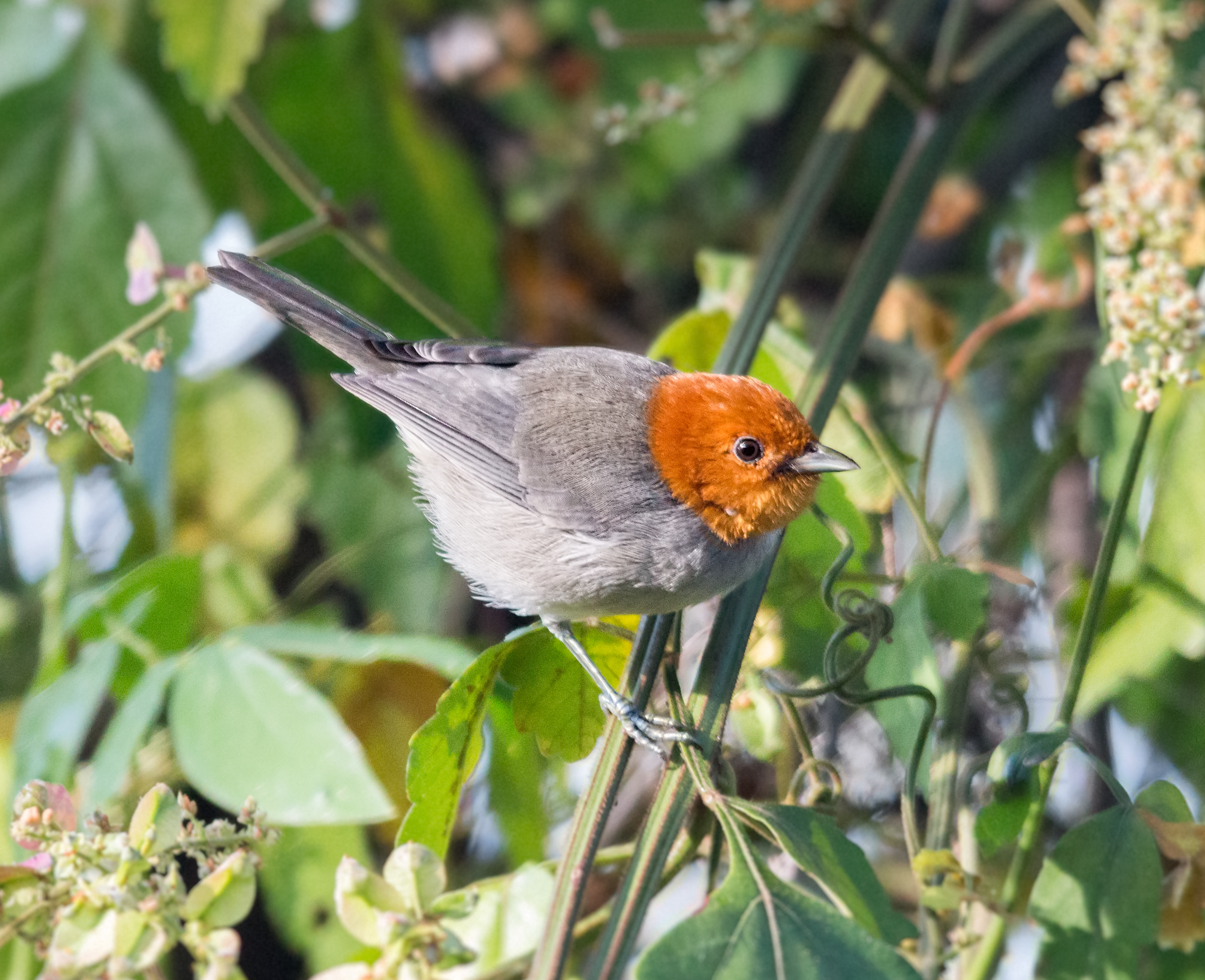

Conservation status
- Least Concern (IUCN 3.1)

Scientific classification
- Kingdom: Animalia
- Phylum: Chordata
- Class: Aves
- Order: Passeriformes
- Family: Thraupidae
- Genus: Thlypopsis
- Species: T. fulviceps

Binomial name
- Thlypopsis fulviceps Cabanis, 1851

= Fulvous-headed tanager =

Species of bird

The fulvous-headed tanager (Thlypopsis fulviceps) is a species of bird in the family Thraupidae, the tanagers and allies. It is found in Colombia and Venezuela.

== Taxonomy and systematics ==
The fulvous-headed tanager was formally described in 1851 by the German ornithologist Jean Cabanis with its current binomial Thlypopsis fulviceps. Cabanis stated the type locality as "Caraccas", to which in 1970 Paynter added "[, Venezuela]".

The specific epithet fulviceps is derived from Latin words meaning "tawny-headed".

The fulvous-headed tanager has these four subspecies:

- T. f. fulviceps Cabanis, 1851
- T. f. obscuriceps Phelps, WH & Phelps, WH Jr, 1953
- T. f. meridensis Phelps WH & Phelps, WH Jr, 1962
- T. f. intensa Todd, 1917

== Description ==
The fulvous-headed tanager is about 12 cm (4.7 in) long and weighs 11 to 13 g (0.39 to 0.46 oz). It is a small tanager with a thin bill. The species is slightly sexually dimorphic. Adult males of the nominate subspecies T. f. fulviceps have a rufous-chestnut head, nape, and throat, though the throat is slightly paler than the rest. Their upperparts, upperwing coverts, and tail are gray. Their primary coverts are dusky and their flight feathers dusky with gray edges. Their underparts are mostly light gray with a whitish center to the belly and whitish undertail coverts. Females have a paler, more rufous-buff throat than males, but are otherwise the same. Subspecies T. f. obscuriceps has slightly darker gray upperparts than the nominate. T. f. meridensis has paler underparts than the nominate with a gray tinge on the undertail coverts. T. f. intensa has a darker chestnut head than the other three subspecies and also cinnamon undertail coverts. All subspecies have a dark brown iris, a grayish bill with a paler base to the mandible, and horn-gray legs.

== Distribution and habitat ==
The fulvous-headed tanager has a disjunct distribution. Each subspecies is separate from the others and the nominate also has a gap in its range. The subspecies are found thus:

- T. f. fulviceps: Venezuelan Coastal Ranges from Carabobo and northern Guárico states east to the Capital District and Miranda state and further east in Anzoátegui, western Sucre, and northern Monagas states
- T. f. obscuriceps: Serranía del Perijá straddling the Colombia-Venezuela border (and see below)
- T. f. meridensis: eastern slope of the Venezuelan Andes from northeastern Táchira state north to Lara state
- T. f. intensa: eastern slope of Colombia's Eastern Andes in Norte de Santander Department

An isolated population on the western slope of the Sierra Nevada de Santa Marta in northern Colombia is believed to belong to T. f. obscuriceps.

The fulvous-headed tanager primarily inhabits semi-humid forest including secondary woodlands; it occurs in lesser numbers in more humid forest and also is known from shrubby gardens in Caracas and other urban areas. In forest it favors areas of the canopy and forest edges that are heavy with vines. In Colombia it ranges in elevation from 1,600 to 2,300 m (5,200 to 7,500 ft) and in Venezuela from 800 to 1,900 m (2,600 to 6,200 ft).

== Behavior ==
=== Movement ===
The fulvous-headed tanager is believed to be a year-round resident.

=== Feeding ===
The fulvous-headed tanager feeds primarily on larval and adult insects and includes small amounts of berries in its diet. It typically forages singly, in pairs, or in small groups that might be families, and regularly joins mixed-species feeding flocks. It forages in the forest canopy and at all levels at the forest edge. It takes most prey from leaves, both dead clusters and live ones, by gleaning and reaching while perched. It often is acrobatic, hanging sideways or upside down to reach prey. It sometimes makes a short flight to reach the underside of leaves.

=== Breeding ===
The breeding season of the fulvous-headed tanager has not been determined but includes April in the Serranía del Perijá and November in Norte de Santander. Nothing else is known about the species' breeding biology.

=== Vocalization ===
The fulvous-headed tanager sings in the morning, but infrequently. Its song is "a high chi chi cht-cht-tit-t-t-t-t-t-t, accelerating and trailing off". Its calls include "insignificant, high tsit and chik notes". It also makes "rapid chip and tsitt notes when excited".

== Status ==
The IUCN has assessed the fulvous-headed tanager as being of Least Concern. It has a large range; its population size is not known and is believed to be decreasing. No immediate threats have been identified. It is considered uncommon in Colombia and uncommon to locally fairly common in Venezuela. It occurs in two national parks in Venezuela. "Deforestation, fires and human colonization have resulted in loss of at least half of the species’ habitat within its range, which has consequently contracted."
