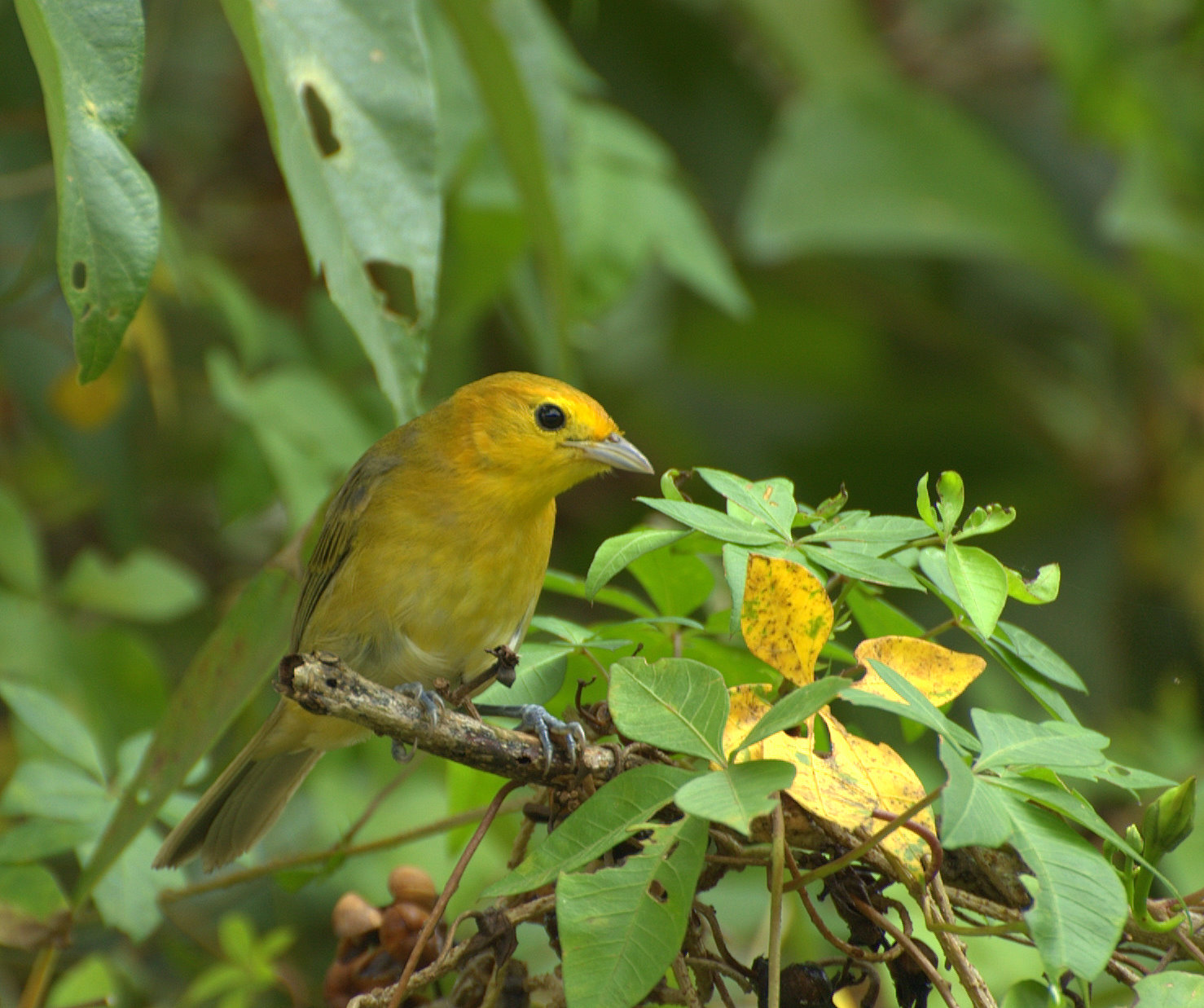
- Female of nominate subspecies
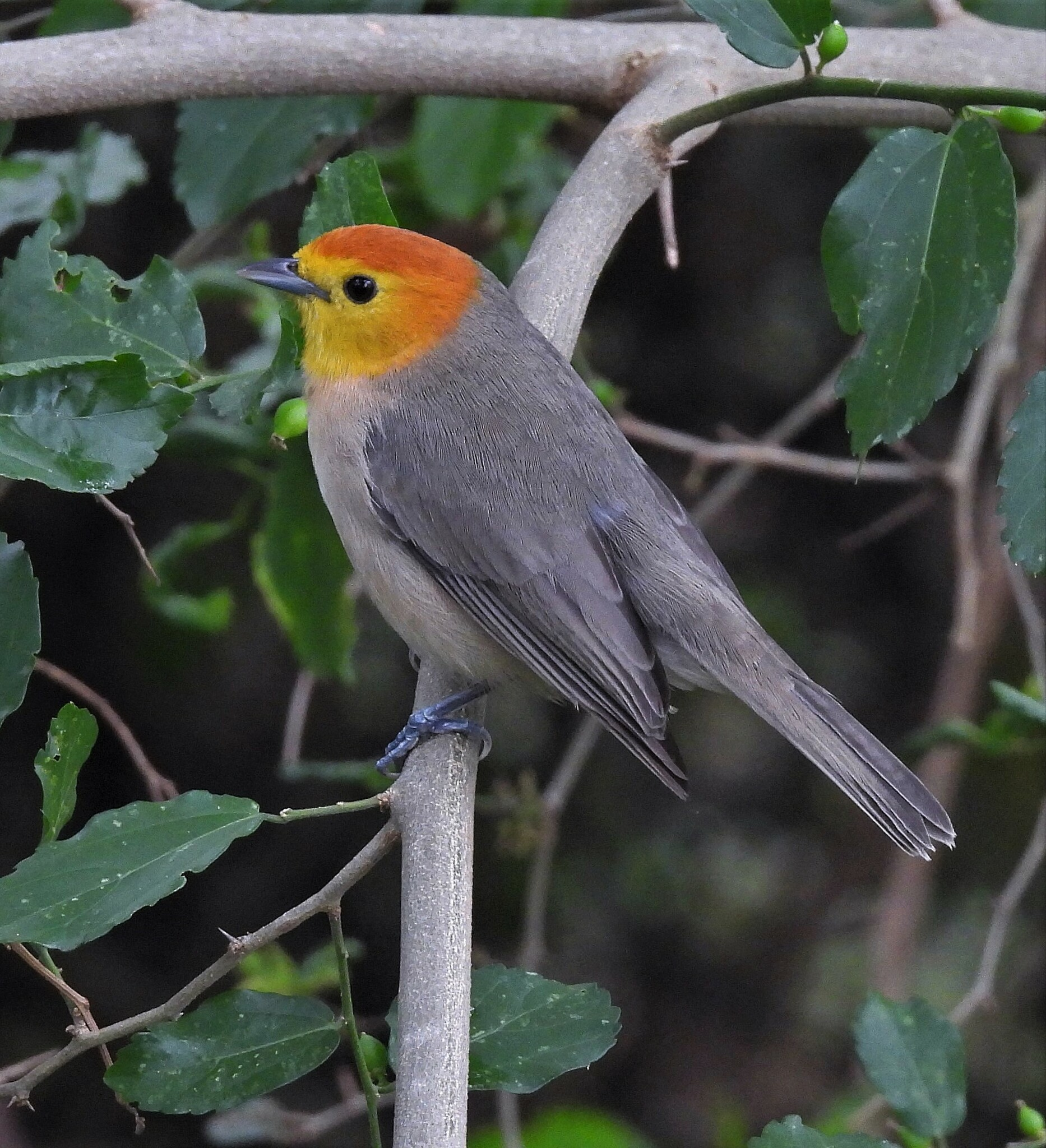
- Male of nominate subspecies

Conservation status
- Least Concern (IUCN 3.1)

Scientific classification
- Kingdom: Animalia
- Phylum: Chordata
- Class: Aves
- Order: Passeriformes
- Family: Thraupidae
- Genus: Thlypopsis
- Species: T. sordida

Binomial name
- Thlypopsis sordida (d'Orbigny & Lafresnaye, 1837)

Synonyms
- Nemosia sordida d'Orbigny & Lafresnaye, 1837; Nemosia chrysopis Sclater & Salvin, 1880

= Orange-headed tanager =

Species of bird from South America

The orange-headed tanager (Thlypopsis sordida) is a species of bird in the family Thraupidae. Native to South America, it is found in Argentina, Bolivia, Brazil, Colombia, Ecuador, Paraguay, Peru, and Venezuela, where it inhabits successional vegetation, cerrado, riparian forest, shrub, brush, and open woodland. Males of the species have sandy-gray upperparts, cinnamon to buff underparts, white on the center of the lower breast, belly, and tail, and rufous-orange and yellow heads. Females are similar but duller.

The orange-headed tanager is omnivorous, feeding on insects, spiders, fruit, and seeds. It forages in an active manner, gleaning prey while hopping or, more infrequently, catching it in flight. Nesting has been recorded in December, and clutches contain two bluish-white eggs with brown markings. The species is listed as being of least concern by the International Union for Conservation of Nature (IUCN) on the IUCN Red List due to its large range and stable population.

== Taxonomy and systematics ==
The orange-headed tanager was originally described in 1837 as Nemosia sordida by the French ornithologists Frédéric de Lafresnaye and Alcide d'Orbigny on the basis of specimens from Bolivia. It was then moved to the genus Thlypopsis, of which it is the type species, by the German ornithologist Jean Cabanis in 1851. The name of the genus, Thlypopsis, is from the Ancient Greek thlupis, a word for an unknown species of small bird, and opsis, meaning appearance. The specific name sordida is from the Latin sordidus, meaning dirty or shabby. Orange-headed tanager is the official common name designated by the International Ornithologists' Union.

=== Subspecies ===
There are three recognized subspecies of the orange-headed tanager:

- T. s. sordida (Lafresnaye and d'Orbigny, 1837): The nominate subspecies, it is found from eastern Bolivia to Brazil, south to Paraguay and northern Argentina.
- T. s. chrysopis (Sclater and Salvin, 1880): Originally described as a separate species, it is found in southern Colombia, eastern Ecuador and Peru, and western Brazil. It differs from the nominate in having pure gray underparts and light grayish-brown sides and breasts.
- T. s. orinocensis Friedmann, 1942: It is found in central Venezuela. It has pale gray upperparts tinged grayish-cinnamon.
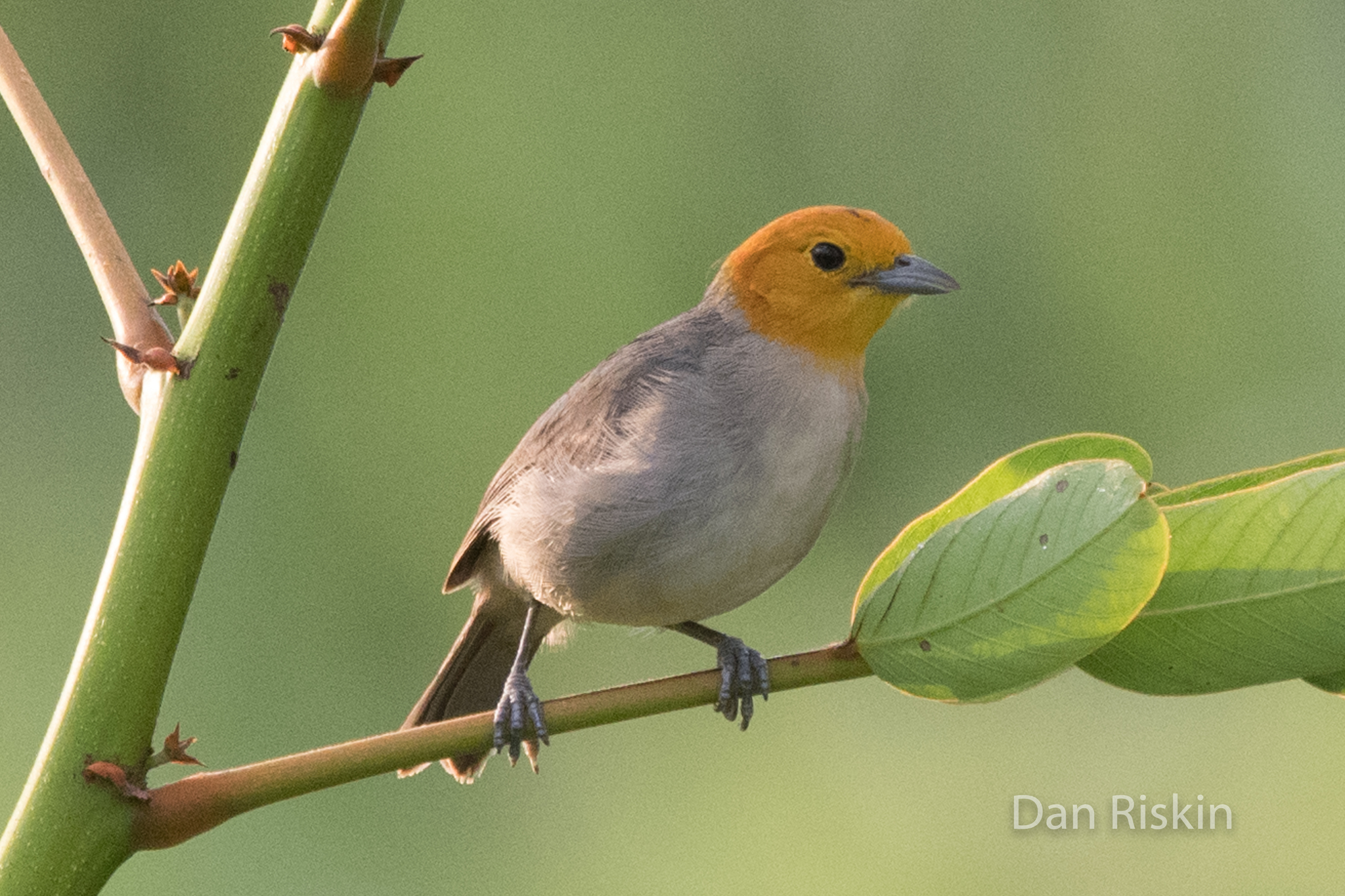
T. s. chrysopis

== Description ==
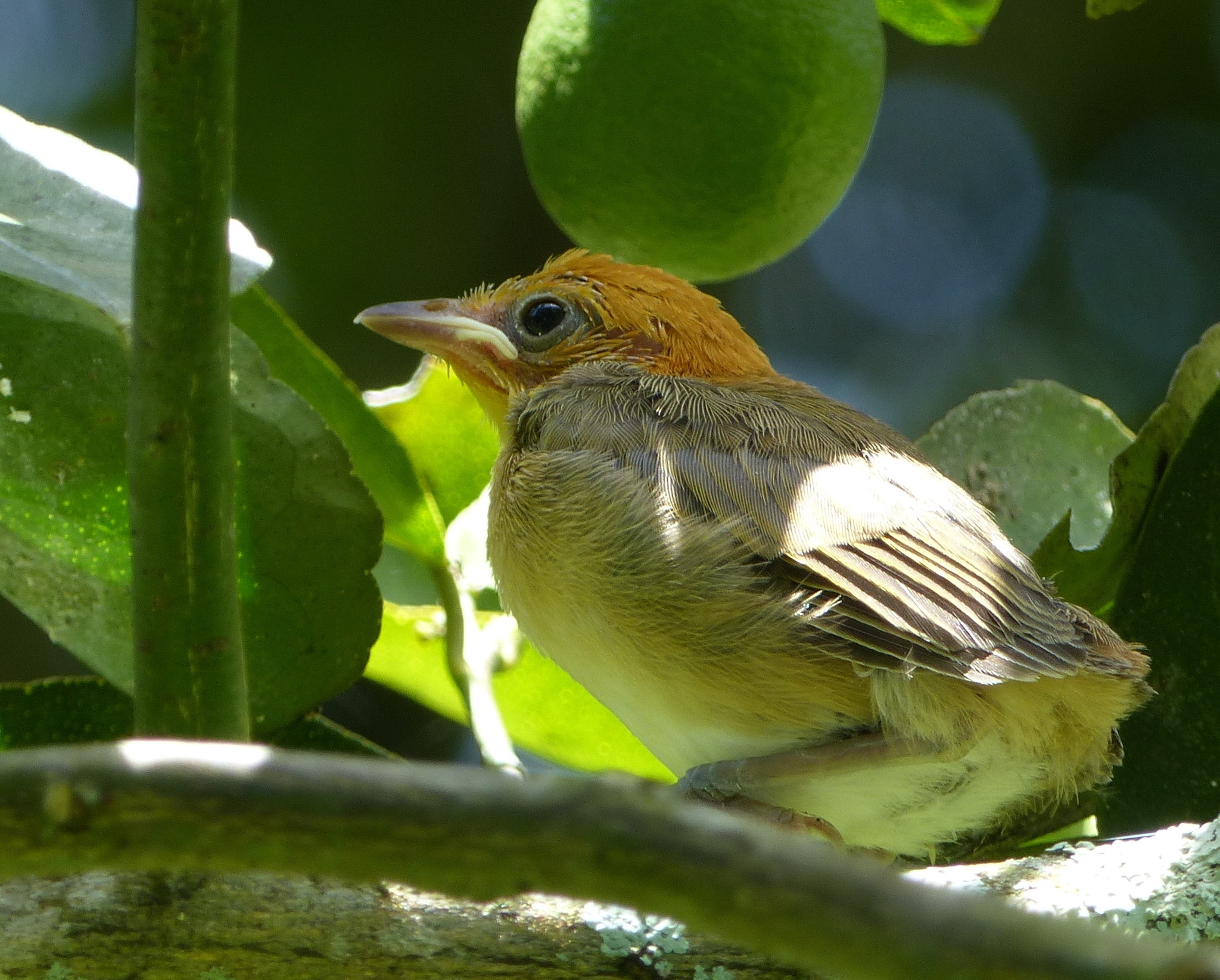
Juvenile

The orange-headed tanager is a small, thin-billed tanager that has an average length of 13 cm (5.1 in) and a weight of 14–19 g (0.49–0.67 oz). Its proportions are similar to those of a New World warbler. Males of the nominate subspecies have rufous-orange crowns and sides of the head, becoming bright yellow on the lores, ocular region (area surrounding eye), and throat. The upperparts are sandy-gray, with dusky primary coverts and flight feathers, the latter of which are edged with gray. The underparts are buff to cinnamon and turn whitish on the center of the lower breast, belly, and undertail coverts. The bill is dark, the iris is dark brown, and the legs are gray.

Females have duller upperparts than males, less extensive yellow on the head, and duller yellow on the face and throat. Immatures are similar to females, but are even duller, with grayish-olive upperparts and paler underparts.

=== Vocalizations ===
The orange-headed tanager's calls include a high-pitched tseet, seet, or sit, often given rapidly multiple times, a quick high-pitched chittering sit-it-t-t-t-t-t-t, and a slower seet-a. The solo song varies geographically: in northern Peru and Ecuador, it is a high-pitched, rising and falling, and spasmodic pits'a, see-a, pits'a, see-ee, while it is a seet, sit, a see-fits-za in northwestern Argentina. In Bolivia and northern Peru, a high-pitched seet seet t-t-t-t-t-t-t-t-t-t-d-dit has been recorded in flight or while perched, which may be either a duet or chatter. In eastern Brazil, the year-round song has several song types, with the most common one being a thin, high-pitched tsap-tsip, tsip, tsip-tsop-tswit. A high-pitched, trilled tsi . . . . tsrrrri has also been recorded from Brazil.

== Distribution and habitat ==
The orange-headed tanager is native to South America, where it is found in Argentina, Bolivia, Brazil, Colombia, Ecuador, Paraguay, Peru, and Venezuela. It is the only member of its genus that is found in the lowlands of the Amazon rainforest. In Venezuela and the western Amazon, it inhabits successional vegetation like tall Gynerium grasses, willows, Tessaria and Cecropia shrubbery, and young secondary growth near rivers and on river islands. In the southern Amazon, it inhabits dry to semi-humid cerrado, open woodland canopies, shrub, parks, and thinner riparian forest (forest next to waterbodies). In northwestern Argentina, it inhabits scrub, brush, and the edges of drier open woodland, and is seldom observed in uninterrupted forest.

The orange-headed tanager generally inhabits elevations up to 800 m (2,600 ft), but is only found up to 100 m (330 ft) in Venezuela and 400 m (1,300 ft) in Colombia. Local populations in Bolivia can inhabit elevations as high as 1,500 m (4,900 ft). In Brazil and Argentina, the species has been recorded seasonally migrating from the Andes to lowlands during the austral winter.

== Behavior and ecology ==
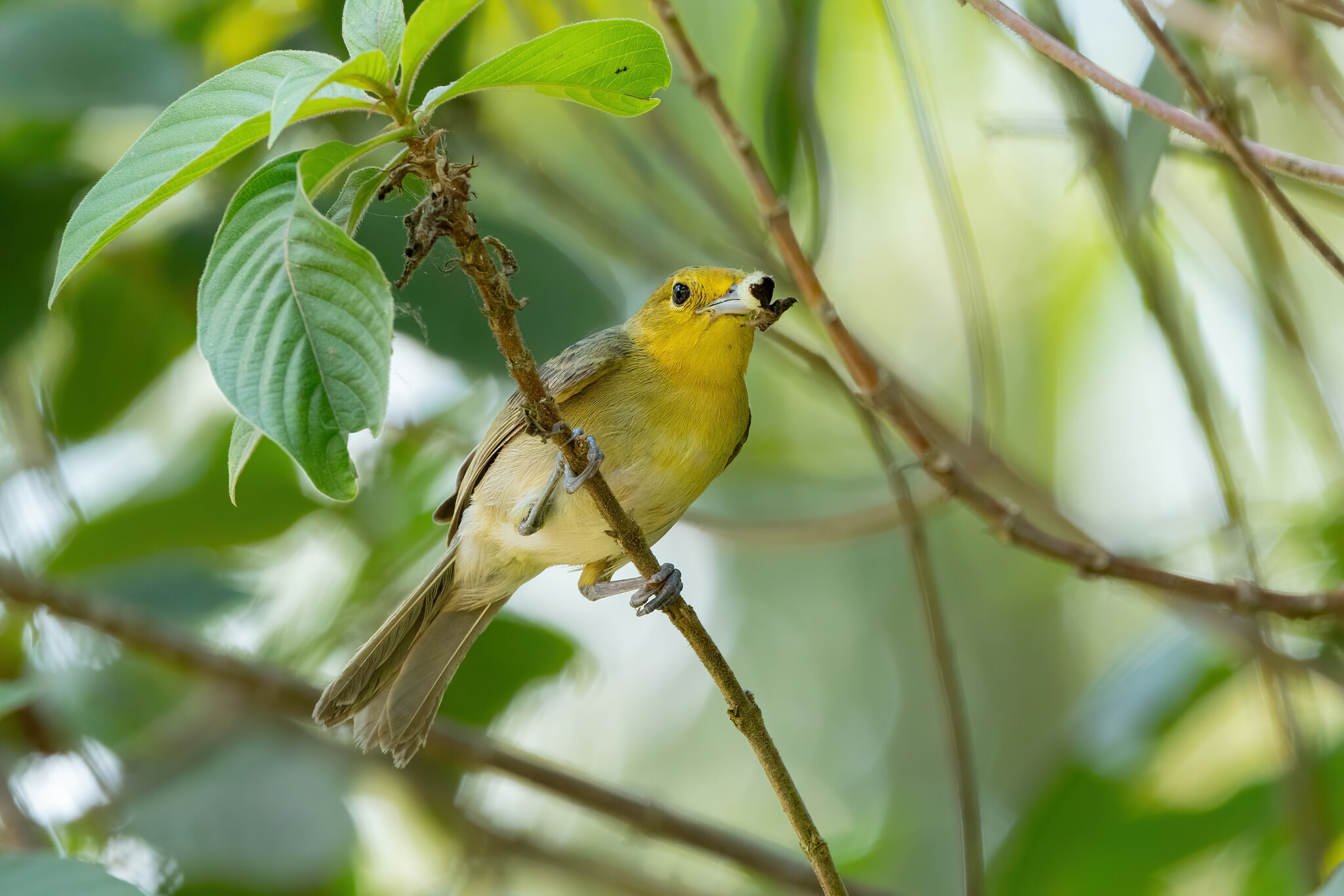
Feeding

The orange-headed tanager is found in pairs or groups of 3–4 individuals, occasionally in mixed-species foraging flocks.

=== Diet ===
The orange-headed tanager is an omnivorous species, having been recorded feeding on orthopterans (grasshoppers, crickets, and locusts), beetles, flies, spiders, fruit, and seeds. It forages in an active, New World warbler-like manner, gleaning insects from foliage with rapid hops, or less commonly hovering or sallying to catch prey in the air.

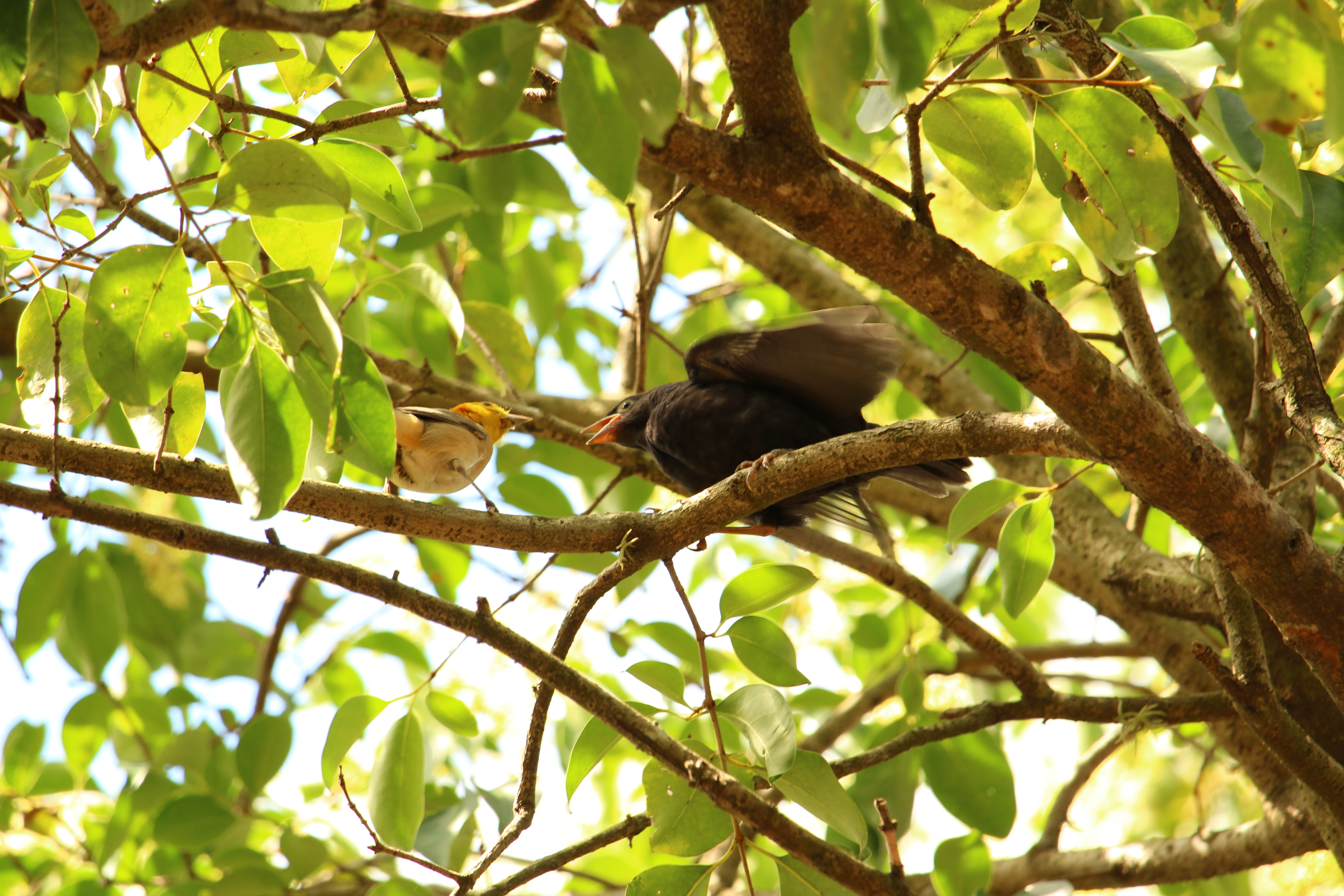
A shiny cowbird chick being fed by an orange-headed tanager

=== Breeding ===
The orange-headed tanager has been recorded nesting in December, building a cup-shaped nest about 2 m (6.6 ft) above the ground. Eggs are laid in clutches of two, and are bluish-white with brown markings. The shiny cowbird has been recorded as a brood parasite of the orange-headed tanager.

== Status ==
The orange-headed tanager is listed as being of least concern by the International Union for Conservation of Nature (IUCN) on the IUCN Red List due to its large range and stable population. It is threatened in parts of its range due to land conversion, but occurs in a number of protected areas and is locally common on river islands and in river floodplains.
