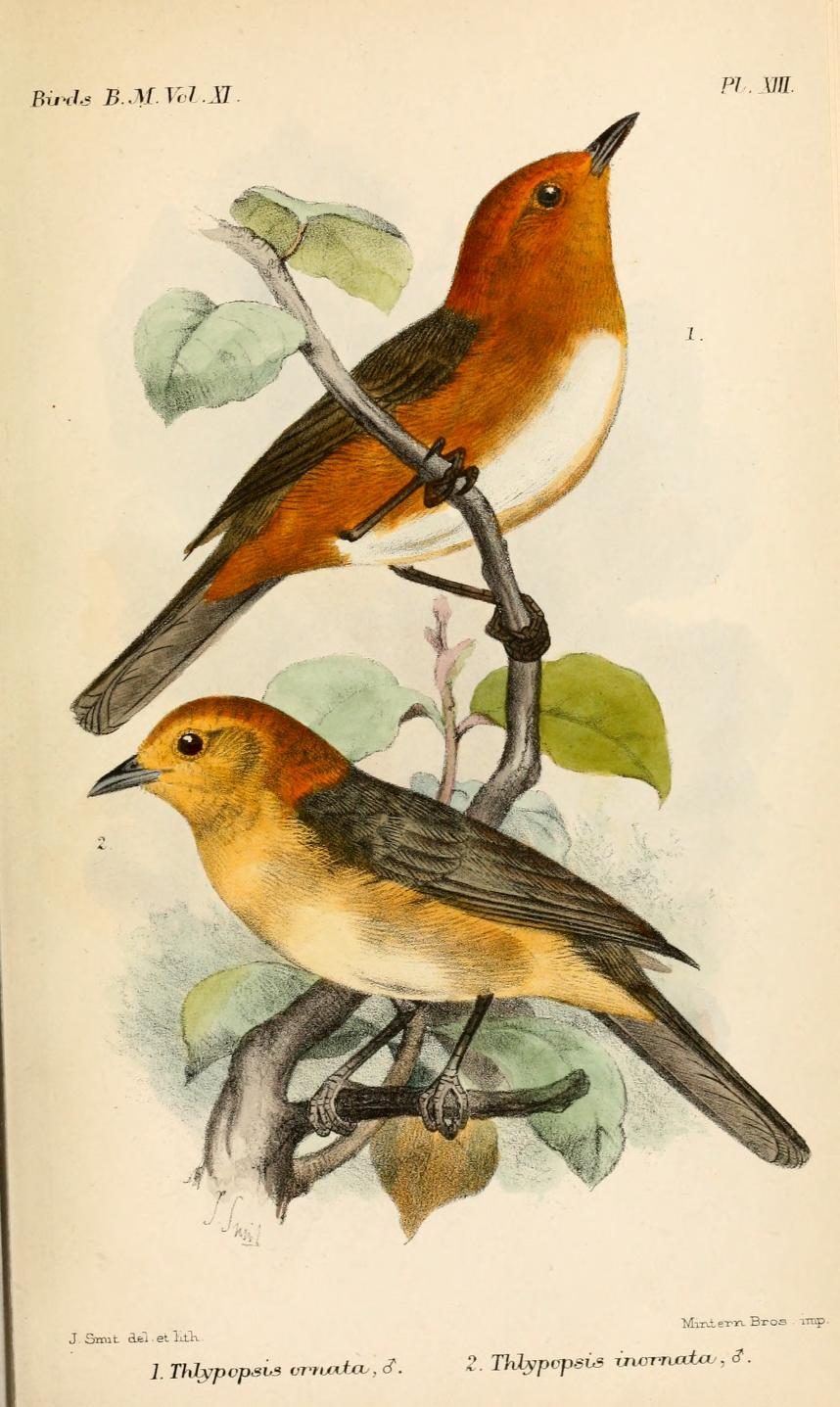
- Rufous-chested tanager (above); and buff-bellied tanager (below); illustration by Joseph Smit, 1886

Scientific classification
- Kingdom: Animalia
- Phylum: Chordata
- Class: Aves
- Order: Passeriformes
- Family: Thraupidae
- Genus: Thlypopsis; Cabanis, 1851

Type species
- Nemosia fulvescens = Nemosia sordida Strickland, 1844

Species
- See text

= Thlypopsis =

Genus of birds

Thlypopsis is a genus of birds in the tanager family Thraupidae.

== Taxonomy and species list ==
The genus Thlypopsis was introduced by the German ornithologists Jean Cabanis in 1851. The name combines the Ancient Greek thlupis, a word for an unknown small bird, and opsis meaning "appearance". The type species was subsequently designated as the orange-headed tanager (Thlypopsis sordida).

The chestnut-headed tanager was formerly placed in the genus Pyrrhocoma and the superciliaried hemispingus in Hemispingus. A molecular phylogenetic study published in 2014 found that these two species were embedded in Thlypopsis.

The genus contains the following eight species:

Image	Scientific name	Common name	Distribution
	Thlypopsis fulviceps	Fulvous-headed tanager	Serranía del Perijá, Cordillera de Mérida and Venezuelan Coastal Range.
	Thlypopsis inornata	Buff-bellied tanager	Peru and far southern Ecuador
	Thlypopsis sordida	Orange-headed tanager	Argentina, Bolivia, Brazil, Colombia, Ecuador, Paraguay, Peru, and Venezuela.
	Thlypopsis pyrrhocoma (formerly assigned to Pyrrhocoma)	Chestnut-headed tanager	east Paraguay, northeast Argentina, and south Brazil
	Thlypopsis ruficeps	Rust-and-yellow tanager	Argentina, Bolivia, and Peru
	Thlypopsis superciliaris (formerly assigned to Hemispingus)	Superciliaried hemispingus	northern Andes
	Thlypopsis ornata	Rufous-chested tanager	Ecuador, Peru and southwestern Colombia
	Thlypopsis pectoralis	Brown-flanked tanager	Peru
