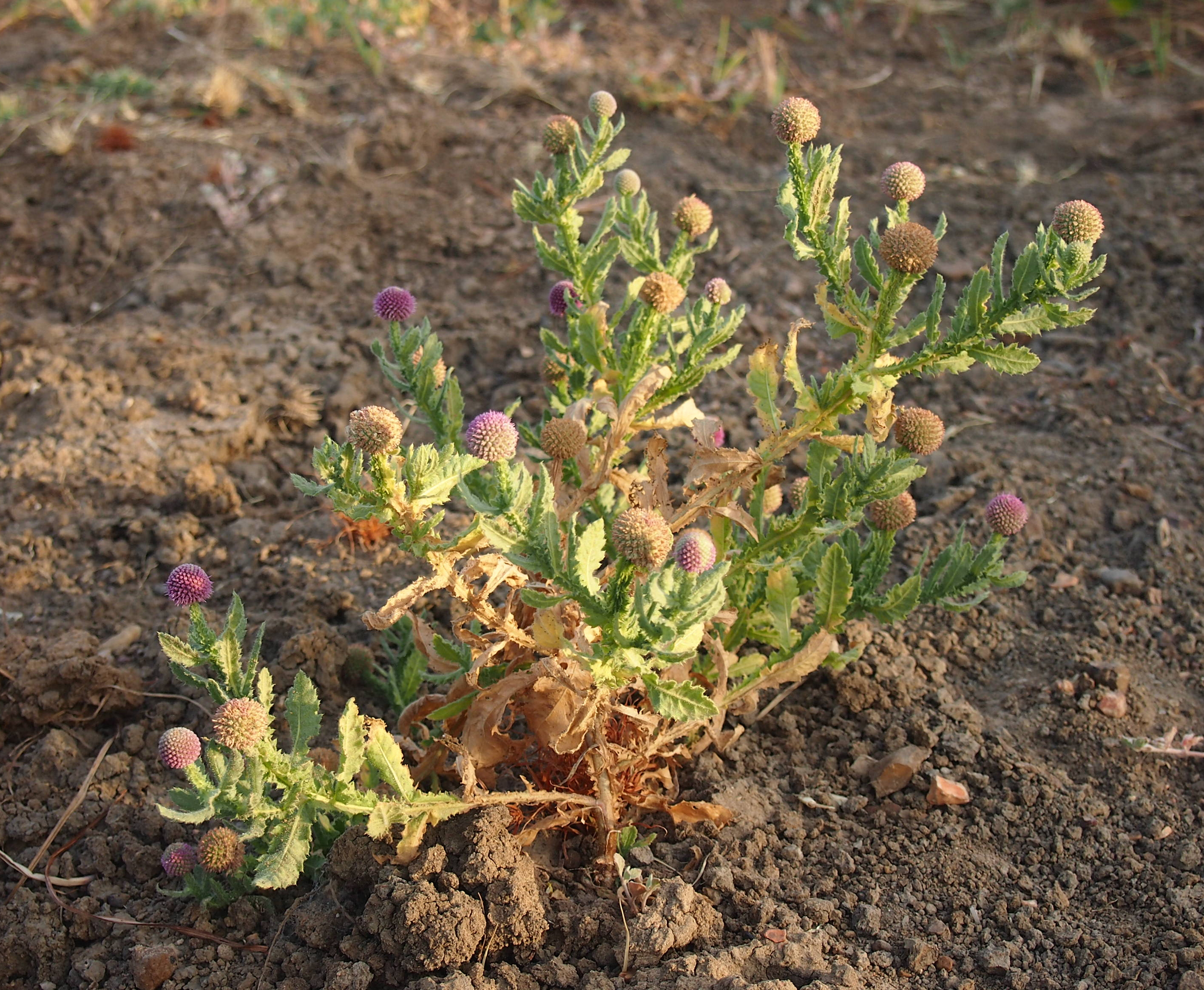

Scientific classification
- Kingdom: Plantae
- Clade: Tracheophytes
- Clade: Angiosperms
- Clade: Eudicots
- Clade: Asterids
- Order: Asterales
- Family: Asteraceae
- Genus: Sphaeranthus
- Species: S. indicus

Binomial name
- Sphaeranthus indicus L.

= Sphaeranthus indicus =

Species of plant

Sphaeranthus indicus, the East Indian globe thistle, is a flowering plant of the genus Sphaeranthus. It is distributed from Northern Australia throughout Indomalaya. The plant has been studied for its potential health-promoting properties, primarily as an anti-inflammatory.

Sphaeranthus indicus Linn. (Asteraceae) is widely used in the Ayurvedic system of medicine in various conditions like epilepsy, mental illness, hemicrania, jaundice, hepatopathy, diabetes, leprosy, fever, pectoralgia, cough, gastropathy, hernia, hemorrhoids, helminthiasis, dyspepsia and skin diseases. In different parts of its range Sphaeranthus indicus is known by different common names.
