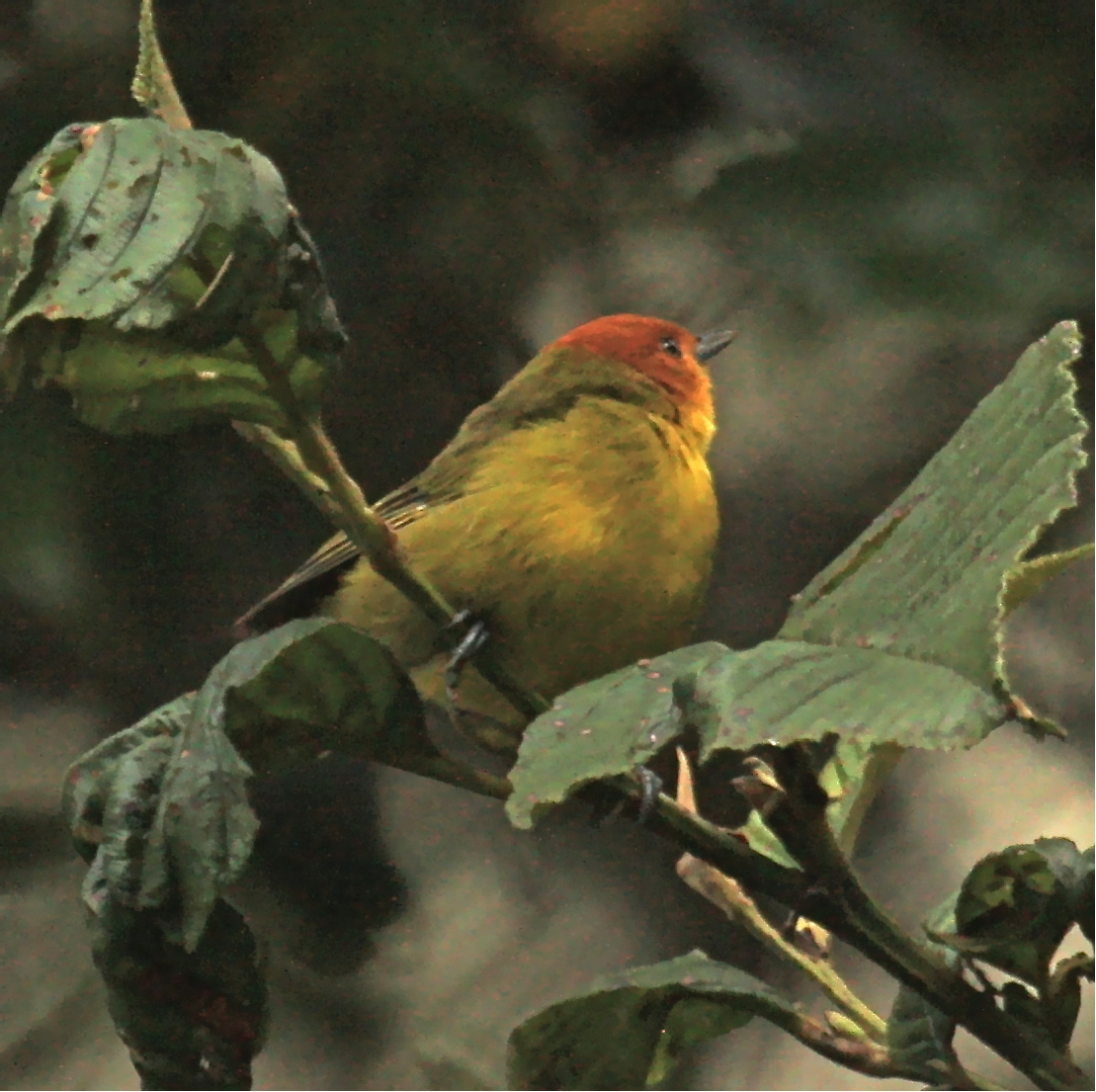

Conservation status
- Least Concern (IUCN 3.1)

Scientific classification
- Kingdom: Animalia
- Phylum: Chordata
- Class: Aves
- Order: Passeriformes
- Family: Thraupidae
- Genus: Thlypopsis
- Species: T. ruficeps

Binomial name
- Thlypopsis ruficeps (d'Orbigny & Lafresnaye, 1837)

= Rust-and-yellow tanager =

Species of bird

The rust-and-yellow tanager (Thlypopsis ruficeps) is a species of bird in the family Thraupidae, the tanagers and allies. It is found in Argentina, Bolivia, and Peru.

== Taxonomy and systematics ==
The rust-and-yellow tanager was formally described in 1837 with the binomial Sylvia ruficeps in the family Sylvidae. By 1938 it had been reassigned to its current binomial in the tanager family.

The rust-and-yellow tanager is monotypic.

== Description ==
The rust-and-yellow tanager is 12.5 to 14 cm (4.9 to 5.5 in) long. It weighs 9.6 to 13 g (0.34 to 0.46 oz). It is a small tanager with a slim bill. The species is sexually dimorphic though not dramatically so. Adult males have a mostly bright rufous head. Their nape, upperparts, and upperwing coverts are bright olive-green. Their flight feathers are dusky with bright olive-green edges and their tertials dusky with olive-green outer webs. Their tail is a slightly duller olive-green than the upperparts. Their throat and underparts are bright yellow with an olive tinge on the sides and flanks. Adult females are overall duller than males. They have an olive crown and nape and a rufous-tinged buffy yellow face. Their back is olive and their wings, tail, and underparts are like the male's. Both sexes have a dark brown iris, a dark gray to blackish bill with often a paler and bluer mandible, and horn-gray legs. Immature birds have very little rufous on the face, olive-green upperparts, and yellow underparts.

== Distribution and habitat ==
The rust-and-yellow tanager is found on the eastern slope of the Andes from Junín and Cuzco departments in central Peru south through Puno Department. There are also records of vagrancy further north to Huánuco Department. Its range continues through Bolivia into northwestern Argentina to Tucumán Province. The species inhabits shrubby humid secondary forest, the edges of older forest and cloudforest, and patches of Chusquea bamboo. It sometimes also is found in Polylepis woodlands. In Peru it ranges in elevation between 1,300 and 3,700 m (4,300 and 12,100 ft). It is mostly somewhat below that maximum in Argentina.

== Behavior ==
=== Movement ===
The rust-and-yellow tanager is a year-round resident in most of its range though it appears to vacate the southernmost part in the austral winter. In Peru, "numbers may be supplemented by austral migrants".

=== Feeding ===
The rust-and-yellow tanager's diet has not been studied but it is known to include insects. It forages singly, in pairs, and in family groups and often joins mixed-species feeding flocks. It forages restlessly in low, dense, vegetation. It takes prey from foliage, flowers, and bamboo stalks.

=== Breeding ===
The rust-and-yellow tanager's breeding season has not been detailed but includes at least May and June in Peru, February and May in Bolivia, and January in Argentina. Nothing else is known about the species' breeding biology.

=== Vocalization ===
The rust-and-yellow tanager's song is "a thin, high, wheedling phrase" and its call "a thin tip or tink".

== Status ==
The IUCN has assessed the rust-and-yellow tanager as being of Least Concern. It has a large range; its population size is not known and is believed to be decreasing. No immediate threats have been identified. It is considered fairly common to locally common overall and fairly common in Peru. It occurs in several protected areas and "there are extensive areas of appropriate contiguous habitat in this species’ range that are not protected, but appear not to be under immediate threat".
