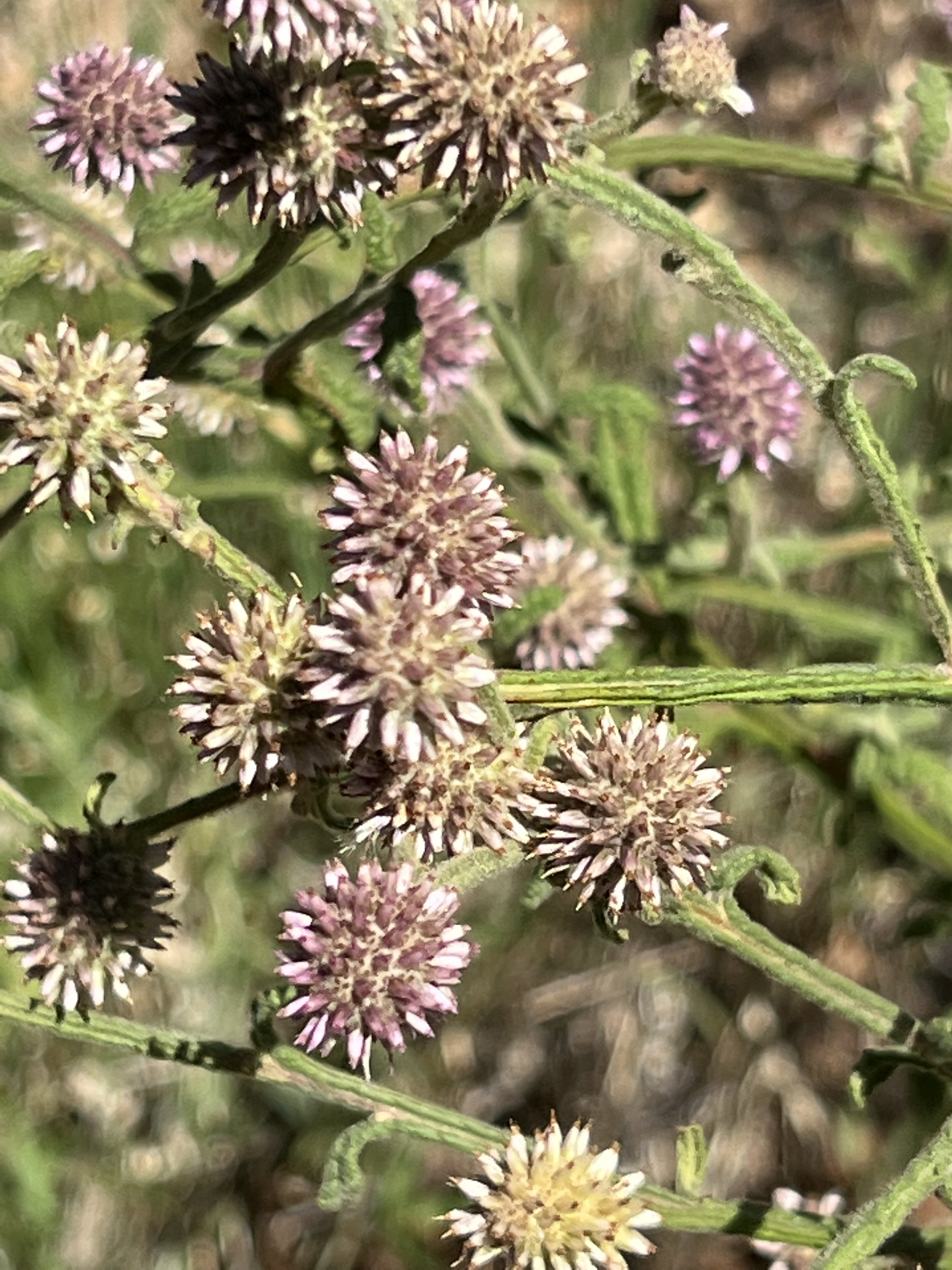

Scientific classification
- Kingdom: Plantae
- Clade: Tracheophytes
- Clade: Angiosperms
- Clade: Eudicots
- Clade: Asterids
- Order: Asterales
- Family: Asteraceae
- Genus: Pterocaulon
- Species: P. sphacelatum

Binomial name
- Pterocaulon sphacelatum (Labill.) Benth. ex F.Muell.

= Pterocaulon sphacelatum =

Apple bush

Species of plant

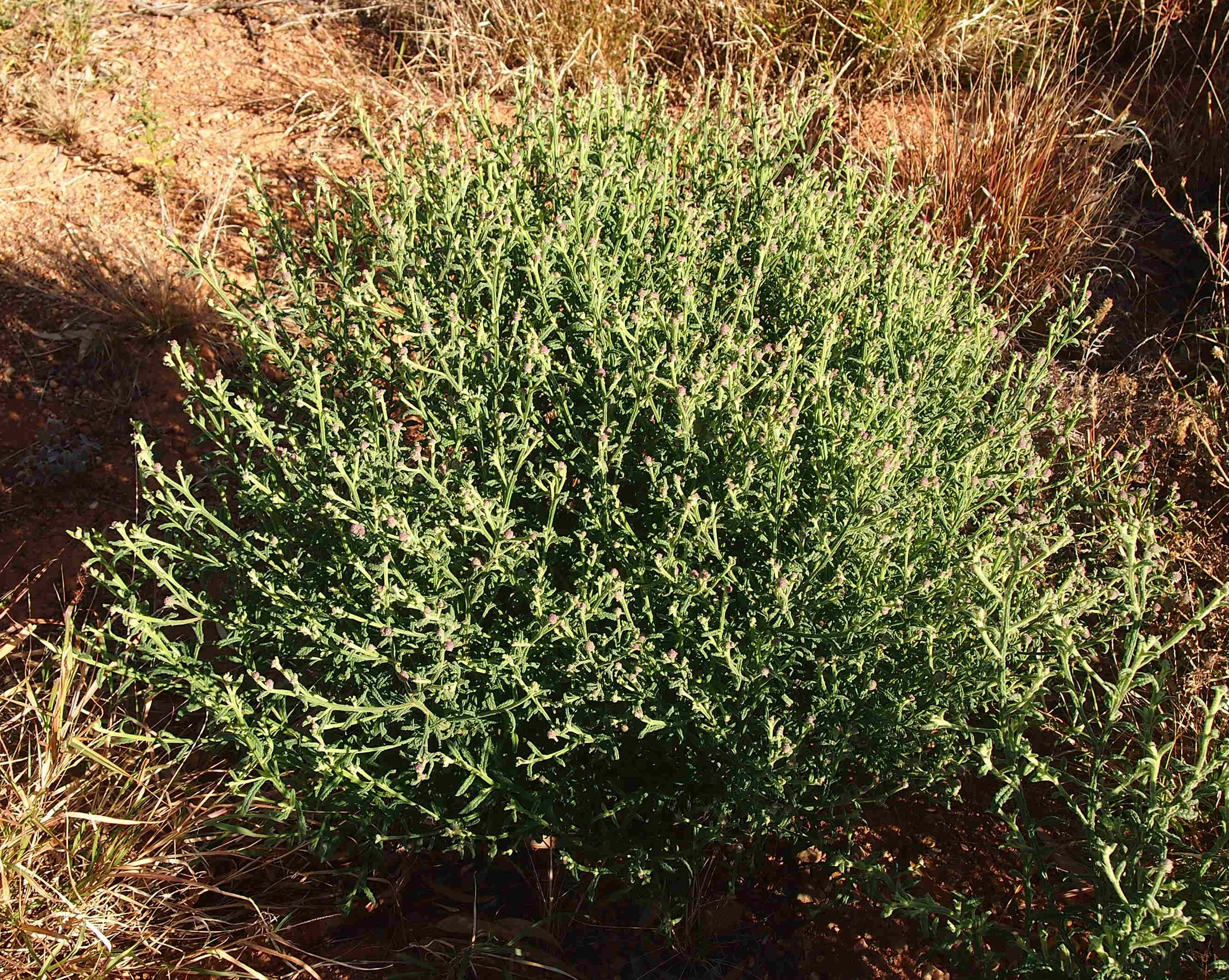
Habit

Pterocaulon sphacelatum, commonly known as apple bush or fruit-salad plant, is a species of flowering plant in the family Asteraceae. It is an upright shrub with mostly pink to purple flowers and is endemic to Australia.

== Description ==
Pterocaulon sphacelatum is a small understory, perennial herb or shrub to 20–100 cm (7.9–39.4 in) high, stiff upright stems and covered with short brownish woolly or short, matted dense hairs. The leaves are usually oblong to lance-shaped, pointed or nearly so, 1–4 cm (0.39–1.57 in) long, 3–15 mm (0.12–0.59 in) wide, green and hairy on both surfaces, somewhat wrinkled, a distinctive mid-vein, upper leaves slightly scalloped or entire, lower leaves toothed. The solitary flower heads are oval to globe-shaped, 0.8–2 cm (0.31–0.79 in) long, 10–20 mm (0.39–0.79 in) in diameter, sessile or on stalk. The outer bracts are spoon-shaped, inner bracts linear-lance shaped and whitish to pink and the florets pink to purple. Flowering occurs from July to October and the fruit is a brown spindle-shaped achene about 0.7–2 mm (0.028–0.079 in) long, covered in about 15-20 bristles and slightly ribbed. The "applebush" is an aromatic plant used in Australian Aboriginal medicine.

== Taxonomy and naming ==
The species was first formally described by Jacques Labillardière as Monenteles sphacelatus. In 1882, Ferdinand von Mueller changed the name to Pterocaulon sphacelatum, attributing the change to George Bentham; the description was published in Systematic Census of Australian Plants. The specific epithet (sphacelatum) means "brown or blackish speckling".

== Distribution and habitat ==
Applebush grows in a variety of habitats, mostly on occasional flooded locations, disturbed sites including roadsides in Western Australia, Queensland, New South Wales, Victoria and the Northern Territory.
