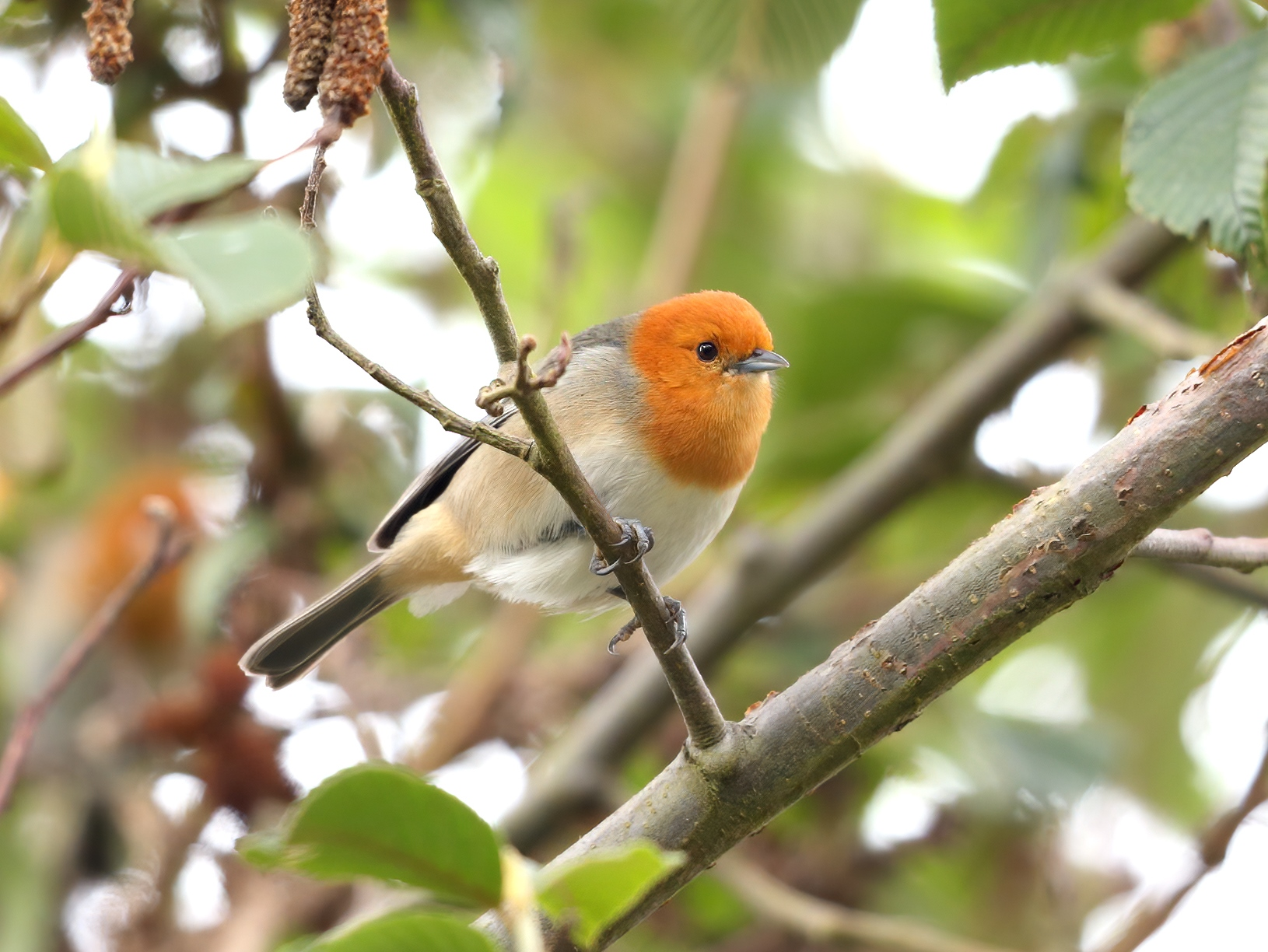

Conservation status
- Least Concern (IUCN 3.1)

Scientific classification
- Kingdom: Animalia
- Phylum: Chordata
- Class: Aves
- Order: Passeriformes
- Family: Thraupidae
- Genus: Thlypopsis
- Species: T. pectoralis

Binomial name
- Thlypopsis pectoralis (Taczanowski, 1884)

= Brown-flanked tanager =

Species of bird

The brown-flanked tanager (Thlypopsis pectoralis) is a species of bird in the family Thraupidae. It is endemic to Peru.

Its natural habitats are subtropical or tropical high-altitude shrubland and heavily degraded former forest.
