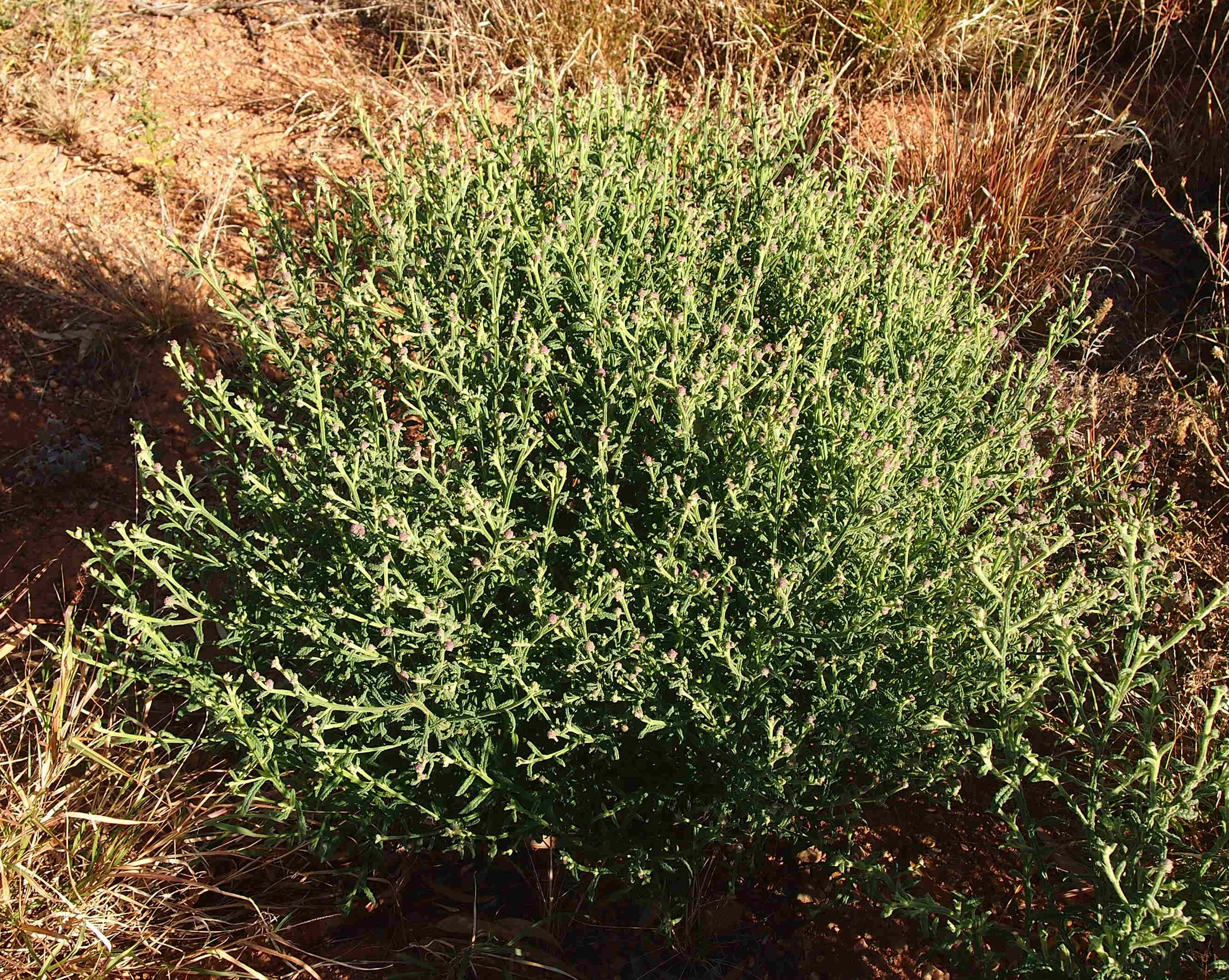
- Pterocaulon sphacelatum

Scientific classification
- Kingdom: Plantae
- Clade: Tracheophytes
- Clade: Angiosperms
- Clade: Eudicots
- Clade: Asterids
- Order: Asterales
- Family: Asteraceae
- Subfamily: Asteroideae
- Tribe: Inuleae
- Genus: Pterocaulon; Elliott

Type species
- Conyza pycnostachya (basionym of Pterocaulon pycnostachyum) Michx.

Synonyms
- Monenteles Labill.; Chlaenobolus Cass.

= Pterocaulon =

Genus of plants

Pterocaulon is a genus of flowering plants in the sunflower family, native to North and South America and to Australasia. Blackroot is a common name for species native to North America.

The plants are perennial herbs, frequently densely covered with woolly hairs. The generic name means "winged stem," referring to the decurrent leaf bases that give the appearance of wings running down the sides of the stems.

Species

- Pterocaulon alopecuroides - South America, Puerto Rico, Virgin Islands
- Pterocaulon angustifolium - Brazil, Argentina, Paraguay, Uruguay
- Pterocaulon balansae - Brazil, Argentina, Paraguay, Uruguay
- Pterocaulon cordobense - Brazil, Argentina, Paraguay, Uruguay
- Pterocaulon globuliflorus - Western Australia, Northern Territory
- Pterocaulon lanatum - Brazil, Bolivia, Paraguay, Salta
- Pterocaulon lorentzii - Brazil, Argentina, Paraguay, Uruguay, Bolivia
- Pterocaulon niveum - Western Australia, Northern Territory
- Pterocaulon polypterum - Brazil, Argentina, Uruguay
- Pterocaulon polystachyum - Brazil, Argentina, Paraguay, Uruguay
- Pterocaulon purpurascens - Mato Grosso, Argentina, Paraguay, Bolivia
- Pterocaulon pycnostachyum - United States (AL GA FL SC NC)
- Pterocaulon redolens - Indochina, Hainan, Orissa, Philippines, Maluku, New Guinea, eastern Australia
- Pterocaulon rugosum - Brazil, Argentina, Paraguay
- Pterocaulon serrulatum - Western Australia, Northern Territory, South Australia
- Pterocaulon sphacelatum - Australia
- Pterocaulon sphaeranthoides - Western Australia, Northern Territory, Queensland
- Pterocaulon spicatum - South America
- Pterocaulon verbascifolium - Western Australia, Northern Territory, Queensland
- Pterocaulon virgatum - Central + South America, West Indies, United States (TX LA)
