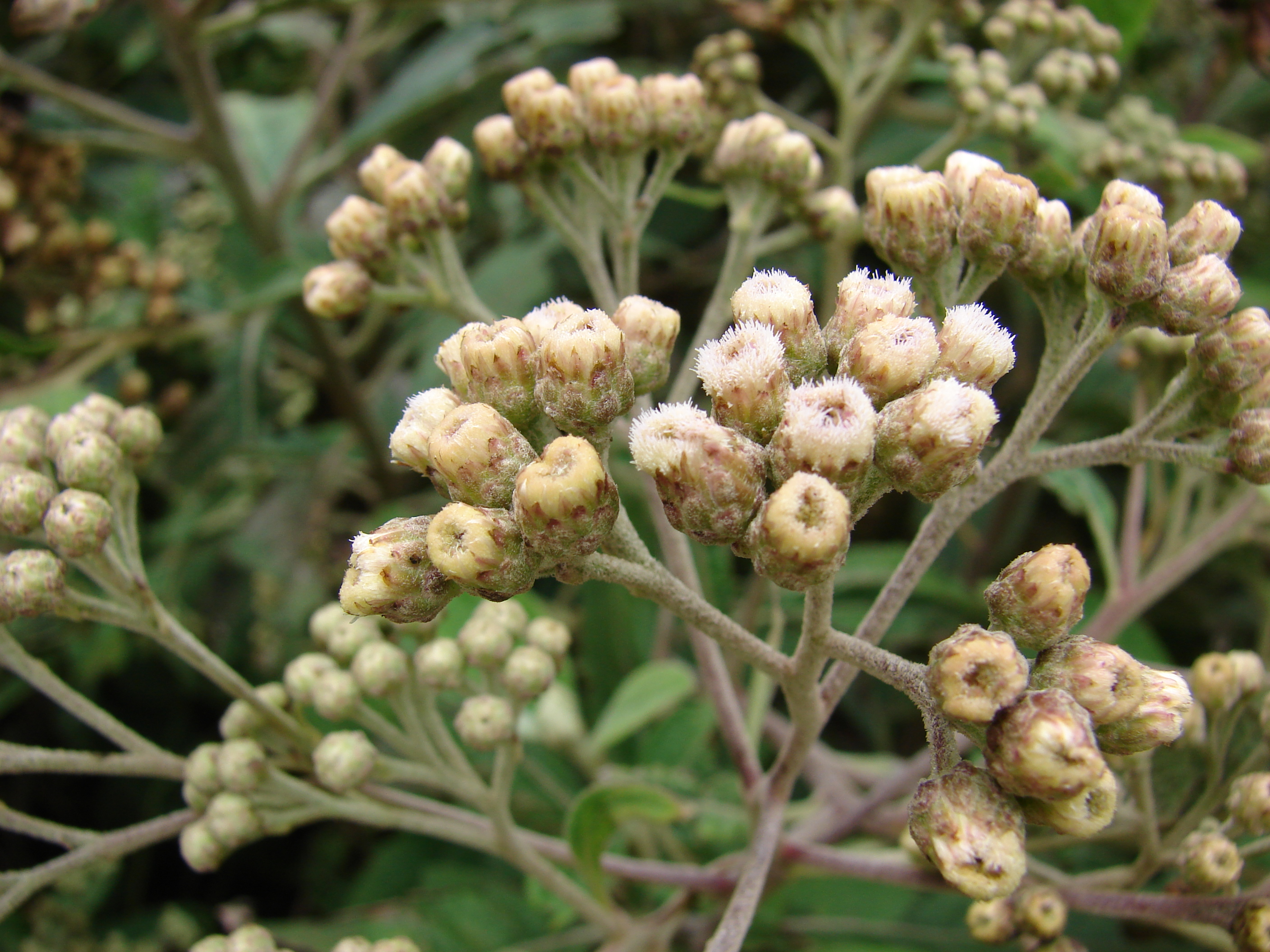
- Pluchea carolinensis

Scientific classification
- Kingdom: Plantae
- Clade: Tracheophytes
- Clade: Angiosperms
- Clade: Eudicots
- Clade: Asterids
- Order: Asterales
- Family: Asteraceae
- Subfamily: Asteroideae
- Tribe: Inuleae
- Genus: Pluchea; Cass.

Type species
- Conyza marilandica Michx.

Synonyms
- Pluechea Zoll.; Gymnostylis Raf.; Tecmarsis DC.; Gynema Raf.; Oliganthemum F.Muell.; Eyrea F.Muell.; Spiropodium F.Muell.; Berthelotia DC.; Stylimnus Raf.; Leptogyne Less.; Eremohylema A.Nelson; Conyza subg. Pluchea (Cass.) Miq.

= Pluchea =

Genus of plants

Pluchea is a genus of flowering plants in the tribe Inuleae within the family Asteraceae. Members of this genus might be known as camphorweeds, plucheas, or less uniquely fleabanes. Some, such as P. carolinensis and P. odorata, are called sourbushes. There are plants of many forms, from annual and perennial herbs to shrubs and trees, and there is variation in the morphology of leaves, flowers, and fruits.

The genus was named for the French naturalist Abbé Noël-Antoine Pluche.

Species

- Pluchea arabica (Boiss.) Qaiser & Lack - Yemen, Oman
- Pluchea arguta Boiss. - India, Iran
- Pluchea baccharis (Mill.) Pruski – rosy camphorweed - southeastern United States, Bahamas, Cuba, Yucatán Peninsula, Central America
- Pluchea baccharoides (F.Muell.) F.Muell. ex Benth. - Australia
- Pluchea bequaertii Robyns -central Africa
- Pluchea biformis DC.
- Pluchea bojeri (DC.) Humbert - Madagascar
- Pluchea camphorata (L.) DC. – camphor pluchea - eastern + central United States, Mexico
- Pluchea carolinensis (Jacq.) G.Don – cure-for-all - Latin America, West Indies, Florida
- Pluchea chingoyo (Kunth) DC. - Peru, Chile
- Pluchea dentex R.Br. ex Benth. - Australia
- Pluchea dioscoridis (L.) DC. - Egypt, Middle East
- Pluchea dodonaeifolia (Hook. & Arn.) H.Rob. & Cuatrec. - Bolivia
- Pluchea domingensis Klatt - Hispaniola
- Pluchea dunlopii Hunger - Australia
- Pluchea eupatorioides Kurz - China, Indochina
- Pluchea ferdinandi-muelleri Domin - Australia
- Pluchea fiebrigii H.Rob. & Cuatrec. - Bolivia
- Pluchea foetida (L.) DC. – stinking camphorweed - southeastern United States, Yucatán Peninsula
- †Pluchea glutinosa Balf.f. (extinct)
- Pluchea grevei (Baill.) Humbert - Madagascar
- Pluchea heterophylla Vatke - tropical Africa
- Pluchea hirsuta (L.) Less. - India
- Pluchea indica (L.) Less. – Indian camphorweed, Indian fleabane - India, China, Japan, Southeast Asia, Australia
- Pluchea kelleri (Thell.) Thulin - Somalia
- Pluchea lanceolata (DC.) Oliv. & Hiern - India, Afghanistan, parts of western Africa
- Pluchea lanuginosa C.B.Clarke - India
- Pluchea laxiflora Hook. & Arn. ex Baker
- Pluchea linearifolia C.B.Clarke - eastern India
- Pluchea littoralis Thulin
- Pluchea lucens Thulin
- Pluchea lycioides (Hiern) Merxm. - South Africa
- Pluchea mexicana (R.K.Godfrey) G.L.Nesom - San Luis Potosí
- Pluchea microcephala R.K.Godfrey - Bolivia, Peru, Argentina
- Pluchea nogalensis Chiov. - Somalia
- Pluchea oblongifolia DC. - Brazil
- Pluchea odorata (L.) Cass. – sweetscent, saltmarsh fleabane - from Ontario to Bolivia
- Pluchea ovalis (Pers.) DC. - Arabian Peninsula, Morocco
- Pluchea parvifolia (A.Gray) R.K.Godfrey - Baja California
- Pluchea polygonata (DC.) Gagnep. - India, Indochina
- Pluchea pteropoda Hemsl. ex Hemsl - China, Indochina
- Pluchea rosea R.K.Godfrey - Mexico, Honduras, south-central + southeastern United States
- Pluchea rubelliflora (F.Muell.) B.L.Rob. - Australia
- Pluchea rufescens (DC.) A.J.Scott - Mauritius
- Pluchea sagittalis Less. – wingstem camphorweed - South America, West Indies
- Pluchea salicifolia (Mill.) S.F.Blake - Mexico, Guatemala
- Pluchea sarcophylla Chiov. - Somalia
- Pluchea scabrida DC. - Philippines
- Pluchea sericea (Nutt.) Coville – arrowweed - southwestern United States, northwestern Mexico
- Pluchea somaliensis (Thell.) Thulin - Somalia
- Pluchea sordida (Vatke) Oliv. & Hiern - tropical Africa
- Pluchea succulenta Mesfin - Somalia
- Pluchea tertanthera F.Muell. - Australia
- Pluchea tomentosa DC. - India
- Pluchea wallichiana DC. - India
- Pluchea yucatanensis G.L.Nesom – Yucatán camphorweed - Yucatán Peninsula incl Belize

Formerly included

- Allopterigeron filifolius (F.Muell.) Dunlop (as P. filifolia F.Muell.)
- Baccharis decussata (Klatt) Hieron. (as P. decussata Klatt)
- Cratystylis conocephala (F.Muell.) S.Moore (as P. conocephala (F.Muell.) F.Muell.)
- Neurolaena lobata (L.) Cass. (as P. symphytifolia (Mill.) Gillis)
- Streptoglossa liatroides (Turcz.) Dunlop (as P. ligulata F.Muell.)
- Streptoglossa macrocephala (F.Muell.) Dunlop (as P. macrocephala F.Muell.)
- Streptoglossa odora (F.Muell.) Dunlop (as P. odora F.Muell.)
- Thespidium basiflorum (F.Muell.) F.Muell. ex Benth. (as P. basiflora F.Muell.)
