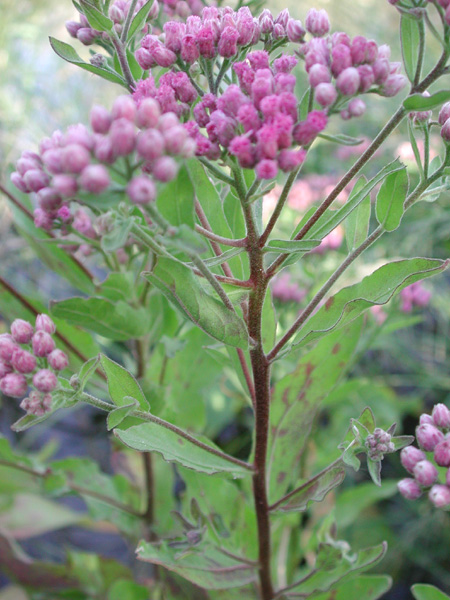
- Pluchea odorata

Scientific classification
- Kingdom: Plantae
- Clade: Tracheophytes
- Clade: Angiosperms
- Clade: Eudicots
- Clade: Asterids
- Order: Asterales
- Family: Asteraceae
- Subfamily: Asteroideae
- Tribe: Plucheeae; Benth. A. Anderb. (1989)

Type genus
- Pluchea Cass.

Genera
- See text

= Plucheeae =

Tribe of flowering plants

Plucheeae, sometimes also spelt as Plucheae, is a tribe of flowering plants in the subfamily Asteroideae.

== Genera ==
This tribe was created by A. Anderberg (1989) following his reclassification of the Inuleae (Cass.) tribe. It includes the following genera:

- Cylindrocline
- Pluchea
- Porphyrostemma
- Pterocaulon
- Rhodogeron
- Sachsia
- Sphaeranthus
- Streptoglossa

Anderberg's molecular data from 2005 does not support the monophyly of a tribe defined in this way. His 2005 classification does not recognize Plucheeae, but includes it in the Inuleae. This classification does include a subtribe Plucheinae in the Inuleae, but this subtribe contains a number of species from the former Inuleae as well as all the species which had been in Plucheeae.

== Bibliography ==
- Anderberg, A. A. 1989: Phylogeny and reclassification of the tribe Inuleae (Asteraceae). − Can. J. Bot. 67: 2277−2296.
- — 1991: Taxonomy and phylogeny of the tribe Plucheae. – Pl. Syst. Evol. 176: 145−177.
