= Marsh fleabane =

Marsh fleabane might be:

- Senecio congestus or Senecio palustris or Cineraria palustris or Tephroseris palustris or Othonna palustris
- Pluchea odorata (Salt-marsh fleabane)
- Pluchea camphorata or Pluchea purpurascens
