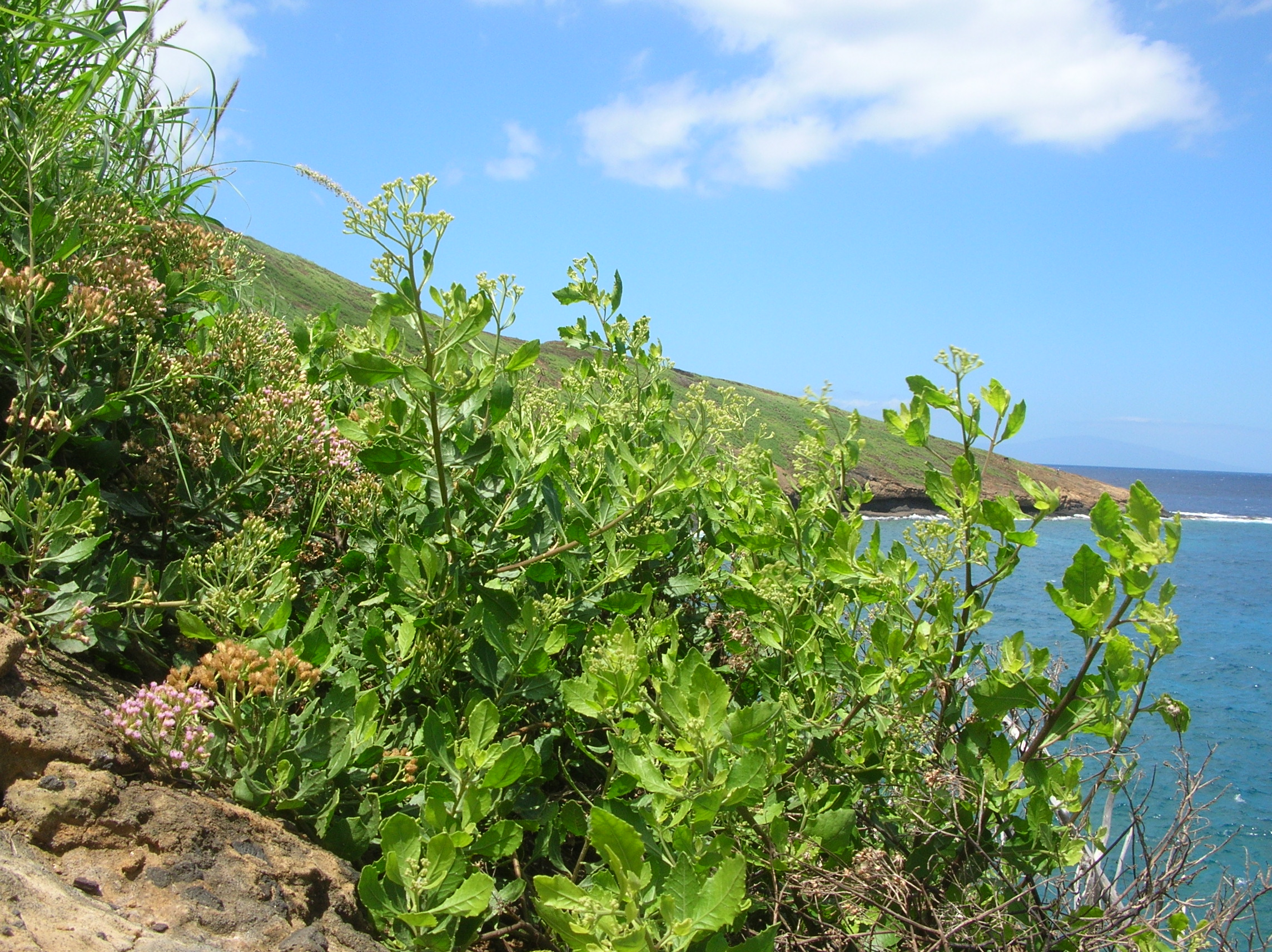
- Naturalized in Maui

Scientific classification
- Kingdom: Plantae
- Clade: Tracheophytes
- Clade: Angiosperms
- Clade: Eudicots
- Clade: Asterids
- Order: Asterales
- Family: Asteraceae
- Genus: Pluchea
- Species: P. indica

Binomial name
- Pluchea indica (L.) Less.

Synonyms
- Baccharis indica L. (basionym)

= Pluchea indica =

Species of plant

Pluchea indica is a species of flowering plant in the aster family, Asteraceae. Its common names include Indian camphorweed, Indian fleabane, and Indian pluchea. It is native to parts of Asia and Australia, and it is widespread in the Pacific Islands as an introduced and often invasive species.

The species hybridizes with Pluchea carolinensis when the two plants grow together, yielding a hybrid that has been named Pluchea × fosbergii.

== Description ==
This species is a branching shrub up to 2 meters tall. The toothed oval leaf blades are papery but not thin, and often have a fine coating of hairs. The flower heads grow in dense clusters in the leaf axils and at the branch tips. The pinkish purple florets have long, protruding styles. Florets along the edges of the head produce fruits. The fruit body is a millimeter in length with a white pappus about 5 millimeters long. The seeds are dispersed on the wind.

== Uses ==
The plant contains the compounds β-sitosterol and stigmasterol, which have antidiabetic properties. The β-sitosterol isolated from the root extract can also neutralize the venom of Russell's viper (Daboia russelii) and the monocled cobra (Naja kaouthia).

== Habitat ==
The plant often grows in wet saline coastal habitat, such as brackish marshes and mangroves. Though it is not very competitive with other flora, it can easily colonize coastal habitat and impact native and cultivated plants. It alters waterbird habitat. It is considered invasive in New Caledonia, where it was introduced in 1967.
