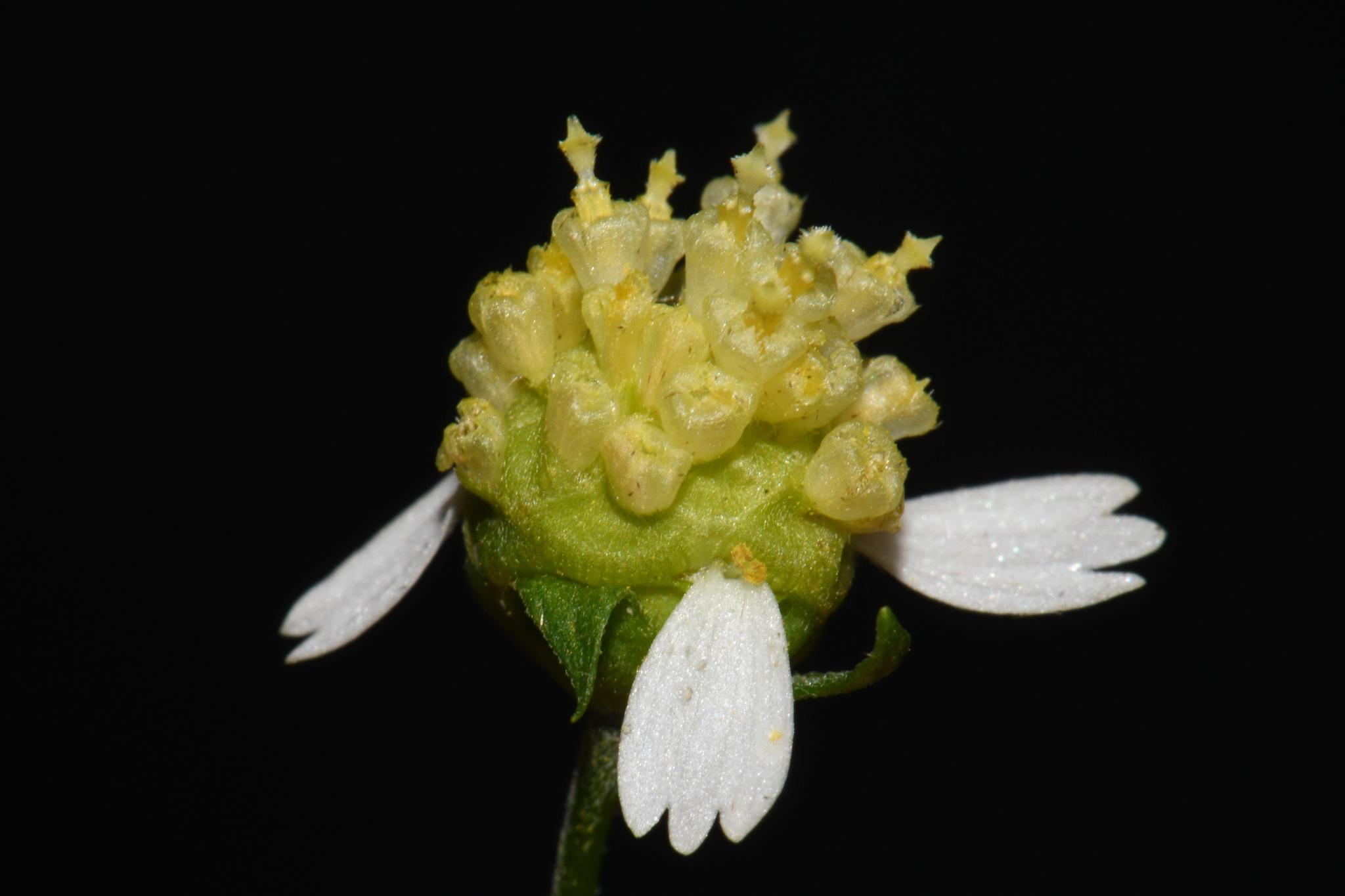

Conservation status
- Vulnerable (NatureServe)

Scientific classification
- Kingdom: Plantae
- Clade: Embryophytes
- Clade: Tracheophytes
- Clade: Spermatophytes
- Clade: Angiosperms
- Clade: Eudicots
- Clade: Asterids
- Order: Asterales
- Family: Asteraceae
- Genus: Polymnia
- Species: P. laevigata

Binomial name
- Polymnia laevigata Beadle

= Polymnia laevigata =

Species of sunflower

Polymnia laevigata, also known as the Tennessee leafcup, is a species of flowering plant in the genus Polymnia, native to North America. The species was first described in 1898 by botanist Chauncey Beadle.

It is a perennial herb that grows upright, with relatively smooth stems compared to other species in the genus. The leaves are broad and usually lobed, and they occur in opposite pairs along the stem. Like other members of the sunflower family, it produces composite flower heads made up of many small florets. Flowering typically takes place during summer.

Polymnia laevigata is found across the southeastern United States, including in Alabama, Georgia, Florida, Kentucky, Missouri and Tennessee.
