= Streptoglossa tenuiflora =

Scientific classification
- Kingdom: Plantae
- Clade: Tracheophytes
- Clade: Angiosperms
- Clade: Eudicots
- Clade: Asterids
- Order: Asterales
- Family: Asteraceae
- Genus: Streptoglossa
- Species: S. tenuiflora

Binomial name
- Streptoglossa tenuiflora Dunlop

Species of flowering plant

Streptoglossa tenuiflora is a species of flowering plant in the family Asteraceae. It is an upright perennial or annual herb with pink to purple flowers. It is endemic to Western Australia.

== Description ==
Streptoglossa tenuiflora is an upright, annual or perennial herb to 30 cm (12 in) high. The leaves and branches are slightly fragrant, and covered with soft, weak, separated thin hairs or with long, soft, straight hairs and glandular. The lower leaves are oblong-lance shaped, 25–40 mm (0.98–1.57 in) long, 3–8 mm (0.12–0.31 in) wide, tapering at the base, irregularly toothed. The upper leaves oblong-lance shaped to linear, 6–25 mm (0.24–0.98 in) long and 0.5–3 mm (0.020–0.118 in) wide. The pink or blue-purple "flowers" are arranged in loose corymbs and florets in a group of about 90. The disc floret corolla about 6 mm (0.24 in) long, 4 or 5 lobed and glandular. Flowering occurs from April to October and the fruit is dry, one-seeded, about 2 mm (0.079 in) long, ribbed and covered in silky, flattened hairs.

== Taxonomy and naming ==
Streptoglossa tenuiflora was first described in 1981 by Clyde Robert Dunlop and the description was published in Journal of the Adelaide Botanic Garden. The specific epithet (tenuiflora) means "thin flowered".

== Distribution and habitat ==
This streptoglossa grows on clay, edges of streams and mud flats north of Carnarvon to the Kimberley region.
