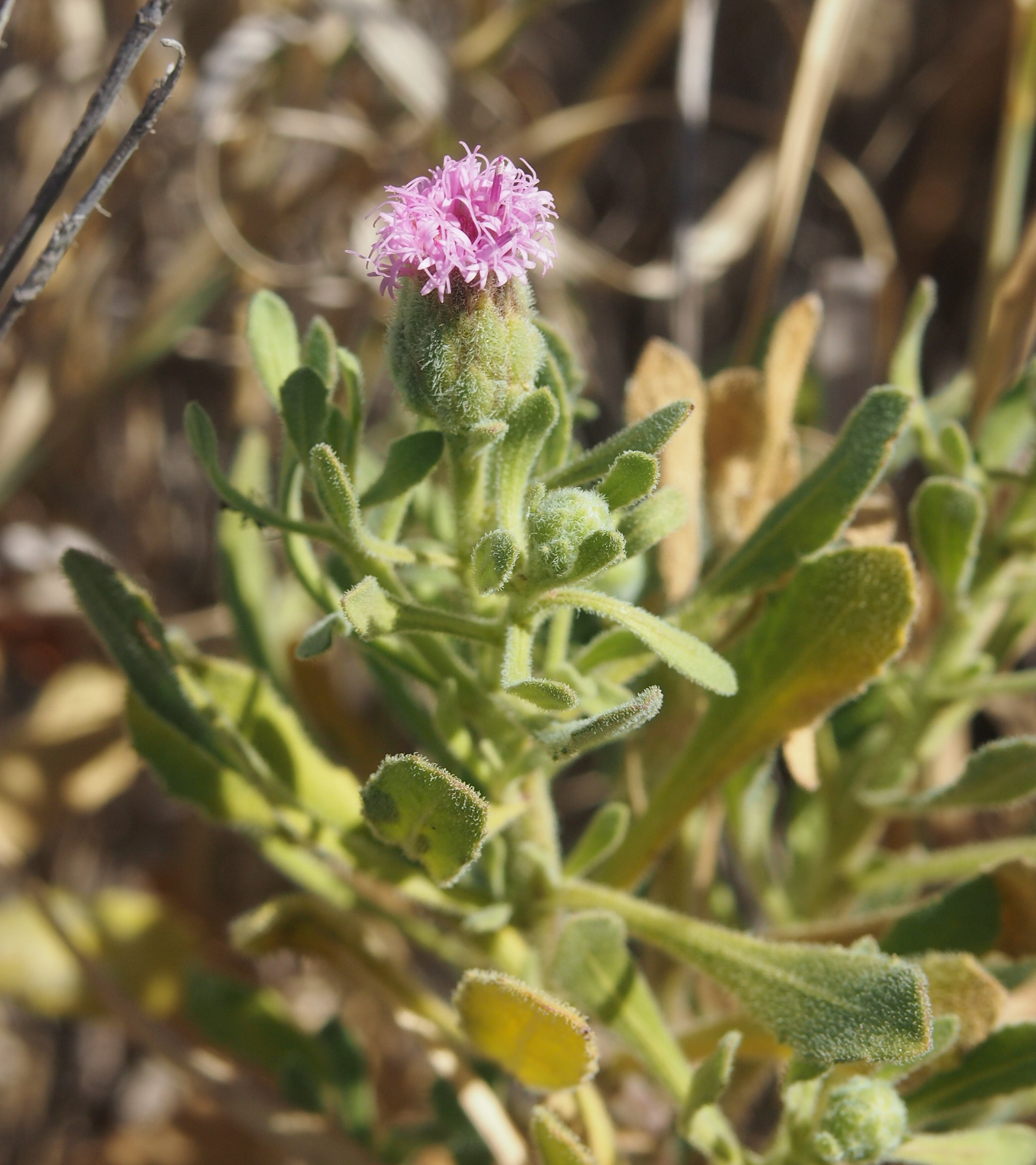

Scientific classification
- Kingdom: Plantae
- Clade: Tracheophytes
- Clade: Angiosperms
- Clade: Eudicots
- Clade: Asterids
- Order: Asterales
- Family: Asteraceae
- Genus: Streptoglossa
- Species: S. bubakii

Binomial name
- Streptoglossa bubakii (Domin) Dunlop

= Streptoglossa bubakii =

Species of flowering plant

Streptoglossa bubakii is a species of flowering plant in the family Asteraceae and grows in Queensland, Western Australia and the Northern Territory. It is an upright, aromatic perennial herb with pink, purplish-blue or red to brown flowers.

== Description ==
Streptoglossa bubakii is a perennial with woody branches and herbaceous branches growing to 70 cm (28 in) high. The leaves and branches are strongly fragrant, sticky and covered with soft, weak, thin hairs to long, soft, straight hairs and thickly glandular. The stems are upright or ascending, leafy, older plants many branched and dense. The leaves are oblong-lance shaped or egg-shaped, apex sharp, blunt or rounded, narrowing gradually at the base, 1–7 cm (0.39–2.76 in) long, 0.2–18 cm (0.079–7.087 in) wide, margins smooth or toothed. The capitula are in clusters of 40-100 flowers on long or occasionally short branches near the top of the plant and the involucre 1–1.5 cm (0.39–0.59 in) long. The corolla has 5 lobes, 5–7 mm (0.20–0.28 in) long, glandular with occasional soft, weak, thin hairs, rarely smooth. Flowering occurs from May to October and the fruit is dry, one-seeded, 2.5–3.5 mm (0.098–0.138 in) long, silky with flattened hairs and ribbed.

== Taxonomy and naming ==
Streptoglossa bubakii was first described by Karel Domin as Pterigeron bubakii. In 1981 Clyde Robert Dunlop changed the name to Streptoglossa bubakii and the description was published in Journal of the Adelaide Botanic Garden. The specific epithet (bubakii) was named after the botanist František Bubák.

== Distribution and habitat ==
This streptoglossa grows usually in areas near clay plains in Queensland, Western Australia and the Northern Territory.
