= Pluchea lanceolata =

Scientific classification
- Kingdom: Plantae
- Clade: Tracheophytes
- Clade: Angiosperms
- Clade: Eudicots
- Clade: Asterids
- Order: Asterales
- Family: Asteraceae
- Genus: Pluchea
- Species: P. lanceolata

Binomial name
- Pluchea lanceolata (DC.) C.B.Clarke

Synonyms
- Berthelotia lanceolata DC.; Berthelotia lanceolata var. senegalensis DC.; Conyza proteiformis Perr. ex DC.; Conyza rubra Buch.-Ham. ex DC.; Pluchea lanceolata (DC.) Oliv. & Hiern; Saussurea mucronata Spreng. ex DC.

Species of plant

Pluchea lanceolata, the rasna or rasana, is a species of flowering plant in the family Asteraceae. It is disjunctly distributed in Africa; Senegal, Chad, and Tanzania, and Asia; Iran, Afghanistan, Pakistan, the western Himalayas, and India. A perennial herb, it is considered a noxious weed by agriculturalists, and is used in Ayurveda and Tibetan traditional medicines.
