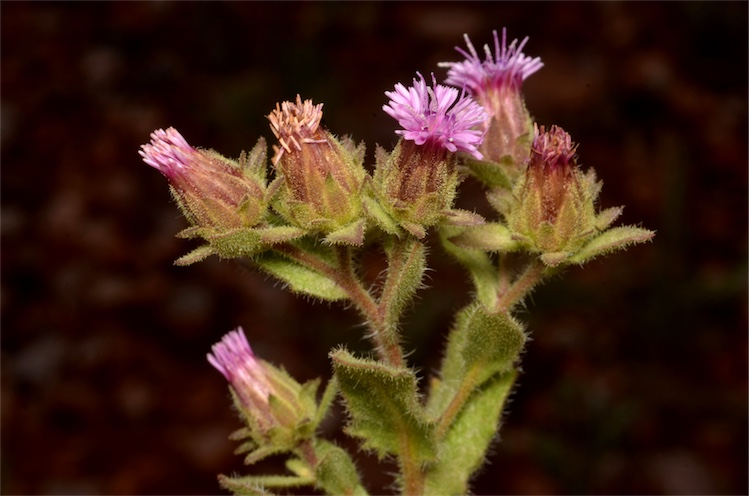

Scientific classification
- Kingdom: Plantae
- Clade: Tracheophytes
- Clade: Angiosperms
- Clade: Eudicots
- Clade: Asterids
- Order: Asterales
- Family: Asteraceae
- Genus: Streptoglossa
- Species: S. decurrens

Binomial name
- Streptoglossa decurrens (DC.) Dunlop

= Streptoglossa decurrens =

Species of flowering plant

Streptoglossa decurrens is a species of flowering plant in the family Asteraceae. It grows in Queensland, Western Australia and the Northern Territory. It is an upright, aromatic perennial herb or shrub with pink-purplish or reddish purple flowers.

== Description ==
Streptoglossa decurrens is a shrub growing to 70 cm (28 in) high. The leaves and branches are strongly fragrant, sticky and covered with soft, weak, thin hairs to long, soft, straight hairs and thickly glandular. The stems are upright leafy, older branches maybe leafless. The leaves are decurrent, elliptic, oblong or rarely oblong-lance shaped, leaves of main branches and stems 2–6 cm (0.79–2.36 in) long, 0.8–2.3 cm (0.31–0.91 in) wide, margins smooth or toothed. The capitula are usually in a corymb cluster on lateral branches of 45-80 florets and the involucre 0.8–1.4 cm (0.31–0.55 in) long. The pink-purple or red-purple corolla has 5 lobes, 6–7 mm (0.24–0.28 in) long, smooth and usually not glandular. Flowering occurs from July to November and the fruit is dry, one-seeded, 2–2.5 mm (0.079–0.098 in) long, silky with flattened hairs.

== Taxonomy and naming ==
Streptoglossa decurrens was first described by Augustin Pyramus de Candolle as Erigeron decurrens. In 1981 Clyde Robert Dunlop changed the name to Streptoglossa decurrens and the description was published in Journal of the Adelaide Botanic Garden. The specific epithet (decurrens) refers to the leaves .

== Distribution and habitat ==
This species is found growing on rocky soils and hillsides, creek beds and clay depressions in Queensland, Western Australia and the Northern Territory.
