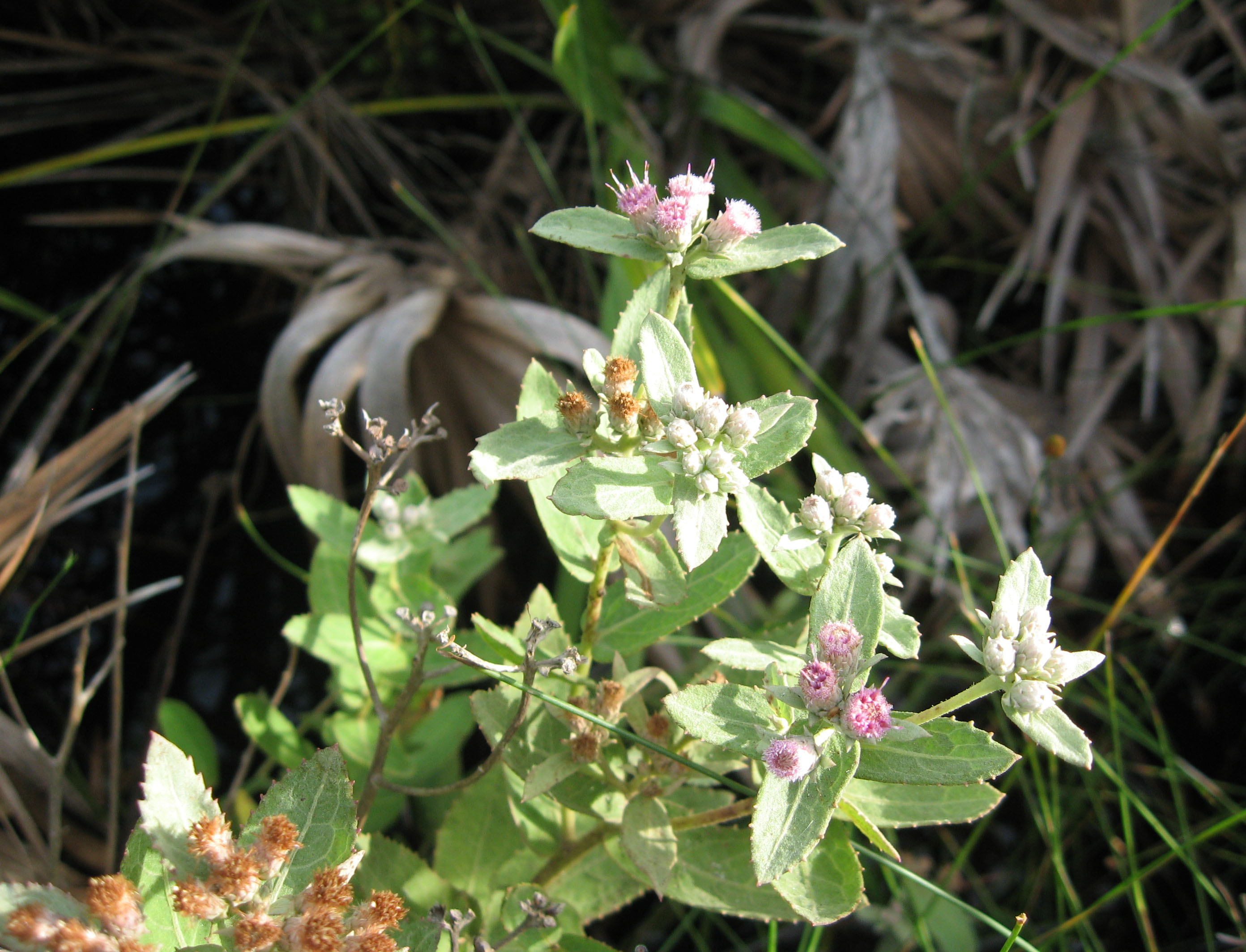

Scientific classification
- Kingdom: Plantae
- Clade: Tracheophytes
- Clade: Angiosperms
- Clade: Eudicots
- Clade: Asterids
- Order: Asterales
- Family: Asteraceae
- Genus: Pluchea
- Species: P. baccharis

Binomial name
- Pluchea baccharis (Miller) Pruski

= Pluchea baccharis =

Species of flowering plant

Pluchea baccharis, commonly called rosy camphorweed, is a species of flowering plant in the family Asteraceae. It is native to the coastal plain of the Southeastern United States, Mexico, Central America, and the Bahamas. It is found in wet savannas, marshes, and flatwoods.

It is a perennial that produces pink-purple flowers from June to July.
