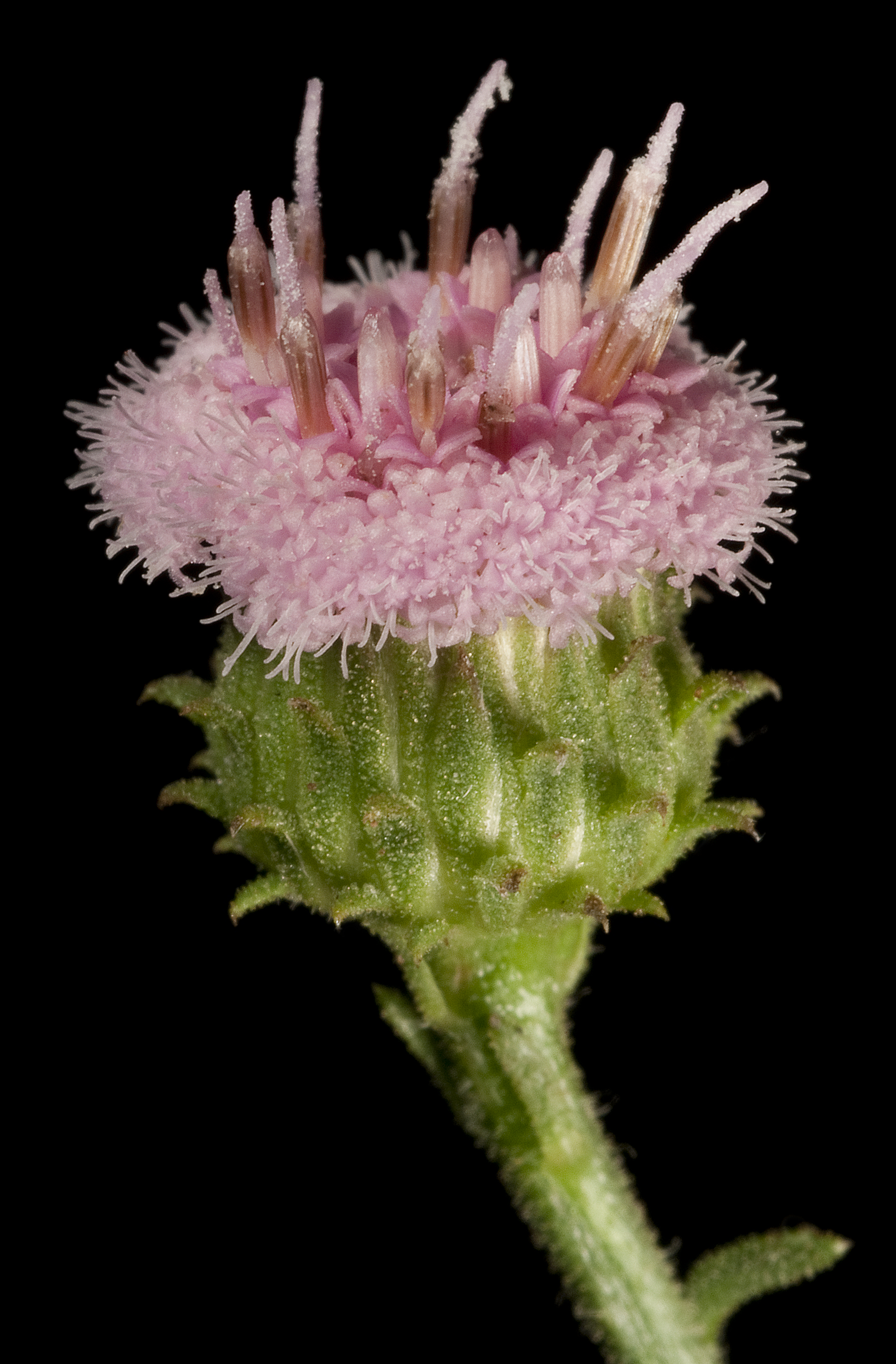

Scientific classification
- Kingdom: Plantae
- Clade: Tracheophytes
- Clade: Angiosperms
- Clade: Eudicots
- Clade: Asterids
- Order: Asterales
- Family: Asteraceae
- Genus: Pluchea
- Species: P. dentex

Binomial name
- Pluchea dentex Benth.

= Pluchea dentex =

Species of flowering plant

Pluchea dentex is a plant in the Asteraceae family, first described in 1867 by George Bentham, from specimens collected in Queensland by Robert Brown at Broad Sound and Thirsty Sound, by Ferdinand von Mueller at the source of the Gilbert River, and one by Eugene Fitzalan at Port Denison.

It is found in New South Wales, South Australia, Western Australia, Queensland and the Northern Territory.
