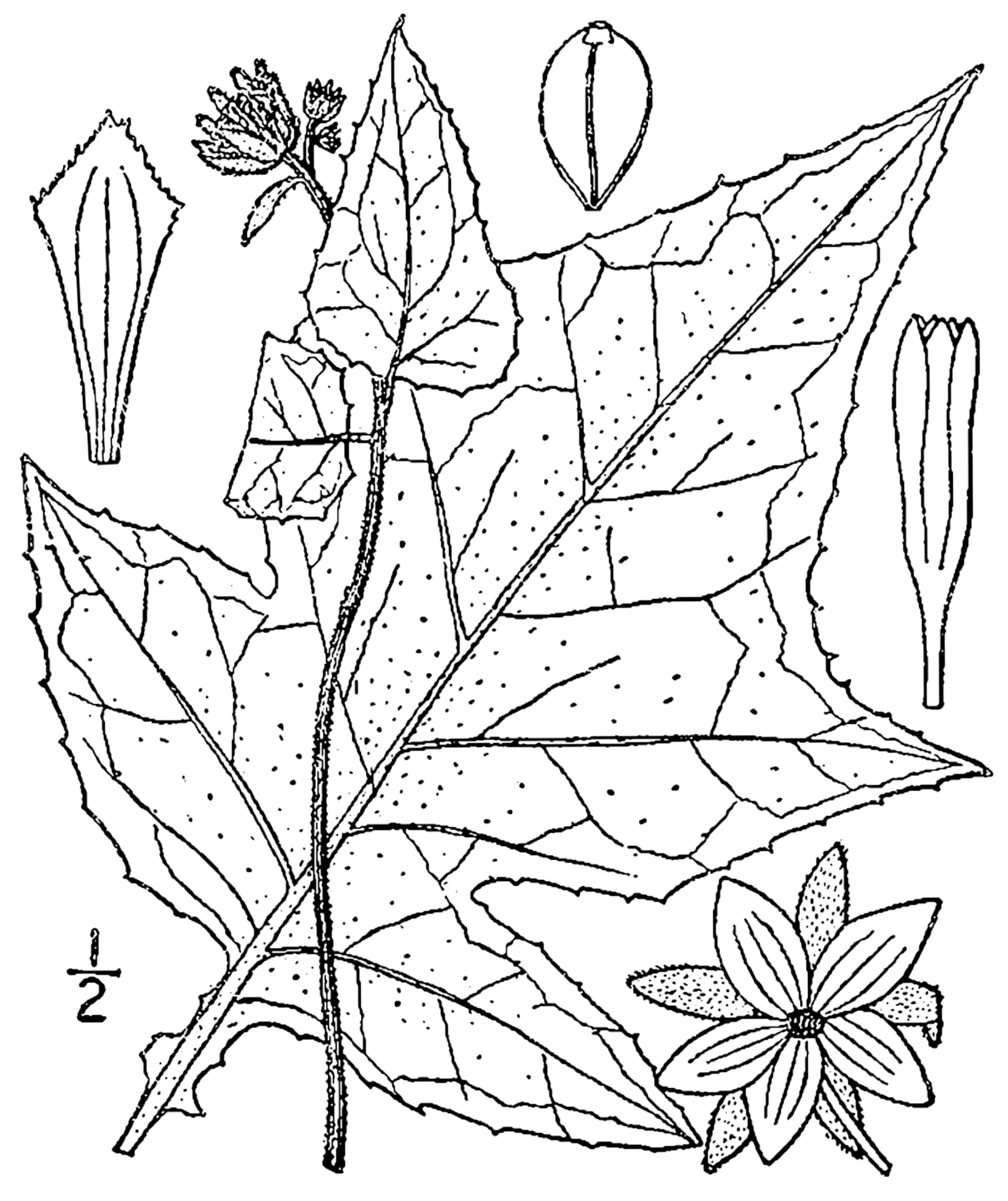
- 1913 illustration

Scientific classification
- Kingdom: Plantae
- Clade: Embryophytes
- Clade: Tracheophytes
- Clade: Spermatophytes
- Clade: Angiosperms
- Clade: Eudicots
- Clade: Asterids
- Order: Asterales
- Family: Asteraceae
- Genus: Polymnia
- Species: P. canadensis

Binomial name
- Polymnia canadensis L. 1753

Synonyms
- Polymnia radiata (A.Gray) Small

= Polymnia canadensis =

Species of flowering plant

Polymnia canadensis, commonly known as whiteflower leafcup, is a flowering perennial plant in the family Asteraceae. It is native to eastern North America from Ontario south to Alabama and from Kansas, Oklahoma, and Minnesota east to North Carolina, Vermont and Connecticut. It is considered endangered in the last three states. It is typically found in moist forests over calcareous rocks.

== Description ==
Polymnia canadensis, commonly known as "bears foot" or "small-flowered leafcup", is more easily identified by features other than the small flowers which are present only in the late summer. The plant reaches a height of 1.5 metres (4.9 ft) and blooms May to October. Often it grows in stands of several plants clustered together. The leaves vary in shape from deeply lobed leaves at the lower part of the plant to the simple leaves at the upper part of the plant (see photo). The sap is clear, sticky and pleasantly fragrant.

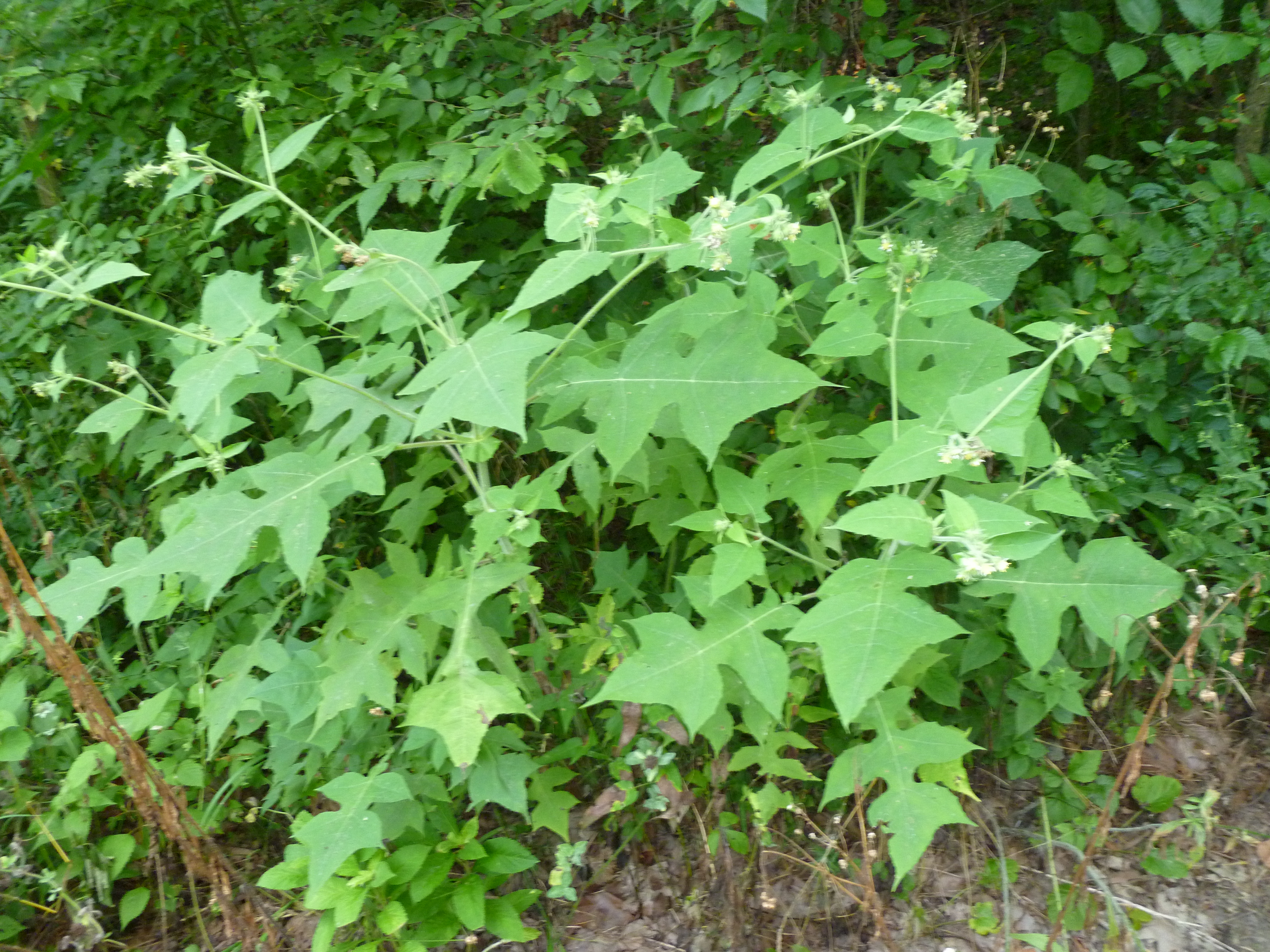
Entire plant

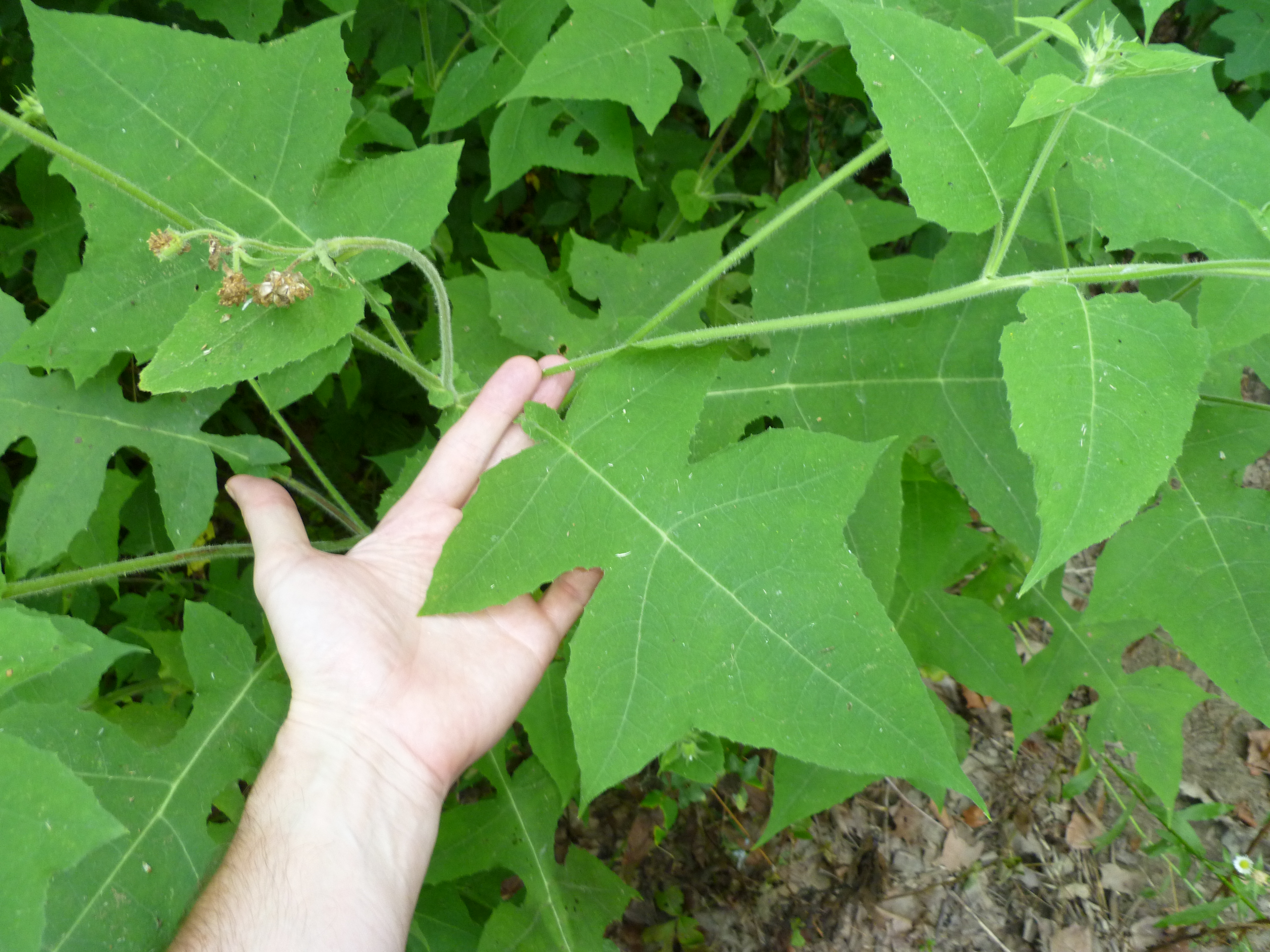
Leaves

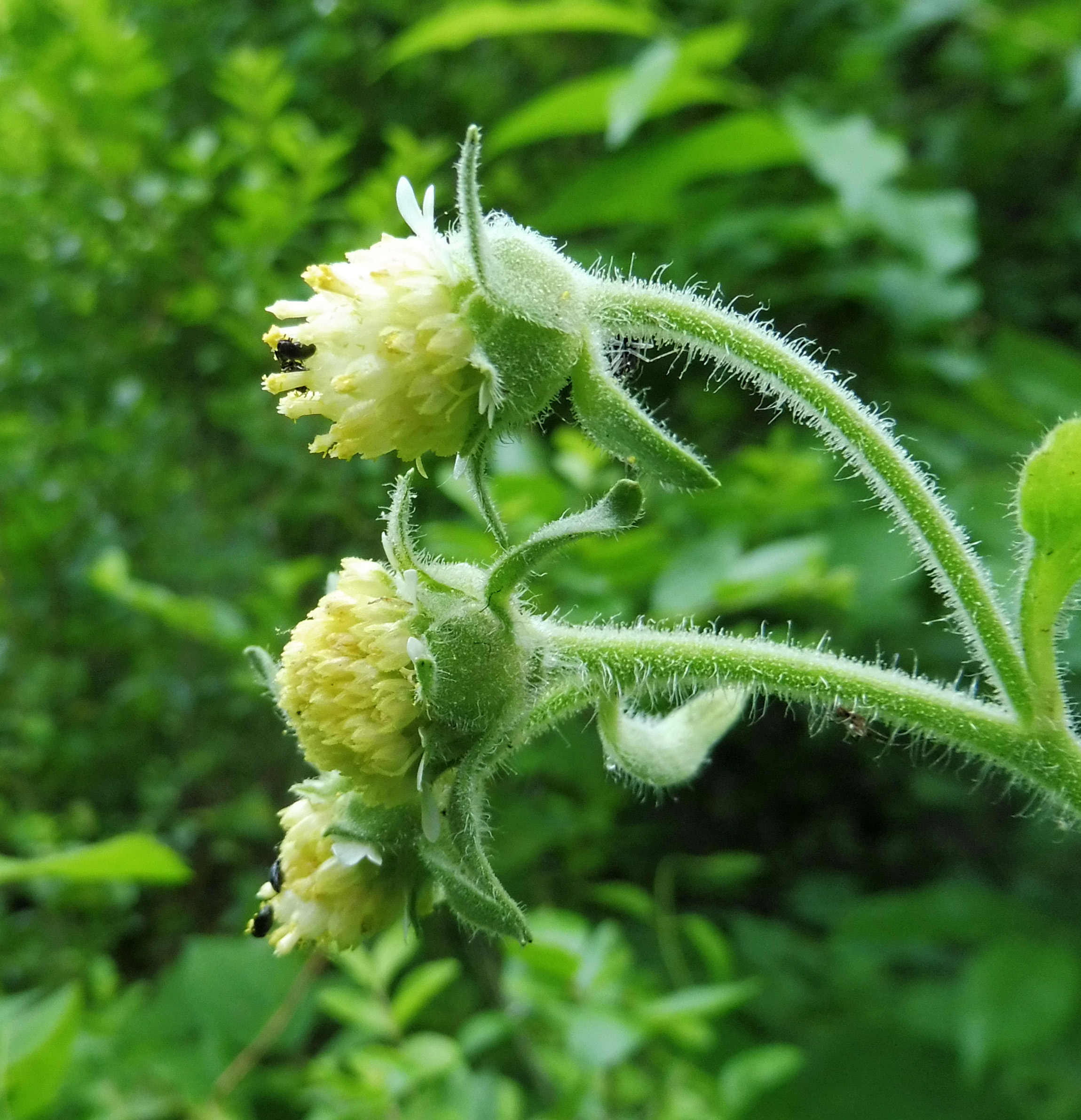
Flowers
