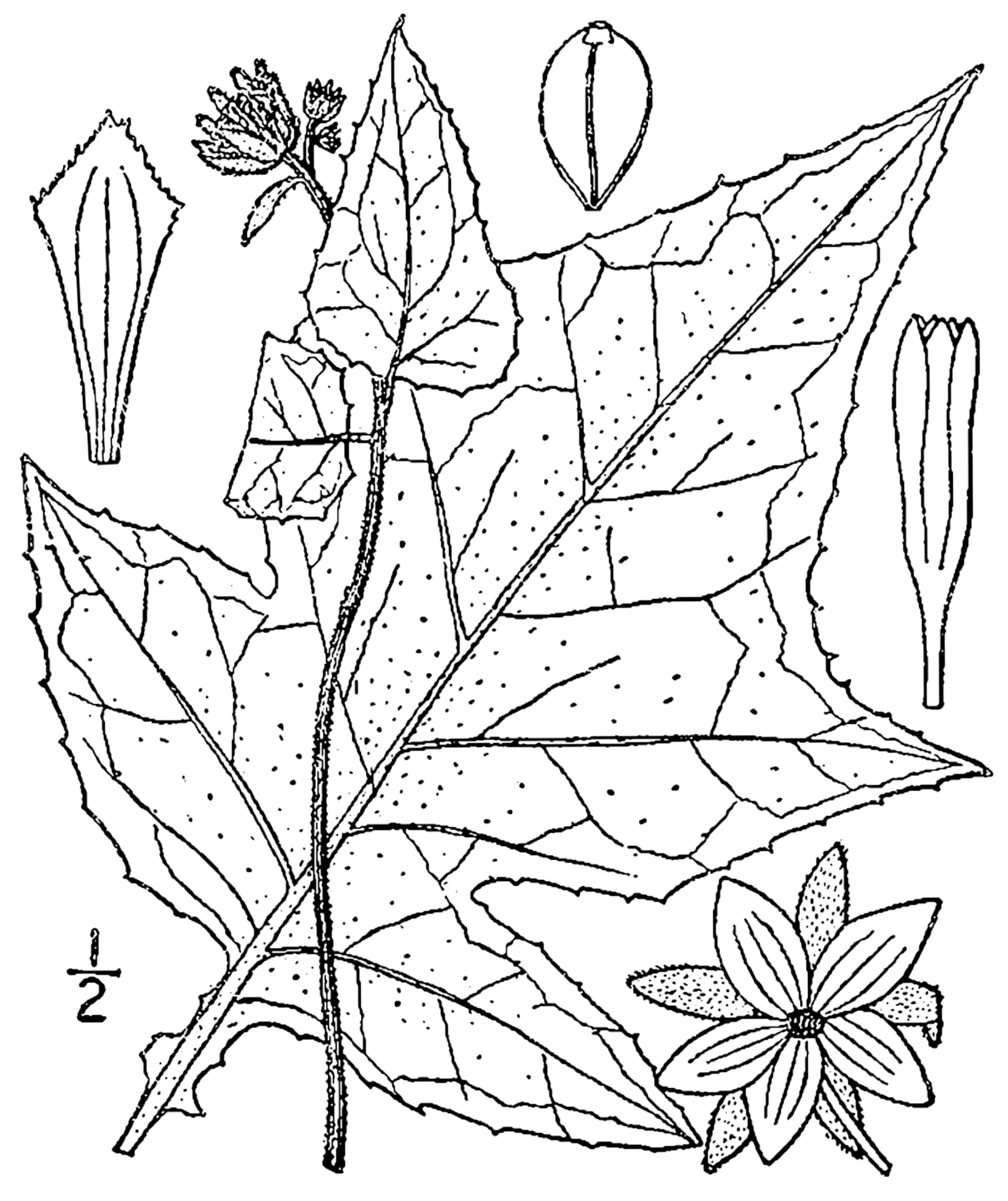
- Pale-flowered leafcup (Polymnia canadensis)

Scientific classification
- Kingdom: Plantae
- Clade: Tracheophytes
- Clade: Angiosperms
- Clade: Eudicots
- Clade: Asterids
- Order: Asterales
- Family: Asteraceae
- Subfamily: Asteroideae
- Tribe: Polymnieae (H.Rob.) Panero
- Genus: Polymnia; Kalm

Type species
- Polymnia canadensis L.

Synonyms
- Alymnia Neck.; Polymniastrum Lam.

= Polymnia =

Genus of flowering plants

Polymnia is a genus of American plants in the sunflower family. It is the only genus in the tribe Polymnieae. Several species are known by the common name leafcup.

Species

- Polymnia aspera (Mart.) Mart. ex DC. – Mexico
- Polymnia canadensis L. – Ontario, much of eastern + central United States
- Polymnia cocuyensis Cuatrec. – Boyacá in Colombia
- Polymnia cossatotensis Pittman & V.M.Bates – Arkansas
- Polymnia johnbeckii D.Estes – Tennessee
- Polymnia laevigata Beadle – MO KY TN AL GA FL
- Polymnia quichensis J.M.Coult. – Costa Rica, Guatemala
- Polymnia sonchifolia Poepp. – Bolivia

Formerly included

Numerous species now in other genera: Axiniphyllum Berlandiera Didelta Guizotia Melampodium Montanoa Rumfordia Smallanthus Sphagneticola Unxia
