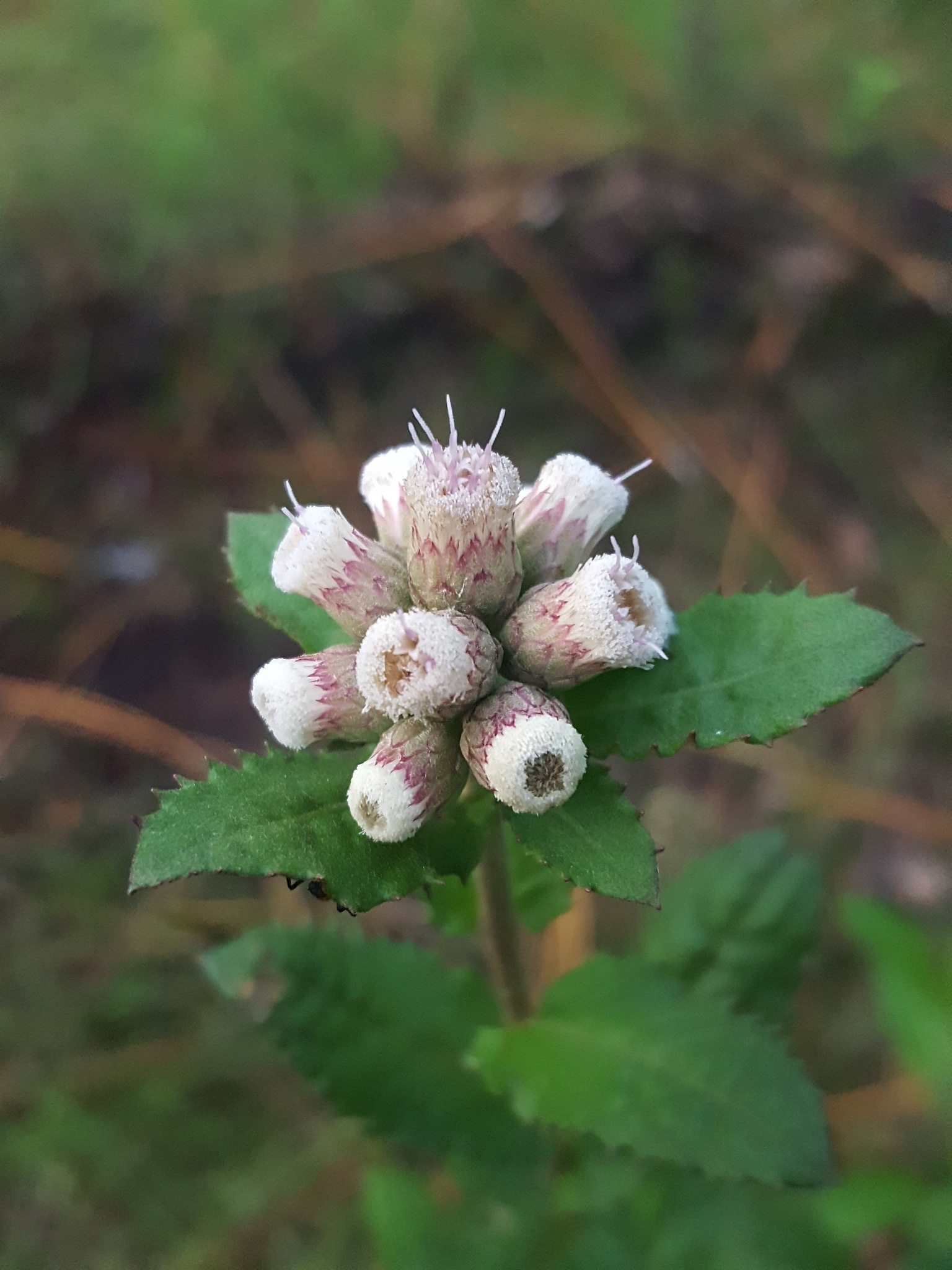

Conservation status
- Secure (NatureServe)"NatureServe Explorer 2.0". explorer.natureserve.org. Retrieved 2025-09-26.

Scientific classification
- Kingdom: Plantae
- Clade: Tracheophytes
- Clade: Angiosperms
- Clade: Eudicots
- Clade: Asterids
- Order: Asterales
- Family: Asteraceae
- Genus: Pluchea
- Species: P. foetida

Binomial name
- Pluchea foetida (L.) DC.

Synonyms
- Pluchea imbricata (Kearney) Nash

= Pluchea foetida =

Plant in the dandelion family

Pluchea foetida, also known as stinking camphorweed and stinking fleabane, is a perennial member of the family Asteraceae found in the United States. There are multiple variations of P. foetida, including: Pluchea foetida var. foetida and Pluchea foetida var. imbricata.

== Description ==
Pluchea foetida stands at a height between 40 and 100 centimeters (approximately 1.31 to 3.28 feet). The stems are glandular and commonly dark purple in color. The leaves are oblong to elliptic in shape and reach a length between 3 and 10 centimeters (approximately 1.18 to 3.94 inches).

When inflorescence occurs, from July to October, corollas are white to yellow or pink in color.

== Distribution and habitat ==
Pluchea foetida's native range within the United States extends from New Jersey south to Florida and westward to Texas.

Within this range P. foetida is categorized as being both an obligate and facultative wetland species. It can be found in habitat types such as environments that experience seasonal wetness, dishes, and freshwater wetlands.
