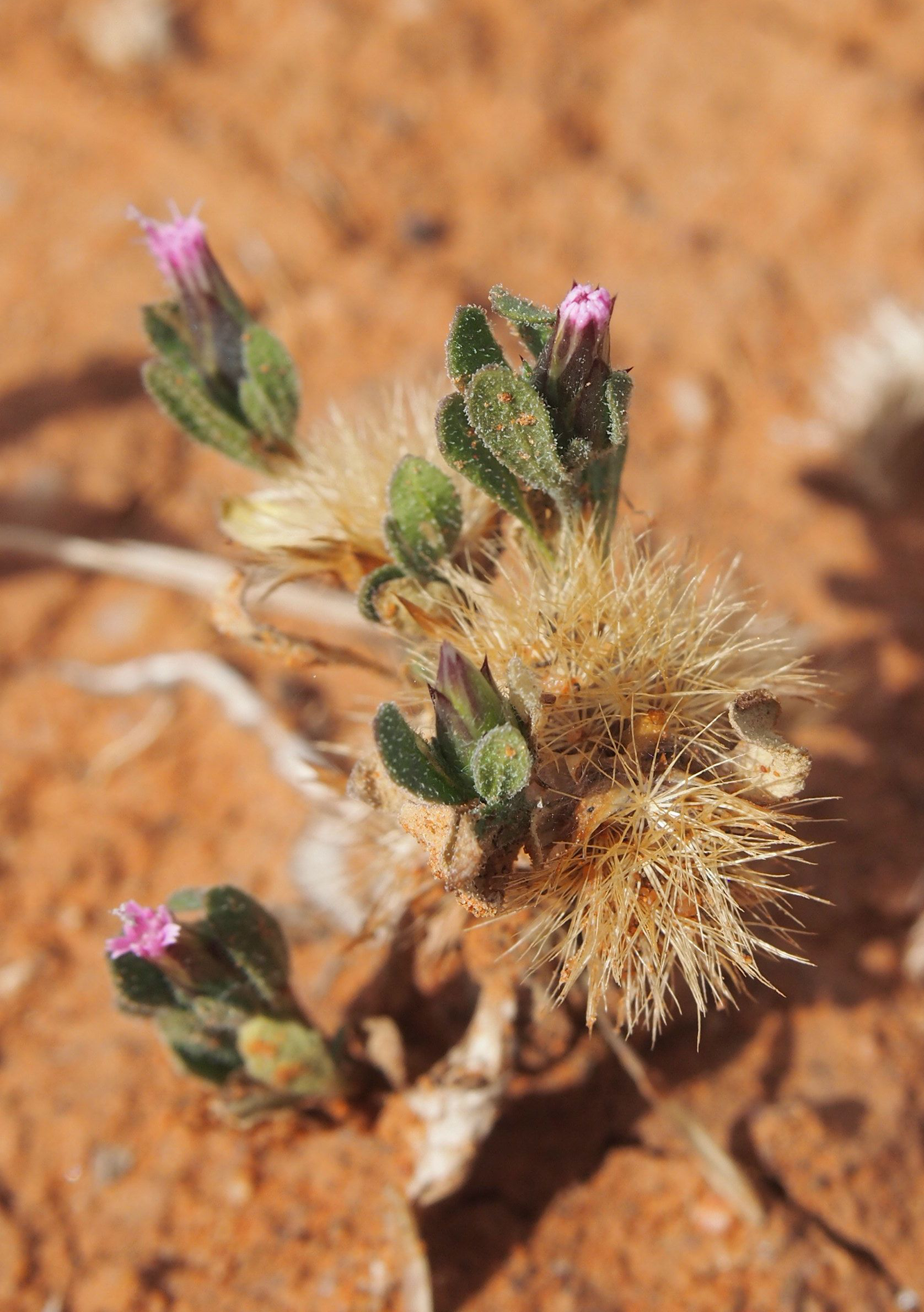

Scientific classification
- Kingdom: Plantae
- Clade: Tracheophytes
- Clade: Angiosperms
- Clade: Eudicots
- Clade: Asterids
- Order: Asterales
- Family: Asteraceae
- Genus: Streptoglossa
- Species: S. adscendens

Binomial name
- Streptoglossa adscendens (Benth.) Dunlop

= Streptoglossa adscendens =

Desert daisy

Species of flowering plant

Streptoglossa adscendens, commonly known as desert daisy, is a species of flowering plant in the family Asteraceae and grows in all mainland states of Australia with the exception of Victoria. It is a ground cover, upright or ascending perennial or annual herb with purple or pink flowers.

== Description ==
Streptoglossa adscendens is a short-lived, leafy, many branched perennial or prostrate herb to 40 cm (16 in) high with faintly aromatic, glandular leaves and upright stems covered in soft, thin hairs. The leaves are oblong to lance shaped, rarely spoon shaped, 1–5 cm (0.39–1.97 in) long, 0.1–1.7 mm (0.0039–0.0669 in) wide, narrowing gradually at the base, margins smooth or toothed and ending in a point. The flowers are borne on a short peduncle or almost sessile usually in clusters near the apex of leafy branches, consisting of 20-40 pink florets, involucre 0.7–1.1 cm (0.28–0.43 in) long, enclosed by a distinctive whorl of 3 or 4 leaves 0.5–1.5 cm (0.20–0.59 in) long, bracts purplish or green, smooth or with soft hairs. Flowering occurs from March to October and the fruit is dry, one-seeded, ribbed, 2–3 mm (0.079–0.118 in) long and densely covered with silky, flattened hairs.

== Taxonomy and naming ==
Streptoglossa adscendens was first described George Bentham in Flora Australiensis as Pterigeron adscendens. In 1981 Clyde Robert Dunlop changed the name to Streptoglossa adscendens and the description was published in Journal of the Adelaide Botanic Garden. The specific epithet (adscendens) means "ascending".

== Distribution and habitat ==
Desert daisy grows in a variety of habitats including granite hills and the edges of salt lakes in rocky, clay soils in all Australian mainland states other than Victoria.
