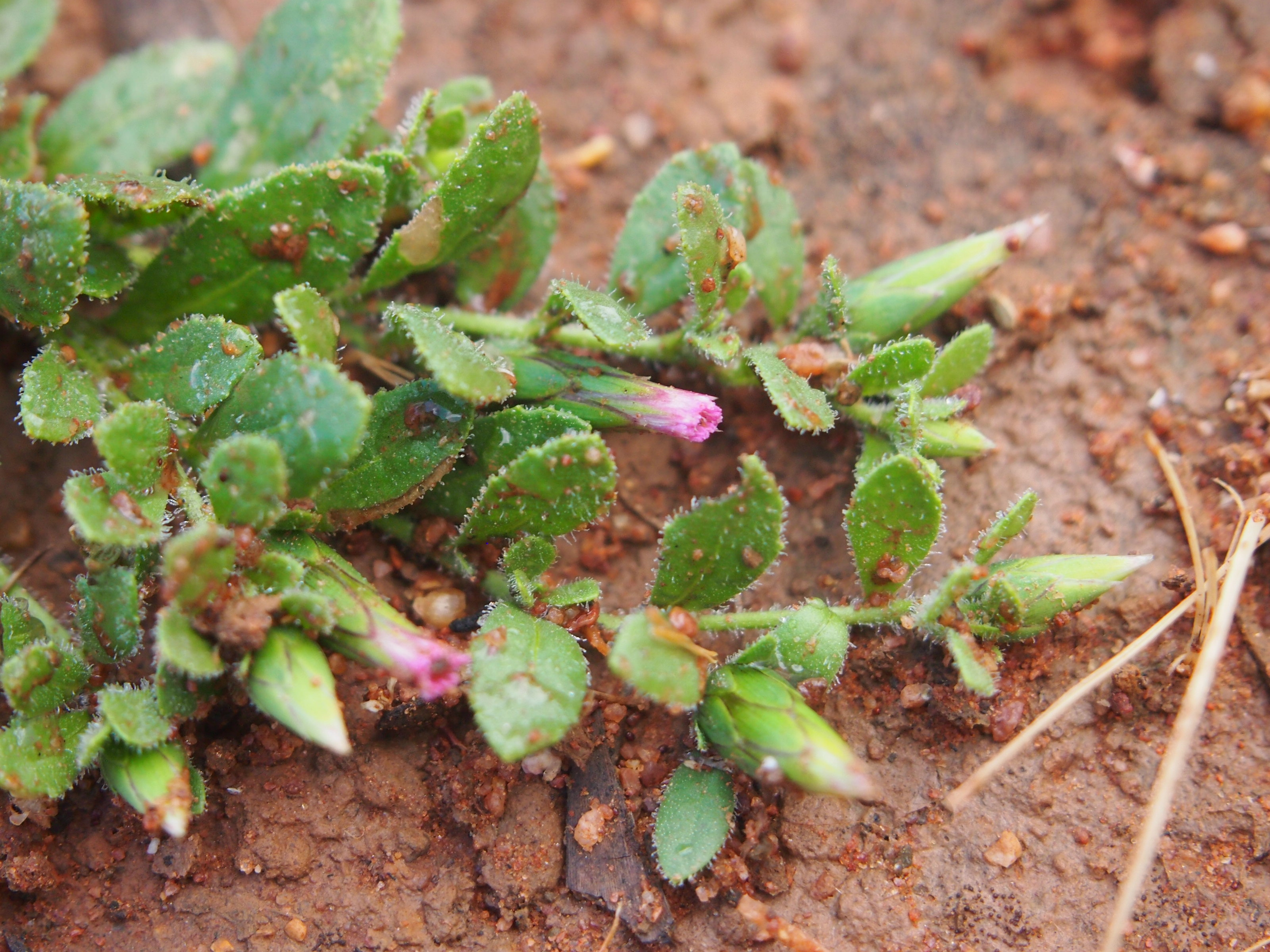

Scientific classification
- Kingdom: Plantae
- Clade: Tracheophytes
- Clade: Angiosperms
- Clade: Eudicots
- Clade: Asterids
- Order: Asterales
- Family: Asteraceae
- Genus: Streptoglossa
- Species: S. cylindriceps

Binomial name
- Streptoglossa cylindriceps (J.M.Black) Dunlop

= Streptoglossa cylindriceps =

Species of flowering plant

Streptoglossa cylindriceps is a species of flowering plant in the family Asteraceae and grows in Western Australia, South Australia and the Northern Territory. It is a ground cover or ascending perennial or annual herb with bluish purple or pink flowers.

== Description ==
Streptoglossa cylindriceps is a short-lived, perennial or prostrate herb with faintly aromatic, glandular leaves and stems covered in soft, thin hairs. The leaves are oblong to lance shaped to spoon or oval shaped, 4–35 mm (0.16–1.38 in) long, 1–20 mm (0.039–0.787 in) wide, narrowing gradually at the base, margins smooth or toothed and pointed or blunt at the apex. The flowers are borne singly on either long or short branches consisting of 35-80 pink, lilac or blue-purple florets, involucre 15–23 mm (0.59–0.91 in) long and the bracts purplish or green. Flowering occurs most months of the year and the fruit is dry, one-seeded, curved, ribbed, 3.5–5 mm (0.14–0.20 in) long and densely covered with silky, flattened hairs.

== Taxonomy and naming ==
Streptoglossa cylindriceps was first formally described in 1981 by Clyde Robert Dunlop and the description was published in Journal of the Adelaide Botanic Garden. The specific epithet (cylindriceps) means "cylinder" and "headed".

== Distribution and habitat ==
This streptoglossa grows in drier regions in a variety of situations and soils including red sand or clay, floodplains, rocky creeks and occasionally flooded swamps.
