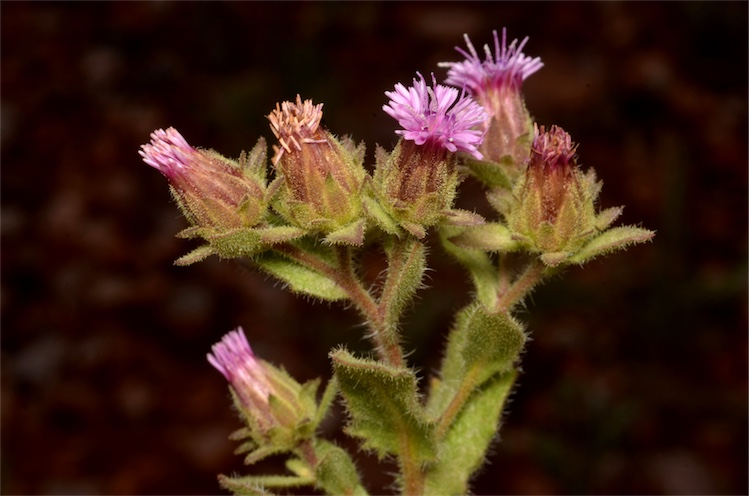
- Streptoglossa decurrens near the Ochre Pits

Scientific classification
- Kingdom: Plantae
- Clade: Tracheophytes
- Clade: Angiosperms
- Clade: Eudicots
- Clade: Asterids
- Order: Asterales
- Family: Asteraceae
- Subfamily: Asteroideae
- Tribe: Inuleae
- Genus: Streptoglossa; Steetz

Type species
- Streptoglossa steetzii F.Muell.

Synonyms
- Erigeron sect. Pterigeron DC.; Pluchea sect. Rhodanthemum F.Muell.; Pterigeron (DC.) Benth.; Streptoglossa Steetz ex F.Muell. isonym

= Streptoglossa =

Genus of plants

Streptoglossa is a genus of flowering plants in the family Asteraceae and is endemic to Australia. Plants in the genus Streptoglossa are aromatic herbs or shrubs with simple leaves, composite flowerheads with 15 to more than 100 fertile florets, the outer florets female and the disc florets bisexual.

== Description ==
Plants in the genus Streptoglossa are shrubs, or annual or perennial herbs, often aromatic, with simple, often glandular leaves. The daisy-like flowers are pink to purple and have 15 to 100 or more fertile florets, the outer florets female with a lobed ligule, and the disc florets bisexual and tube-shaped. There are 3 to 6 rows of overlapping involucral bracts at the base of the heads. The fruit is a hairy achene, the pappus with many barbed or feathery bristles.

== Taxonomy ==
The genus Streptoglossa was first formally described by Joachim Steetz, but published in 1863 by Ferdinand von Mueller in the Edinburgh New Philosophical Journal. Mueller used the opportunity of publishing the name, to refer to Steetz as "my lamented friend the late Dr Joachim Steetz of Hamburg, in whom botanical science has lost one of its most able, correct, and philosophical promoters of this age." The genus name means "twisted tongue", probably referring to the bracts that twist when dry.

=== Species list ===
The following is a list of species of Streptoglossa accepted by the Australian Plant Census as at June 2022:

- Streptoglossa adscendens (Benth.) Dunlop
- Streptoglossa bubakii (Domin) Dunlop
- Streptoglossa cylindriceps (J.M.Black) Dunlop
- Streptoglossa decurrens (DC.) Dunlop
- Streptoglossa liatroides (Turcz.) Dunlop
- Streptoglossa macrocephala (F.Muell.) Dunlop
- Streptoglossa odora (F.Muell.) Dunlop
- Streptoglossa tenuiflora Dunlop
