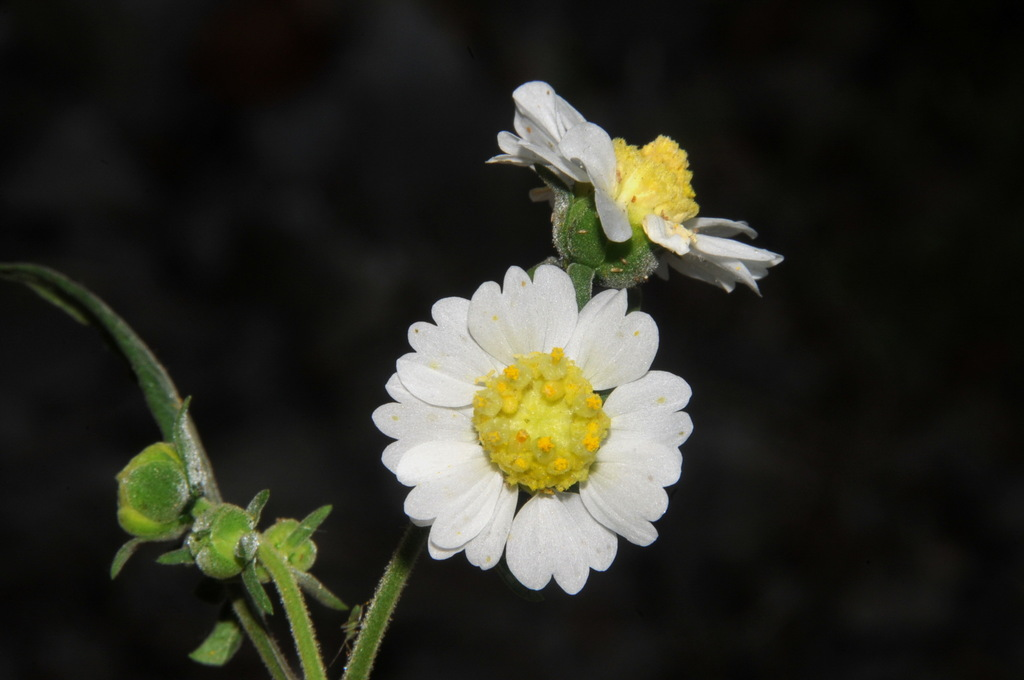
- Polymnia johnbeckii in bloom
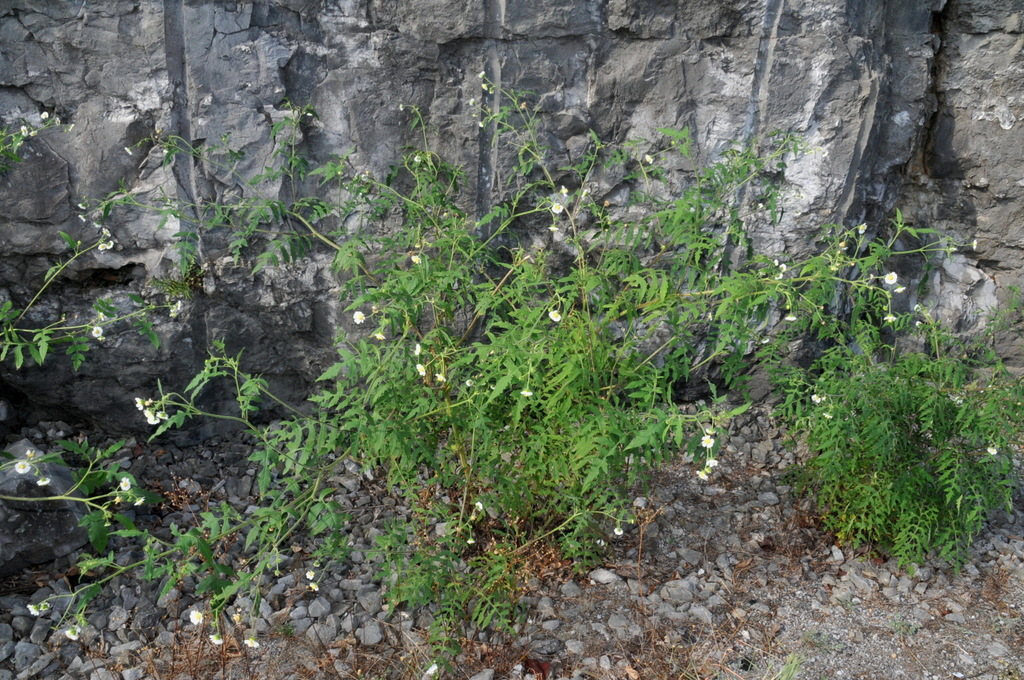

Conservation status
- Critically Imperiled (NatureServe)

Scientific classification
- Kingdom: Plantae
- Clade: Embryophytes
- Clade: Tracheophytes
- Clade: Spermatophytes
- Clade: Angiosperms
- Clade: Eudicots
- Clade: Asterids
- Order: Asterales
- Family: Asteraceae
- Genus: Polymnia
- Species: P. johnbeckii

Binomial name
- Polymnia johnbeckii D.Estes

= Polymnia johnbeckii =

Species of flowering plant

Polymnia johnbeckii, commonly called Beck's leafcup, is a species of flowering plant in the family of Asteraceae. It is a perennial forb found only in Tennessee It has white/yellow flowers.

== Distribution ==
Polymnia johnbeckii is found in only in the state of Tennessee. Its global conservation status is critically imperiled according to NatureServe per Natureserve.
