= Pluchea glutinosa =

Conservation status
- Extinct (IUCN 3.1)

Scientific classification
- Kingdom: Plantae
- Clade: Tracheophytes
- Clade: Angiosperms
- Clade: Eudicots
- Clade: Asterids
- Order: Asterales
- Family: Asteraceae
- Genus: Pluchea
- Species: †P. glutinosa

Binomial name
- †Pluchea glutinosa Balf.f.

Species of plant

Pluchea glutinosa was a species of flowering plant in the sunflower family that was endemic to the Island of Socotra in the Indian Ocean, part of the Republic of Yemen.

The plant has not been observed in the wild since the 19th Century and is presumed extinct.
