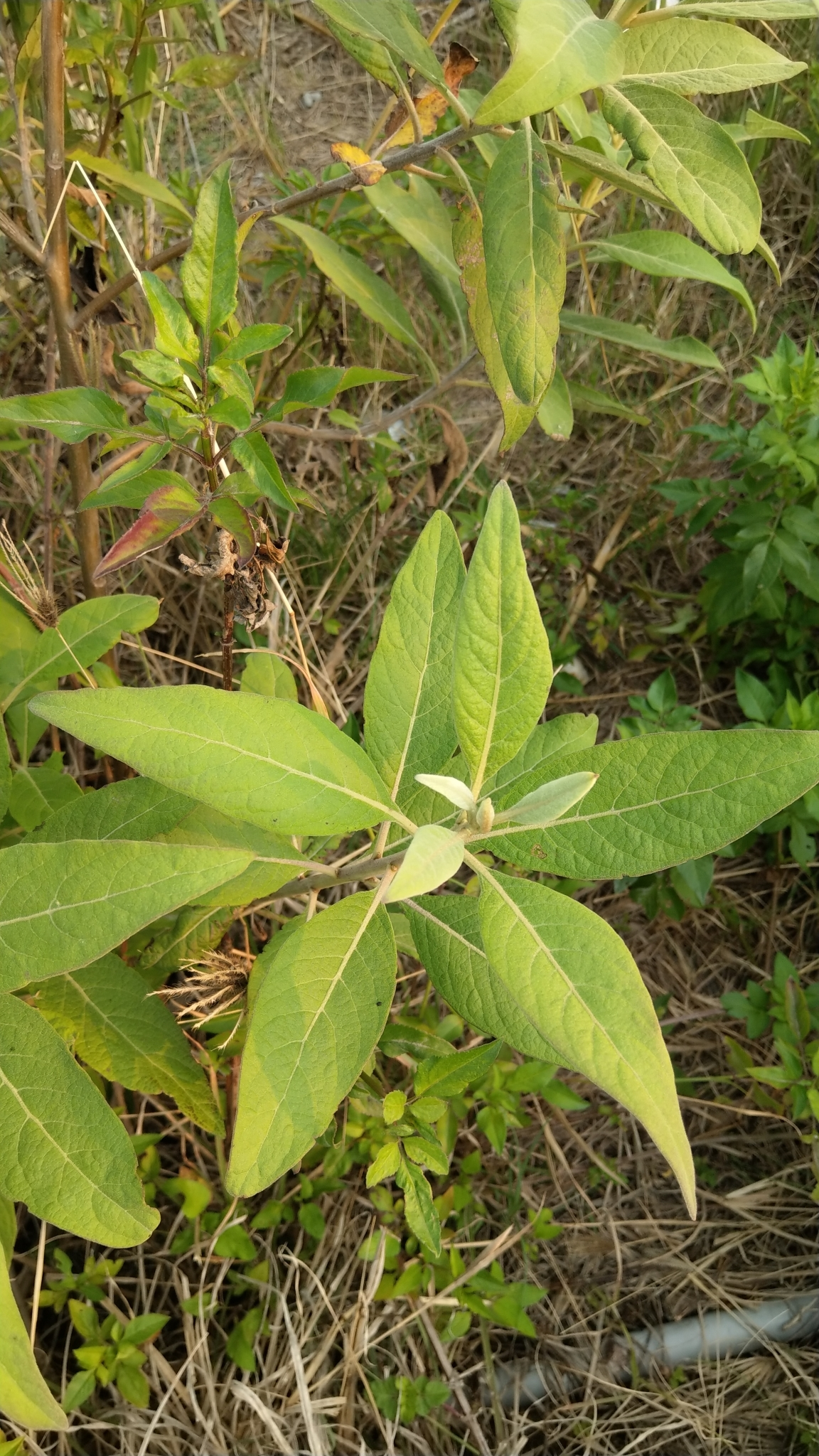

Scientific classification
- Kingdom: Plantae
- Clade: Tracheophytes
- Clade: Angiosperms
- Clade: Eudicots
- Clade: Asterids
- Order: Asterales
- Family: Asteraceae
- Genus: Pluchea
- Species: P. carolinensis

Binomial name
- Pluchea carolinensis (Jacq.) G. Don

Synonyms
- Conyza carolinensis Jacq.; Pluchea symphytifolia (Gillis 1977)

= Pluchea carolinensis =

Species of plant

Pluchea carolinensis is a plant in the genus Pluchea.

== Description ==
Pluchea carolinensis is a plant from the genus Pluchea, the species was first described by the Scottish botanist George Don. It is a shrub that can grow up to 2.5m tall and has large leaves, which are longer than wide.

== Names ==
This species has many common names, reflecting its widespread use as a medicinal plant. In the Spanish Caribbean it is known as salvia blanca, salvia cimarron, salvia del pais, salvia santa, salvia olorosa, and salvia real, amongst others, all referring to its resemblance to the European herb sage (Salvia officinalis). Its medicinal properties are alluded to in the English names cure for all, bushy fleabane, and cough bush and the French guerit-tout. Its similarity to tobacco has given rise to the names tabac a jacquot, tabac du diable, and tabac marron.

== Distribution ==
Pluchea carolinensis is common in North, Central and South America as well as the Caribbean, and is naturalized in Florida, Hawaii and some other Pacific islands, and Taiwan. The plant is native to Aruba where it has the status of a protected plant.

== Habitat ==
Pluchea carolinensis is said to grow on both wet and dry soil where it prefers to be in a sunny spot. It is common to be cultivated in gardens in various countries in South and Central America.
