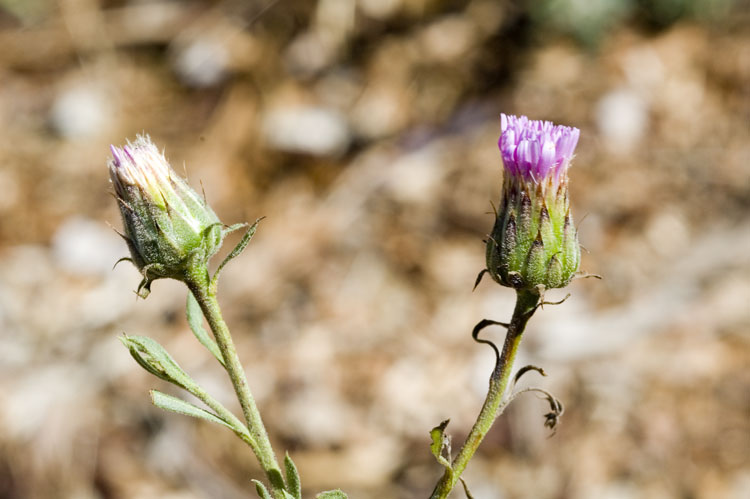

Scientific classification
- Kingdom: Plantae
- Clade: Tracheophytes
- Clade: Angiosperms
- Clade: Eudicots
- Clade: Asterids
- Order: Asterales
- Family: Asteraceae
- Genus: Streptoglossa
- Species: S. liatroides

Binomial name
- Streptoglossa liatroides (Turcz.) Dunlop

= Streptoglossa liatroides =

Wertaloona daisy

Species of flowering plant

Streptoglossa liatroides commonly known as Wertaloona daisy, is a species of flowering plant in the family Asteraceae. It is a low, spreading or upright perennial herb with pink or red to purple flowers. It grows in South Australia, New South Wales, Western Australia and the Northern Territory.

== Description ==
Streptoglossa liatroides is a short-lived, upright or with prostrate stems, annual or perennial herb growing to about 50 cm (20 in) high, and sparsely branched. The leaves and branches are faintly fragrant, and covered with soft, weak, separated thin hairs and glandular. The leaves are oblong-lance shaped or spoon-shaped, 10–50 mm (0.39–1.97 in) long, 2–15 mm (0.079–0.591 in) wide, gradually narrowing at the base, margins smooth or toothed and rounded or pointed at the apex. The "flowers" are borne singly on branches at least 30 mm (1.2 in) long, florets in a group of 50-190, corolla 6–9 mm (0.24–0.35 in) long, glandular and with 5 lobes. Flowering occurs from April to November and the fruit is dry, one-seeded, 2.5–4 mm (0.098–0.157 in) long, ribbed, thickly or sparsely covered in silky, flattened hairs.

== Taxonomy and naming ==
Streptoglossa liatroides was first described by Nicolai Stepanovitch Turczaninow as Erigeron liatroides. In 1981 Clyde Robert Dunlop changed the name to Streptoglossa liatroides and the description was published in Journal of the Adelaide Botanic Garden. The specific epithet (liatroides) means like the genus Liatris.

== Distribution and habitat ==
Wertaloona daisy grows in a variety of soils including coastal limestone, and sometimes on stony flats near sand dunes.
