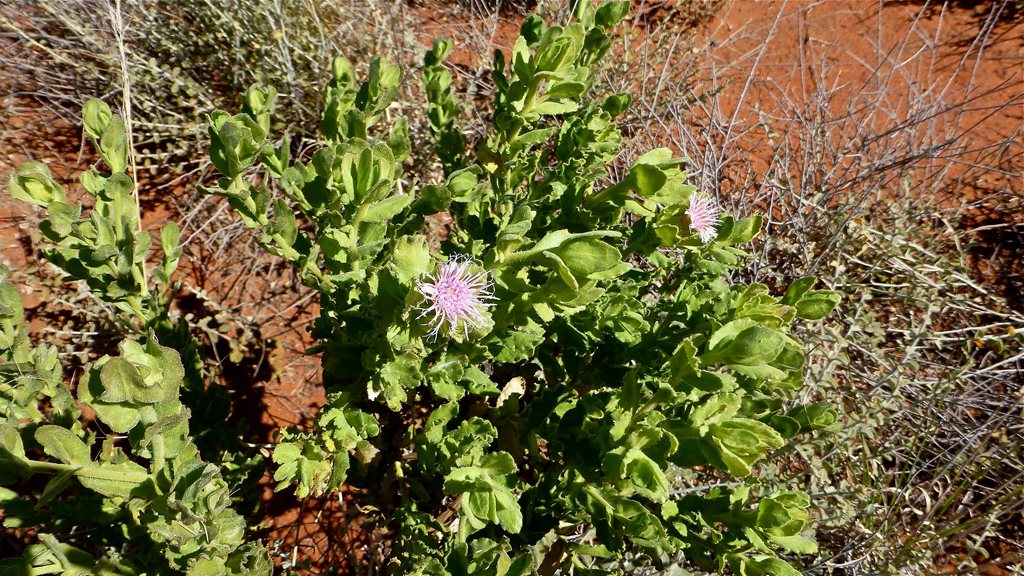

Scientific classification
- Kingdom: Plantae
- Clade: Tracheophytes
- Clade: Angiosperms
- Clade: Eudicots
- Clade: Asterids
- Order: Asterales
- Family: Asteraceae
- Genus: Streptoglossa
- Species: S. macrocephala

Binomial name
- Streptoglossa macrocephala (F.Muell.) Dunlop

= Streptoglossa macrocephala =

Species of flowering plant

Streptoglossa macrocephala is a species of flowering plant in the family Asteraceae. It is a spreading or upright perennial herb with pink to purple flowers. It grows in Queensland, Western Australia and the Northern Territory.

== Description ==
Streptoglossa macrocephala is an upright perennial herb or shrub to 30–100 cm (12–39 in) high. The leaves and branches are strongly fragrant, and covered with soft, weak, separated thin hairs to almost smooth, thickly glandular and occasionally shiny. The leaves are oblong-lance shaped, egg-shaped or elliptic, 10–38 mm (0.39–1.50 in) long, 4–15 mm (0.16–0.59 in) wide, stem clasping or rarely gradually narrowing at the base, margins smooth or toothed or slightly lobed, and rounded or pointed at the apex. The pink to purple "flowers" are sometimes covered by upper leaves, florets in a group of 60-100. Flowering occurs from July to September and the fruit is dry, one-seeded, 3–4.5 mm (0.12–0.18 in) long, ribbed and covered in silky, flattened hairs.

== Taxonomy and naming ==
Streptoglossa macrocephala was first described by Ferdinand von Mueller as Pluchea macrocephala. In 1981 Clyde Robert Dunlop changed the name to Streptoglossa macrocephala and the description was published in Journal of the Adelaide Botanic Garden. The specific epithet (macrocephala) means "large headed".

== Distribution and habitat ==
This streptoglossa grows in red sand, limestone, and dunes of the Tanami Desert in the Northern Territory, the Gibson Desert and Great Sandy Desert of Western Australia. Also scattered locations on rocky or sandy soils from the Kimberley to Shark Bay in Western Australia and from Tennant Creek in the Northern Territory to western Queensland.
