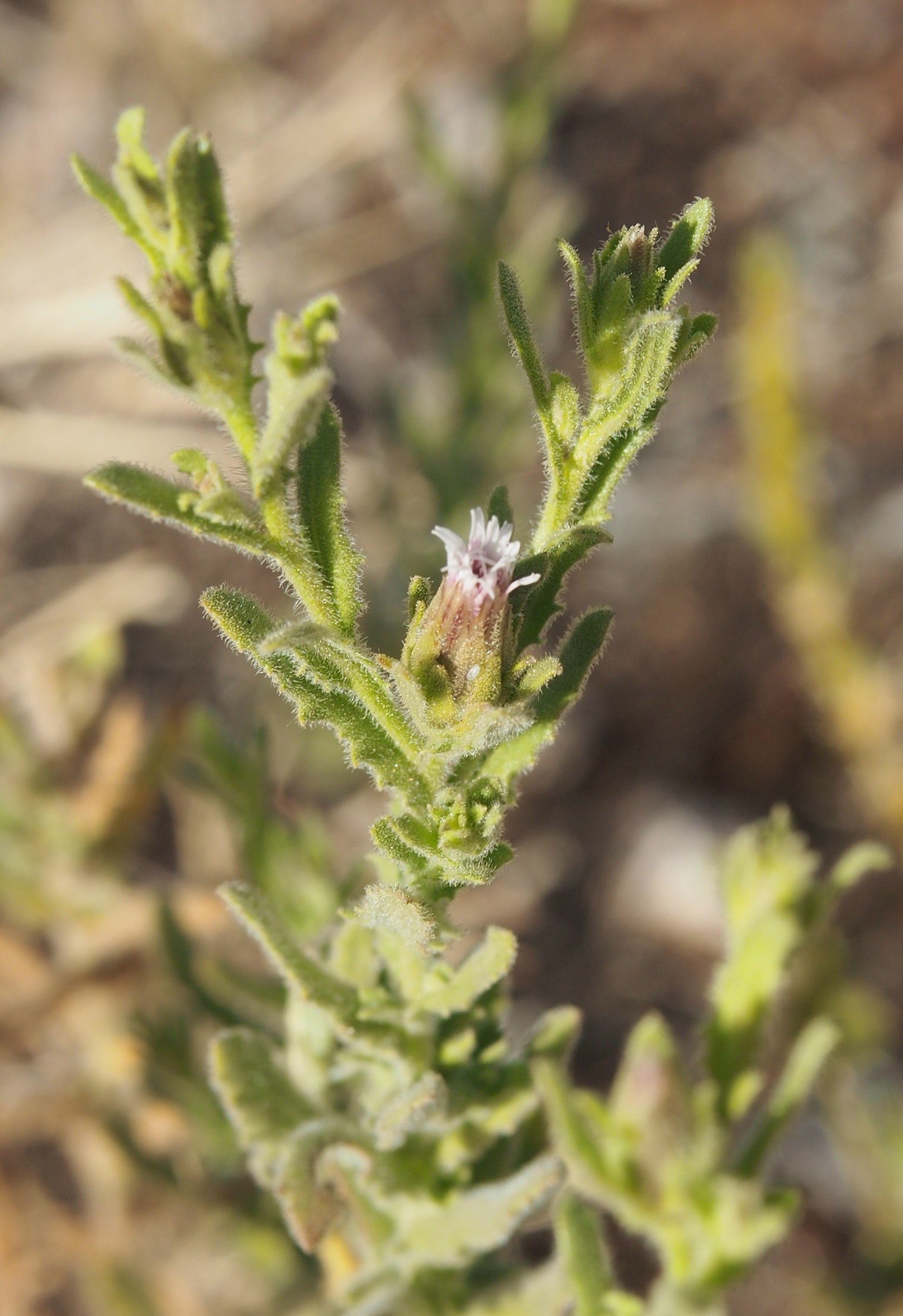

Scientific classification
- Kingdom: Plantae
- Clade: Tracheophytes
- Clade: Angiosperms
- Clade: Eudicots
- Clade: Asterids
- Order: Asterales
- Family: Asteraceae
- Genus: Streptoglossa
- Species: S. odora

Binomial name
- Streptoglossa odora (F.Muell.) Dunlop

= Streptoglossa odora =

Species of flowering plant

Streptoglossa odora is a species of flowering plant in the family Asteraceae. It is a spreading, perennial herb with pink or bluish-purple flowers. It grows in Queensland, Western Australia and the Northern Territory.

== Description ==
Streptoglossa odora is an upright perennial herb to 60 cm (24 in) high. The leaves and branches are strongly fragrant, and covered with soft, weak, separated thin hairs to long, soft hairs and thickly glandular. The leaves of the larger branches are oblong-lance shaped, occasionally linear-shaped, 15–55 mm (0.59–2.17 in) long, 4–15 mm (0.16–0.59 in) wide, decurrent at the base, margins smooth or toothed and pointed at the apex. The pink or blue-purple "flowers" are scattered on variable length branches, and florets in a group of mostly 15-30. Flowering occurs from July to August and the fruit is dry, one-seeded, 2–3 mm (0.079–0.118 in) long and covered in silky, flattened hairs.

== Taxonomy and naming ==
Streptoglossa odora was first described by Ferdinand von Mueller as Pluchea odora. In 1981 Clyde Robert Dunlop changed the name to Streptoglossa odora and the description was published in Journal of the Adelaide Botanic Garden. The specific epithet (odora) means "fragrant".

== Distribution and habitat ==
This streptoglossa grows in open areas of woodland and scrubland on sandy clay as well as saline depressions in northern Australia from the Kimberley to the Northern Territory into western and central Queensland.
