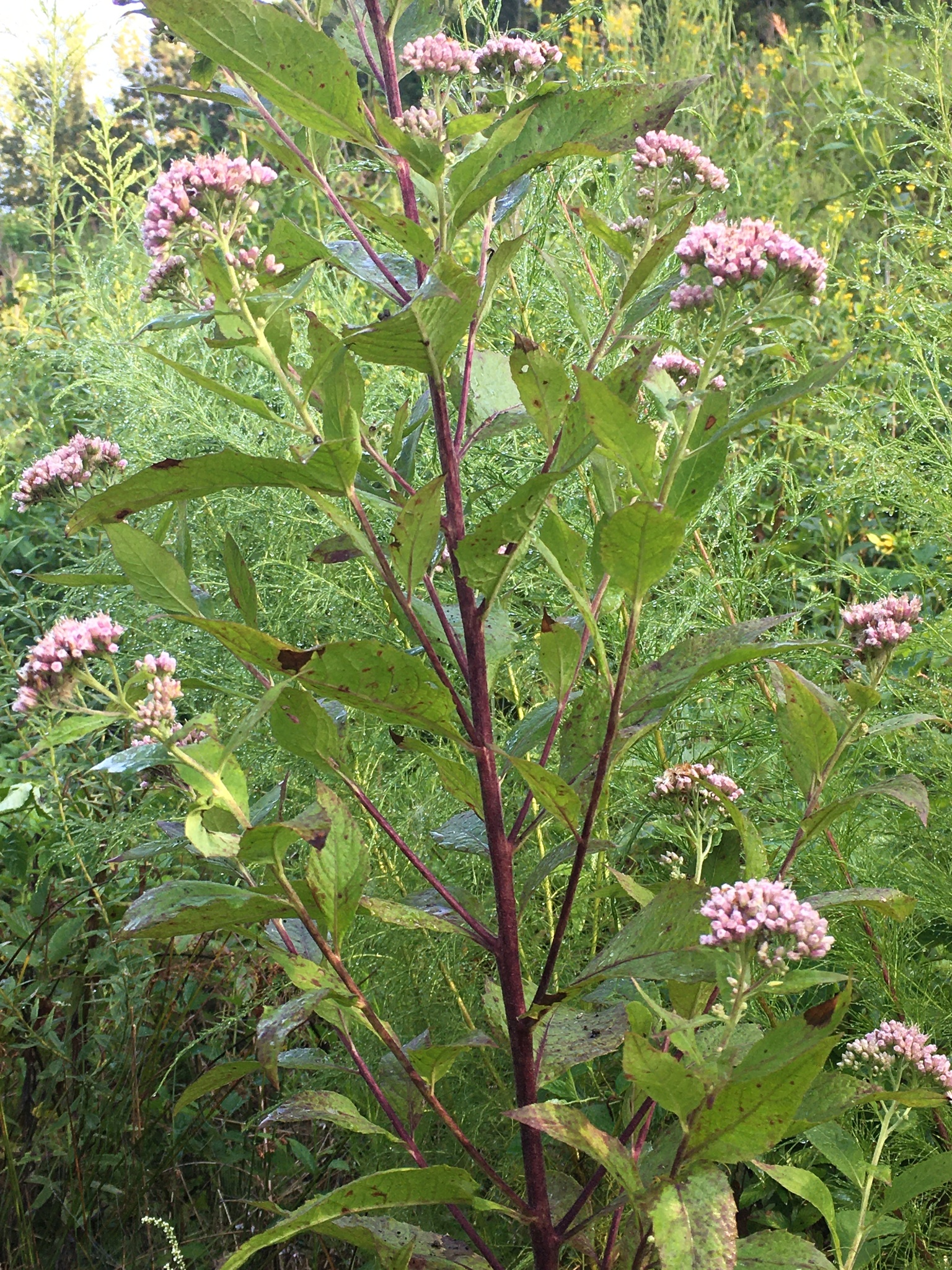

Scientific classification
- Kingdom: Plantae
- Clade: Tracheophytes
- Clade: Angiosperms
- Clade: Eudicots
- Clade: Asterids
- Order: Asterales
- Family: Asteraceae
- Genus: Pluchea
- Species: P. camphorata

Binomial name
- Pluchea camphorata (L.) DC.

= Pluchea camphorata =

Species of flowering plant

Pluchea camphorata, known as camphorweed or marsh-fleabane, is a small flowering herbaceous annual plant of the family Asteraceae.

== Description ==
Pluchea camphorata is a small herbaceous plant that grows approximately 3 ft (0.91 m) tall, with blooms of purple-pink flowers formed in small heads in rounded clusters. The leaves are alternate, serrate, and elliptic to ovate or lance-shaped. The leaves form on short petioles. They have granular, sessile resin globules on the leaves and at the ends of the stems and branches of the plant. This plant's nutlets range from pink to tan. The roots are fibrous.

== Taxonomy ==
Pluchea camphorata is in the family Asteraceae, or Compositae, which is a very diverse family containing approximately 23,000 species. Pluchea is a genus of several species of perennial or annual herbs. They are erect plants, with densely short pubescent, terete to obscurely angled, strictly to freely branched stems. Pluchea have alternate, serrate, the teeth callous-thickened, petiolate to sessile leaves. Pluchea have corymbrose, involucres hemispheric to campanulate, many-flowered, bracts imbricate heads. Pluchea have discoid, perfect, small flowers and small cylindrical, 5 ribbed nutlets. Pluchea have whitish, capillary, minutely, antrorsely barbed pappus bristles. Pluchea rosea have pink corollas, elliptic to elliptic-oblong leaves, and black nutlets. Pluchea foetida have cream corollas and pinkish nutlets. Pluchea purpurascens have pink corollas and pink to tan nutlets. The three species bloom from August to October and bloom in similar habitats. There is doubt about the identity of Pluchea camphorata due to confusion among different botanists.

== Distribution and habitat ==
Pluchea camphorata grows mostly in the eastern United States, anywhere from Florida to Texas and as far north as Michigan. Pluchea camphorata is native to the lower forty-eight states in the United States. Habitats include, alluvial swamps, seasonally flooded sloughs, floodplain oxbow ponds, wet clay flat-woods and clearings, ditches, and impoundment shores.

== Ecology ==
Pluchea camphorata plant blooms from August to October. Pluchea camphorata is listed as endangered in Maryland and Ohio. This plant is threatened by dredging and filling, water pollution, and exotic species.

== Uses ==
Traditional medicinal use of Pluchea camphorata includes applying the leaves to wounds to reduce swelling and facilitate healing. Certain cultures believe that Camphorweed stimulates tissue by moving blood to the surface. While culturally important, these claims require more research for safe use.
