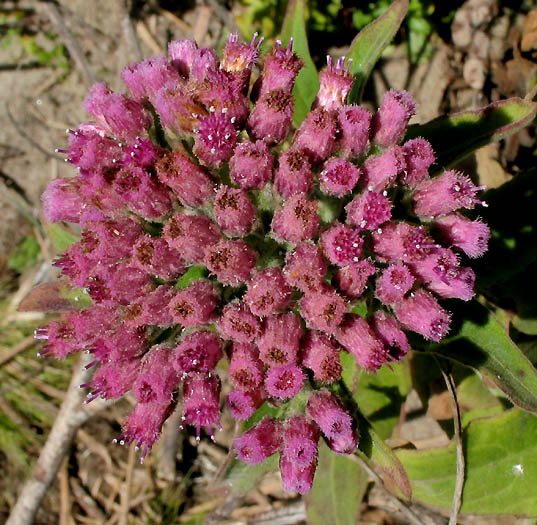

Scientific classification
- Kingdom: Plantae
- Clade: Tracheophytes
- Clade: Angiosperms
- Clade: Eudicots
- Clade: Asterids
- Order: Asterales
- Family: Asteraceae
- Genus: Pluchea
- Species: P. odorata

Binomial name
- Pluchea odorata (L.) Cass.

= Pluchea odorata =

Species of plant

Pluchea odorata is a species of flowering plant in the family Asteraceae. Common names include sweetscent, saltmarsh fleabane and shrubby camphorweed.

== Distribution ==
Native to the United States, Mexico, Central America, the Caribbean, and northern South America, it inhabits wetlands and other coastal habitats and moist inland areas, often in saline substrates. It is an introduced species and a noxious weed in Hawaii and New Caledonia.

== Description ==
Pluchea odorata is an annual or perennial herb growing erect to a maximum height over one meter. It is glandular, coated in rough trichomes (hairs), and strongly aromatic. The toothed oval leaves are up to 12 cm (4.7 in) long and alternately arranged on the stiff stems.

The inflorescence is a large cluster of many flower heads. Each head is less than 1 cm (0.39 in) long and filled with bright pinkish-purple or magenta flowers.

The fruit is a tiny achene tipped with a bristly pappus.

== Uses ==
In some parts of the Caribbean, saltmarsh fleabane is a widely consumed medicinal herbal tea. The hot tea made from the leaves is a stimulant. It stimulates perspiration, in the manner of pleurisy root or pennyroyal, and is diuretic. It is a safe and reliable menstrual stimulant when flow begins late, is scanty, and there are clotty cramps. Moreover, it is antispasmodic, thus relieving cramping. It similarly inhibits spasms and cramps from diarrhea and stomach ache. Used as an eyewash it reduces redness and pain from hay fever, wind and dust. Tea concentrate has been marketed as a coffee substitute. Unlike coffee which is a vasoconstrictor, sweetscent tea is a vasodilator. It is contraindicated for people who get migraines, during pregnancy, and should be used in moderation.

== Gallery ==
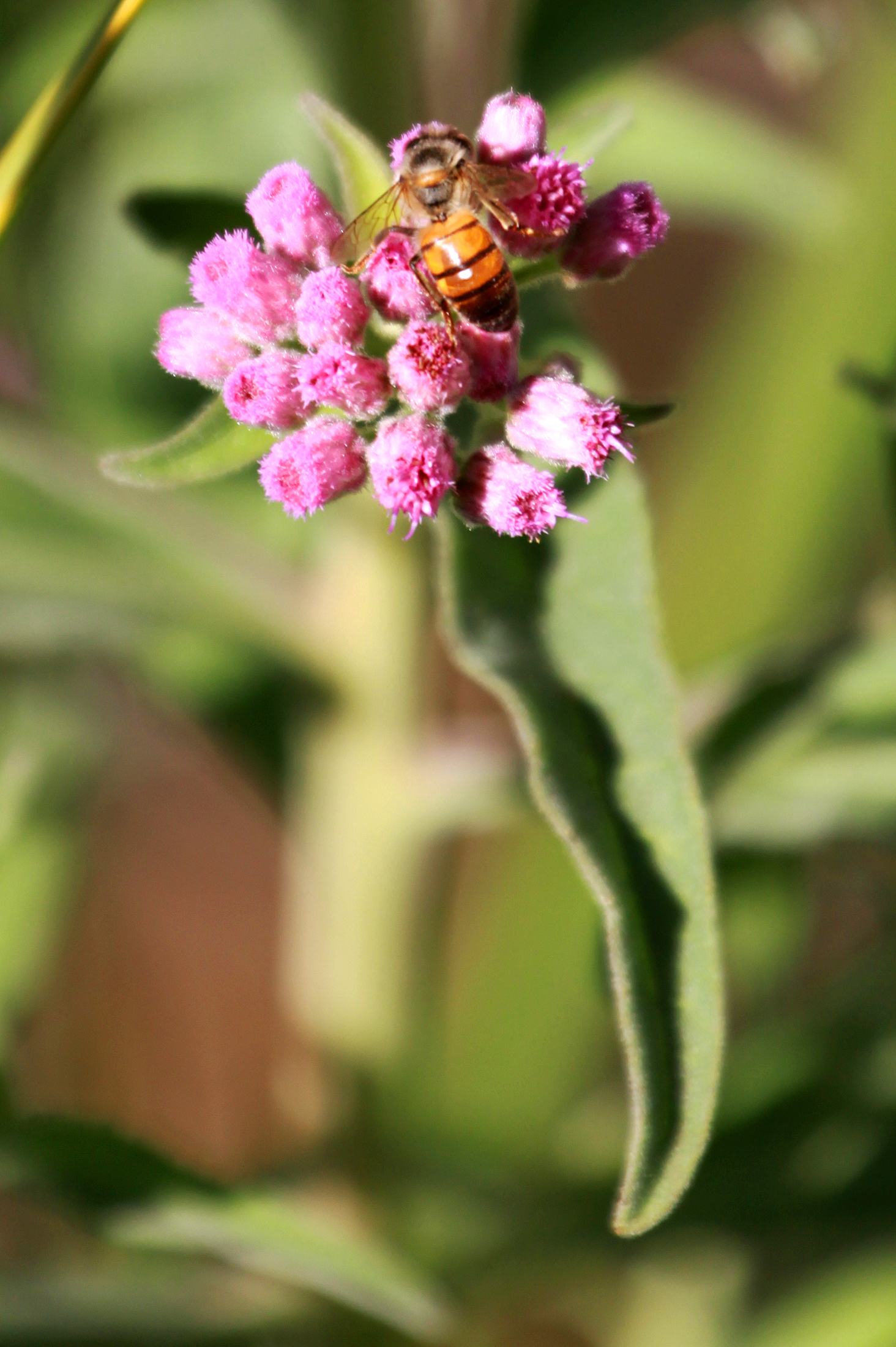
sweetscent

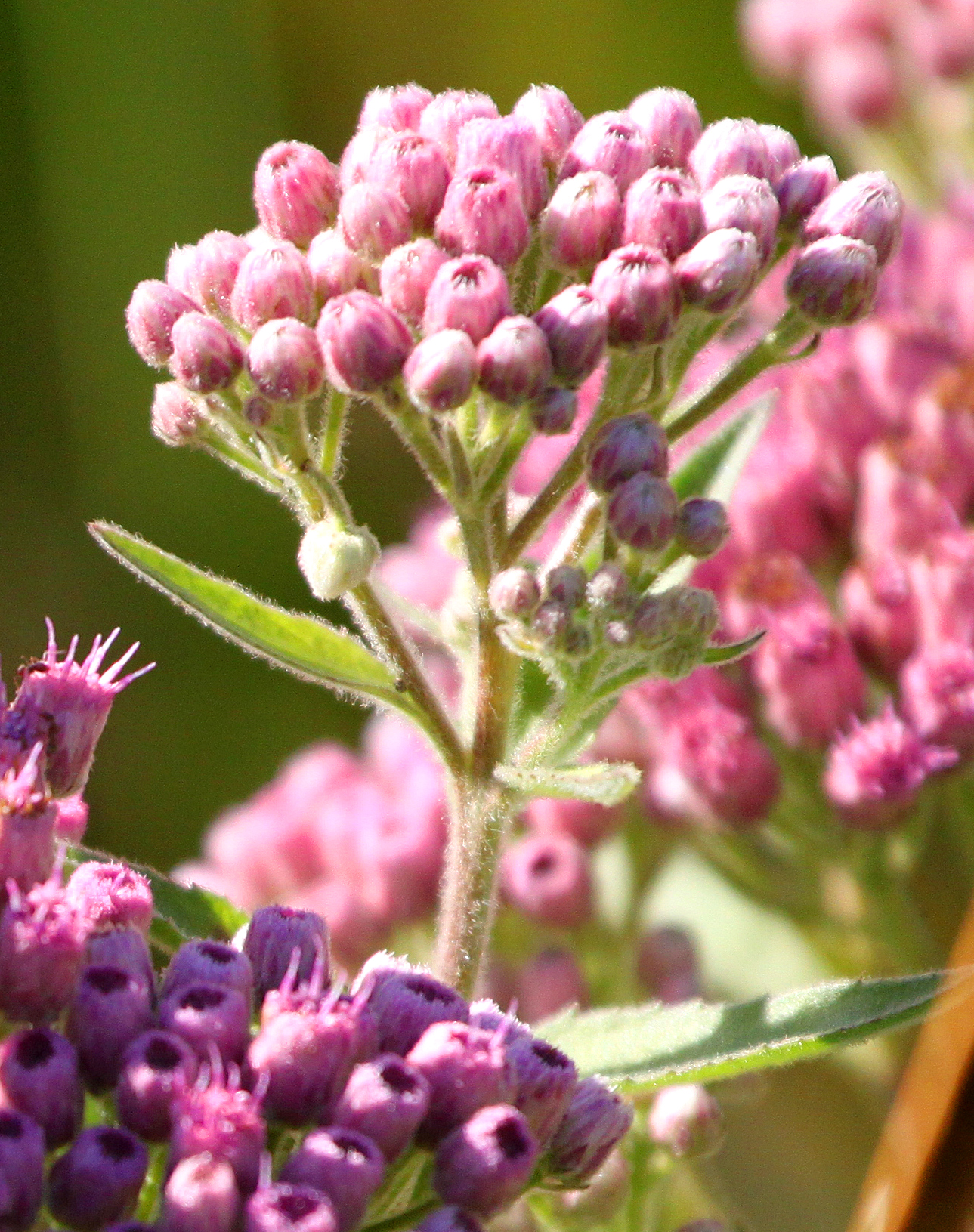
sweetscent

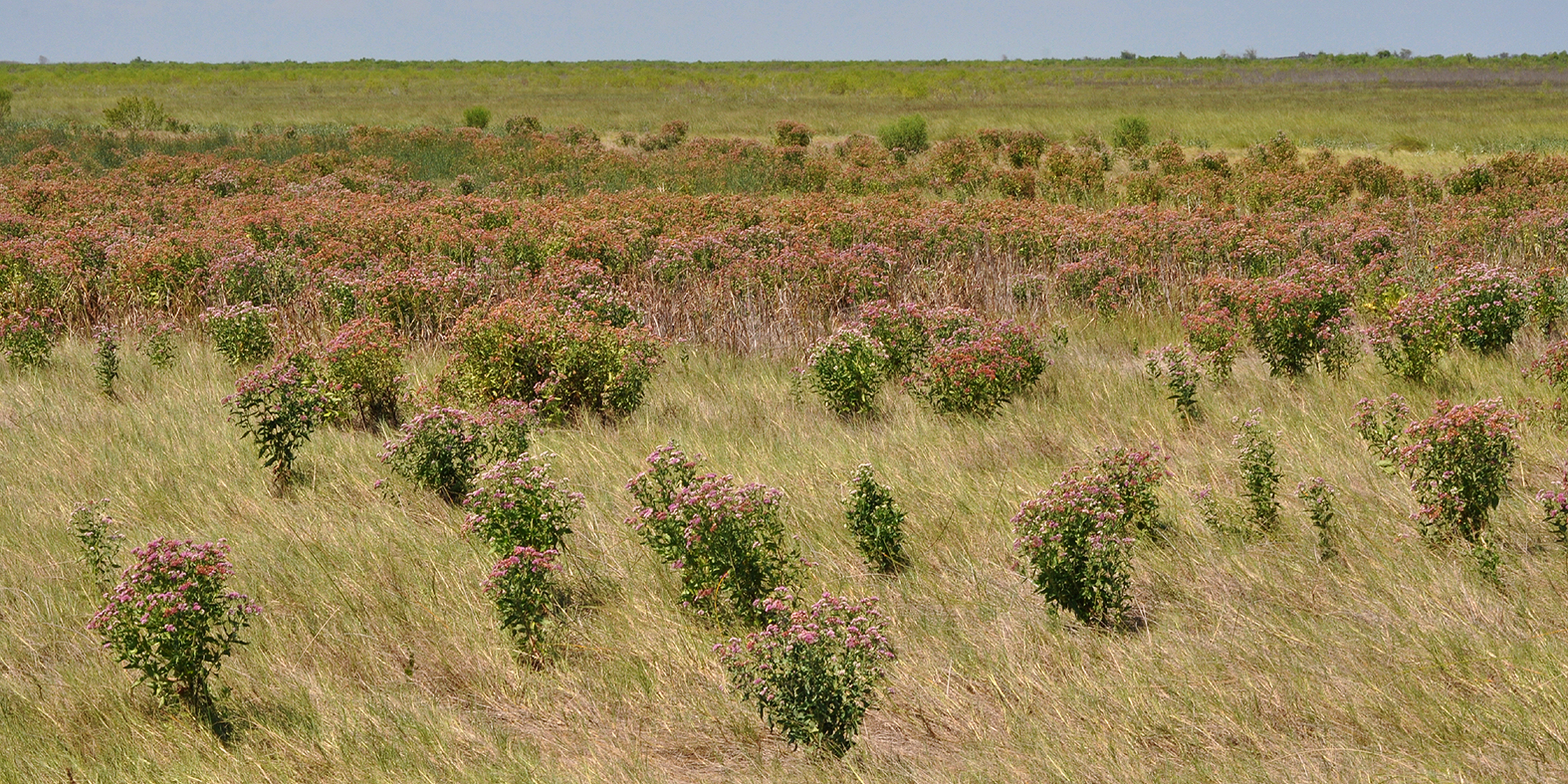
Saltmarsh fleabane (Pluchea odorata), Brazoria National Wildlife Refuge, Brazoria County, Texas, USA (24 August 2013)
