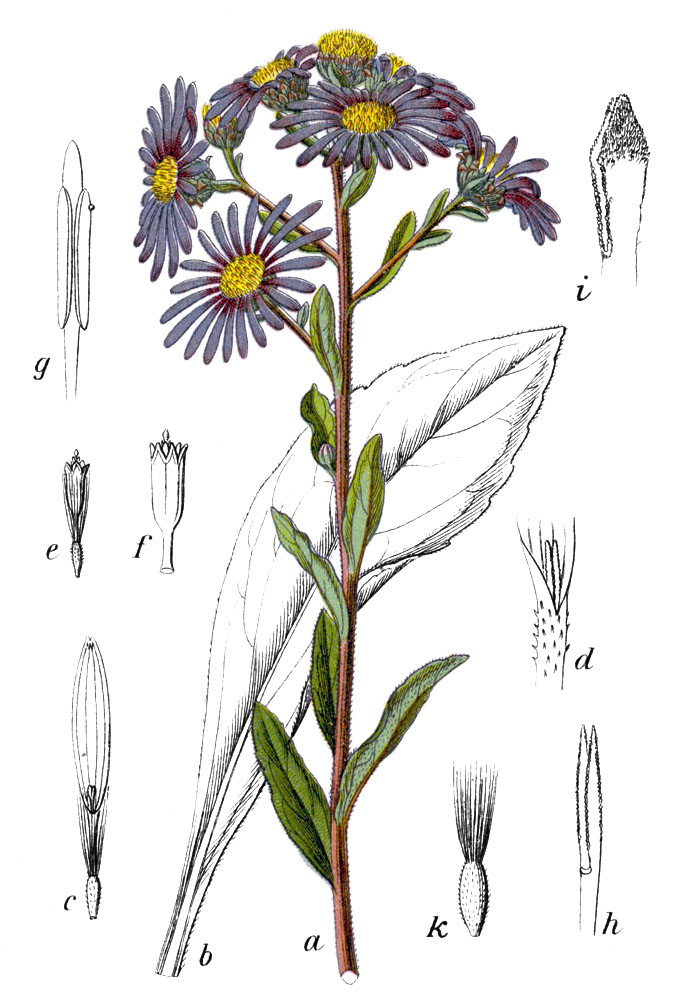
- Illustration of Aster amellus from tribe Astereae

Scientific classification
- Kingdom: Plantae
- Clade: Tracheophytes
- Clade: Angiosperms
- Clade: Eudicots
- Clade: Asterids
- Order: Asterales
- Family: Asteraceae
- Subfamily: Asteroideae; Lindl.

Tribes
- Anthemideae; Astereae; Athroismeae; Bahieae; Calenduleae; Chaenactideae; Coreopsideae; Doroniceae; Eupatorieae; Feddeeae; Gnaphalieae; Helenieae; Heliantheae; Inuleae; Madieae; Millerieae; Neurolaeneae; Perityleae; Plucheeae; Polymnieae; Senecioneae; Tageteae

= Asteroideae =

Subfamily of flowering plants

Asteroideae is a subfamily of the plant family Asteraceae. It contains about 70% of the species of the family. It consists of several tribes, including Astereae, Calenduleae, Eupatorieae, Gnaphalieae, Heliantheae, Senecioneae and Tageteae. Asteroideae contains plants found all over the world, many of which are shrubby. There are about 1,135 genera and 17,200 species within this subfamily; the largest genera by number of species are Helichrysum (500–600) and Artemisia (550).

Asteroideae is said to date back to approximately 46–36.5 million years ago.

== Common characteristics ==
This family will often have radiate style heads but some could have discoid or disciform. They contain ray florets that are three lobed and are also considered perfect flower implying that it is bisexual. Many contain stigmatic surfaces that are separated by two marginal bands and terminal sterile appendages with sweeping hairs.

== Taxonomy ==
The subfamily is composed of 21 tribes. From 2004 they were grouped into three supertribes: Senecionodae, Asterodae, and Helianthodae. A phylogenetic study published in 2019 found that Asterodae was polyphyletic, and in 2024 Feng et al. placed tribes Anthemideae and Calenduleae in the supertribes Anthemidodae and Calendulodae, respectively.

The five supertribes and 21 tribes are listed below. Tribe Senecioneae contains about 120 genera and more than 3,200 species that are found in more temperate areas. Asterodae contains many economically important plants such as the common daisy and the asters. Supertribe Helianthodae, which is the largest of the three, containing 15 of the 21 tribes.

- Anthemodae
  - Anthemideae (including chrysanthemums)
- Asterodae
  - Astereae (including asters and the common daisy)
  - Gnaphalieae
- Calendulodae
  - Calenduleae (including calendulas)
- Helianthodae (Ambrosiodae per Feng et al.)
  - Athroismeae
  - Bahieae
  - Chaenactideae
  - Coreopsideae (including cosmos and dahlias)
  - Eupatorieae
  - Feddeeae
  - Helenieae (including gaillardias)
  - Heliantheae (Ambrosieae per Feng et al.; including sunflowers and zinnias)
  - Inuleae (including Plucheeae)
  - Madieae
  - Millerieae
  - Neurolaeneae
  - Perityleae
  - Polymnieae
  - Tageteae (including marigolds)
- Senecionodae
  - Senecioneae (Doronicum is sometimes placed in a separate tribe Doroniceae)

== Phylogenetic Tree ==
Asteroideae while being a subfamily to the plant family Asteraceae has a very complicated phylogenetic tree with many scientists believing that it is similarly related to different plant families. While there still needs to be more research done to truly identify a phylogenetic tree the most recent discovery pointer to the closest common ancestor is the tribe Anthemideae.

== Uses ==
The subfamily Asteroideae has many genera within the tribes that have economic uses. Helianthus tuberosus (Jerusalem artichoke), Helianthus annuus (sunflower) and Guizotia abyssinica (niger seed) are all used as oil seed crops. Artemisia dracunculus (tarragon) is used as a culinary herb and Parthenium argentatum (guayule) is a rubber source. Some of the other genera are used as ornamentals; those are Dendranthema spp. (chrysanthemum), Callistephus, Cosmos, Tagetes (marigold), and many others. Asteroideae is also a good source of food for land mammals such as rabbits, deer, racoons, chipmunks, squirrels, and other grazing animals.
