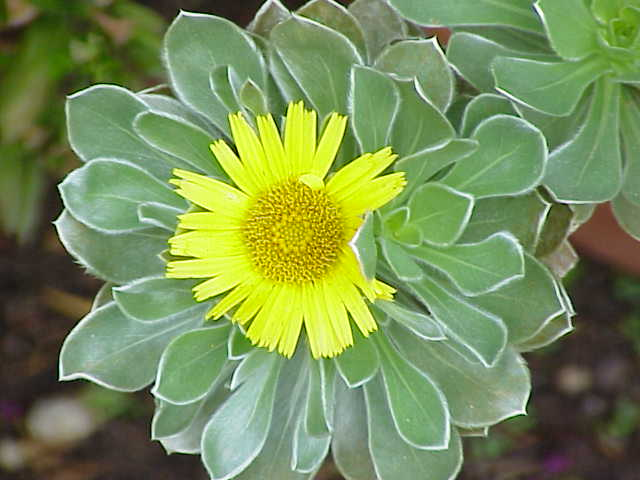
- Asteriscus sericeus

Scientific classification
- Kingdom: Plantae
- Clade: Tracheophytes
- Clade: Angiosperms
- Clade: Eudicots
- Clade: Asterids
- Order: Asterales
- Family: Asteraceae
- Subfamily: Asteroideae
- Tribe: Inuleae
- Genus: Asteriscus; Tourn. ex Mill.

Synonyms
- Dontospermum Sch.Bip.; Bubonium Hill; Odontospermum Neck. ex Sch.Bip.; Nauplius (Cass.) Cass.

= Asteriscus (plant) =

Genus of flowering plants

Asteriscus is a genus of flowering plants in the family Asteraceae.

== Species ==
As of August 2020 there are nine accepted species in Asteriscus:
No.	Binomial name	Authority	Distribution	Images
1.	Asteriscus aquaticus	(L.) Less.	North Africa, Mediterranean Region, Middle East, Europe, Balearic Islands, Canary Island, Turkey	Asteriscus aquaticus
2.	Asteriscus daltonii	Walp.	Cape Verde (Santiago)	Asteriscus daltonii subspecies volgelii
3.	Asteriscus graveolens	(Forssk.) Less.	North Africa, Middle East	Asteriscus graveolens
4.	Asteriscus imbricatus	DC.	Morocco	
5.	Asteriscus intermedius	(DC.) Pit. & Proust	Canary Islands	Asteriscus intermedius
6.	Asteriscus pinifolius	Maire & Wilczek	Morocco	
7.	Asteriscus schultzii	(Bolle) Pit. & Proust	Canary Island, Morocco and Western Sahara	Asteriscus schultzii
8.	Asteriscus sericeus	(L.f.) DC.	Canary Islands and introduced in Morocco	Asteriscus sericus
9.	Asteriscus smithii	Walp.	Cape Verde (São Nicolau)	

Species formerly included

Several species have been transferred to Pallenis or Rhanterium, most notably:

- Asteriscus maritimus (L.) Less., synonym of Pallenis maritima (L.) Greuter

== Distribution ==
The genus is native to Europe, North Africa, Macaronesia, and the Middle East.

== Bibliography ==
1. Candolle, Augustin Pyramus de (1836). Prodromus systematis naturalis regni vegetabilis, sive, Enumeratio contracta ordinum generum specierumque plantarum huc usque cognitarium, juxta methodi naturalis, normas digesta (in Latin). Vol. 5. Parisii: Sumptibus Sociorum Treuttel et Würtz.
2. K Ueda (2020). "iNaturalist Research-grade Observations". iNaturalist.org. doi:10.15468/ab3s5x.
3. Lessing, Christian Friedrich (1832). Synopsis generum compositarum earumque dispositionis novae tentamen, monographis multarum Capensium interjectis. Berolini: sumtibus Dunckeri et Humblotii.
4. Maire, René Charles Joseph Ernest; Wilczek (1935). Bulletin de la Société d'Histoire Naturelle de l'Afrique du Nord. Vol. 26.
5. Pitard, Charles-Joseph Marie; Proust, Louis (1909). Iles Canaries.
6. POWO (2019). "Plants of the World Online". Published on the Internet. Archived from the original on March 22, 2017.
7. Walpers, Wilhelm Gerhard (1852). Annales botanices systematicae. Vol. 5 (2 ed.). Lipsiae: Sumtibus F. Hofmeiste.
