= Asteriscus =

Asteriscus may refer to:

- Asteriscus (plant), a genus of flowering plants
- Asteriscus, a component of the otolith, a structure in the inner ear
