= A. maritimus =

A. maritimus may refer to:

- Ammodramus maritimus, a bird species
- Anguliphantes maritimus, a spider species
- Anotylus maritimus, a rove beetle species
- Asteriscus maritimus, a plant species
- Augyles maritimus, a mud-loving beetle species

== See also ==
- Maritimus (disambiguation)
