= Wildlife of Kuwait =

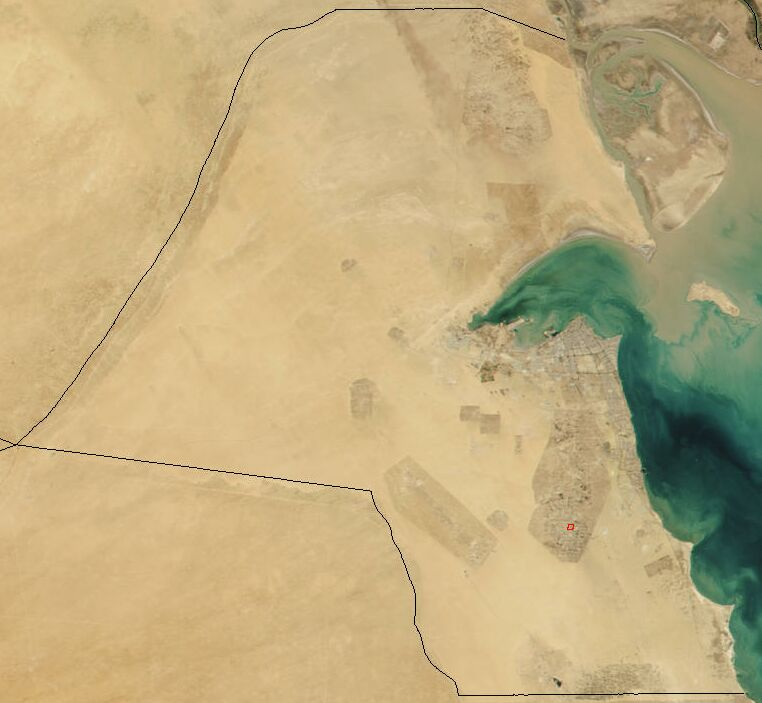
Satellite image of Kuwait revealing its desert topography

The wildlife of Kuwait consists of the flora and fauna of Kuwait and their natural habitats. Kuwait is a country in West Asia at the head of the Persian Gulf, located between Iraq and Saudi Arabia.

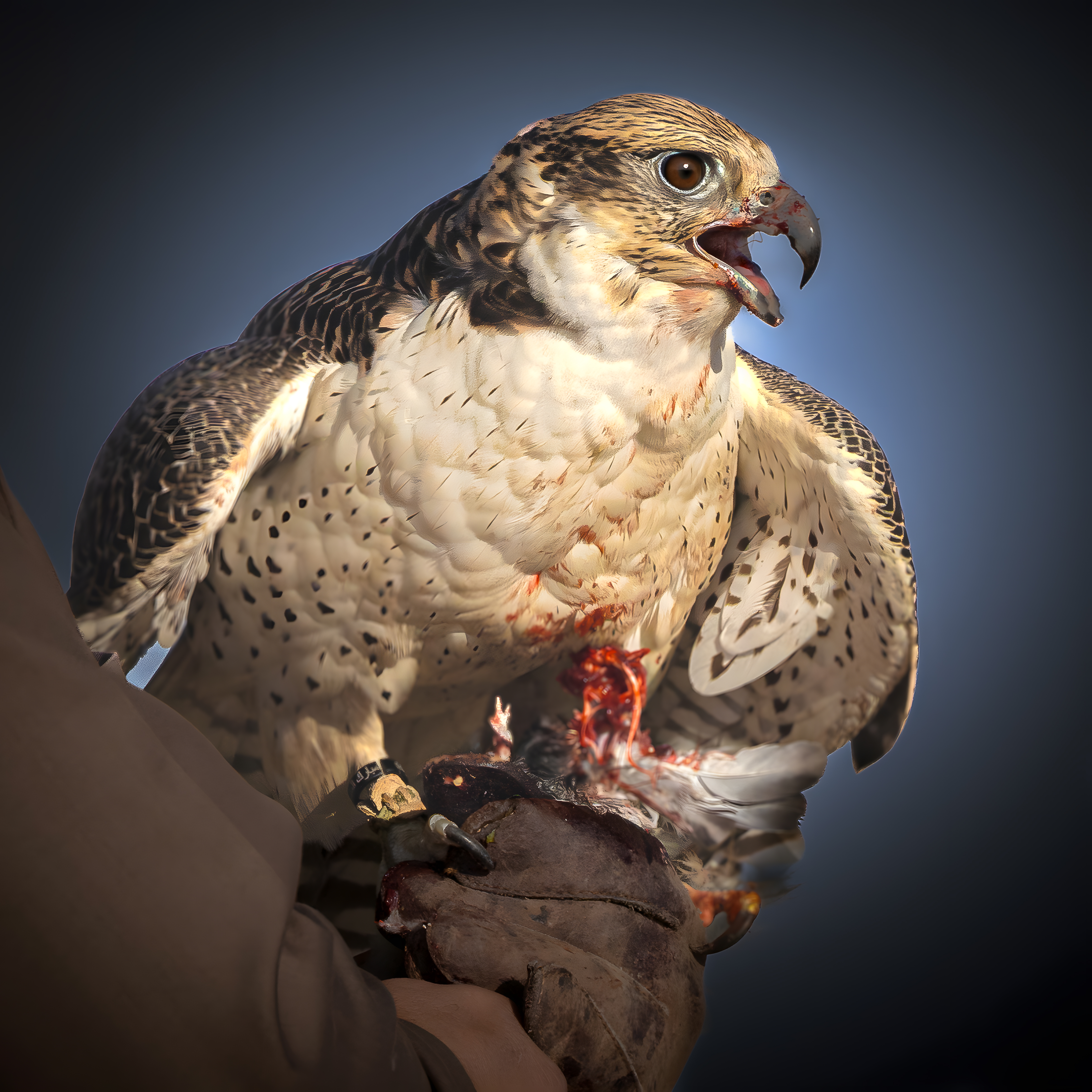
The falcon is the national bird of Kuwait.

== Geography ==
Kuwait spans 17,820 km^{2} (6,880 mi^{2}), stretching about 200 km (124 mi) from north to south and 170 km (106 mi) from east to west. It boasts a coastline of 195 km (121 mi) along the Persian Gulf and includes nine islands, the largest being Bubiyan Island. The main geographical feature is Kuwait Bay, which provides a natural harbor where Kuwait City is located. The country consists largely of undulating flat land with low hills. The country is divided into four zones; a desert plateau to the west; salt marshes, mud flats and saline depressions around Kuwait Bay; sand dunes to the east; and a desert plain occupying the bulk of the country.

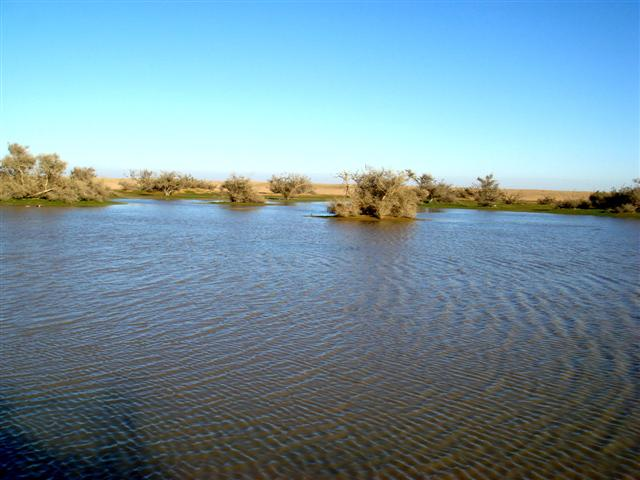
Wadi al-Batin flowing through the borders of Kuwait and Iraq

== Climate ==
Kuwait has an arid climate. The summer is hot and dry and the precipitation, which averages less than 8 cm (3.1 in) falls mainly in the winter in the form of unpredictable showers and as thunderstorms in spring. Dust storms can occur at any time of year but are more common in spring and summer. Average daily temperatures in the summer are around 43 °C (109 °F). In the winter, average temperate are 13 °C (55 °F), and there can be night frosts.

== Flora ==
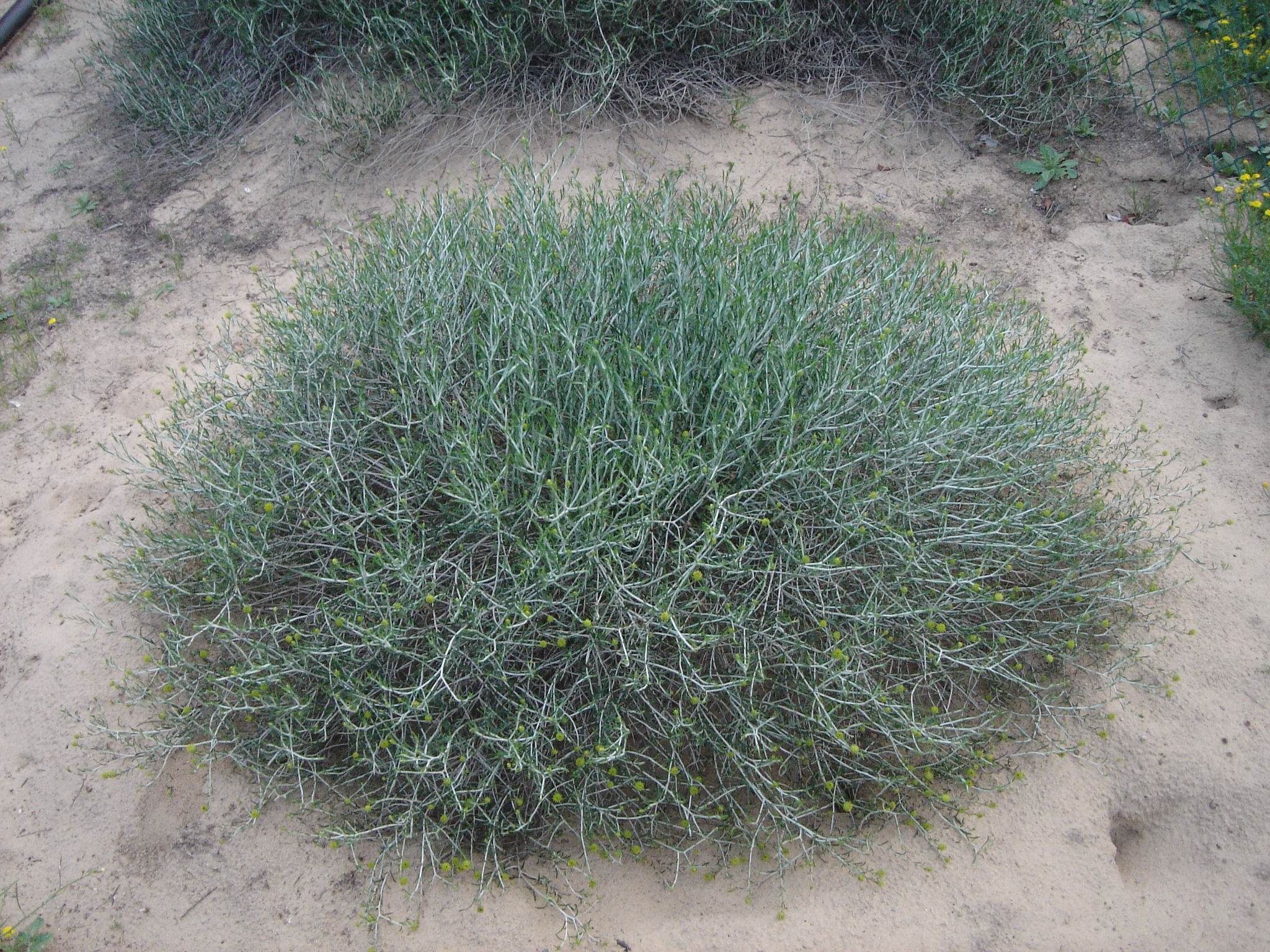
Rhanterium epapposum

Over 400 species of wild plant have been recorded in Kuwait. The arfaj is the national flower of Kuwait. Desert plants are typically coarse grasses and salt-tolerant shrubs which tend to be low growing and often spiny; one of the most common plants is Rhanterium epapposum, known locally as arfaj, which is used for forage by camels and sheep. After rainfall, annual plants spring up from seeds which may have lain dormant for years. The flowers they produce are often blue or purple and as soon as the seed is set, the plants wither and die. About two thirds of the plant species are annuals with smaller numbers of perennial plants, shrubs and sub-shrubs. The native flora is in transition between semi-desert and desert vegetation and is of importance in the study of how humans are impacting semi-desert habitats. The aftermath of the Gulf War and the inundation of much of the land with hydrocarbon residues has caused considerable damage to the soil structure and considerable changes to the environment. Date palms have been planted at oases and near the coast and mangroves and sea grasses grow on the mudflats near Kuwait Bay, their roots helping to stabilize the coastline.

== Fauna ==
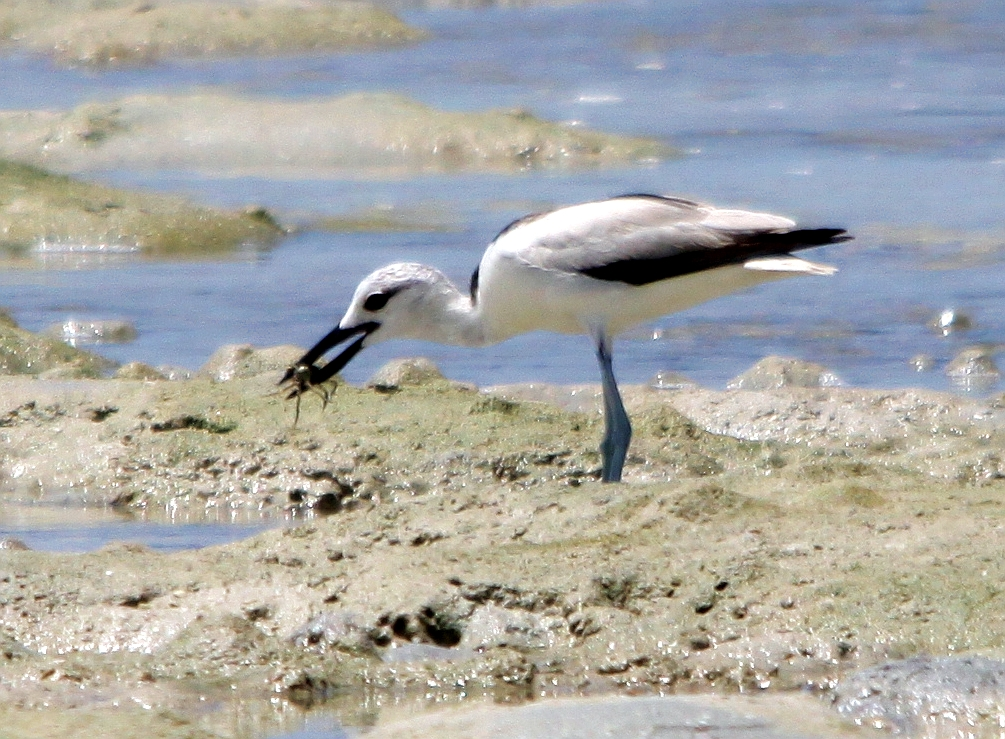
Crab-plover eating a crab

Currently, 442 species of birds have been recorded in Kuwait, 18 species of which breed in the country. Kuwait is situated at the crossroads of several major bird migration routes and between two and three million birds pass each year. The marshes in northern Kuwait and Jahra have become increasingly important as a refuge for passage migrants. Kuwaiti islands are important breeding areas for four species of tern and the Socotra cormorant.

The Mubarak Al-Kabeer Reserve Ramsar site on Boubyan Island consists of lagoons and salt marshes and is visited annually by wetland birds migrating from Eurasia to Africa, and others traveling from Turkey to India. Other birds live and breed on these wetlands all year round, including the world's largest breeding colony of crab-plovers. Among the resident birds, the commonest is the desert lark, and inland the kestrel and short-toed snake eagle hunt in the desert.

Kuwait has only one species of amphibian, the variable toad (Bufotes variabilis), and has about 38 species of reptile. These include the Arabian sand boa, the black desert cobra, the monitor lizard and a number of different spiny-tailed lizards (Uromastyx spp.). Many of these spend the heat of the day in burrows, emerging at night to feed. The frog-eyed gecko (Teratoscincus scincus) does this, burrowing as deep as 1.2 m (4 ft) below the surface among the dunes of the coastal plains, where it remains cool and humid.

Around 28 species of mammals have been recorded in the country. Terrestrial mammals include several small desert rodents, the desert hedgehog, the African wildcat, the sand cat, the caracal, the Indian grey mongoose, the striped hyena, the golden jackal, the fennec fox, the honey badger, the Saudi gazelle, the goitered gazelle, the Arabian oryx, the dromedary and two species of bat. The dugong has been recorded in Kuwaiti waters in the Persian Gulf, as well as the Bryde's whale, the pygmy blue whale, the humpback whale, the finless porpoise, the Indo-Pacific humpbacked dolphin and the Risso's dolphin.

Scorpions and dung beetles abound, and in the wetlands and mudflats around Kuwait Bay and the islands there are crabs and mudskippers, numerous species of fish, waterfowl, gulls, flamingos and dugongs.

== Gallery ==
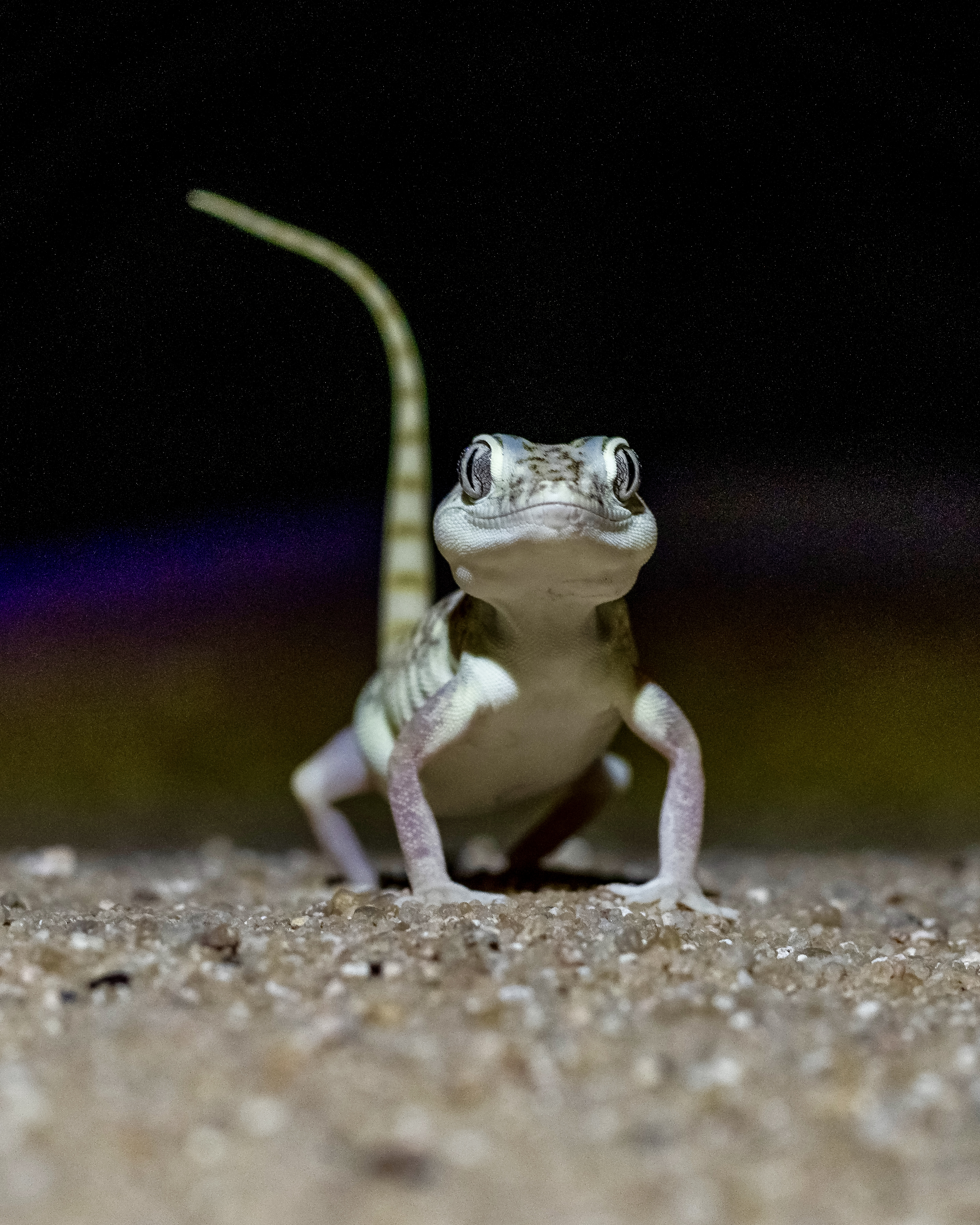

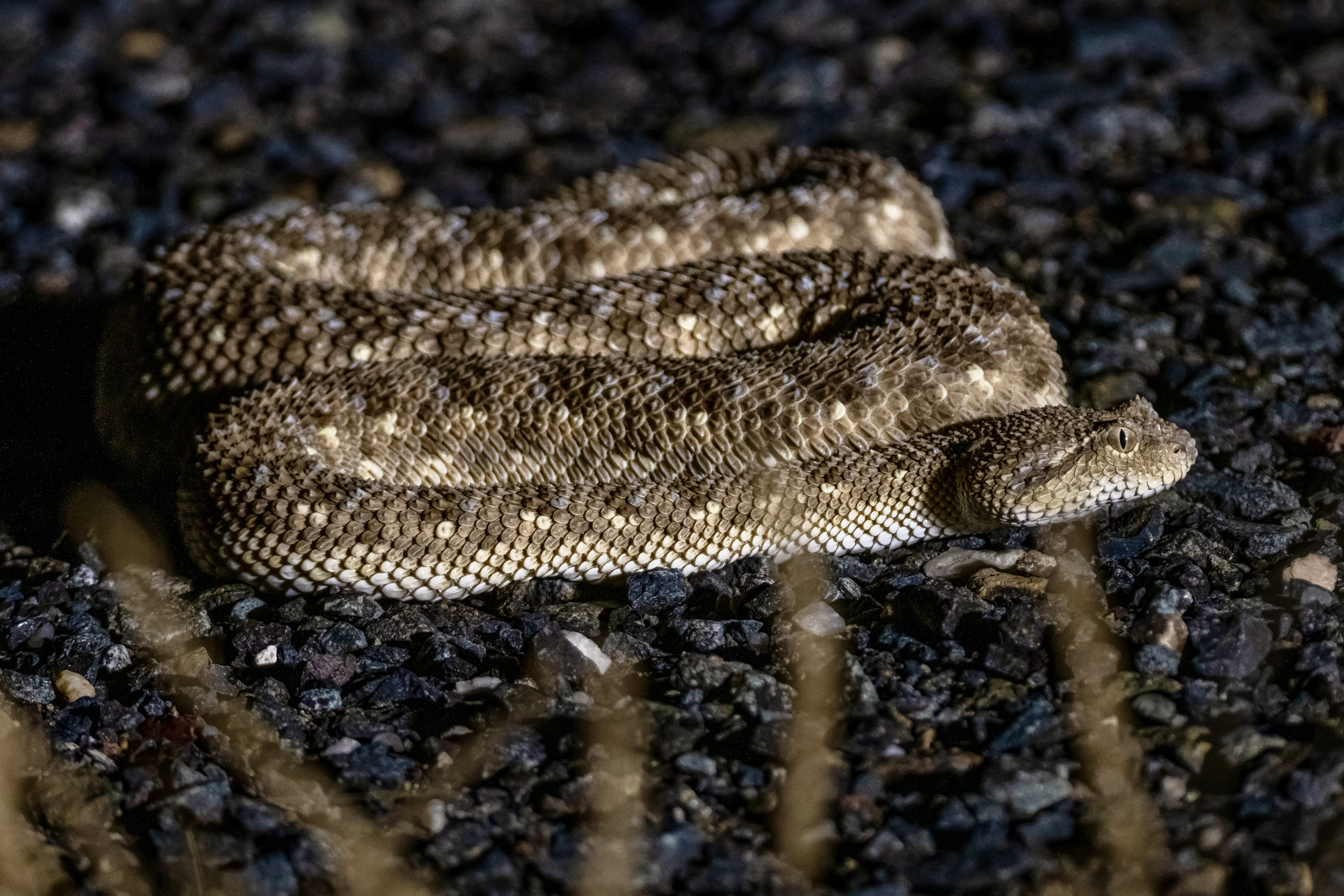

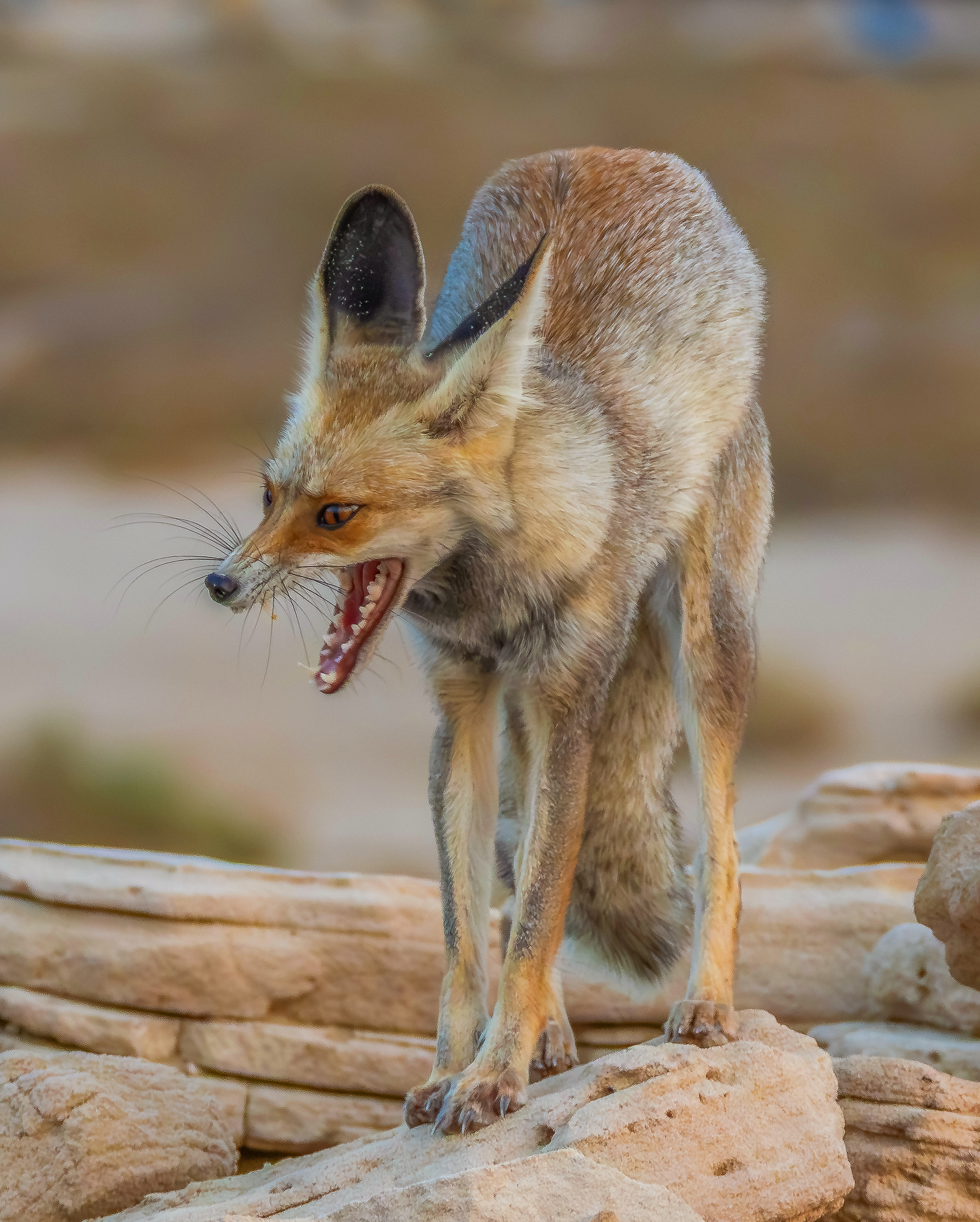

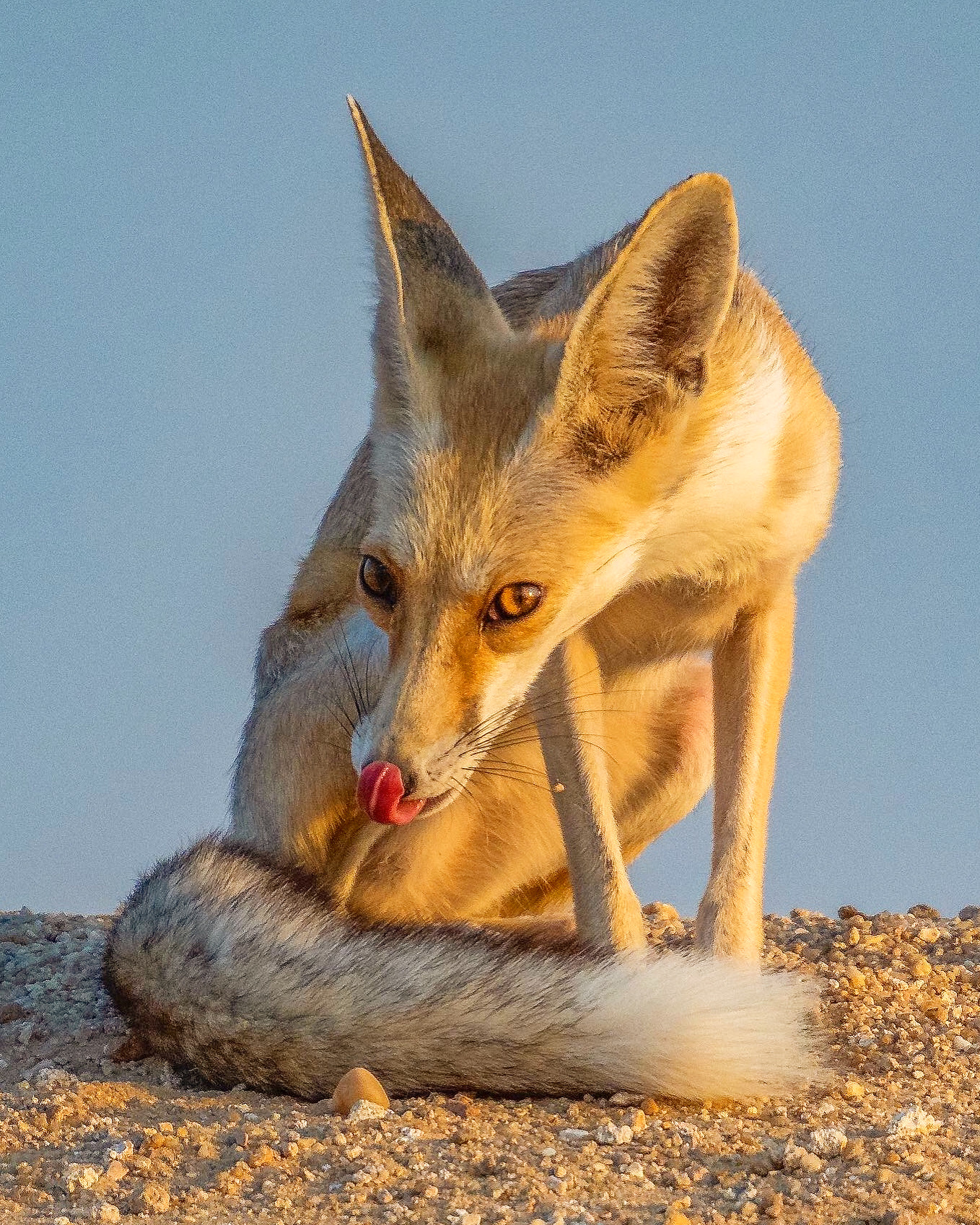

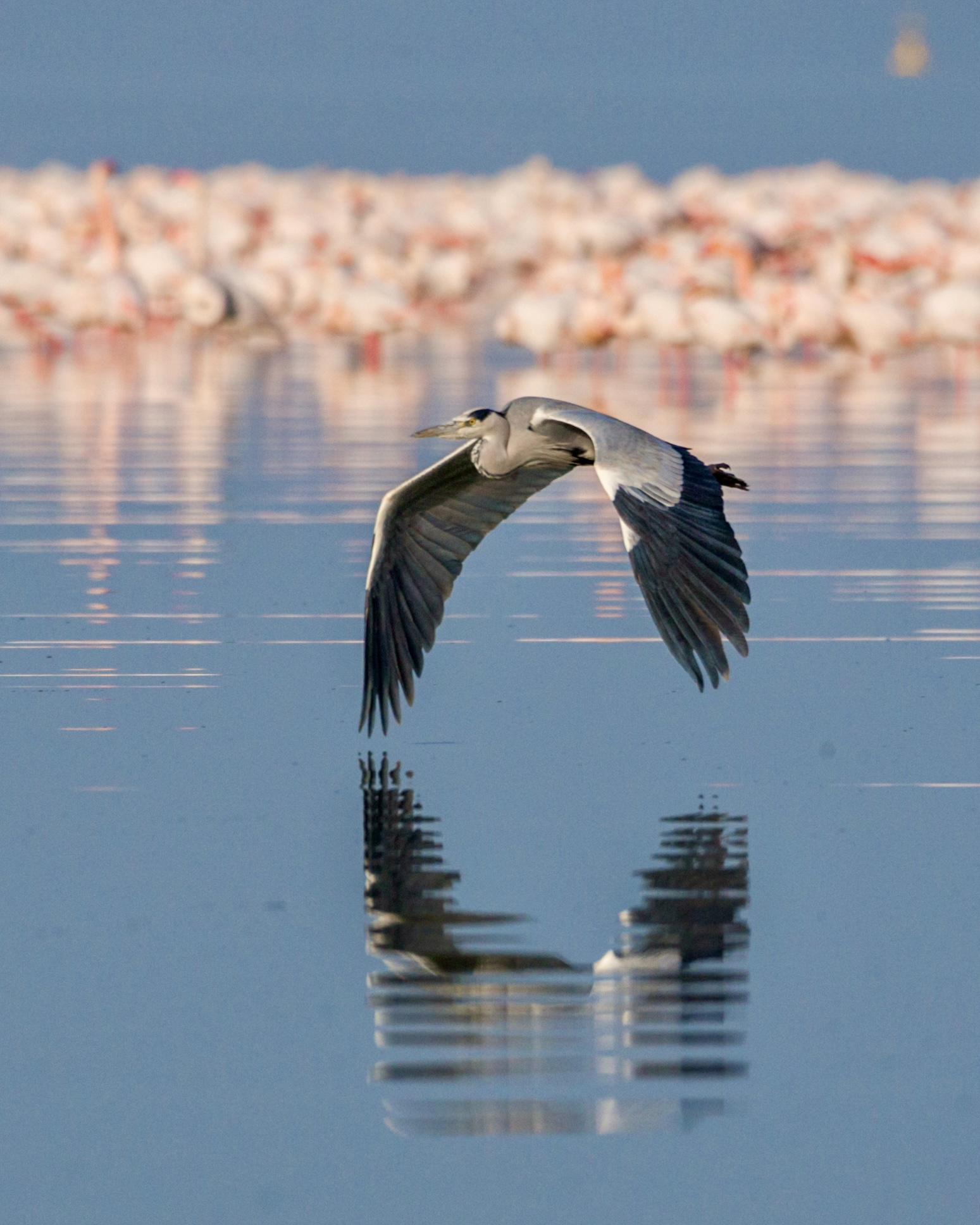

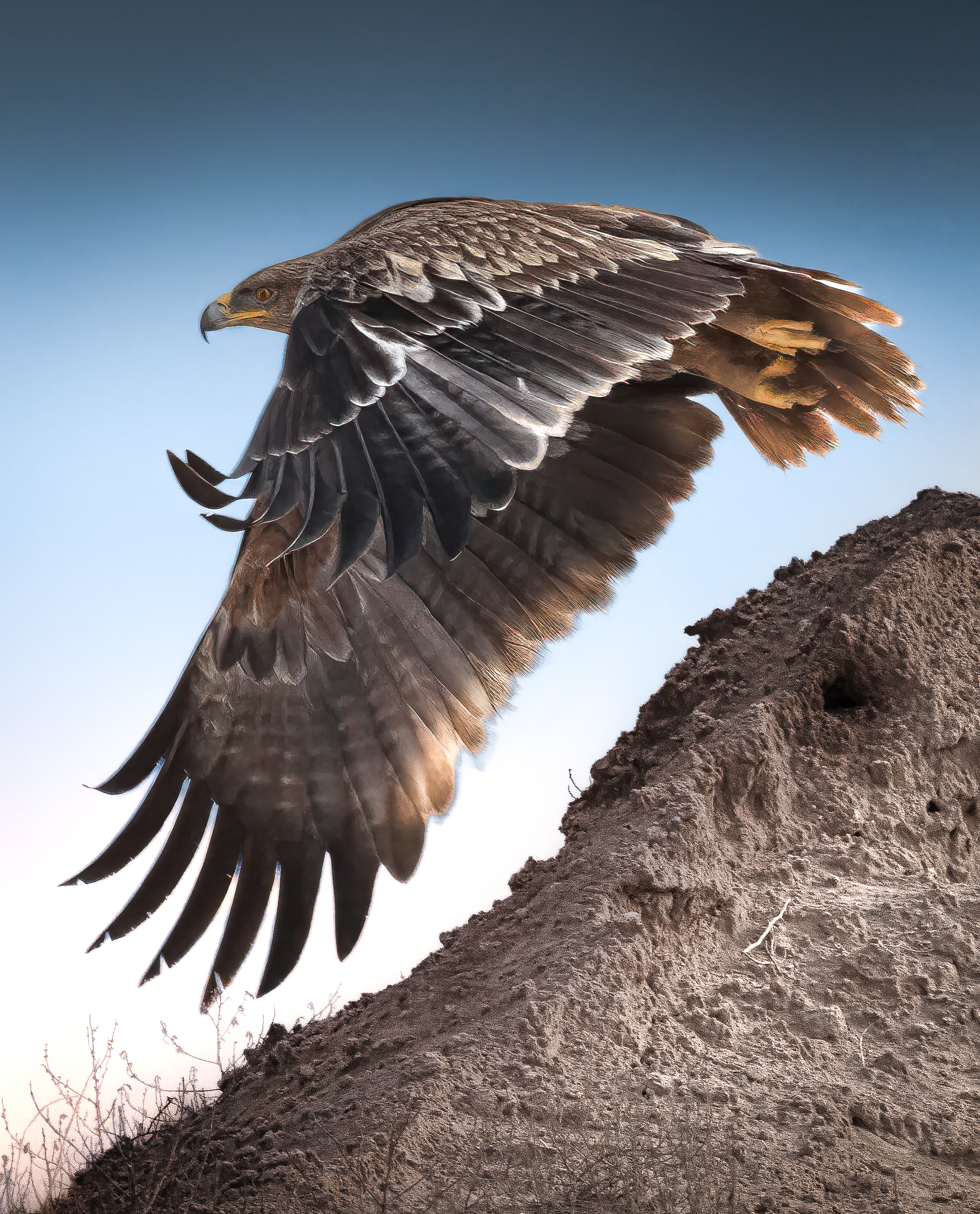
Eagle

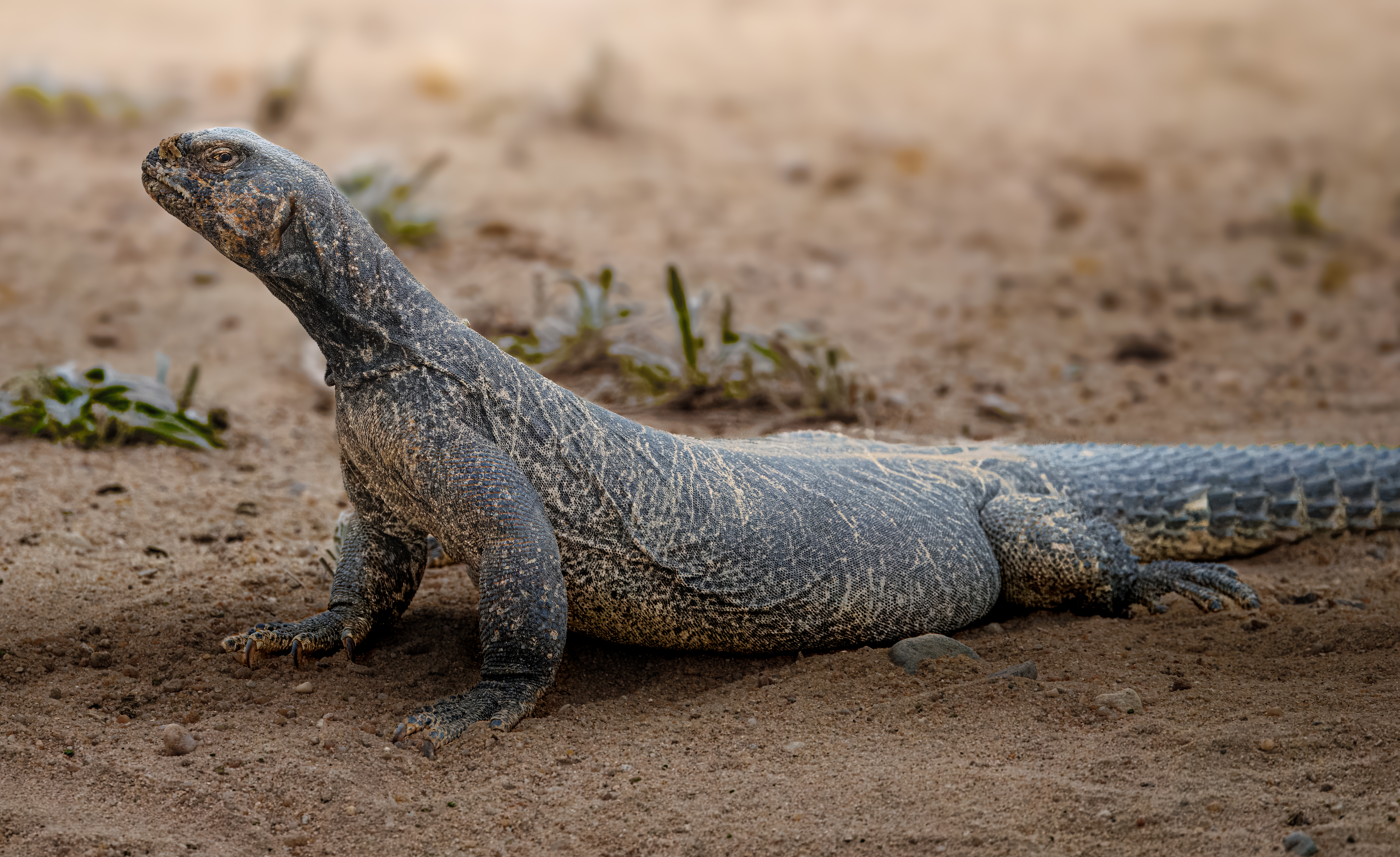
Spiny tailed lizard

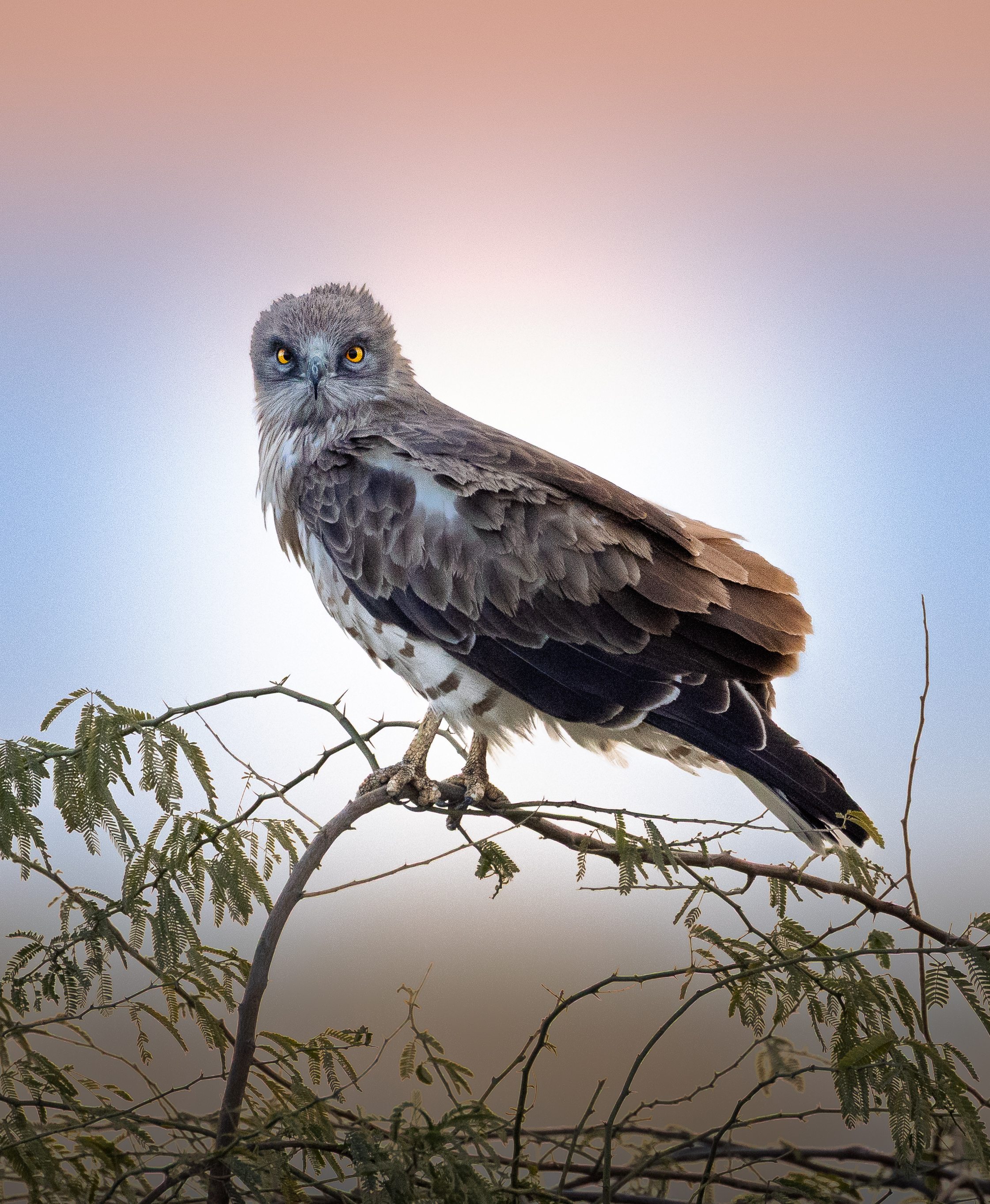
Short-toed snake eagle

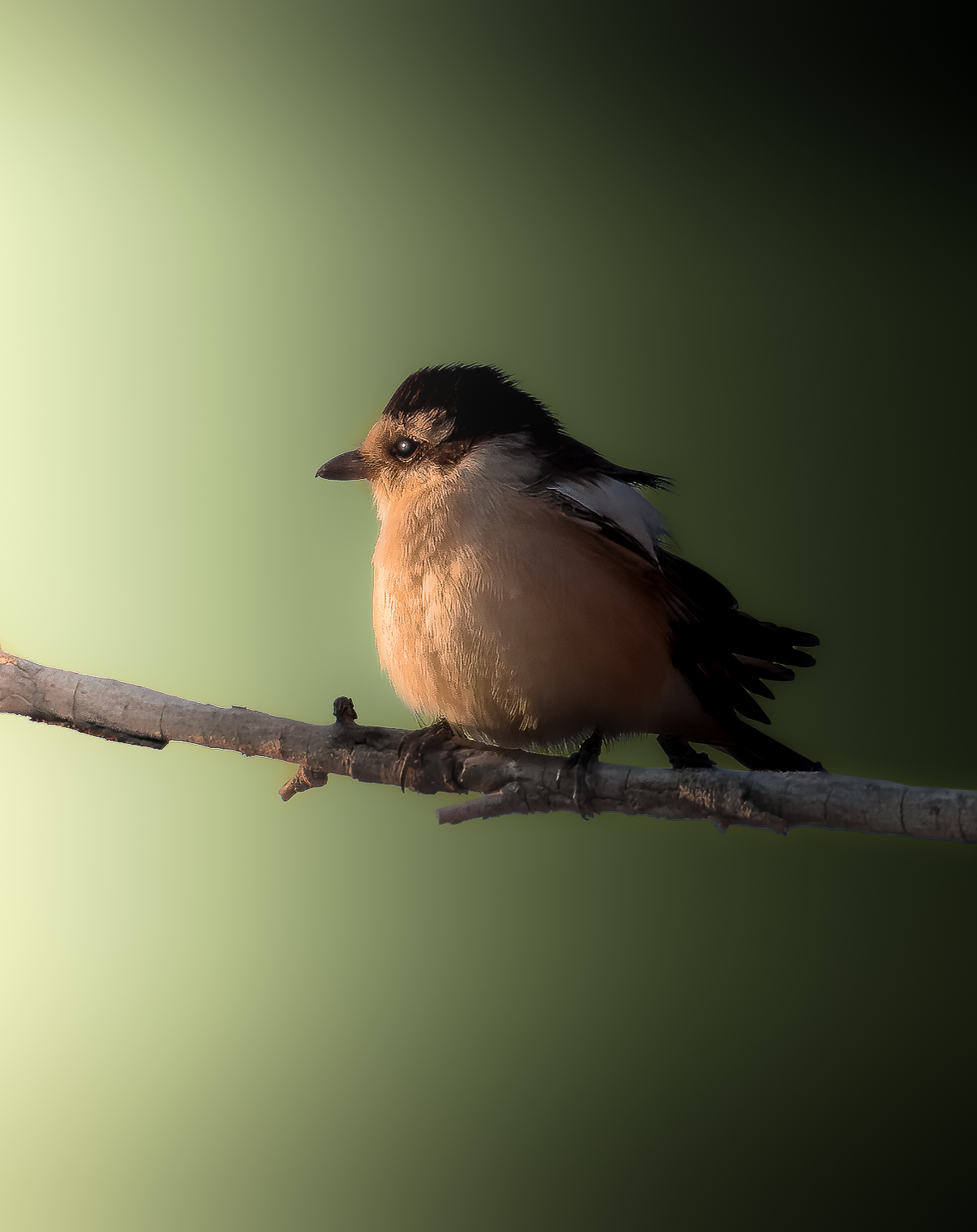
Masked shrike

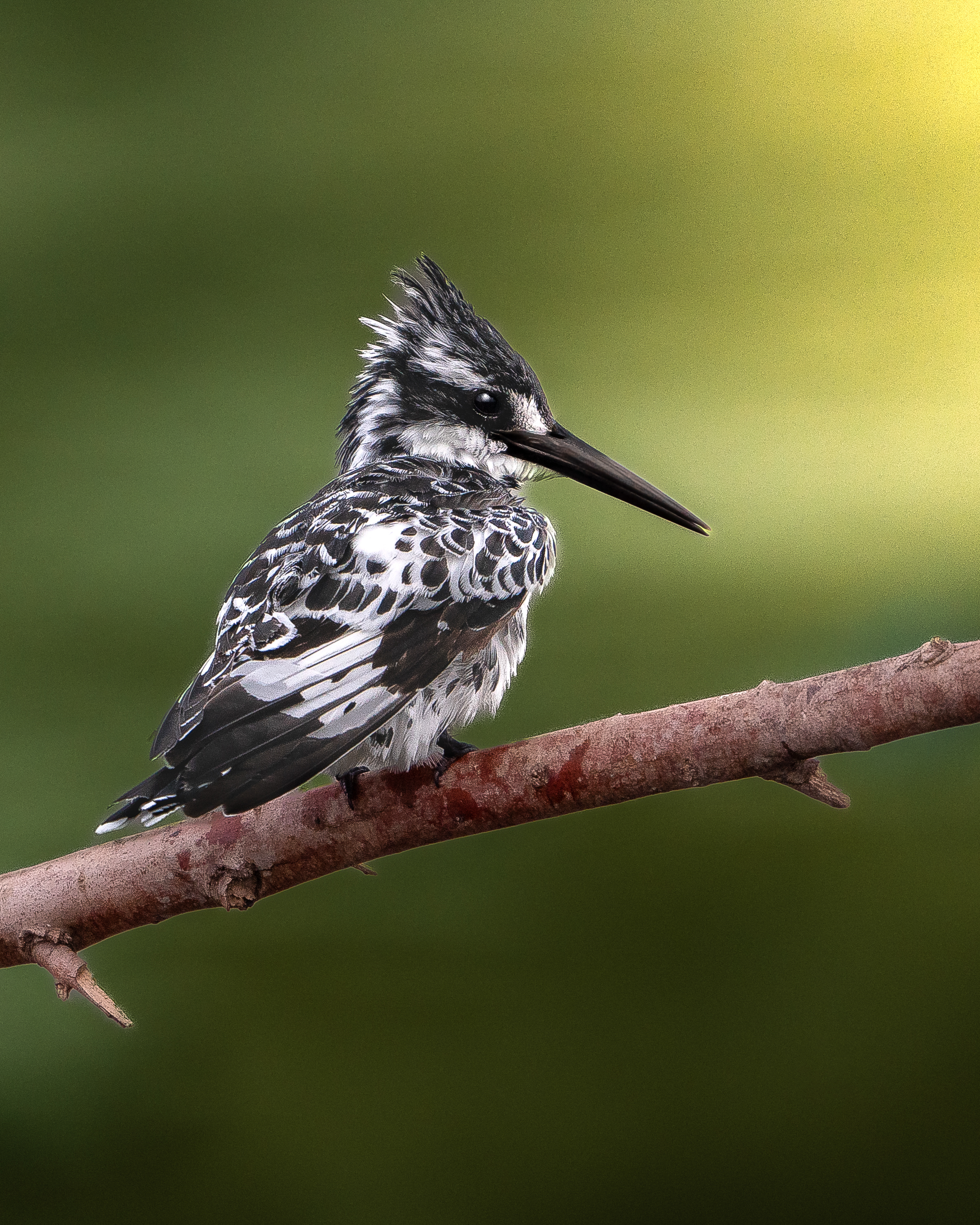
Kingfisher

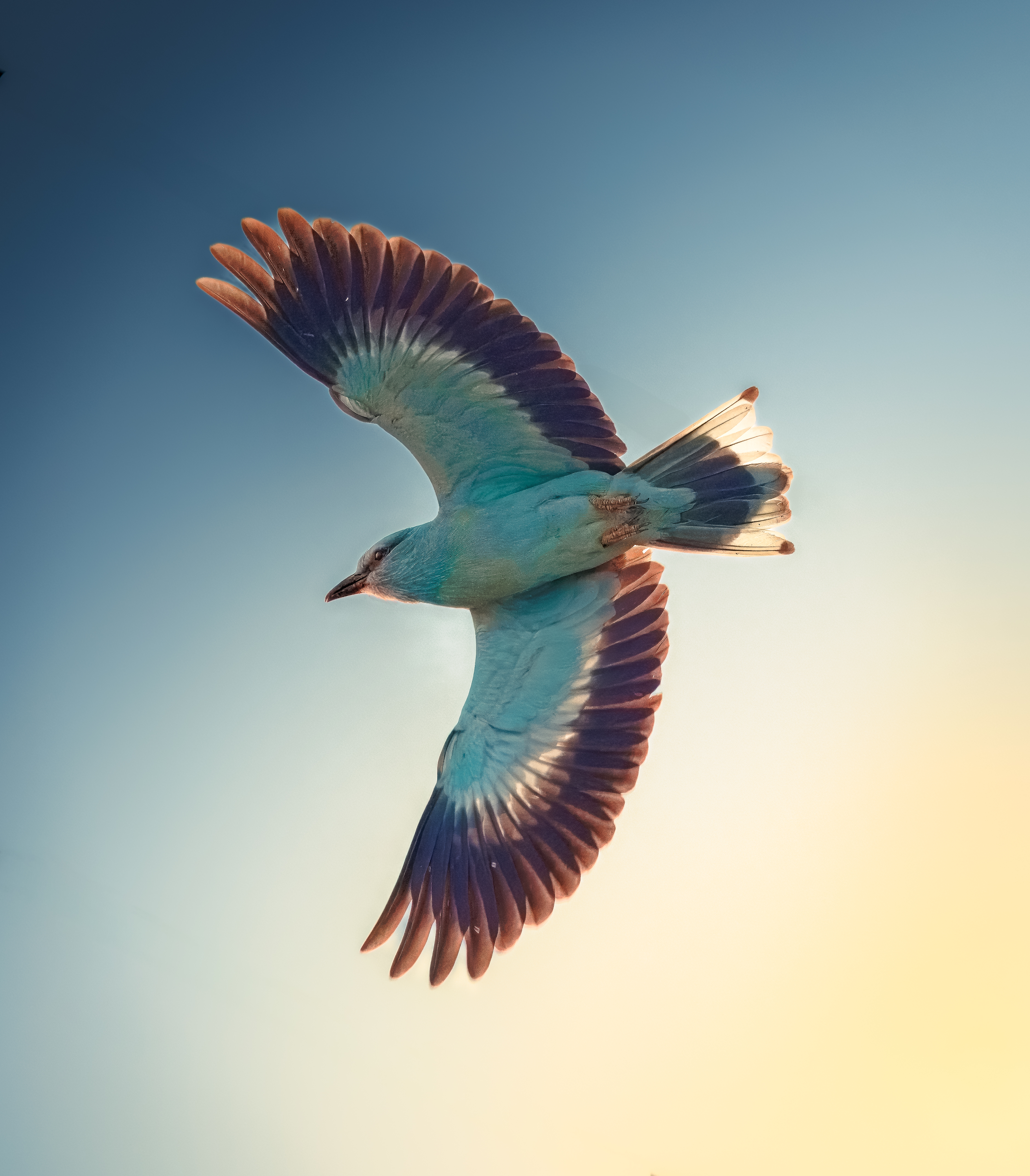
European roller

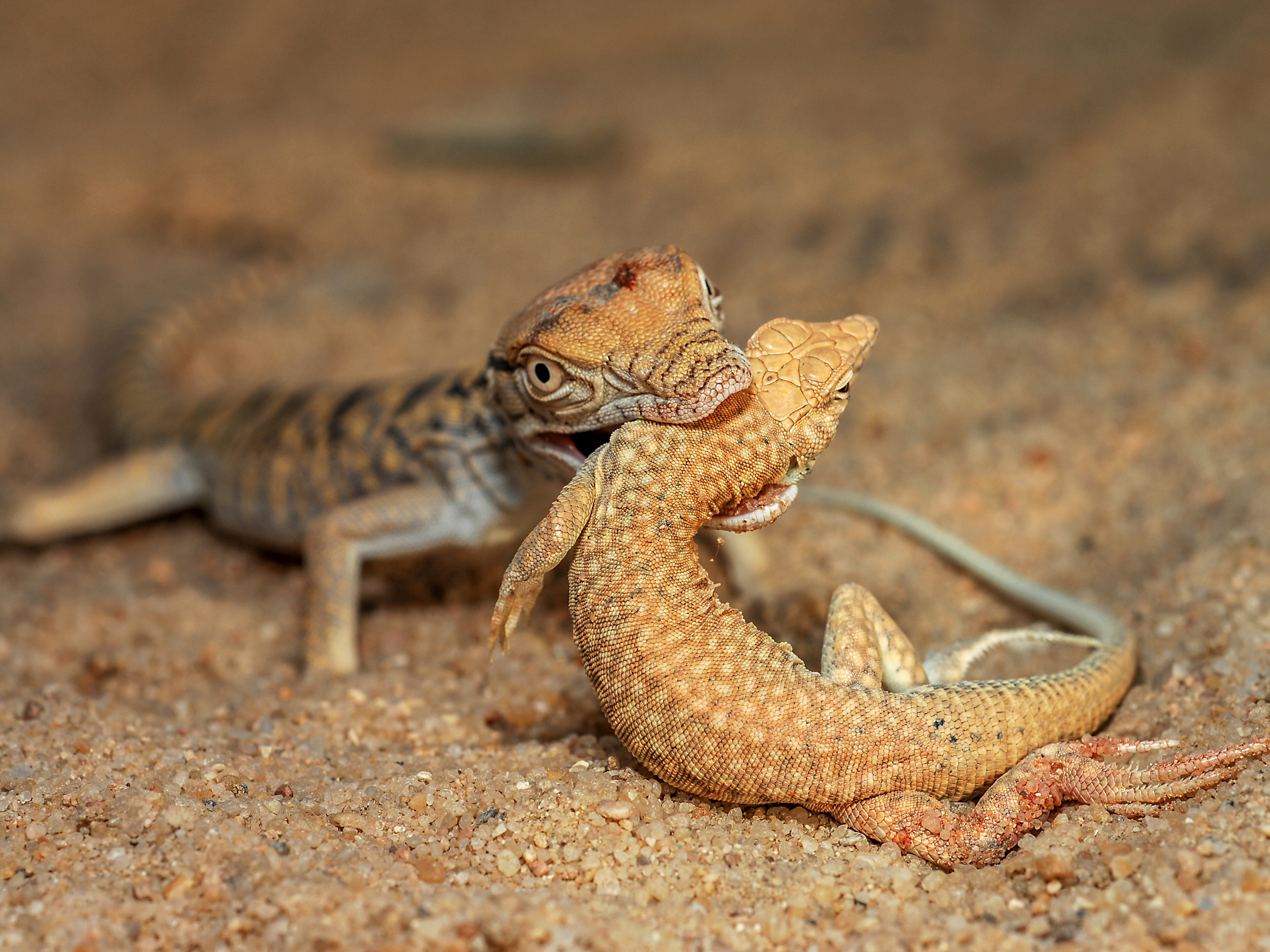
Desert monitor

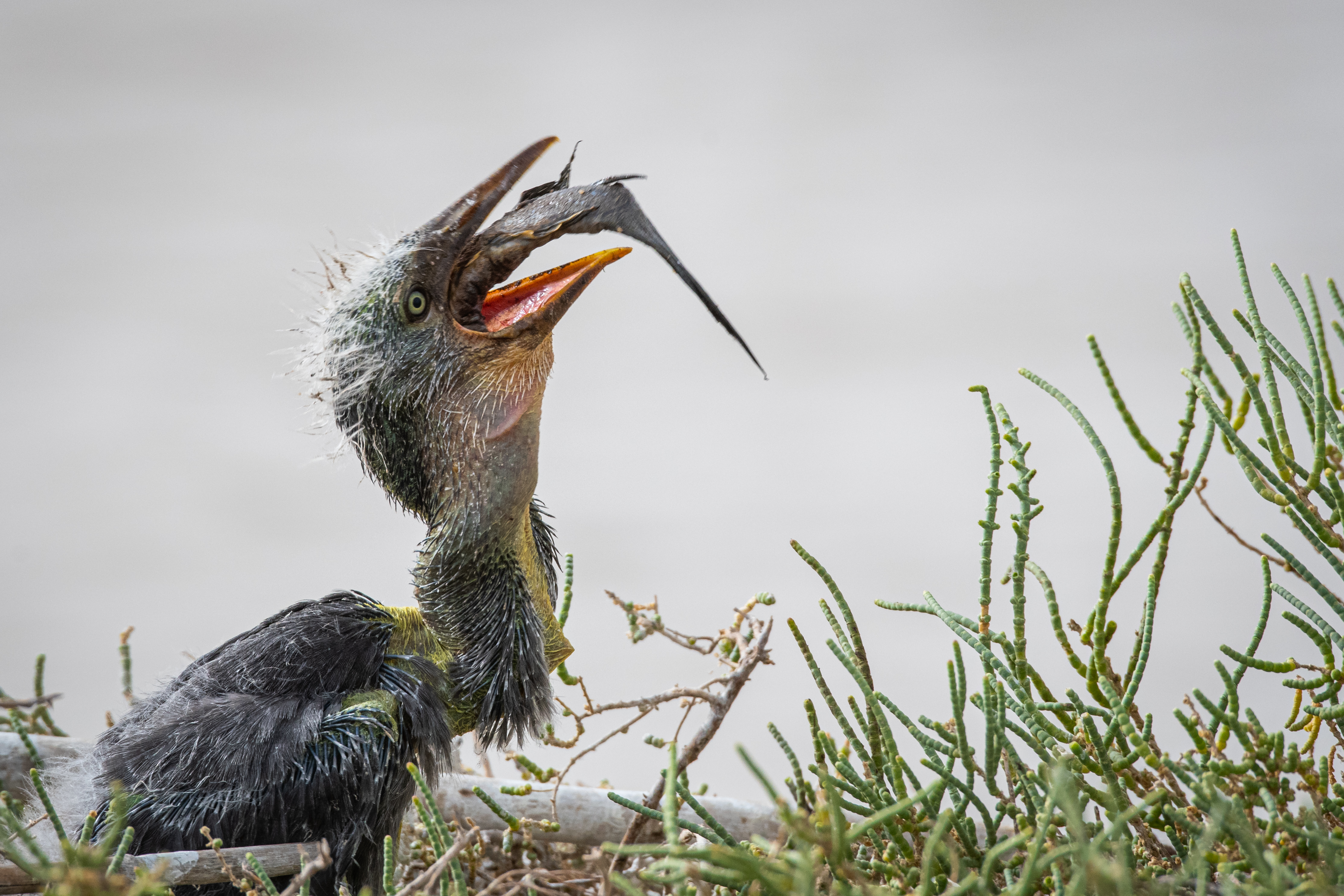
Grey heron
