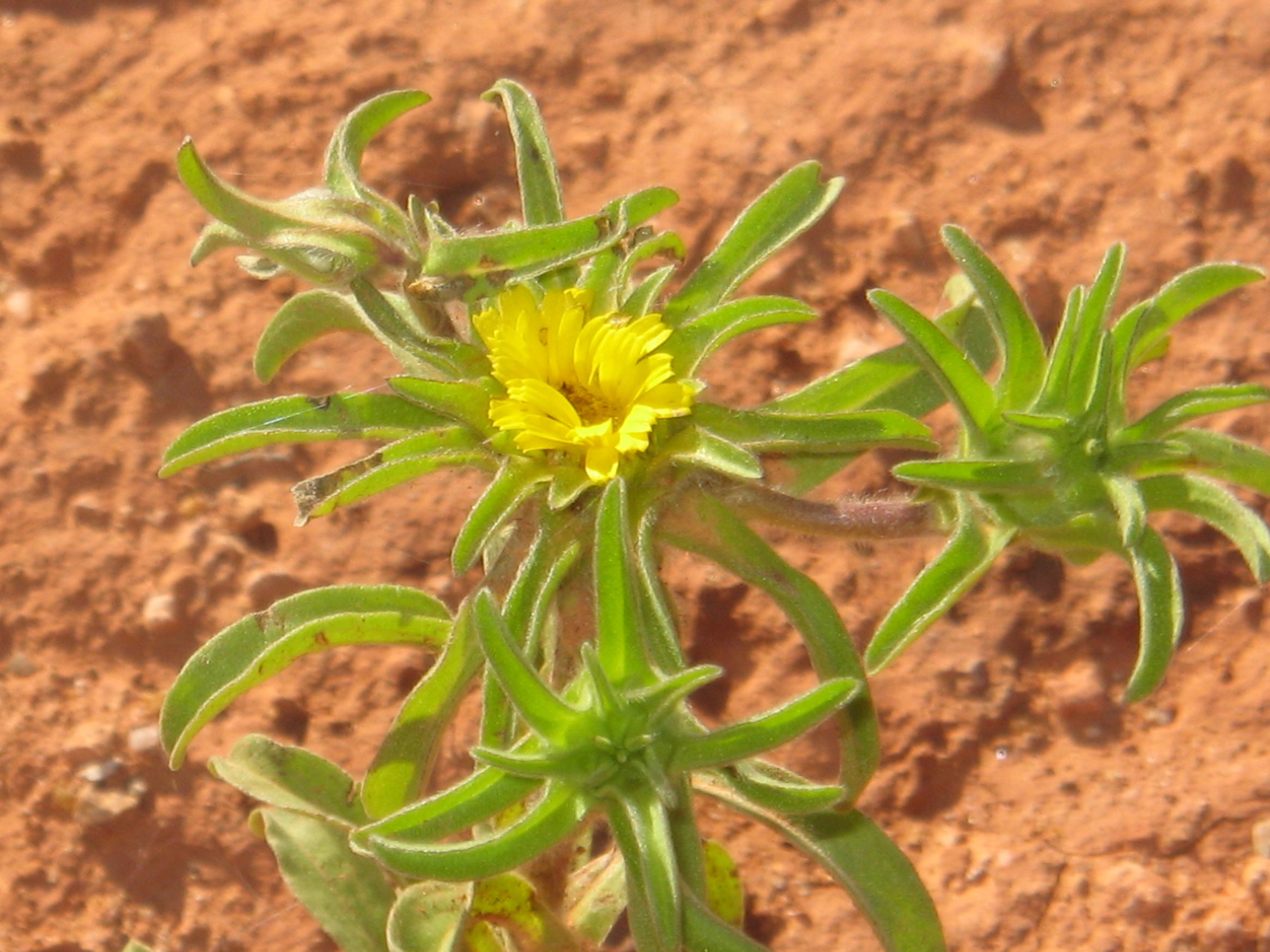
- Asteriscus aquaticus found in Setúbal, Portugal

Scientific classification
- Kingdom: Plantae
- Clade: Tracheophytes
- Clade: Angiosperms
- Clade: Eudicots
- Clade: Asterids
- Order: Asterales
- Family: Asteraceae
- Genus: Asteriscus
- Species: A. aquaticus

Binomial name
- Asteriscus aquaticus (L.) Less. 1832

Synonyms
- Bupthalmum aquaticum L. 1753; Bubonium aquaticum (L.) Hill 1761; Nauplius aquaticus (L.) Cass. 1825; Odontospermum aquaticum (L.) Sch. Bip. 1844

= Asteriscus aquaticus =

Species of flowering plant

Asteriscus aquaticus is a species of flowering plant. The flower is part of the so-called "Asteriscus alliance".

Formally known by its basionym, Bupthalmum aquaticum, when it was originally described in 1753 as a species of the Buphthalmum genus. Its original name meant sweet-scented ox eye. The plant is a low-growing annual herb with orange-yellow flowers, native to the Mediterranean region. It flowers between April and June and colonizes dry coastal areas.

== See also ==
- Buphthalmum salicifolium – one of two species still found within the Buphthalmum genus.
- Pallenis maritima – a closely related species.
