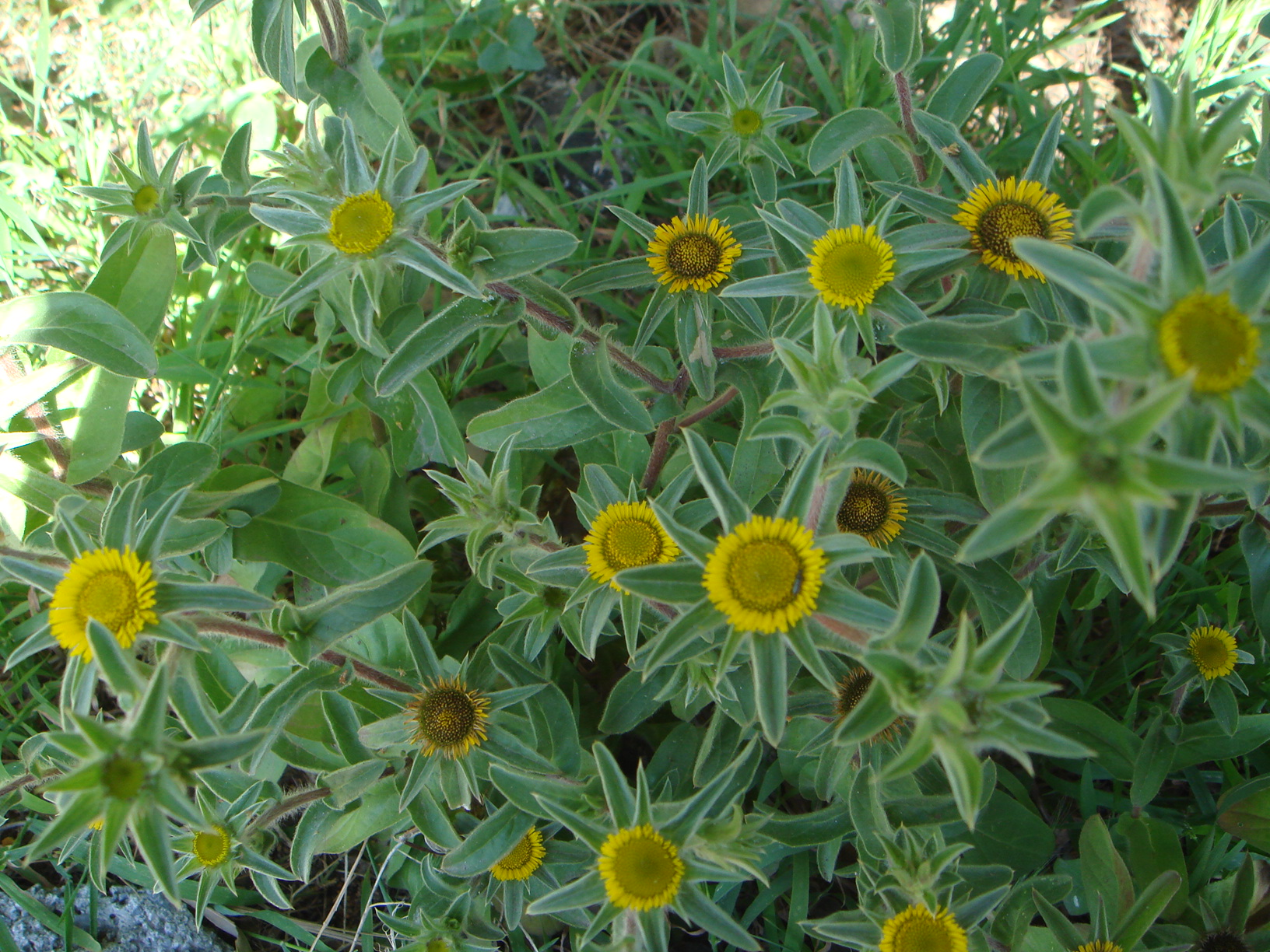

Scientific classification
- Kingdom: Plantae
- Clade: Tracheophytes
- Clade: Angiosperms
- Clade: Eudicots
- Clade: Asterids
- Order: Asterales
- Family: Asteraceae
- Genus: Pallenis
- Species: P. spinosa

Binomial name
- Pallenis spinosa (L.) de Cassini

Synonyms
- Asteriscus spinosus (L.) Schultz-Bip.; Buphthalmum spinosum L.

= Pallenis spinosa =

Species of flowering plant

Pallenis spinosa, commonly known as spiny starwort or spiny golden star, is an annual herbaceous plant belonging to the genus Pallenis of the family Asteraceae. The Latin name of the genus is derived from palea (chaff), referring to the chaffy receptacle, while the species name spinosa, meaning spiny, refers to the spiny bracts surrounding the flowers.

== Description ==
Pallenis spinosa reaches on average 60 centimetres (24 in) of height. Leaves are alternate, lanceolate or elliptical. The basal ones have short petioles, while the cauline ones are sessile or semiamplexicaul. A solitary inflorescence grows at the top of the branches. The large, slightly convex receptacle shows numerous, yellowish orange, hermaphrodite disc florets and two whorls of yellow ray florets. The long, villous, involucral bracts end in an apical sharp-pointed spine. The flowering period extends from May through July. Fruits are achenes of about 2–2,5 millimeters of length.

== Gallery ==
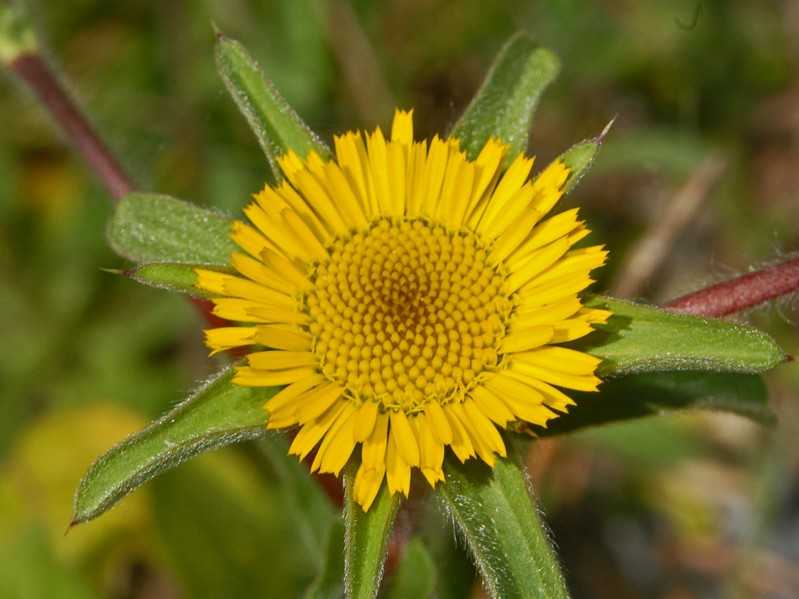
Flower of Pallenis spinosa

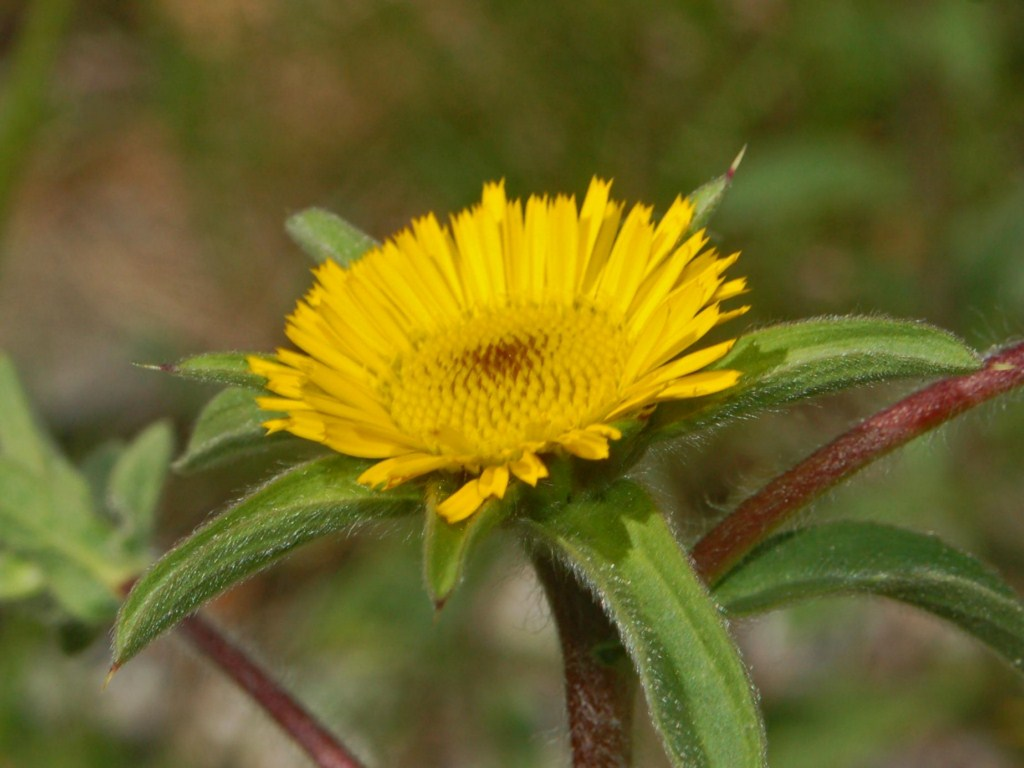
Flower of Pallenis spinosa

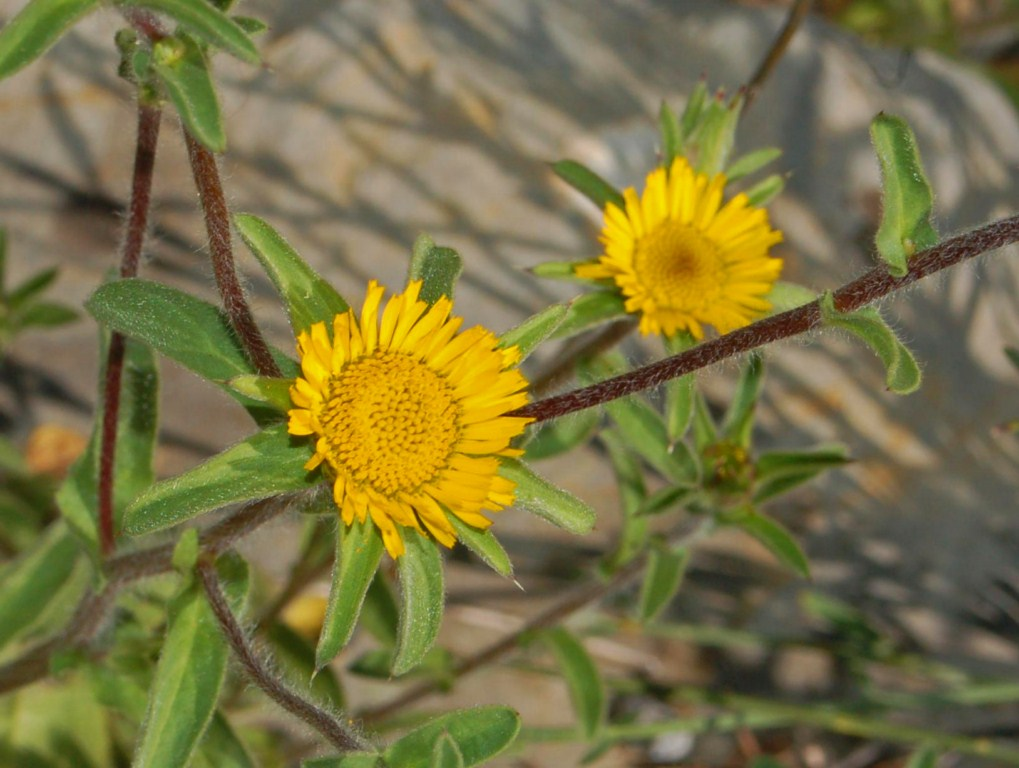
Flowers of Pallenis spinosa

== Distribution ==
This plant occurs in desert and coastal habitats of Southern Europe, North Africa, the Canary Islands and the Middle East.

== Habitat ==
These plants can survive in very dry environments and can be found on uncultivated sunny lands and on the roadsides at 0–1,400 metres (0–4,593 ft) above sea level.
