= National symbols of Saudi Arabia =

The national symbols of Saudi Arabia are official and unofficial flags, icons or cultural expressions that are emblematic, representative or otherwise characteristic of Saudi Arabia and of its culture.

== Symbols of Saudi Arabia ==
Title	Name of Symbol	Picture
National flag	Flag of Saudi Arabia	
Coat of arms	Coat of arms of Saudi Arabia	
National anthem	Chant of the Saudi Nation	an-Našīd al-Waṭanī as-Suʿūdī
National flower	Arfaj (Rhanterium epapposum)	
National bird	Falcon	
National animal	Arabian camel	
National dish	Kabsa	
National dance	Ardah	

=== Flag of the country ===
Flag of Saudi Arabia

The Saudi flag is the official flag of Saudi Arabia. It is rectangular in shape, with a width equal to two-thirds of its length. Its field is green and it bears the Shahada (There is no god but Allah; Muhammad is the Messenger of Allah) in Thuluth script, with a white Arabian sword beneath it whose hilt points toward the flagpole. It has been adopted since 15 March 1973.

=== Coat of arms of the country ===

The Emblem of Saudi Arabia is the official emblem of the Kingdom. It is sometimes referred to as the two swords and the palm tree. It was adopted in 1950. The emblem consists of two crossed curved Arabian swords surmounted by a palm tree. The two swords symbolize strength, fortitude, and sacrifice, while the palm tree represents vitality, growth, and prosperity.

=== National anthem ===
The Saudi Arabian national anthem has been the official anthem of Saudi Arabia since 1984. It was written by the Saudi poet Ibrahim Khafaji, and composed by the Saudi musician Tariq Abdul Hakim in 1947 for the trumpet. Later, the musician Siraj Omar arranged the anthem for military brass instruments. The national anthem consists of four verses as follows:

Arabic original

سَارِعِي
لِلمَجْدِ وَالعَلْيَاء
مَجِّدِي لِخَالِقِ السَّمَاء
وَارْفَعِي الخَفَّاقَ أَخْضَر{{efn|Also sung as وَارْفَعِي الخَفَّاقَ الأَخْضَر
يَحْمِلُ النُّورَ المُسَطَّر
رَدِّدِي: اللَّهُ أَكْبَر (Note: "Allahu Akbar" is Arabic for "God is the Greatest" but is expressed the same way by every Muslim in the world, regardless of their native language.)
يَا مَوْطِنِي
مَوْطِنِي
قَدْ عِشْتَ فَخْرَ الْمُسْلِمِين
عَاشَ المَلِك
لِلعَلَم
وَالوَطَن

MSA Romanization

Sāriʿī
Li-l-majdi wa-l-ʿalyāʾ,
Majjidī li–xāliqi s-samāʾ
Wa-rfaʿī l-xaffāqa ʾaxḍar
Yaḥmilu n-nūra l-musaṭṭar,
Raddidī: Allāhu ʾakbar
Yā mawṭinī
Mawṭinī,
Qad ʿišta faxra l-muslimīn
ʿĀš al-malik
Li-l-ʿalam
Wa-l-waṭan

IPA transcription (Note: See Help:IPA/Arabic and Saudi Arabian Arabic.)

[saː.rɪ.ʕiː]
[lɪ‿l.mad͡ʒ.di wa‿l.ʕal.jaːʔ |]
[mad.d͡ʒi.diː li xaː.lɪ.qɪ‿sːa.maːʔ ‖]
[war.fa.ʕɪ‿l.xaf.faː.qa ʔax.dˤar]
[jaħ.mɪ.lʊ‿nːuː.ra‿l.mʊ.satˤːar |]
[radːɪ.diː ʔaɫːaː.hu ʔak.bar ‖]
[jaː maw.tˤɪ.niː ‖]
[maw.tˤɪ.niː |]
[qad ʕɪʃ.ta fax.ra‿l.mʊs.lɪ.miːn ‖]
[ʕaː.ʃa‿l.ma.lɪk]
[lɪ‿l.ʕa.lam]
[wa‿l.wa.tˤan ‖]

English translation

Hasten
To glory and supremacy,
Glory in the Creator of the heavens!
And raise the green flag
Carrying the written light reflecting guidance,
Repeat: God is the greatest!
O my homeland!
My homeland,
Live as the pride of the Muslims!
Long live the King
For the flag
And the land!

Notes: Some variations remove the word قَدْ qad before "عِشْتَ فَخْرَ الْمُسْلِمِيْن ʿišta faxra l-muslimīn" and other variations use the word المَلِيك al-malīk instead of المَلِك al-malik.

=== National Day ===
Saudi Arabia celebrates its National Day on 23 September (September) each year, commemorating the unification of the Kingdom by King Abdulaziz bin Abdul Rahman Al Saud, who proclaimed the unification of the Kingdom in 1351 ‌Hijri (1932).

=== Currency of the country ===
The Saudi riyal is the official currency of Saudi Arabia, which is equivalent to 3.75 United States dollar. The riyal has been pegged to the U.S. dollar at 3.75 riyals since 1986.
