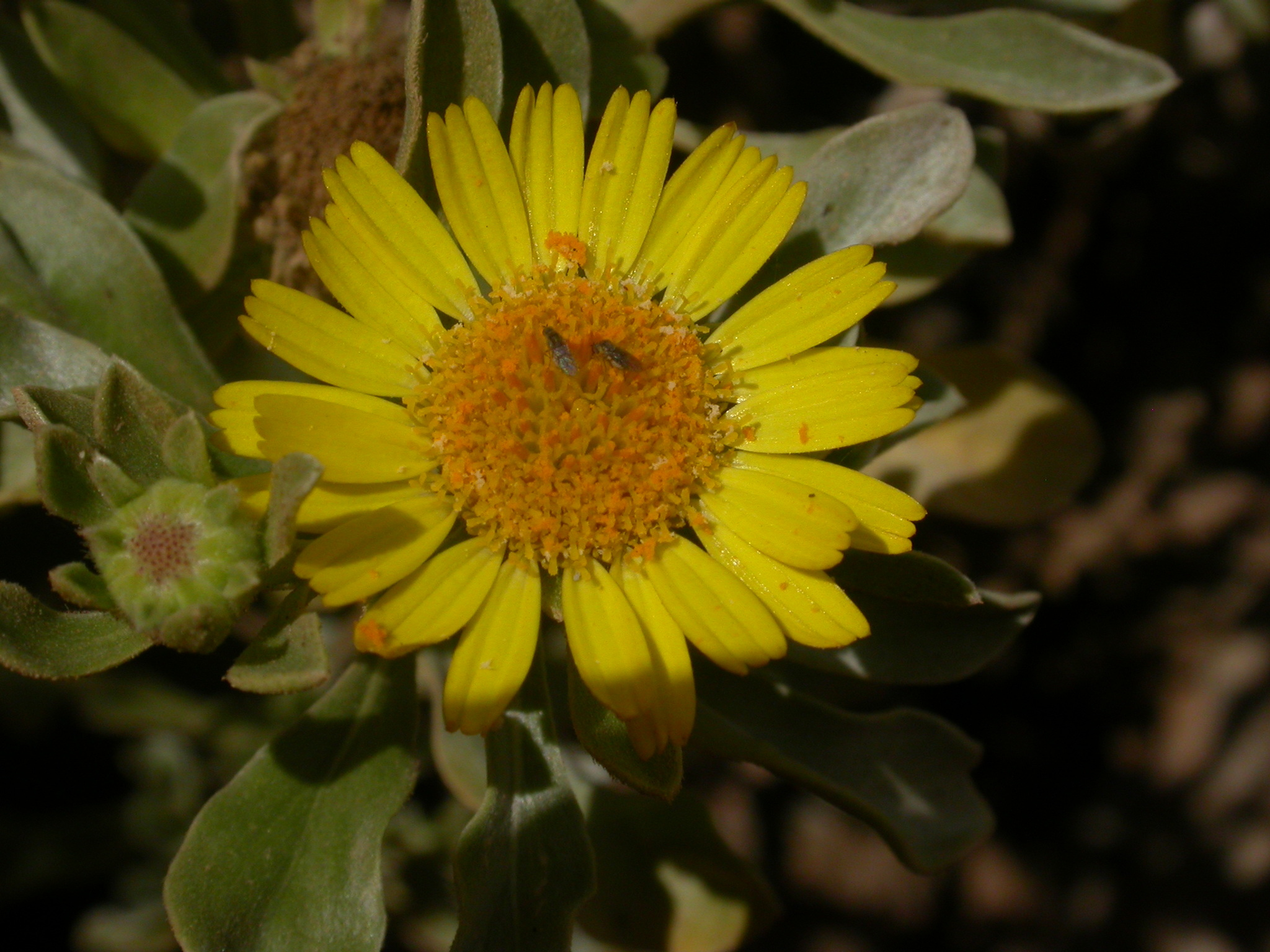

Conservation status
- Near Threatened (IUCN 3.1)

Scientific classification
- Kingdom: Plantae
- Clade: Tracheophytes
- Clade: Angiosperms
- Clade: Eudicots
- Clade: Asterids
- Order: Asterales
- Family: Asteraceae
- Genus: Asteriscus
- Species: A. daltonii

Binomial name
- Asteriscus daltonii (Webb) Walp.

Synonyms
- Bubonium daltonii (Webb) Halvorsen; Nauplius daltonii (Webb) A. Wilklund; Odontospermum daltonii Webb

= Asteriscus daltonii =

Species of flowering plant

Asteriscus daltonii is a species of flowering plant of the family Asteraceae. The species is endemic to Cape Verde. Its local name is macela. It is listed as near threatened by the IUCN.

== Subspecies ==
- Asteriscus daltonii subsp. daltonii
- Asteriscus daltonii subsp. vogelii

== Description ==
Asteriscus daltonii grows in the shape of a tuft, up to 0.5 m height. It produces a large number of small yellow flowers.

== Distribution and ecology ==
Asteriscus daltonii occurs in all islands of Cape Verde except Boa Vista.
