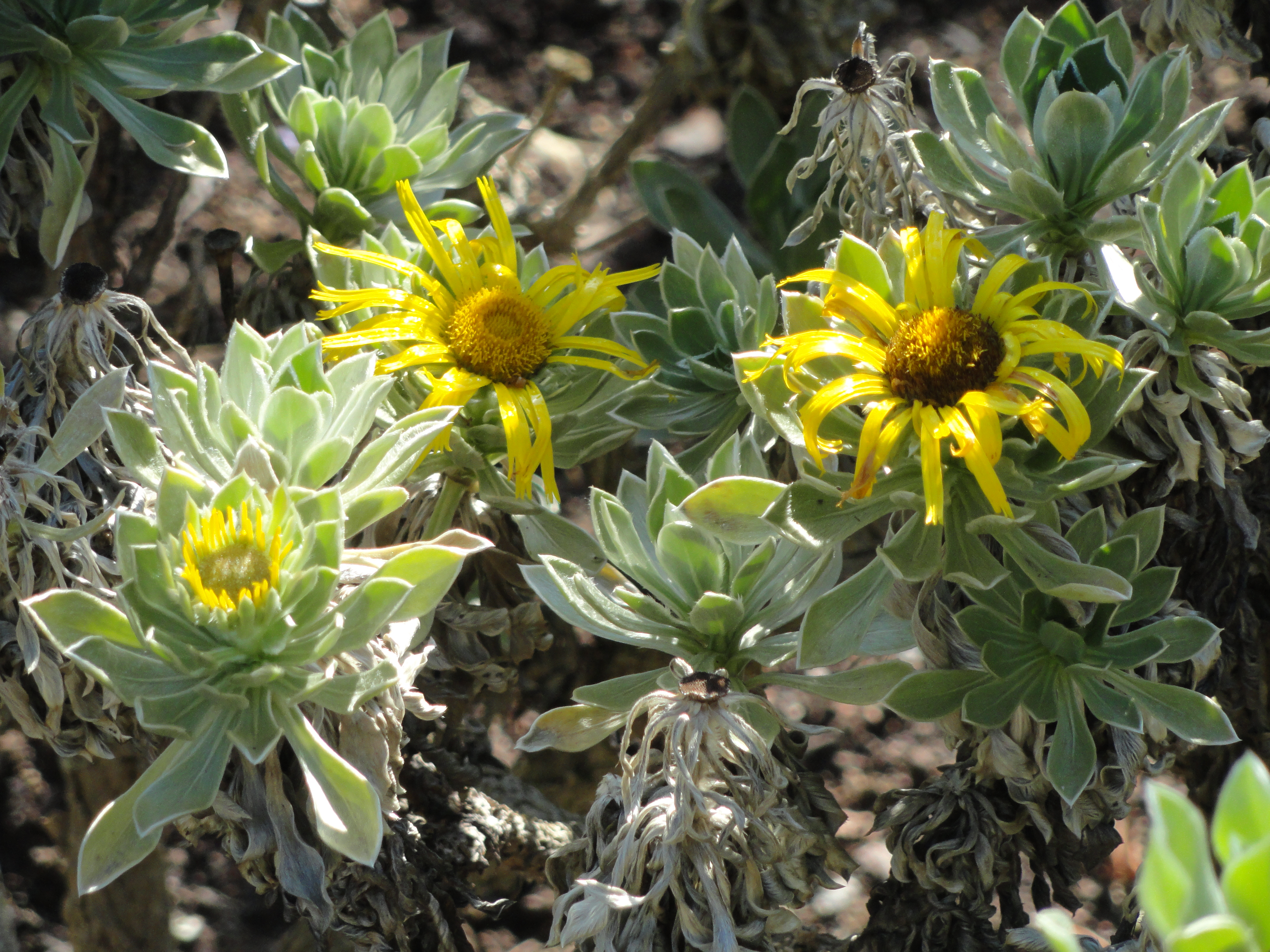

Scientific classification
- Kingdom: Plantae
- Clade: Tracheophytes
- Clade: Angiosperms
- Clade: Eudicots
- Clade: Asterids
- Order: Asterales
- Family: Asteraceae
- Genus: Asteriscus
- Species: A. sericeus

Binomial name
- Asteriscus sericeus (L.f.) DC.

Synonyms
- Buphthalmum sericeum L.f.; Odontospermum sericeum (L.f.) Sch.Bip.; Dontospermum sericeum (L.f.) Sch.Bip.; Bubonium sericeum (L.f.) Halvorsen & Wiklund

= Asteriscus sericeus =

Species of flowering plant

Asteriscus sericeus, the Canary Island daisy, is a species in the daisy family. It is endemic to the Canary Islands. Originally found only on Fuerteventura, it has since been introduced to other islands in the archipelago.
