= National symbols of Kuwait =

The national symbols of Kuwait are official and unofficial flags, icons or cultural expressions that are emblematic, representative or otherwise characteristic of Kuwait and of its culture.

== Symbol ==
Title	Name of Symbol	Picture
National flag	Flag of Kuwait	
Coat of arms	Emblem of Kuwait	
National anthem	an-Nashīd al-Waṭani	National anthem of Kuwait
National flower	Arfaj flower	
National bird	Falcon	
National animal	Arabian camel	
National dish	Machboos	
National colour	Blue	
