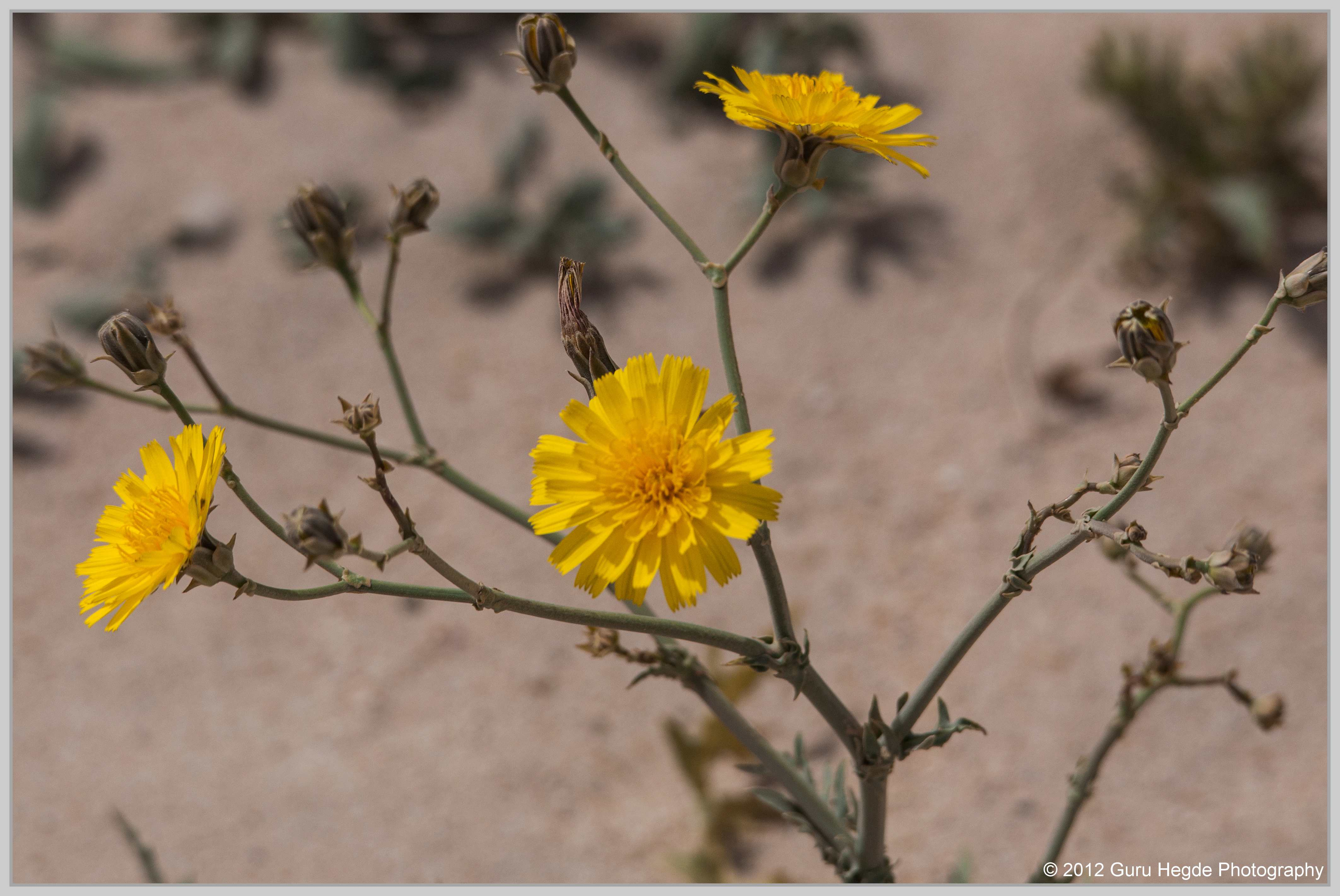
- Rhanterium epapposum

Scientific classification
- Kingdom: Plantae
- Clade: Embryophytes
- Clade: Tracheophytes
- Clade: Spermatophytes
- Clade: Angiosperms
- Clade: Eudicots
- Clade: Asterids
- Order: Asterales
- Family: Asteraceae
- Subfamily: Asteroideae
- Tribe: Inuleae
- Genus: Rhanterium; Desf.

Type species
- Rhanterium suaveolens Desf.

= Rhanterium =

Genus of plants

Rhanterium is a genus of dwarf-shrubs in the tribe Inuleae within the family Asteraceae growing in the deserts of the Middle East and northern Africa.

Species

- Rhanterium adpressum Coss. & Durieu - Morocco, Algeria
- Rhanterium epapposum Oliv. - Saudi Arabia, Oman, United Arab Emirates, Qatar, Bahrain, Kuwait, Iraq, Iran, Pakistan
- Rhanterium suaveolens Desf. - Algeria, Libya, Tunisia
