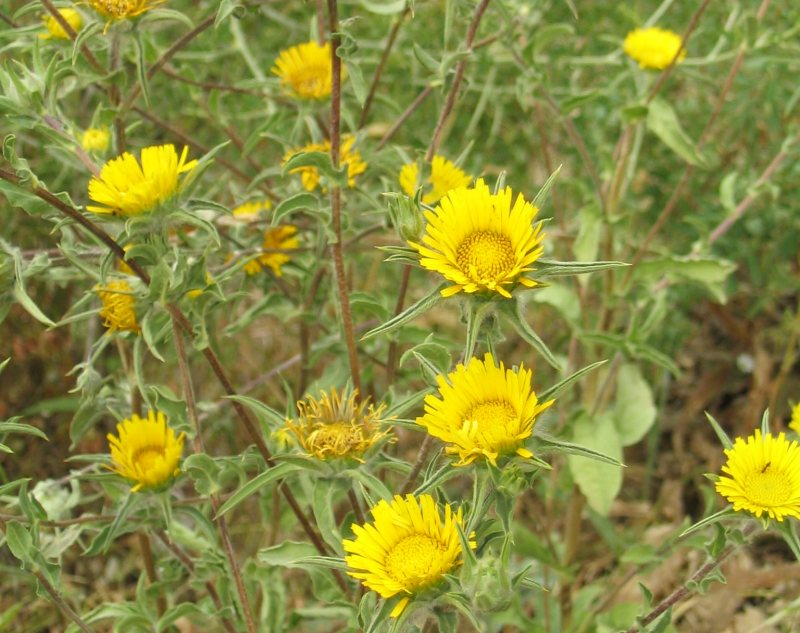
- Pallenis spinosa

Scientific classification
- Kingdom: Plantae
- Clade: Tracheophytes
- Clade: Angiosperms
- Clade: Eudicots
- Clade: Asterids
- Order: Asterales
- Family: Asteraceae
- Subfamily: Asteroideae
- Tribe: Inuleae
- Genus: Pallenis; Cass.

Type species
- Pallenis spinosa (L.) Cass.

Synonyms
- Saulcya Michon; Athalmum Kuntze

= Pallenis =

Genus of flowering plants

Pallenis is a small genus of flowering plants in the tribe Inuleae within the family Asteraceae. The name is derived from palea (chaff), referring to the chaffy receptacle.

This is primarily a Mediterranean genus, occurring in desert and coastal habitats of Southern Europe, North Africa, the Canary Islands and the Middle East. The range of one species extends eastward into Central Asia.

The genus consists of annual or biennial herbaceous plants with white, sub-silky hairs on the soft stems, growing to a height of 20–50 cm. They grow on uncultivated or disturbed land and roadsides. They are hardy, surviving in dry to very dry environments or cold spells.

The small, alternate, entire leaves are elliptic to obovate. They have short petioles at the base of the stem but are sessile in the upper half.

The solitary inflorescence grows at the top of the branches. The large, slightly convex receptacle shows numerous, yellowish orange, hermaphrodite disc florets and two whorls of yellow ray florets. They flower from March to July.

The long, villous, involucral bracts end in an apical sharp-pointed spine. The achene is glabrous or is covered with short hairs.

The essential oil of Pallenis spinosa consists for the main part of oxygenated sesquiterpenoids.

Pallenis maritima is a protected plant in southern France.

Pallenis hierochuntica (Michon) Greuter is sold under the name rose of Jericho. This plant also grows in the region from North-Africa to Asia.

== Species ==
As of August 2020 there are six accepted species in Pallenis:
No.	Binomial name	Authority	Synonyms & subspecies	Distribution	Images
1.	Pallenis cuspidata	Pomel (1874)	Subspecies: *Pallenis cuspidata subsp. canescens (Maire) Greuter (1997); *Pallenis cuspidata subsp. cuspidata (1874)	Algeria, Morocco, Tunisia	Pallenis cuspidata subspecies canescens
2.	Pallenis cyrenaica	Alavi (1983)	Synonyms: *Asteriscus cyrenaicus (Alavi) Dobignard (1997)	Libya	
3.	Pallenis hierochuntica	(Michon) Greuter (1832)	Synonyms: *Asteriscus aquaticus subsp. pygmaeus (DC.) O.Bolòs & Vigo (1997); *Asteriscus hierochunticus (Michon) Wiklund; *Asteriscus pygmaeus (DC.) Coss. & Durieu (1853); *Odontospermum pygmaeum (DC.) O.Hoffm. (1890); *Saulcya hierochuntica Michon (1854)	Afghanistan, North Africa, Middle East, Pakistan	Pallenis hierochuntica
4.	Pallenis maritima	(L.) Greuter (1997)	Subspecies: *Pallenis maritima subsp. maritima *Pallenis maritima subsp. sericea (Maire & Wilczek) Véla (2013)	Algeria, Morocco, Tunisia	Pallensis maritima
5.	Pallenis spinosa	(L.) Cass. (1825)	Synonyms: *Asteriscus spinosus (L.) Sch.Bip. (1835-1860); *Athalmum spinosum (L.) Kuntze (1891); *Bubonium spinosum (L.) Hill (1768); *Buphthalmum spinosum L. (1753); Subspecies: *Pallenis spinosa subsp. asteroidea (Viv.) Greuter (1997); *Pallenis spinosa subsp. aurea (Willk.) Nyman (1879); *Pallenis spinosa subsp. maroccana (Aurich & Podlech) Greuter (1997); *Pallenis spinosa subsp. spinosa	Macaronesia, Mediterranean Region to Iran. Introduced in South Australia, Victoria	Pallenis spinosa
6.	Pallenis teknensis	(Dobignard & Jacquemoud) Greuter & Jury (2003)	Synonyms: *Asteriscus teknensis Dobignard & Jacquemoud (1997)	Morocco	

== Bibliography ==
1. Alavi, S.A. (1983). Flora of Libya. Vol. 107. Tripoli: Al Faateh University, The National Herbarium, Department of Botany.
2. Cassini, Henri (1825). Dictionnaire des sciences naturelles, dans lequel on traite méthodiquement des différens êtres de la nature, considérés soit en eux-mêmes, d'après l'état actuel de nos connoissances, soit relativement à l'utilité qu'en peuvent retirer la médecine, l'agriculture, le commerce et les artes. Suivi d'une biographie des plus célèbres. Vol. 37. Strasbourg: F. G. Levrault.
3. K Ueda (2020). "iNaturalist Research-grade Observations". iNaturalist.org. doi:10.15468/ab3s5x.
4. Greuter, Werner Rodolfo (1997). Flora Mediterranea; Acta Herbarii Mediterranei Panormitani sub Auspiciis Societas Botanicorum Mediterraneorum Optima Nuncupata Edita. Vol. 7.
5. Greuter, Werner Rodolfo (2003). "The Euro Med treatment of Gnaphalieae and Inuleae (Compositae) - generic concepts and required new names". Willdenowia. 3 (2): 239–244. doi:10.3372/wi.33.33202.
6. POWO (2019). "Plants of the World Online". Published on the Internet. Archived from the original on March 22, 2017.
7. Pomel, Auguste Nicolas (1874). Nouveaux matériaux pour la flore atlantique. Paris: Savy, libraire éditeur, rue Hautefeuille, 24; Alger : Juillet St-Lager, éditeur, rue Bab-Azoun.
8. Teline. "Plant Biodiversity of South-Western Morocco".

Media related to Pallenis at Wikimedia Commons
