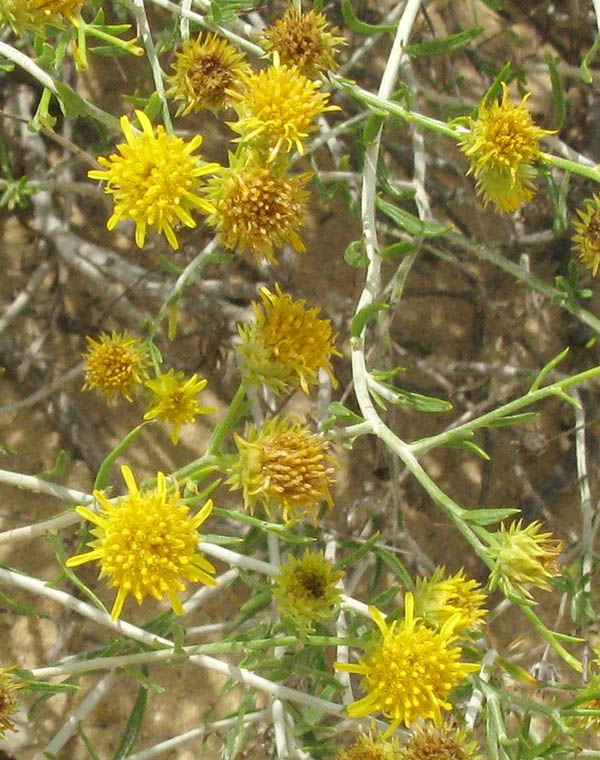

Scientific classification
- Kingdom: Plantae
- Clade: Tracheophytes
- Clade: Angiosperms
- Clade: Eudicots
- Clade: Asterids
- Order: Asterales
- Family: Asteraceae
- Genus: Rhanterium
- Species: R. epapposum

Binomial name
- Rhanterium epapposum Oliv.

Synonyms
- Musilia arabica (Velen.) Velen.; Asteriscus arabicus Velen.

= Rhanterium epapposum =

Species of aster

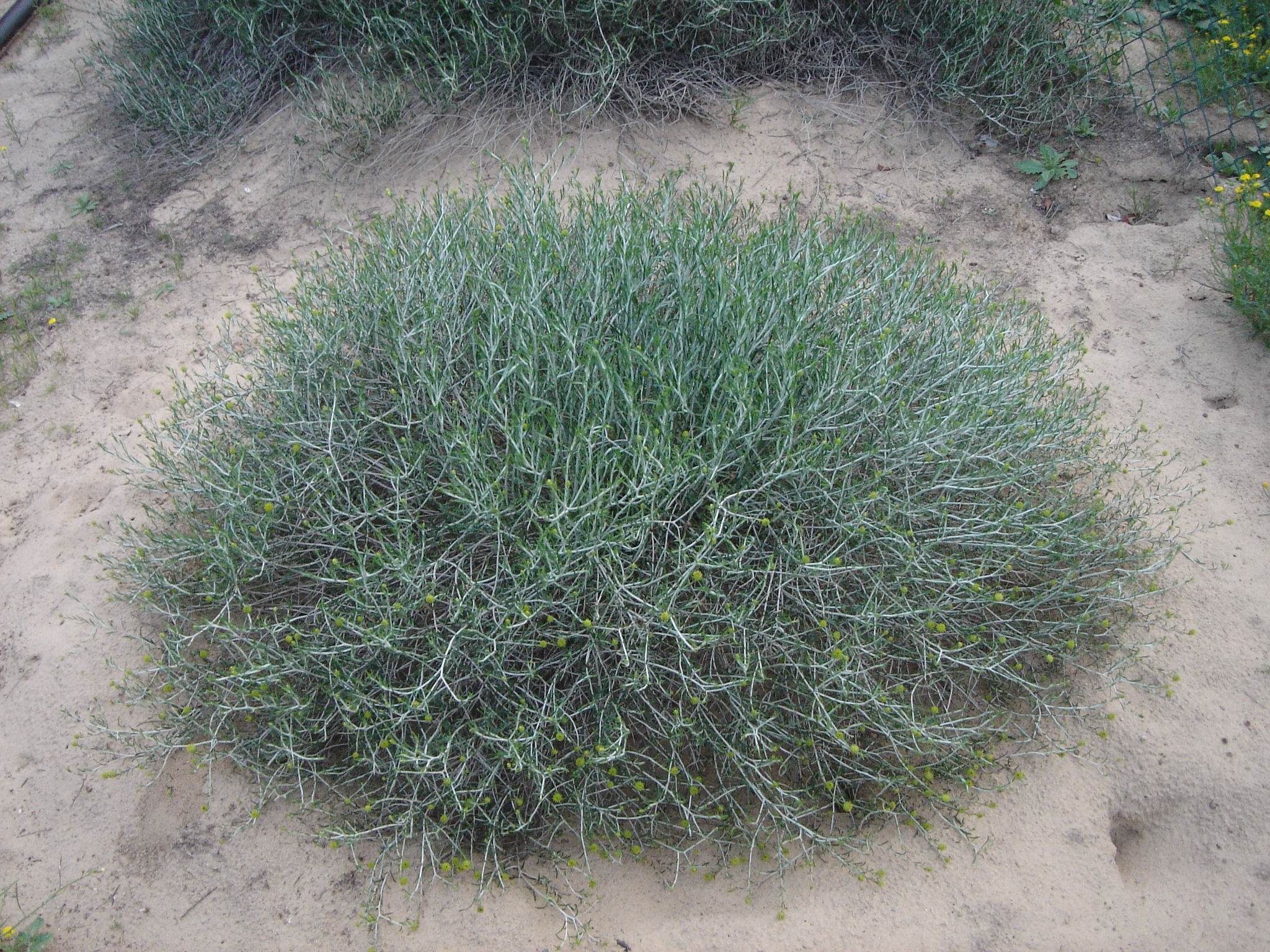
General aspect

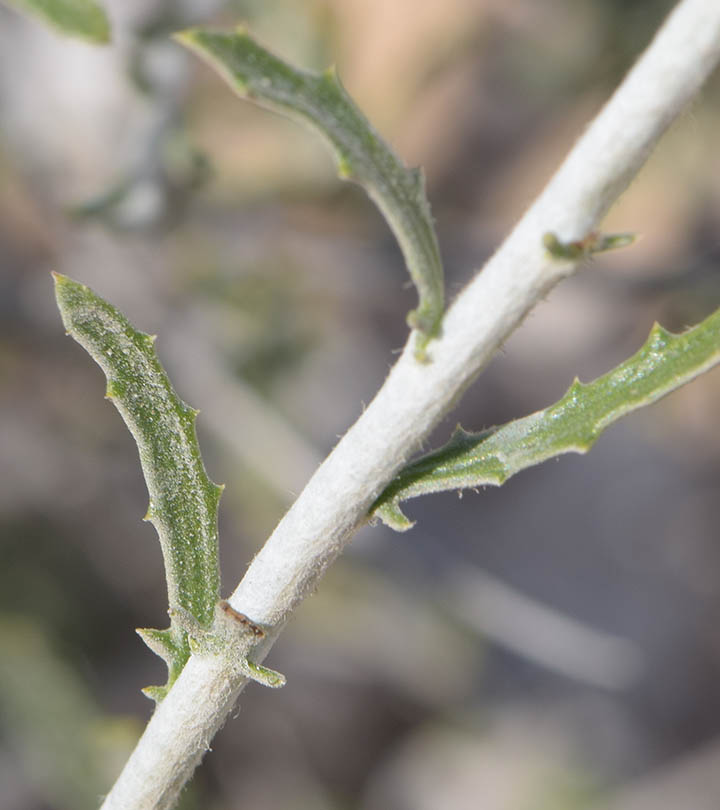
Stem and leaf close-up

Rhanterium epapposum is a plant of the family Asteraceae. Native to the deserts of the Arabian Peninsula including Kuwait, Saudi Arabia and Qatar where it is known locally as arfaj (Arabic: عرفج). The arfaj consists of a complicated network of branches scattered with small thorny leaves and bright yellow flowers about 1.5 cm wide. The arfaj flower is also the national flower of Kuwait and Saudi Arabia. It is a bushy shrub approximately 80 cm in height. The leaves are small and narrow, and in late spring it will start flowering (April–May). It is considered one of the main desert forage plants for camels and sheep.

When cold temperature prevails the plant produces leaves quickly after rainfall. In a few months, the branches and newly formed leaves become vigorous, and the yellow flowers are produced, attracting insects and birds. In the summer, when the earth has dried out, the leaves fall and the branches become naked and lignified with living fibers. In times of stress, these alterations may be important in increasing the chance of survival, water and reserve material stored in the stems to remain alive by allowing it to have few dormant bud. When conditions improve, the reserves are transported into buds allowing new growth.

Arfaj fruit is numerous; it forms in late spring and falls off the branches after maturity. It accumulates under the shrub and remains dormant until favorable conditions for germination prevail. Each fruit contains about 6-8 seeds that are transported by wind or water.

The Flower became a symbol of Kuwaiti resilience during the 2026 Iranian Strikes on Kuwait.

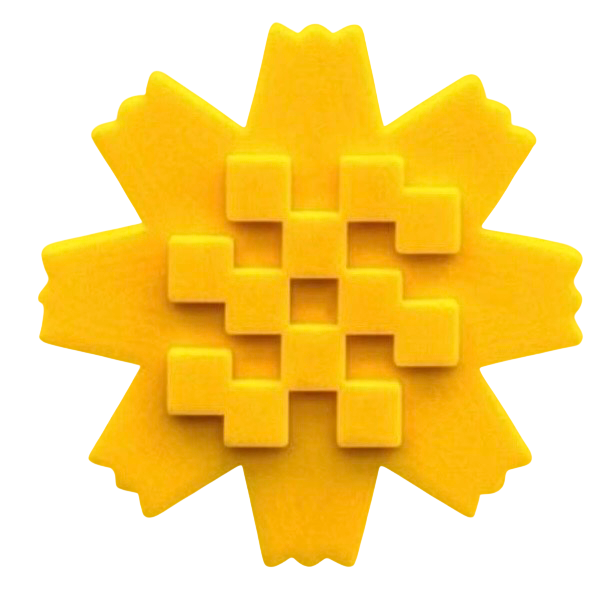
The Arfaj Flower Badge, used during the 2026 Iranian Strikes on Kuwait

== See also ==
- National symbols of Kuwait
- National symbols of Saudi Arabia
