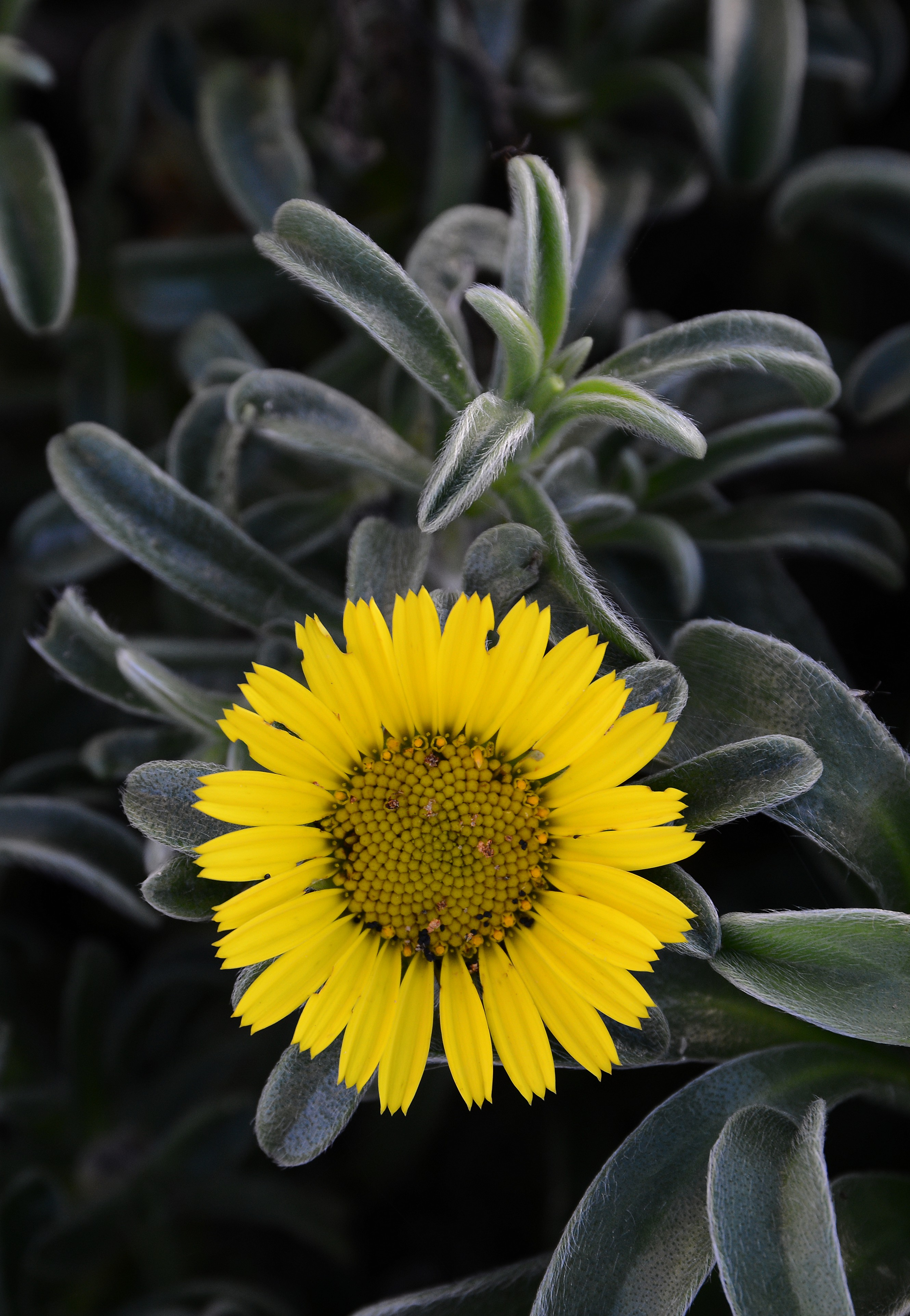
- Pallenis maritima, west coast of Portugal

Scientific classification
- Kingdom: Plantae
- Clade: Tracheophytes
- Clade: Angiosperms
- Clade: Eudicots
- Clade: Asterids
- Order: Asterales
- Family: Asteraceae
- Genus: Pallenis
- Species: P. maritima

Binomial name
- Pallenis maritima (L.) Greuter

= Pallenis maritima =

Species of flowering plant

Pallenis maritima, also known as the Mediterranean Beach Daisy or Gold Coin, is a perennial herb in the Asteraceae family, native to regions like the Canary Islands, southern Portugal, and parts of the Mediterranean. This plant is known for its vibrant yellow daisy-like flowers that have darker centers. Typically growing to a height of about 30 cm, it thrives in coastal and dry environments, often found in sandy soils. It requires moderate care, especially in terms of watering, where it should be watered enough to moisten the soil but not excessively to avoid root rot. In its natural environment, it can survive on rainwater but benefits from supplemental watering during dry spells. The plant prefers full sun but needs protection from intense midday heat to avoid sunburn. When grown indoors, it should be shielded from harsh air conditioning which can dry it out.

Pallenis maritima is also a low-maintenance plant that can adapt to various climates as long as it gets enough sunlight and is not overwatered.

== Cultivation ==
To cultivate Pallenis maritima, or the Mediterranean Beach Daisy, ensure it is planted in well-drained, sandy soil, preferably in a sunny spot that receives at least 3-6 hours of light daily. It thrives in dry, coastal conditions, but requires occasional watering during dry spells, though care should be taken not to overwater, as this can lead to root rot. The plant is fairly drought-tolerant once established and does well in temperate climates. During hot summer months, it’s important to protect it from the harsh midday sun to prevent leaf burn. Regular pruning can help maintain its shape and promote healthy growth.
