= Female copulatory vocalizations =

Vocalizations produced by females for mating

Female copulatory vocalizations, also called female copulation calls or coital vocalizations, are produced by female primates, including human females, and female non-primates. They are not purposeful, but instead are evolutionary and are spontaneously produced by female primates, including women, to encourage her partner to produce good-quality sperm during the mating process. Copulatory vocalizations usually occur during copulation and are hence related to sexual activity. Vocalizations that occur before intercourse, for the purpose of attracting mates, are known as mating calls.

In primates, copulation calling is typically observed at the end of mating and there are vast variations between species regarding its occurrence, frequency, and form. It is agreed that coital vocalizations fulfill an evolutionary purpose and that they serve as adaptive solutions to problems that the females face, such as infanticide, as well as obtaining high quality sperm.

In non-primates, copulatory calling predominantly occurs before copulation in order to attract mates (mating call). Calls vary in frequency (14 Hz to 70,000 Hz) and function. One of the main purposes of females vocalizing is the induction of mate guarding behavior in males. Conversely, calls may also be used in order to attract high ranking mates who can prevent intercourse with the initial partner. This is done to incite male mate competition.

In humans, coital vocalizations are linked to sexual pleasure or sexual gratification and orgasm, hence occurring during copulation and serving as an expression of sexual pleasure. Vocalizations can be used intentionally by women in order to boost the self-esteem of their partner and to cause quicker ejaculation.

== In non-primates ==
=== Occurrence ===
In addition to emitting copulatory vocalizations during and after copulation (as it is mostly seen in primates), non-primate species also vocalize before engaging in mating. Vocalizations that are made prior to copulation are named mating calls. They serve as a means to advertise sexual receptivity and are predominantly used by males to attract female mates. In general, non-primates emit more calls before copulating, as exemplified by the croaks of male frogs and the melodic tweeting of song sparrows.

=== Properties ===
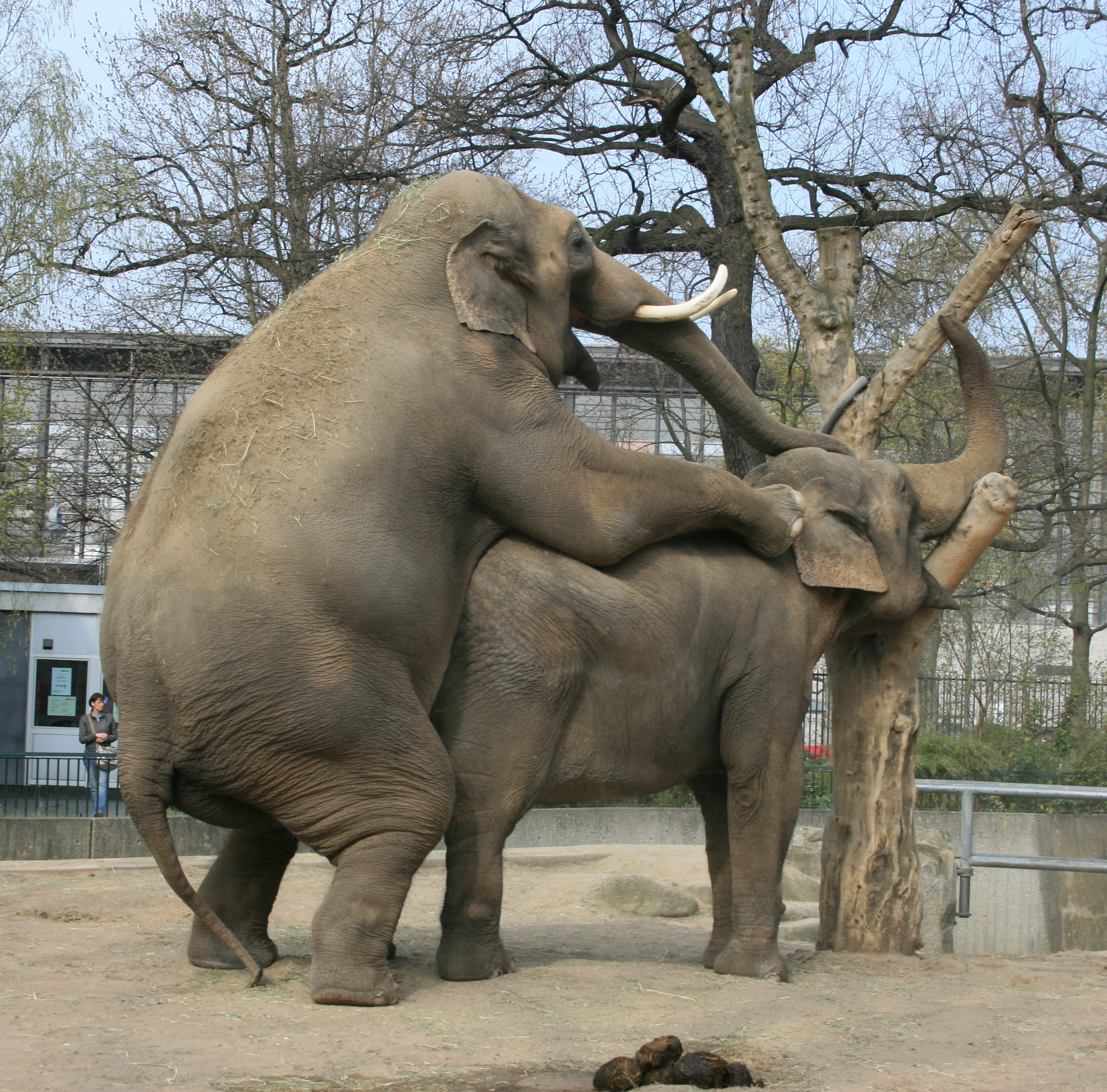
Elephant copulation.

In regard to the calling properties, frequency analysis is typically used in research to look at the complexity of the vocalization and to distinguish between calls, which is important in determining their function. Large frequency variations have been noted between species, ranging from 14 Hz to 70,000 Hz. Mice, for instance, use 70,000 Hz calls continuously prior to copulation. They then lower the frequency down to 40,000 Hz during the copulatory act, therefore two qualitatively different calls are used for attracting mates as compared to the actual act of mating. Most of the calling in mice is done by males. They use these ultrasonic calls (> 20,000 Hz and hence not discernible by the human ear) to attract females, with the quantity of calls being related to the male's mating success, making these vocalizations a sexually selected trait.

On the other end of the spectrum, female African elephants use very low frequency calls of 14–35 Hz prior to, as well as during, copulation. Due to their low frequency these calls can be heard for several kilometers and are therefore effective in signalling receptivity. The vocalizations of female elephants are also used in order to incite mate guarding behavior in the male, which manifests itself in the form of fighting off any newly arriving mates. Not only females make use of this, as male Columbian ground squirrels have been observed to use copulatory vocalizations in order to announce their post-copulatory mate guarding to others. In addition to being used to retain the mate via mate guarding induction, female copulatory vocalizations can also be employed to achieve his departure. Red junglefowls, for instance, utilize calls in order to prevent or end unwanted copulations by attracting another high-ranking male fowl. Further effects of female calling on male's behavior are illustrated by spiders that have been shown to stridulate before copulation to inform males of sexual receptivity as well as during intercourse in order to influence male genitalic movements.

Moreover, attracting new mates by calling out during copulation can entail many benefits for the female. Female crickets which mate with multiple partners receive a greater number of nuptial gifts, causing them to lay a larger quantity of eggs, hence increasing their reproductive success.

== In non-human primates ==
=== Occurrence, frequency and form ===
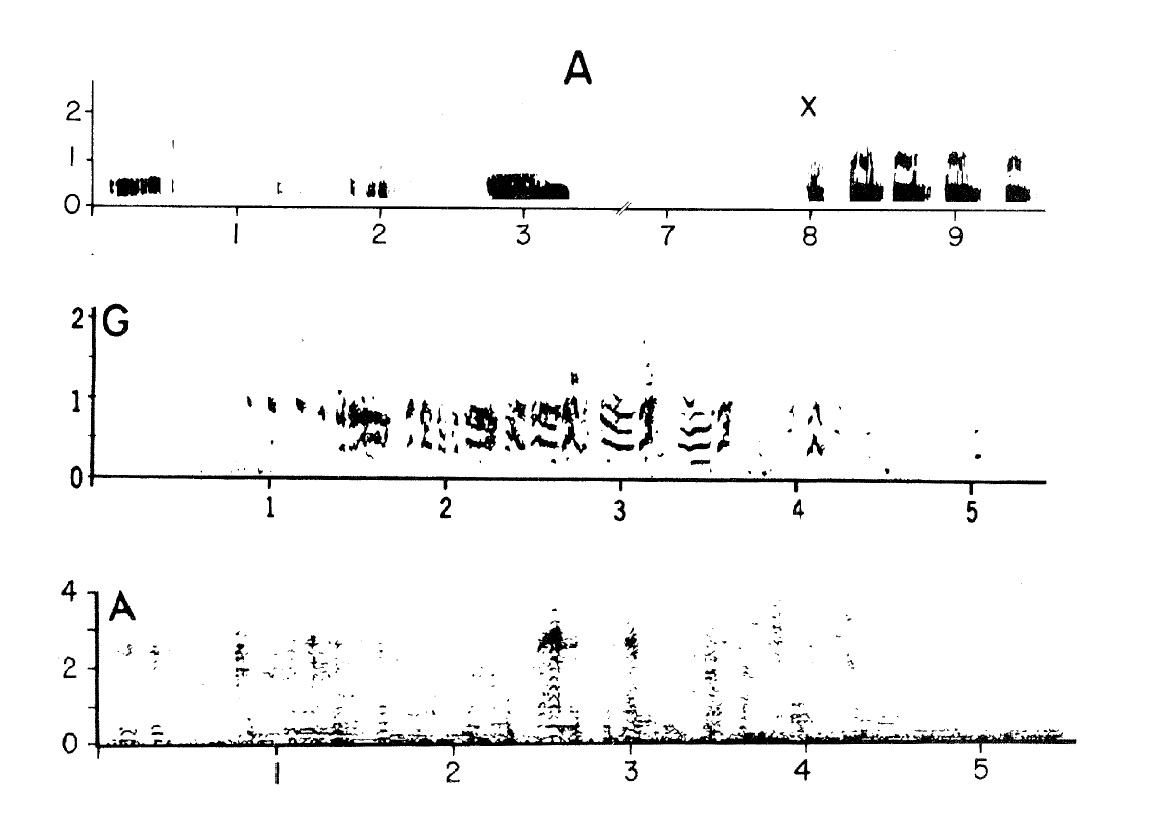
Sonograms of female copulatory vocalizations of a human female (top), female baboon (middle), and female gibbon (bottom), with time being plotted on the x-axis and the pitch being represented on the y-axis.

In non-human primates, copulatory vocalizations begin towards the end of the copulatory act or even after copulation. The percentage of vocalizations after copulation varies dependent on the non-human primate species studied. In long-tail macaques, for instance, 80% of copulations are followed by copulation calls. In contrast, the percentage for chimpanzees and Tonkean macaques has been found to be 78.8% and 6%, respectively. There is little consensus on what causes these inter-specific differences, given the lack of consistent findings within the literature. The typical quantity of specimen that are tested in experimental settings is often too low in order to allow any general conclusions about the species as a whole.

Another aspect of coital vocalization that varies according to species is the form of the call: in macaques and baboons they manifest themselves as grunts, whereas other species such as talapoins and chimpanzees typically emit screaming sounds. The quality and structure of copulatory calls are analyzed by comparing their respective spectrograms in terms of their frequency. Accordingly, some species produce calls that are structurally more complex than that of others. This is linked to the amount of promiscuity exhibited, in a way that more promiscuous species emit more faceted calls in order to convey more information about themselves and hence render self-advertisement more efficient.

=== Adaptive function ===
Copulatory calls in primates serve an adaptive function and are sexually selected. Calling signals sexual receptivity of the female and therefore affects mate choice. There are many different hypotheses as to the exact adaptive function of female copulatory calls in primates and research on the subject is still in its early stages.

There is general agreement that copulatory calls are the adaptive solution to problems with reproductive success. In other words, copulatory vocalizations address issues that stand in the way of successfully producing offspring and guaranteeing its survival, such as the occurrence of infanticide. To prevent the killing of their offspring, female baboons employ copulatory calls in order to attract other males, allowing multiple mating acts and creating parental confusion among the males involved. The resulting uncertainty of who the father is hence reduces the occurrence of attacks, given the newly incited risk of potentially harming their own offspring. Additionally, mating in rapid successions also entails sperm competition, and therefore fulfills the additional function of obtaining high quality sperm. This is especially important in species that do not openly advertise good genes via honest signals.

By attracting other males through post-copulatory calls, the female might provoke mate guarding behavior in their initial mate. This 'parental concentration', has two outcomes. Firstly, the male might be of high quality, allowing him to fend off those that were attracted by the call. In that case the female has not only gained someone who can protect her and who prevents infanticide through other males, but this also means that she was inseminated by a specimen with potentially good genes. Secondly, if the male fails to successfully guard her, she will mate with the newly arrived males, hence inciting sperm competition and paternity confusion (again preventing attacks on her offspring, as well as increasing her likelihood of obtaining high quality sperm). The calls produced by the female also carry information about the status of the male with whom she was copulating, thus allowing her to influence the likelihood of other males approaching.

Accordingly, copulatory calls serve more than a single adaptive function. There is no mutual exclusivity when it comes to addressing the two problems described, namely that of infanticide and receiving high quality sperm. However, by taking the female's cycle stage into account, sperm competition can be ruled out as the primary underlying cause of copulatory calling. More precisely, females produce coital vocalizations also when they mate during non-fertile periods, which is therefore primarily aimed at attracting as many males as possible and to create parental confusion rather than obtaining high quality sperm. Females have no interest in advertising their periods of fertility, given that males would pick up on these patterns, reducing paternal confusion and causing an increase in aggressive behavior towards her offspring from other males. Such hidden fertility has been coined concealed ovulation, and is part of extended female sexuality.

=== Alternative benefits ===
In addition to the incitement of parental confusion in order to avoid infanticide, female primates that exhibit promiscuous behavior also reap non-genetic material benefits. A female that uses vocalizations after copulating with her mate attracts other males, with whom she is also likely to engage in multiple acts of mating. As a consequence male mates provide non-genetic benefits, such as food, to the female they mated with. Such vocalization-facilitated promiscuity heightens the female's reproductive success. The strategy to mate with multiple partners in order to obtain material benefits can equally be observed in non-primates.

== In humans ==
Theories are more diverse in regard to women's sexual vocalizing. On one hand, researchers have noted some apparently communicative patterns in women's copulatory vocalizations that suggest some parallels with those of other primates, including an invitation to sperm competition, given that female sexual vocalizations, like those of other primates, serve as "copulation calls" noticeable to other men and exciting to them if overheard.

One study, for instance, has noted that female sexual vocalizations tend to become more intense as she approaches orgasm. At orgasm her vocalizations are usually discrete and are not random, appearing related to observed contractions of the superficial perivaginal striated muscles; these in turn probably correlate with each wave of erotic pleasure. The vocalization tends to become very rapid, with a regular rhythm that includes equal note lengths and intervals between notes, which male vocalization typically lacks. This is especially frequent when her orgasm occurs during penile–vaginal intercourse. By exciting her partner with her vocalizations and bringing about his orgasm at that point, she helps ensure that the seminal pool is available for her cervix to dip into as her vagina relaxes after her orgasm.

Copulatory vocalizations may also be a type of mate retention behaviour. One study found that women who perceived a high risk of infidelity in their relationship were more likely to utilize copulatory vocalizations in order to fake an orgasm, along with other mate-retention behaviours.

On the other hand, a recent study has indicated that most copulatory vocalizations in women do not accompany their own orgasm, but rather their partner's ejaculation. The study showed that the man typically finds the woman's vocalization arousing and highly exciting, and that the woman herself is aware of this. Most women in the study, furthermore, indicated that they vocalized during intercourse to make their man ejaculate more quickly, or to boost his enjoyment or self-esteem, or both. A correlation has been found between the frequency of vocalizations and sexual satisfaction for both men and women.

The reasons that women gave for wanting to force a quick ejaculation include the alleviation of the female's pain, fatigue, or even boredom, or simply to stay within some imposed time restriction for sexual activity. Reasons for wanting to boost the male self-esteem included reinforcing the pair bond that intercourse helps to strengthen, and thus reducing emotional and sexual infidelity and abandonment. The researchers note that all of these goals are apparently congruent with female copulatory vocalizations in non-human primates.

== See also ==
- Mating call
- Orgasm
- Fake orgasm
- Extended female sexuality
- Concealed ovulation
