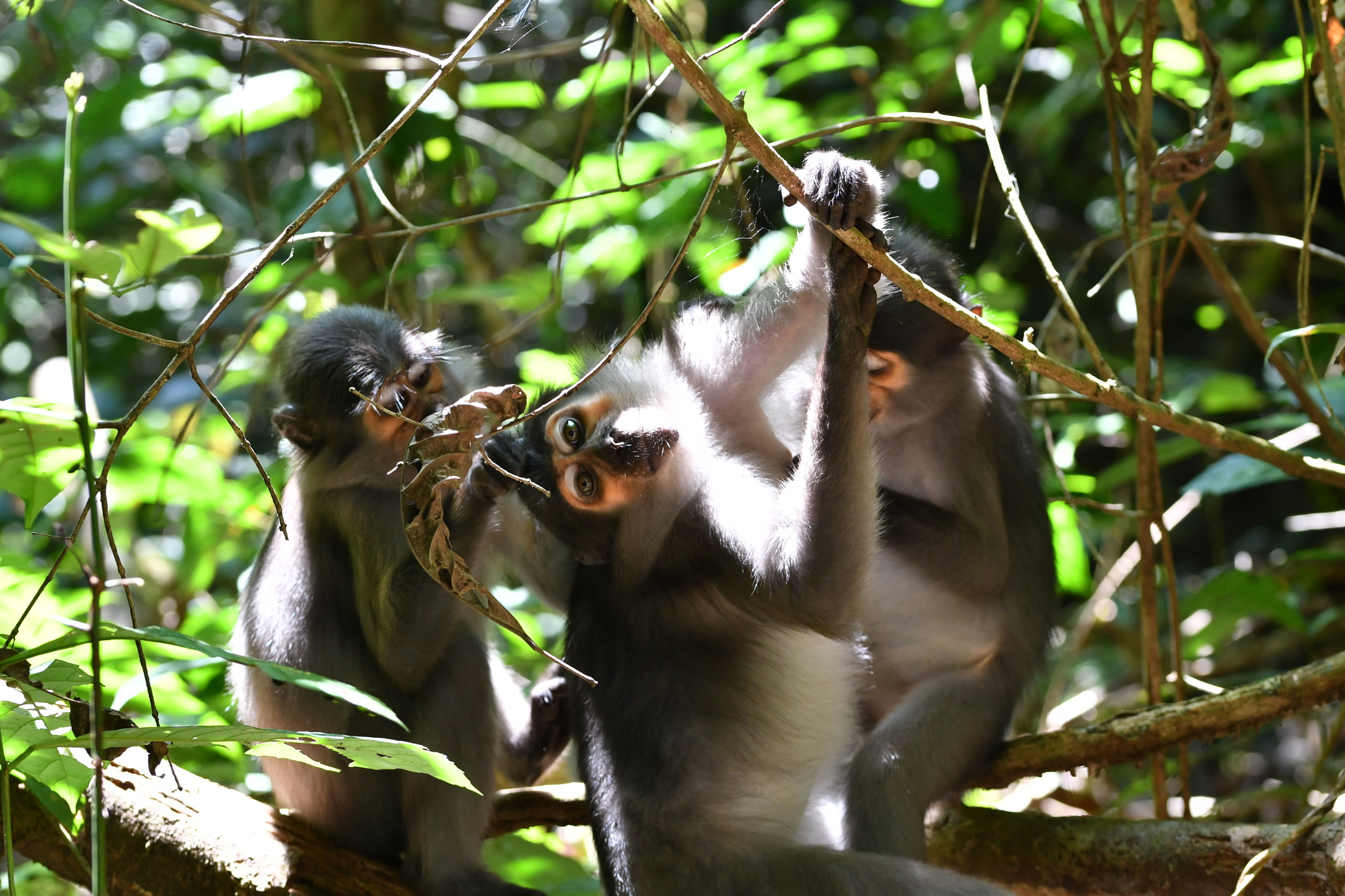

Conservation status
- Vulnerable (IUCN 3.1)

Scientific classification
- Kingdom: Animalia
- Phylum: Chordata
- Class: Mammalia
- Order: Primates
- Family: Cercopithecidae
- Genus: Cercocebus
- Species: C. atys

Binomial name
- Cercocebus atys (Audebert, 1797)
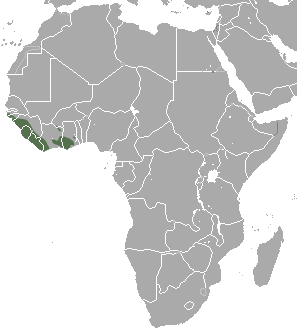
- Sooty Mangabey Range Map

= Sooty mangabey =

Species of mammal

The sooty mangabey (Cercocebus atys) is an Old World monkey found in forests from Senegal in a margin along the coast down to the Ivory Coast.

== Taxonomy ==
Until 2016, Cercocebus atys was considered a single species of mangabey, with two subspecies: Cercocebus atys atys (now Cercocebus atys) and Cercocebus atys lunulatus. After assessment by the International Union for Conservation of Nature (IUCN) in 2016, Cercocebus atys lunulatus was declared a separate species (Cercocebus lunulatus). Both Cercocebus atys and Cercocebus lunulatus were formerly considered subspecies of the widespread Cercocebus torquatus.

- Cercocebus atys atys, now Cercocebus atys, is commonly known as the sooty mangabey and is situated west of the Sassandra River in the Ivory Coast up to Senegal.
- Cercocebus atys lunulatus, now Cercocebus lunulatus, is commonly known as the white-crowned, white-naped, or white-collared mangabey (leading to confusion with the collared mangabey). This now distinct species is considered to have a geographic range east of the Sassandra River to the west of the Volta River in Ghana; Cercocebus lunulatus is also recorded as inhabiting forests in southwestern Burkina Faso and northeastern Ivory Coast. Cercocebus lunulatus is considered Endangered by the IUCN.

== Habitat and ecology ==
The sooty mangabey is native to tropical West Africa, being found in Guinea, Guinea-Bissau, Liberia, Senegal, Sierra Leone, and Ivory Coast. Sooty mangabeys inhabit both old growth and secondary forests as well as in flooded, dry, swamp, mangrove, and gallery forests. Farmland can also be inhabited or put to use by the sooty

== Diet ==
Sooty mangabeys are terrestrial omnivores, typically spending around 75% of their overall time on the ground (~85% of travel time and ~71% of foraging time). In their foraging behaviors, sooty mangabeys typically consume fruits (~20% of diet), invertebrates (~13% of diet), and nuts and seeds (>55% of diet). In acquiring nuts, sooty mangabeys have been observed scavenging the remains of coula and panda nuts cracked by chimpanzees and red river hogs, potentially using either the sound of cracking nuts or social networks to identify sites of remnants.

== Appearance ==
Sooty mangabeys are gray-colored primates with a lighter-colored chest and stomach. Their faces are typically grayish pink, with darker fur along the forehead and ears; given their diet of hard seeds and nuts, sooty mangabeys are observed to have strong molars. Sooty mangabeys also show sexual dimorphism; males typically weigh about 10–11 kg (22–24 lb), while females are typically smaller at about 5–6 kg (11–13 lb).

== Behavior ==
=== Social organization ===
Sooty mangabeys typically live and forage in large, multi-male, multi-female groups of 70–120 individuals. Sooty mangabeys form linear dominance hierarchies within sexes and form coalitions; within these hierarchies, higher-ranking females typically are found to spend less time foraging as opposed to feeding than their lower-ranking counterparts and were more centrally located within groups. Similarly, higher-ranking males were found to be more centrally located within the group, and be better fed and rested. And in captivity, higher-ranking males sired more offspring, indicating that higher male rank is generally predictive of greater reproductive success. Overall, however, females are found to be located in a more central spatial position within the group and better fed and rested than males, independent of ranking.

Dominance rankings are not static; turnover of the dominant, alpha male has been recorded. Furthermore, the dominance rank of children is not influenced by the dominance ranking of either parent, and juveniles typically challenge higher ranking adults starting around three or four years of age. Typically, males will outrank all of the females by age five or six.

=== Communication ===
Sooty mangabeys are typically predated upon by leopards, crowned eagles, chimpanzees, Gaboon vipers, and humans. As a result of these selective pressures, sooty mangabeys have evolved acoustically distinct alarm calls for different predator types. These calls are not vocalized specifically in favor of kin or cooperation partners and in fact are used by other monkey species to avoid potential predators.

Sooty mangabeys also produce other vocalizations within their varied repertoire for a wide variety of social interactions. Sooty mangabeys are recorded most frequently producing grunts (typically in the context of foraging, socially embracing, or, between males, for asserting dominance), twitters (typically produced by adult females during foraging and social interactions such as grooming), and screams (emitted during agonistic interactions, typically by juveniles and adult females). Other notable vocalizations include copulation calls mainly emitted by females during intercourse and "whoop gobbles"—low frequency, extended calls emitted by males at a high volume during the morning, with a nearby group, or with sightings or attacks of predators.

When approaching other females with infants, females will use grunts and twitters to signal benign intent. This often leads to unreciprocated grooming from the approaching female—mothers, upon receiving grooming, will allow for the grooming female to handle their infants.

=== Sexual and reproductive behavior ===
Female sooty mangabeys have sexual swellings that are maximally tumescent near ovulation and typically have a gestation length of ~160–170 days; while typically, higher ranking males would be able to identify estrous females and monopolize mating opportunities, it is suggested that dominant males cannot entirely control access to estrous females, perhaps because swellings allow females to precipitate paternity confusion through polygynandry. However, despite these potential counterstrategies against infanticide through paternity confusion, cases of infanticide have been recorded, usually shortly after a change in alpha males or with the introduction of new, immigrant males.

In captivity, recently deposed alpha males have been observed carrying their infants (likely for protection) in the presence of newly ascended alpha males, typically following aggression by the new alpha male towards the infant. In habituated sooty mangabeys, immigrant males new to the group have been found to attack infants, who would be defend by their mothers. In this context, resident adult males who had mated with the mother (and potentially fathered the infant) were found to defend the mother and infant from the attacking immigrant male.

Females have thus developed behavioral counter-strategies to protect against attacks and infanticide. Females were found to mate with resident males during previous mating seasons and remain in close proximity to these resident males after birth. In addition, females have been found to respond differently to the vocalizations of members of their own group (as opposed to non-group members), suggesting an ability to recognize infanticide threats from strangers.

=== Activity by day ===
Sooty mangabeys are diurnal animals that are mostly active during the day. Their morning starts with a rise an energy where the sooty mangabey will make its displays, travel, and sexually present itself. However, at this time, they have minimal social contact. The late morning and early afternoon will often restrict the movement of the sooty mangabey and promote more social interactions between them. During this time, grooming or play are prevalent. By the late afternoon, the sooty mangabey will engage in play or feeding behavior.

== Disease ==
Sooty mangabeys are naturally infected with a strain of Simian Immunodeficiency Virus (SIV), known as SIVsmm. Due to extensive human-mangabey contact in sub-Saharan Africa, SIVsmm has jumped from this species into humans on many occasions, resulting in HIV-2 virus. Because sooty mangabeys, as natural hosts of SIV, do not get sick from SIV, much research has been performed on the species for potential genetic resistance or immunological mechanisms. The HIV-1 strain by contrast came from the common chimpanzee strain of SIV.

Sooty mangabeys can also contract leprosy, caused by the bacterium Mycobacterium leprae. It is one of several species in which naturally acquired leprosy has been reported, the others being humans, the nine-banded armadillo, the common chimpanzee, and the crab-eating macaque; murine leprosy has also been reported in rats and mice, caused by Mycobacterium lepraemurium.

== Conservation status ==
The sooty mangabey is believed to be decreasing in numbers as its forest habitat is degraded, with trees being felled for firewood and timber and forest habitats used for agriculture. Furthermore, sooty mangabeys are hunted for meat in some parts of its range, often at rates far exceeding the rate at which Sooty mangabeys can reproductively sustain themselves; this increase in hunting, especially with improved technology and an influx of human populations (and thus hunters), has become an increasing threat to the conservation of sooty mangabeys. The International Union for Conservation of Nature has assessed the conservation status of sooty mangabeys as Vulnerable.
