= Extended female sexuality =

Females mating while infertile

Extended female sexuality is where the female of a species mates despite being infertile. In most species, the female only engages in copulation when she is fertile. However, extended sexuality has been documented in Old World primates, pair bonded birds and some insects (such as carrion beetles). Extended sexuality is most prominent in human females who exhibit no change in copulation rate across the ovarian cycle.

Although this behaviour incurs costs to females, such as energy and time, many researchers have proposed reasons for its existence. These hypotheses include the male assistance hypothesis, which proposes that females gain non-genetic benefits (such as food and shelter) in exchange for sexual access. A sub-hypothesis of this is Hrdy's, proposing extended female sexuality as an adaptive process aiming to creating paternity confusion in males. Alternative hypotheses, classified as 'male-driven', claim that extended female sexuality occurs due to male adaptations, resulting from an inability to detect fertility status in females or to dampen immune responses against sperm. Finally, Spuhler's hypothesis suggests that the behaviour may have arisen as an incidental effect of larger adrenal glands in humans.

The human menstrual cycle

== Occurrence ==
=== In non-humans ===
Although not found in all organisms, researchers have identified sexual intercourse patterns in certain animals that reflect extended female sexuality, such as in some old world primates, birds and insects. Extensive research has focused on analysing the musk shrew's rate of sexual behaviour. The only period that is associated with a drop in female receptivity to copulation is during mid to late pregnancy; yet, even at this time, occasional mating is reported. Therefore, researchers have concluded that this animal has similar sexual receptivity across infertile and fertile phases. Within primates, research has consistently found evidence of extended female sexuality in the rhesus monkey and chimpanzees. Both of these primates mate at all stages of the ovarian cycle, with only slight increases in sexual receptivity during fertile stages, and decreases during menstruation.

=== In humans ===
Human females are considered to exhibit the greatest degree of extended female sexuality, with receptivity to sexual intercourse remaining constant across fertile and infertile phases of the reproductive cycle, including during pregnancy, lactation, and in adolescence. In a study of 20,000 women from 13 countries, frequency of copulation was reportedly the same across all stages of the ovarian cycle. The only notable drop in sexual behaviour occurred during menstruation. Therefore, women largely showed the same level of sexual behaviour in the non-fertile phases of their ovarian cycles as in the fertile phases.

Researchers have investigated the effect of hormonal contraceptive use in women on the frequency of sexual intercourse. Many of these contraceptives mimic a pregnancy state in females by altering hormone levels. Therefore, women who use these contraceptives do not experience the fertile phases of their cycles. In a systematic review, it appeared that the frequency of sexual intercourse was unaffected by contraceptive use in the majority of women. Although artificially created, this adds to the literature documenting the existence of copulation in humans during non-fertile periods.

=== Impact of concealed ovulation ===
In order to encourage mating in non-conceptive periods and to encourage males to maintain their proximity, males must possess imperfect knowledge of the female's fertility status. This is achieved through concealed ovulation in most animals that exhibit extended female sexuality. A review of studies revealed that, in humans, females only exhibit subtle changes during estrus, making it difficult for males to assess fertility with precision. In the !Kung tribe, for instance, females lack any overt signals of fertility and are continuously receptive to sexual intercourse, encouraging males to remain and provide resources.

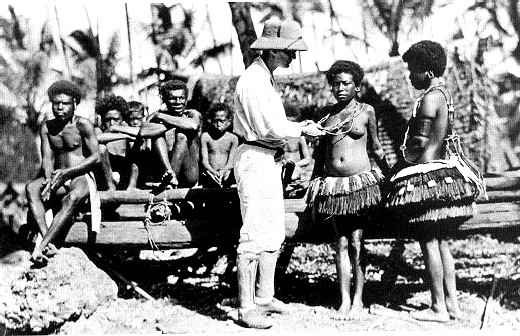
The Trobriand people with Bronisław Malinowski

== Explanations ==
=== Male assistance hypothesis ===
Mating outside the fertile window of their ovarian cycle may incur considerable costs for females, such as in time and energy usage. To counteract these costs, the male assistance hypothesis argues that females exhibit extended sexuality to obtain resources from males. These resources vary between species, but can include food, social alliance, and protection of the female and her offspring. For example, in the Trobriand tribe, men give women gifts in exchange for sexual access. From this hypothesis, three predictions can be made.

==== Male provision of non-genetic resources ====
Firstly, in species that demonstrate extended female sexuality, there should be evidence that the males provide non-genetic resources to females. This prediction is supported in a variety of animals, with reviews revealing that male assistance (such as food or protection), is provided to certain mammals and communally breeding birds in exchange for mating outside the conceptive period. For example, female blackbirds that solicit mating outside the fertile period have increased mate guarding from their pair-bonded partner. This increases protection against other sexually coercive males and ensures the provision of other material benefits. In a review investigating primates that exhibit extended female sexuality, it was noted that females engaging in extended sexuality benefited from increased offspring protection and paternal care from males.

==== Enhanced reproductive success ====
Secondly, in order to outweigh the aforementioned costs, mating during infertile phases should increase females' reproductive success by increasing the number of offspring produced. Current research has only investigated this factor indirectly, and it has predominantly been investigated in insects. For example, when male insects deliver material benefits in exchange for sexual access, the reproductive success of the females increases with the number of matings. The mating behaviour assessed was not limited to extended female sexuality. Hence, it only provides indirect support for the second prediction.

==== Shifting mate preferences and behaviour across the ovarian cycle ====
The final prediction of the male-assistance hypothesis has been extensively investigated. It predicts that females will exhibit differing mate preferences during fertile and non-fertile periods. Specifically, when fertile, the females will be sensitive to indicators of high genetic quality to increase the genetic quality of her offspring. Conversely, outside of the fertile period, females will show a preference for males who can provide resources for her and her offspring. In most species, males of higher genetic quality offer fewer non-genetic resources (such as shelter and food) than those of lower quality, so females are likely to choose different males at each stage.

Evidence for this prediction has been found in many different species. In hens, those near peak fertility show a preference for socially dominant roosters with large combs. Larger combs have been reliably associated with health and offspring survival so reliably indicate the genetic quality of the rooster. In the non-fertile phases, hens mate more indiscriminately with less regard for the larger comb size. A similar pattern emerges in humans. A review of relevant studies on female preferences across the ovarian cycle reveals that women show a greater preference for masculine traits in fertile phases, especially for short term mating intention. This finding occurs across a variety of traits, such as masculine voices, body and facial features, scent, and behavioural displays. The level of masculinity acts as an indicator of genetic quality through its association with high testosterone. Similarly, women show a preference for higher levels of symmetry, which is thought to indicate underlying developmental stability. However, during infertile phases, women prefer males with lower masculinity and symmetry, as they tend to be more willing to offer material benefits.

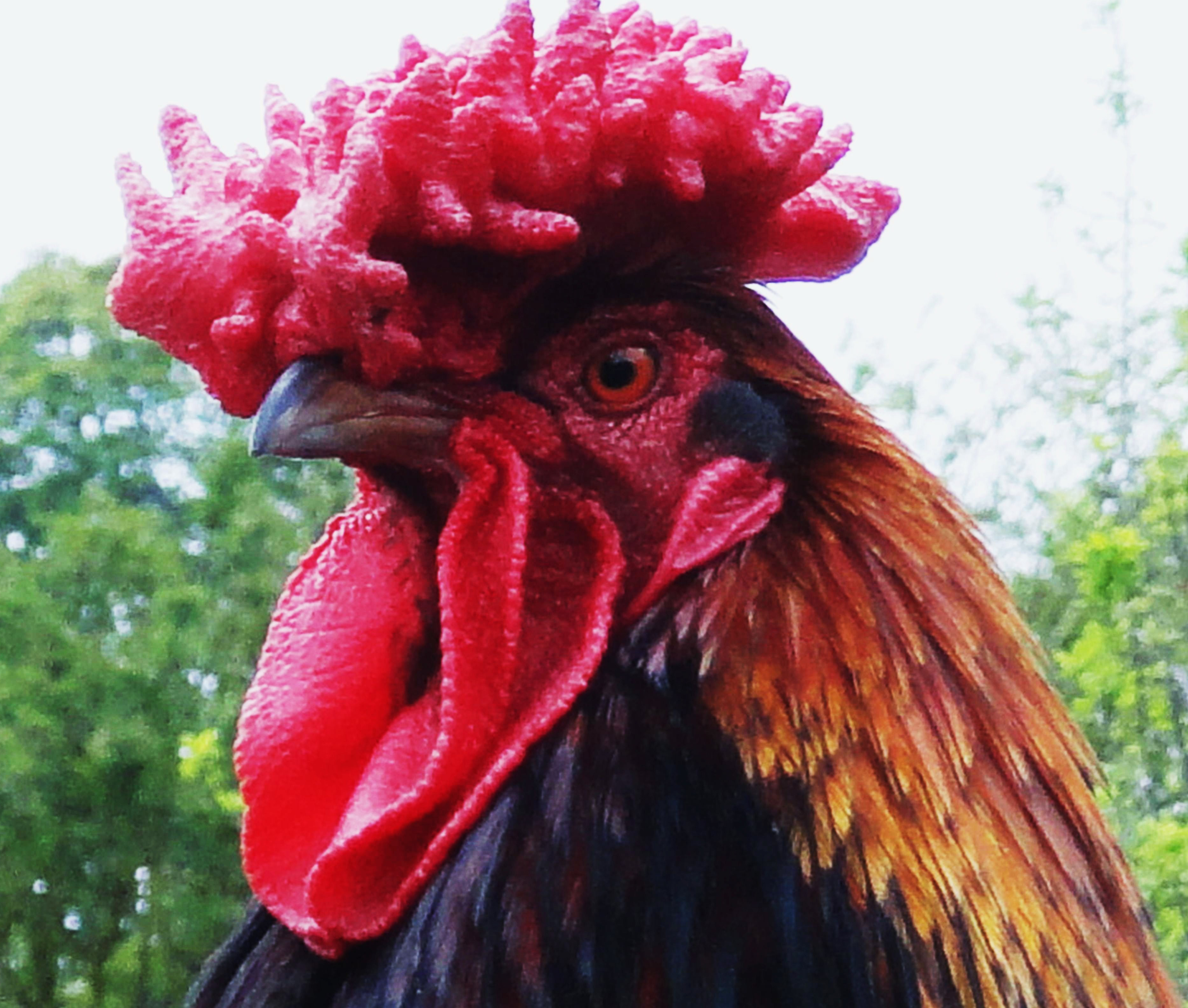
A rooster with a comb

In addition to impacting mating preferences, females have been found to exhibit differing mating behaviour at different cycle stages. An analysis of 121 studies with female birds showed that most mate outside their pair bond at a higher rate when fertile, especially when the primary partner possesses indicators of low quality genes. During infertile phases, birds showed reductions in this behaviour, suggesting that the function of extended female sexuality is not to increase the genetic quality of offspring. In humans, females show increased motivation for mating with other males at mid-cycle without an accompanying increase in copulation with their long-term partner, especially if the partner was less physically attractive.

=== Hrdy's hypothesis ===
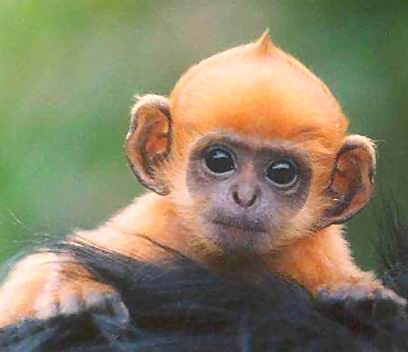
An infant Old World monkey

Hrdy's hypothesis is an extension of the male assistance hypothesis, in that both hypotheses argue that women have evolved this adaptation to gain some tangible benefit from males. According to Hrdy's hypothesis, extended female sexuality is an adaptive process with an aim of creating paternity confusion in their male counterparts. Paternity confusion refers to the male being unsure as to whether offspring are genetically his own. If the female mates with different males (at all points of her ovarian cycle) whilst concealing fertility, then the males will inevitably have paternity confusion.

Paternity confusion is proposed to be an adaptive function for preventing infanticide. Thus, if the female can successfully create paternity confusion, males will be less likely to kill her offspring, as the lack of paternity certainty means that they run the risk of killing their own genetic offspring. Additionally, the males, in turn, are likely to protect the same female's offspring from infanticide that may be committed by other adults within the species. Once again, this is because they are uncertain about paternity, and aim to protect infants that are genetically their own.

==== Paternity confusion in primates ====
Researchers have analysed the behaviour of chimpanzees, with particular reference to copulation calling. Copulation calling is a type of vocalisation used to attract mates. The calls are vocalised either before, during, or after sexual intercourse. Copulation calling, in line with Hrdy's hypothesis, may then be one way to ensure that the female can mate with as many different males as possible, causing paternity confusion. Indeed, the authors found that the probability of copulatory calling in female chimpanzees was not modulated by the ovarian phase of the female caller, thereby aiding paternity confusion. This paternity confusion ultimately ensures that the woman has access to the resources of a number of different males. These resources can be utilised by her, as well as by her offspring.

Criticism of Hrdy's hypothesis emerges from evidence which suggests that male primates can discriminate between their own offspring and the offspring of others. In one study, researchers analysed the DNA of 75 juvenile baboons to conclude who fathered them. They found that males selectively cared for their own offspring, particularly when their offspring became involved in aggressive confrontations which posed the possibility of injuries or a threat to their social standing. Evidently, if males can discriminate between their own offspring and the offspring of others, then there is no purpose in the female attempting to create paternity confusion during the pregnancy stage. This would be counter-intuitive, as, once the offspring is born, the males will know whether the offspring is, or is not, their own. Future research will need to be conducted in this vein to investigate whether males in other species show the ability to discriminate between their own offspring and the offspring of others before coming to any decisive conclusions.

==== Concealed estrus as a function of paternity confusion in primates ====
Research is fairly consistent in the finding that species with concealed estrus mate at all stages of their ovarian cycle. For instance, mating activity in assamese macaques (Macaca assamensis) has been investigated. The researchers analysed the levels of progesterone in the monkeys, in order to establish the ovarian stage of the female, as progesterone peaks following the fertile window. They found that the females concealed estrus and were sexually receptive during the entire mating season. Concealed estrus and sexual receptivity (at all times of the ovarian cycle) aids paternity confusion. This is because the males are unsure of who mated with the female during her fertile period, and so do not know the identity of the father.

Hrdy's hypothesis has been criticised, however, on the basis that some female primates show both extended female sexuality and sexual swellings. In terms of Hrdy's hypothesis, these two concepts are incompatible. Sexual swellings appear only during the most fertile phase of the female's ovarian cycle, with the purpose of advertising fertility. In sharp contrast, according to Hrdy, extended sexuality is adapted to conceal fertility and ensure mating across all stages of the ovarian cycle, to aid paternity confusion.

=== Male-driven hypotheses ===
One of the alternative explanations is that extended female sexuality is 'male-driven'. This hypothesis is theoretically based on male uncertainty regarding the fertility status of females. Although some physiological changes occur during the fertile period that may act as reliable indicators (e.g. the concentration of oestrogen can change female scent), most species have not evolved signals advertising fertility (e.g. sexual swellings). Therefore, males will be unable to detect fertility with any precision. As a result, extended female sexuality is proposed as a male sexually selected trait. Males will pursue sexual access throughout the entirety of the ovarian cycle to increase their chances of impregnating the female. According to this hypothesis, females lack any benefit from this activity due to their inability to conceive, yet will be coerced by males to engage in sexual intercourse.

==== The training hypothesis ====
Human sperm under a microscope

Another hypothesis claiming that extended female sexuality has evolved to benefit males' interests is the 'training hypothesis'. It has been shown that women's immune systems attack foreign antigens found in sperm. This may reduce the likelihood of conception and so reduce the reproductive success for the males. However, prior exposure to sperm antigens can dampen the immune response to increase the chances of successful conception and implantation. Therefore, males may have evolved to train and 'condition' women's immune systems by copulating with females during infertile periods, in order to reduce the likelihood of her immune system reacting against the sperm's antigens from lack of exposure. Indeed, research has identified findings consistent with this hypothesis. Couples who had used condoms before trying to conceive were more likely to suffer complications, such as pre-eclampsia, during pregnancy as a result of the woman's immune system having no prior exposure to the antigens in the sperm. In non-humans, an increased frequency of copulation in crickets has been shown to reduce the female's immune response to sperm.

This hypothesis has received much criticism. For example, as all mammals experience the same immune system responses to sperm antigens, this hypothesis predicts that all mammals should exhibit extended female sexuality. However, only few species of mammals exhibit sexual behaviour outside the conceptive period. On the other hand, eclampsia is virtually unique to humans and thus the Training Hypothesis may only be relevant to extended female sexuality in humans.

=== Spuhler's hypothesis ===
Spuhler's hypothesis is a stand-alone hypothesis of extended female sexuality. Spuhler suggests that extended female sexuality has evolved as a by-product of an adaptation in females that increases the levels of adrenal hormones. He proposed that secretion of higher levels of adrenal hormones were initially selected in women in order to increase endurance for walking or running. This hypothesis suggests that the larger adrenal glands may have contributed to the development of extended female sexuality as they are also the main source of 'libido hormones', which increase the female's sexual drive. Thus, extended sexuality is little to do with sexual behavior, or evolutionary advantage, but rather it is just a by-product of hormones. However, this hypothesis cannot account for extended female sexuality in invertebrates, which lack adrenal systems. Additionally Spuhler highlighted the existence of larger thyroid and adrenal glands in humans compared to other primates. However, no empirical evidence has established the link between hormones and endurance walking as an adaptation and extended female sexuality as a natural incidental effect. As there are costs to extended sexuality, it can be argued that selection would serve the dissociation of extended sexuality from the mechanism that affects endurance walking.

== See also ==
- Alternative mating strategy
- Animal sexual behaviour
- Human female sexuality
- Human mating strategies
- Strategic pluralism
- Human sexual activity
- Human sexuality
- Major histocompatibility complex and sexual selection
- Mating system
- Ovulatory shift hypothesis
- Reproduction
