= Ovulatory shift hypothesis =

Hypothesis of female mating behavior

The ovulatory shift hypothesis asserts that human women experience evolutionarily adaptive changes in subconscious thoughts and behaviors related to mating during different parts of the ovulatory cycle. It suggests that what women want, in terms of men, changes throughout the menstrual cycle. Two meta-analyses published in 2014 reached opposing conclusions on whether the existing evidence was robust enough to support the prediction that women's mate preferences change across the cycle. Questions have been raised about the validity of the supporting meta-analysis and some of its findings have been retracted. A newer 2018 review does not show women changing the type of men they desire at different times in their fertility cycle. This null finding is supported by a wide range of methodologically rigorous, well-powered experiments.

== Overview ==
The theory proposes that human women's behavior may change during the most fertile time in their ovulatory cycle. At high fertility, the theory holds that women may become more physically active and avoid male relatives.

The hypothesis separately proposes that hormonal changes across the cycle cause women, when they are most likely to get pregnant, to be more attracted to traits in potential short-term male sexual partners that indicate high genetic quality, leading to greater reproductive success. It has been proposed that genetic traits like compatible major histocompatibility complex gene profiles are considered more attractive. Newer studies do not support female changes in desired reproductive partners when more fertile.

=== Estrus in humans ===
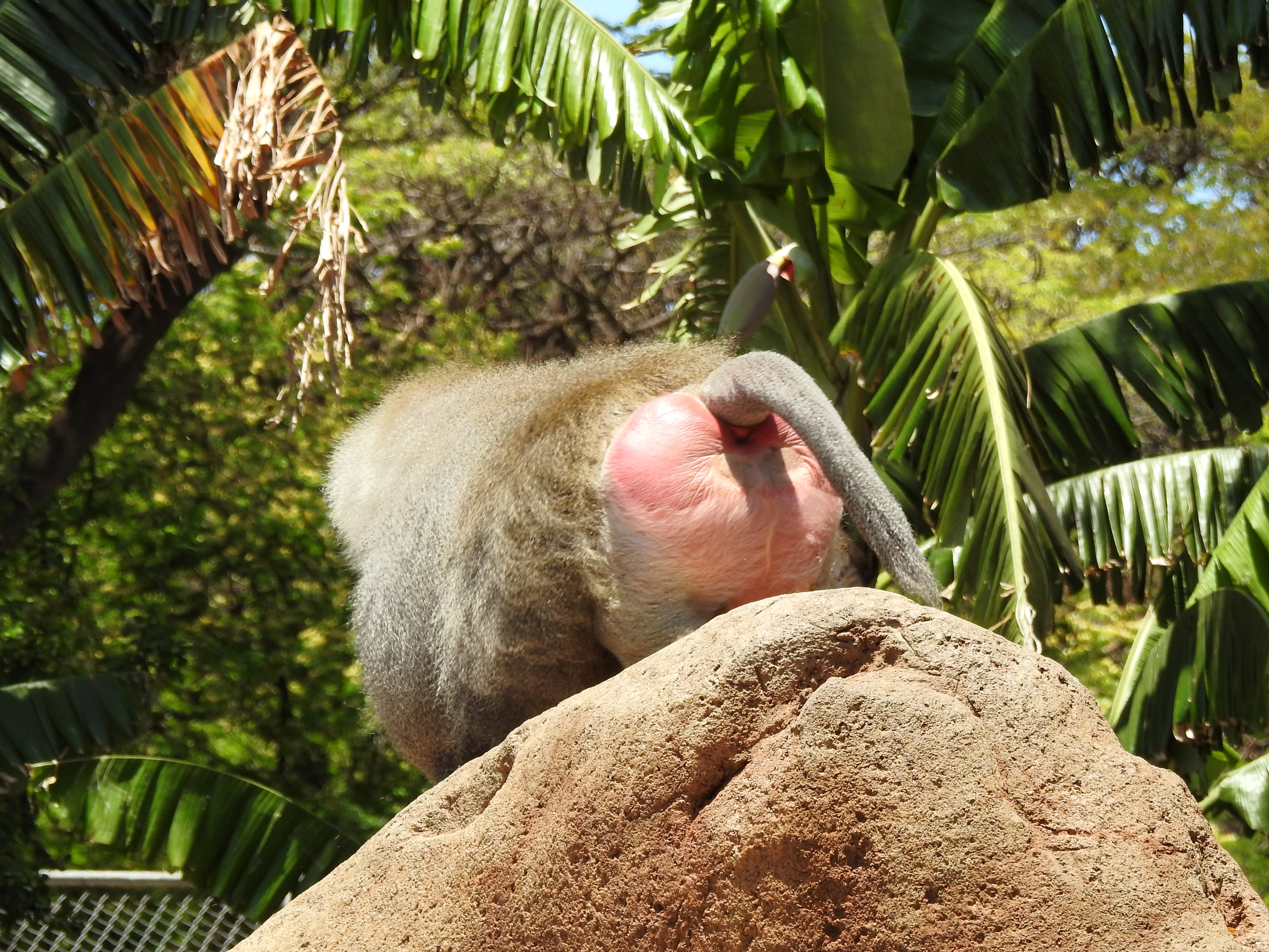
Female baboons and many other primates experience sexual swellings that advertise their fertility during estrus. Humans do not display any such obvious physical signals of fertility, but may still experience a subtle estrus-like state.

Most female mammals experience reproductive fertility cycles. They typically consist of a long period of low fertility, and a brief period of high fertility just prior to and including ovulation. In humans, this is called the ovulatory cycle, or menstrual cycle. The period of high fertility is also called the fertile window, and is the only time during the cycle when sex can result in conception.

Females of most mammalian species display hormonally-induced physical and behavioral signals of their fertility during the fertile window, such as sexual swellings and increased motivation to mate. Some species will not—or cannot—engage in sex at all outside of this window. This phase of sexual receptivity and proceptivity, estrus, is often referred to as being "in heat".

Human females, however, engage in sex throughout their ovulatory cycles, and even beyond their reproductive years. Additionally, they do not show obvious physical signals of high fertility. This has led many researchers to conclude that humans lost their estrus through evolution. It has been hypothesized that this could be due to the adaptive benefits of concealed ovulation and extended sexuality.

However, research has shown that human females may in fact experience subtle but distinct physiological, behavioral, and cognitive changes during the high-fertility phase of their ovulatory cycle, and that both men and other women can detect signals that indicate high-fertility in a woman, which may indicate that humans have retained an estrus-like state.

=== Evolution of ovulatory cycle shifts ===
Estrus evolved to facilitate reproduction and maximize reproductive success, or the success of passing on one's genes by producing offspring that are most likely to survive and reproduce themselves. The ovulatory shift hypothesis proposes that motivation and desire to mate should increase during the fertile window, and that females should seek and attract the best possible mate at their highest fertility. An ideal mate could have many qualities: resources to care for offspring, the physical ability and social status to protect a mate and offspring, a compatible personality for a long-term pair bond, etc. Evolutionary theory and sexual selection theory suggest that an organism's top priority should be to maximize survival and reproductive success. Thus, the ovulatory shift hypothesis proposes that women possess a dual sexuality, where during the fertile window, a woman should prioritize attracting and choosing a mate with the best genetic quality, or "good genes", since this is the only time she can become pregnant and pass on heritable genetic qualities to her offspring. However, at low-fertility, a woman should prioritize a mate with "good parenting" traits, such as willingness and ability to invest in parenting, resources to devote to offspring, and compatibility for a long-term partnership. These differing traits are sometimes referred to as the "sexy cad" vs. the "good dad".

It has also been hypothesized that high-fertility preferences should be strongest when evaluating a short-term sexual partner, but low-fertility preferences should be strongest when evaluating a long-term relationship partner. A woman can gain the benefits of good genes through only a single sexual encounter, and good dad traits are only relevant for a long-term pair bond.

Some researchers have suggested that over evolutionary time, women may have maximized reproductive success by seeking good genes from an extra-pair copulation—cheating on their partner—at high fertility, while also maintaining a long-term pair bond with a partner who provides parenting resources for the offspring, sometimes called the dual strategy hypothesis. Of course, an optimal partner is one with both sexy cad and good dad traits, but such a man is statistically unlikely to be common. Thus, natural selection may have designed ancestral women to be opportunistic. If successful, a woman could gain the benefits of both high-quality genetics and high-quality parenting to give her offspring the best chance of survival. However, natural selection would not have favored men who desire to provide for offspring that do not share their genes, so this would have been a risky strategy.

=== Mechanisms ===
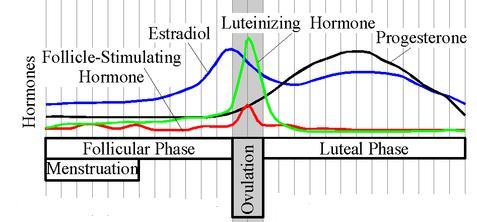
Hormonal changes across the ovulatory cycle. Researchers hypothesize that changes in estradiol (blue) and progesterone (black) primarily drive changes in mating-related thoughts and behaviors.

Ovulatory cycle shifts are hypothesized to be regulated by sex hormones, primarily estradiol and progesterone, which become elevated at different times across the cycle. In particular, high levels of estradiol and low levels of progesterone, which peak at high fertility just prior to ovulation, have been shown to be correlated with several mating-related psychological changes. However, some studies have only found correlations with changes in estradiol. It is well-established that estradiol can act in the brain to produce other psychological and behavioral changes, and animal studies tend to show a link between sexual behavior and estrogen concentrations. Other hormones such as testosterone, follicle-stimulating hormone (FSH), luteinizing hormone (LH), and prolactin have been studied as possible correlates, but most have produced little to no effect.

== Changes in cognition and behavior across the ovulatory cycle ==
Numerous studies have demonstrated ovulatory cycle shifts in women's mating-related motivations, preferences, thoughts, and behaviors.

=== Sexual desire ===
Some of the earliest studies on human ovulatory shifts explored whether women engage in more instances of sexual activity during high fertility, as this could indicate a human estrus-like state. While some studies have found increases in frequency of sexual activity at high fertility, larger studies have concluded that there is generally no difference in frequency of sexual activity across the ovulatory cycle, possibly due to the multitude of factors that affect the ability to engage in sex (e.g., access to a partner, partner's desire, time for engaging, etc.).

Researchers have subsequently explored whether sexual desire, rather than frequency of sexual activity, changes across the ovulatory cycle, as this would not be affected by practical barriers to engaging in sex. Several studies in this area have shown that women's sexual desire and masturbation behaviors do increase during the fertile window, although results have been mixed and depend on the type of sexual desire measured. For example, desire for uncommitted sex does not appear to track fertility.

==== Relationship satisfaction ====
While early studies claimed that fertile-phase women might be more attracted to, flirt more, and initiate sex more often with men who are not their partner, newer studies do not support the hypothesis that females change who they consider desirable reproductive partners when more fertile.

Women in relationships were found in one, unreplicated study to be more assertive and independent during the fertile phase.

=== Attraction and mate preferences ===
The ovulatory shift hypothesis proposes that women at high fertility should be most attracted to short-term sexual partners with physical and behavioral features that likely signal genetic fitness, or good genes. But the research reported above failed to support this hypothesis

==== Symmetry ====
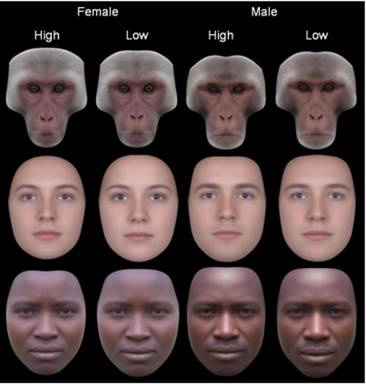
Female humans and other primates find faces with high levels of symmetry and masculinity more attractive, especially at high fertility.

Having symmetrical features may indicate that an individual possesses high-quality genes related to health, and that they developed in a stable environment with little disease or trauma. Studies have found that women rate faces of more symmetrical men as more attractive during high fertility, especially when evaluating them as short-term partners. It has also been demonstrated that women at high fertility are more attracted to the body odors of men with more facial and bodily symmetry. Although many studies and one meta-analysis have shown that fertility-moderated shifts in attraction to facial and bodily symmetry occur robustly, other reviews have concluded that the effect is small or non-existent.

==== Masculinity ====
In many species, more masculine and dominant males experience greater reproductive success. Masculine traits are produced during puberty by increasing amounts of testosterone. Testosterone is a known immunosuppressant, thus traits that reflect high levels of testosterone may indicate that a man possesses high-quality genes which allowed him to develop masculine features without experiencing any deleterious effects of high testosterone levels. Masculine traits include facial features like a strong jawline, bodily features like height, muscularity, and body hair, and vocal features like a deeper voice. While many studies have shown that women tend to be attracted to more masculine characteristics at high fertility, results have been mixed, and two meta-analyses have concluded that the effect is not robust.

==== Creativity ====
Charles Darwin first proposed that music, lacking a functional evolutionary explanation by natural selection, may be an instrument of sexual selection, just like a male peacock's extravagant feathers, which serve to attract a female. Similarly, humans may use artistic expressions as a display of good genetic qualities like creativity and intelligence.

==== Compatible genes ====
The major histocompatibility complex (MHC) is a suite of genes responsible for adaptive immune response and histocompatibility in an organism's cells. In animals, including mammals and other primates, MHC has been shown to play a role in MHC sexual selection, where organisms mate selectively with individuals who possess MHC alleles that are more dissimilar from their own. MHC has been shown to be responsible for changing the pheromone compositions of mice, causing mice with dissimilar MHC genes to have more attractive body odors. It has been hypothesized that this is a mechanism for creating genetic diversity, avoiding inbreeding, and creating offspring that are more resistant to pathogens. Some studies have shown that humans tend to form long-term partnerships with individuals who have more dissimilar MHC, and find the scent of MHC-dissimilar individuals more attractive, especially at high fertility. However, other studies have found little or no effect of MHC on mate preferences, and some have even shown a reverse effect, that people prefer partners with more similar MHC to their own. Several reviews and one meta-analysis on the human and primate literature regarding MHC have concluded that the effects of MHC similarity on attraction are not robust, but that humans are reliably attracted to individuals with more heterozygous, or diverse, MHC genotypes, regardless of whether they are similar to their own.

=== Clothing and grooming ===
The ovulatory shift hypothesis proposes that women's behavior during the fertile phase should also reflect evolutionary adaptations for reproductive success. Fertile-phase women also spend more time on their appearance and tend to wear accessories like jewelry, makeup, or hairstyles that are perceived as trying to look more attractive. Additionally, several studies have demonstrated that women tend to purchase more products related to enhancing their appearance, attractive clothing, shoes, or accessories, during the fertile window.

=== Activity and food consumption ===
One of the earliest studies on ovulatory shifts found that female lab rats tend to run on their exercise wheels more during their fertile window. Subsequent research showed that a variety of species experience an increase in the frequency of spontaneous activity and motor behavior during estrus. Some studies on humans have shown a similar pattern: women walk more steps, as counted by a pedometer, during the high-fertility phase of their cycle. However, other research has found no difference in locomotion patterns across the ovulatory cycle, and many studies on activity across the cycle have small sample sizes and substantially differing methodologies, making it difficult to draw definitive conclusions. Despite a possible increase in activity, many studies have found that women consume fewer calories during their fertile phase. Some researchers have suggested that these changes in activity and food consumption may indicate that during estrus, women are motivated to focus more of their energy on mating-related behaviors like going out to meet new potential mates, instead of survival-related behaviors like seeking food.

=== Competitiveness with other women ===
Parental investment theory posits the idea that natural selection designed each sex to have different mating strategies based on how much investment the sex is required to devote to offspring for their survival. The sex that invests more in offspring should be more intersexually selective, or picky when choosing a sexual partner, because they have more time and resources to lose if they make a poor choice. The other sex should be more intrasexually competitive, or competitive with members of their same sex, in order to access and attract the more selective sex. In humans, as in all mammals, females are the sex that invests more in parenting, simply through the lengthy and taxing process of pregnancy and lactation, whereas males need only to contribute one act of sexual intercourse to pass on their genes. Thus, females are expected to be the more selective sex, and males are expected to be more competitive. However, unlike many species where males do not contribute to parenting at all, humans have highly dependent offspring, and a complex social structure that allows males to make significant and important investments in parenting effort. According to parental investment theory, this indicates that natural selection may have designed women to be somewhat competitive with other women for access to the best mates and potential fathers for their offspring.

Some studies have indicated that women engage in more competitive behaviors with other women when they are at high fertility. During the fertile window, women not using hormonal contraceptives self-report increased feelings of intrasexual competitiveness, describe other women as less attractive, and use more dehumanizing terms when talking about women, but not men. Women's choices to purchase more attractive or revealing clothing at high fertility are also increased when they are first shown a photograph of an attractive woman, but not photographs of men or unattractive women, suggesting clothing may not be chosen to attract men, but rather as a competitive display for other women. Additionally, some studies have used economic games to show that women are less likely to share resources or engage in cooperative bargaining with other women during the fertile window. Some researchers have noted that the reason why women should be more competitive during the fertile window is unclear.

== Ovulatory cycle shifts ==
Hassleton and Gildersleeve (2011) wrote that both men and women can subconsciously detect cues to women's fertility that change across the ovulatory cycle. Some researchers have suggested that natural selection designed women to signal their fertility in order to attract a mate. Other researchers have proposed that women evolved to have concealed ovulation but they still "leak" subtle cues of their fertility, and men have evolved to detect these cues.

=== Body odor ===
During estrus, many species produce pheromones, or body odors that indicate to potential mates that one is in the fertile phase. While no specific human pheromones have been identified, humans may exhibit similar scent changes at high fertility. Body odors of high-fertility women not using hormonal contraceptives are rated in some studies as more attractive by both men and women. Vaginal odors from high-fertility women are also rated as more attractive than odors from the same women at low-fertility. Some studies have shown that men exposed to high-fertility body odors of women exhibit increases in testosterone.

=== Physical attractiveness ===
Studies using facial photographs found that both men and women rate physical features of women at high fertility more attractive than when they are at low fertility and that facial attractiveness increases in fertile phase women. It has been hypothesized that this shift may be due to subtle changes in soft tissue symmetry that increase during high-fertility.

=== Vocal pitch ===
Studies have found that fertile phase women speak with a slightly higher vocal pitch. One study reported that recordings of women's voices in the fertile phase are rated, by both men and women, as more attractive than recordings by the same women during low fertility. However, these effect sizes are relatively small compared to other cues of ovulation.

=== Partner jealousy ===
Several studies have found that men in a relationship tend to be more protective and possessive of their partner when she is at peak fertility, as well as more jealous of any advances their partner might make on other men. One study found that after interacting with their partner during the fertile phase, men shown a photograph of an attractive man exhibit increased testosterone, which may be a competitive response.

== Effects of hormonal contraception ==
Studies have reported that hormonal contraceptives weaken or eliminate cycle shifts entirely. It has been proposed that the synthetic hormones present in hormonal contraception that suppress ovulation also suppress the subsequent cognitive and behavioral changes found in naturally-cycling women. Other studies have stated that changes in synthetic hormones produce cycle shifts similar to effects produced by the real hormonal changes in naturally-cycling women.

== Alternative hypotheses ==
=== Within-cycle vs. between-cycle shifts ===
While the ovulatory shift hypothesis proposes that adaptive changes in mating-related cognition and behavior occur within each ovulatory cycle, some researchers have posited a between-cycle shift theory. Many women experience regular anovulatory cycles, or non-fertile cycles where ovulation does not occur, therefore hormonal changes between ovulatory cycles may be a more reliable indicator of true fertility, as higher levels of estradiol are more likely to produce a fertile ovulatory cycle. Thus, some researchers have proposed that hormonal changes between cycles, primarily in elevated estradiol levels, are responsible for changes in mating-related cognition and behavior. Within-cycle shifts may be simply a byproduct of between-cycle shifts caused by elevated estradiol.

== Meta-analyses and reviews ==
One meta-analysis and a review of the literature claimed support for the ovulatory shift hypothesis that women experience changes in attraction preferences at high fertility, although the authors had to retract some of their conclusions However, another meta-analysis and subsequent commentary concluded that the effect is not actually significant and may be a result of some studies using imprecise measurements of when women are in the fertile window, as well as publication bias. A review subsequently published also does not show women changing the type of men they desire at different times in their fertility cycle. Another study found no correlation between current fertility status and sociosexual attitudes and desires. On the basis of these current, rigorous studies, the ovulatory shift hypothesis has little empirical support.

== See also ==
- Body odour and sexual attraction
- Concealed ovulation
- Cuckoldry
- Estrous cycle
- Evolutionary psychology
- Extended female sexuality
- Extra-pair copulation
- Major histocompatibility complex and sexual selection
- Menstrual cycle
- Reproductive success
- Sexual attraction
- Sexual selection
- Sexy son hypothesis
