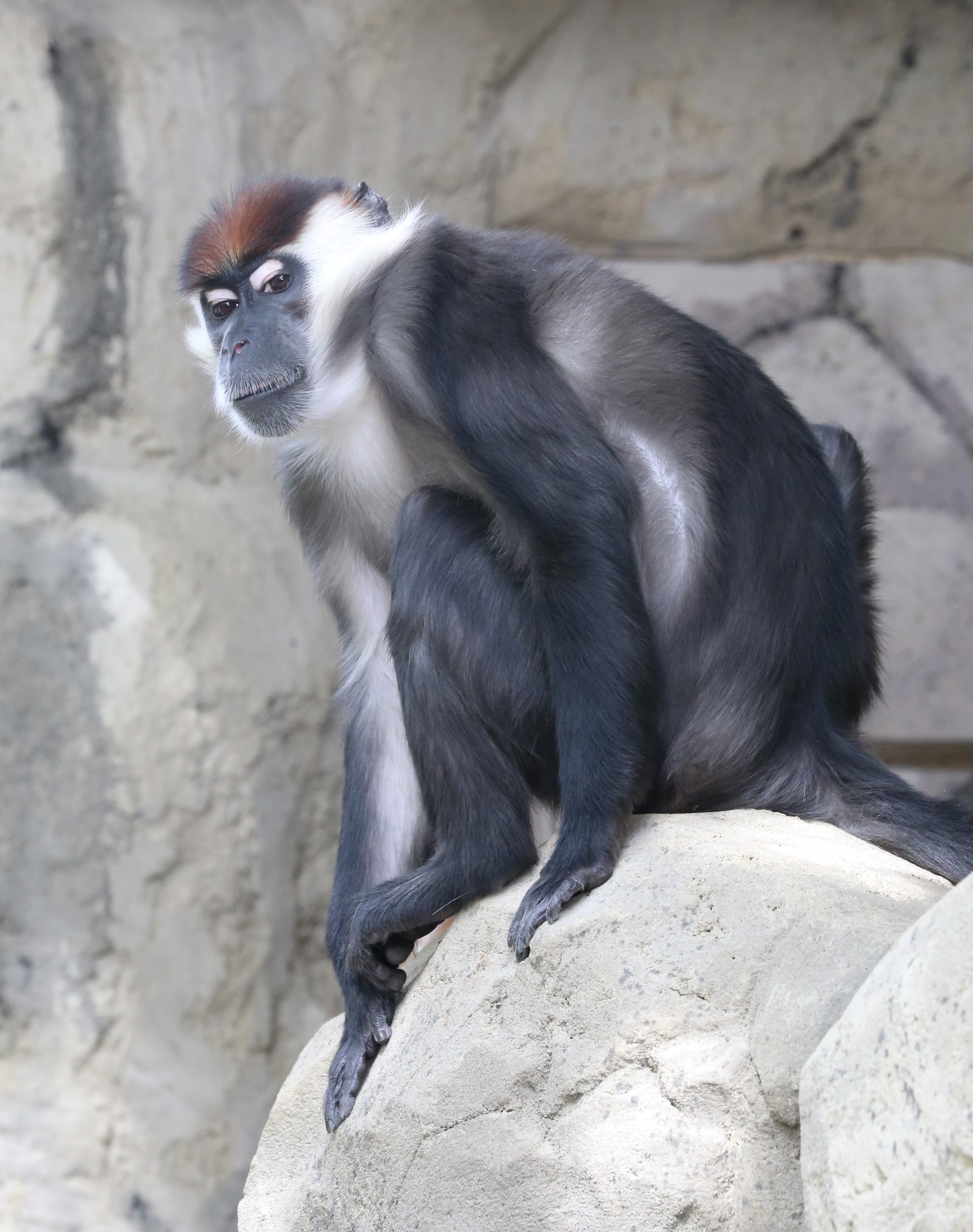
- Adult male at Hellabrunn Zoo
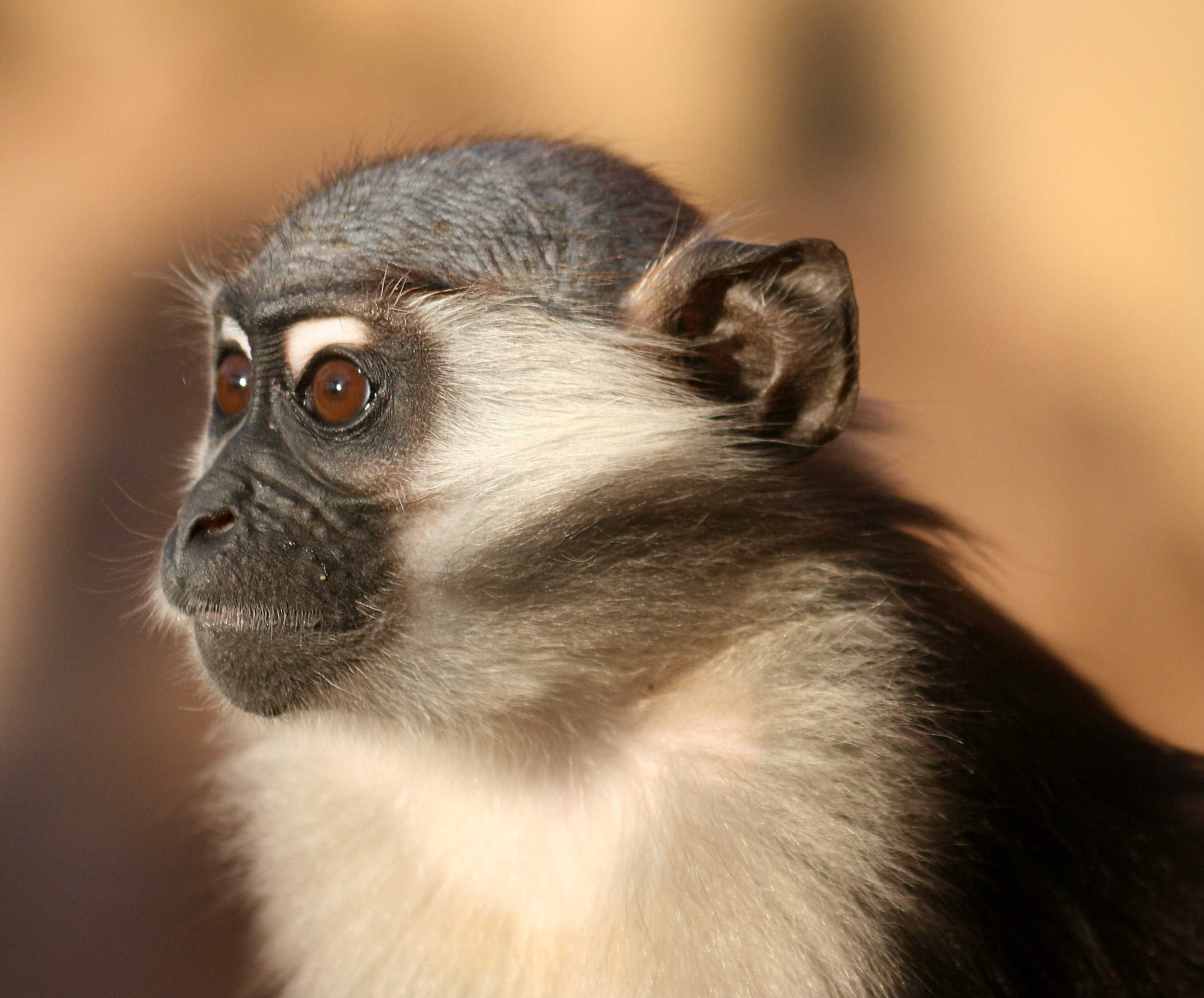
- Juvenile at Colchester Zoo

Conservation status
- Endangered (IUCN 3.1)

Scientific classification
- Kingdom: Animalia
- Phylum: Chordata
- Class: Mammalia
- Order: Primates
- Family: Cercopithecidae
- Genus: Cercocebus
- Species: C. torquatus

Binomial name
- Cercocebus torquatus (Kerr, 1792)
- Geographic range

= Collared mangabey =

Species of Old World monkey

The collared mangabey (Cercocebus torquatus), also called red-capped mangabey and white-collared mangabey, is a species of primate in the family Cercopithecidae of Old World monkeys. It formerly included the sooty mangabey as a subspecies. As presently defined, the collared mangabey is monotypic.

== Description ==
The collared mangabey has grey fur covering its body, but its common names refer to the colours on its head and neck. Its prominent chestnut-red cap gives it the name red-capped, and its white collar gives it the names collared and white-collared. Its ears are black and it has striking white eyelids, which is why some refer to it as the "four-eyed monkey". It has a dark grey tail that exceeds the length of the body and is often held with the white tip over its head. It has long molars and very large incisors. The average body mass for captive individuals ranges from 9 to 10 kg (20 to 22 lb) for males and 7.5 to 8.6 kg (17 to 19 lb) for females. Head-body length is 47–67 cm (19–26 in) in males and 45–60 cm (18–24 in) in females.

== Distribution and habitat ==
The collared mangabey is found in coastal, swamp, mangrove, and valley forests, from western Nigeria, east and south into Cameroon, and throughout Equatorial Guinea, and Gabon, and on the Gabon-Congo border by the Atlantic shore.

== Behavior and ecology ==
An adult female extends an arm through the cage mesh toward an experimenter who holds a raisin in her hands.

The collared mangabey lives in large groups of 10 to 35 individuals including several males. Vocal communication in the form of cackles and barks are used to keep the group in contact and signal their position to other groups. It has a diet of fruits and seeds, but also eats leaves, foliage, flowers, invertebrates, mushrooms, dung, and gum. The collared mangabey has no defined breeding season, it reaches sexual maturity at five to seven years, and has an average gestation period of 170 days.

== Threats ==
In 2006, it was estimated that annually about 3,000 collared mangabeys are hunted in the Cross-Sanaga-Bioko coastal forests for the bushmeat trade.

== Conservation ==
The collared mangabey is listed as endangered on the IUCN Red List due to habitat loss and hunting for bushmeat. It is also listed on Appendix II of CITES and on Class B of the African Convention on the Conservation of Nature and Natural Resources.
