= Sexual swelling =

Swelling of genital and perineal skin in some mammals as a sign of fertility

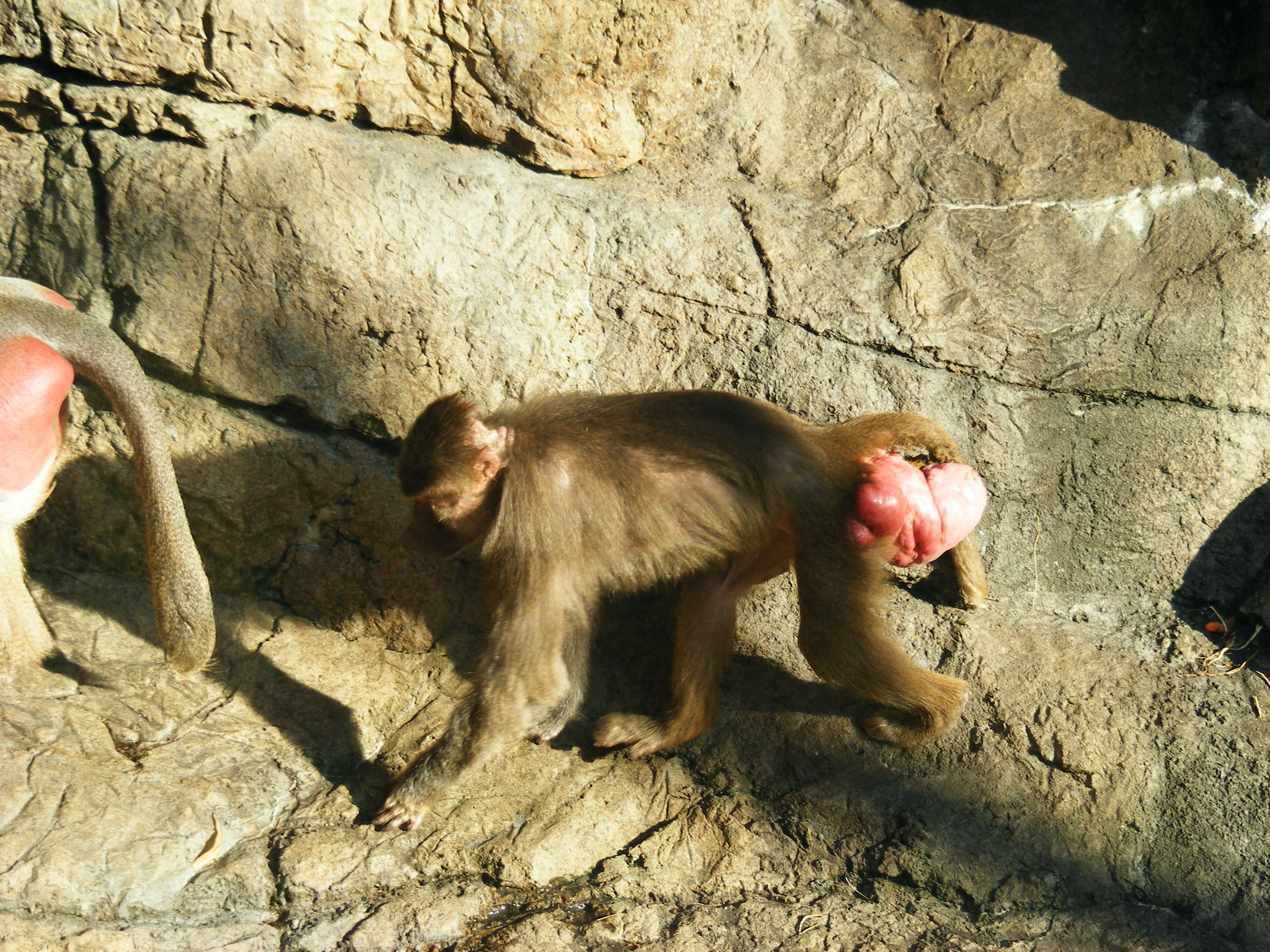
Sexual swelling in a female hamadryas baboon

Sexual swelling, sexual skin, or anogenital tumescence refers to localized engorgement of the anus and vulva region of some female primates that vary in size over the course of the menstrual cycle. Thought to be an honest signal of fertility, male primates are attracted to these swellings; preferring, and competing for, females with the largest swellings. Sexual swelling is widespread among primates but completely absent in humans and vervet monkeys. Females of these species exhibit concealed ovulation.

Though heavily investigated, the ultimate function of sexual swellings remains unknown. Over the last 50 years, eight principal explanations have been proposed, each claiming to account for the function of exaggerated swellings. Alone, however, no single hypothesis is believed to account for the function of sexual swellings; a combination of these theories may be more appropriate. In line with this ideal, the most recent account regarding the function of sexual swellings (the graded-signals hypothesis) combines several existing theories in the attempt to provide a more comprehensive account of sexual swellings.

== Characteristics ==
=== Physical characteristics and correlates ===
Sexual swellings are concentrations of tumescent tissue, cyclically appearing on the genitalia and adjacent posterior regions of female primates. The exact reproductive purpose of sexual swellings is not fully understood, though the erogenous sensitivity of this tissue is known to motivate females to pursue sexual contact with males. The position of swellings can heavily influence the location of male focus during courtship, and of eventual penetrance. Among chimpanzees, bonobos, baboons, and many Old World monkey species, it is common for swellings to concentrate in the perineal, perianal, and coccygeal regions, rather than more ventrally in the area of the vulva. Dorsal swelling positions can therefore correlate with frequent non-conceptive, penetrant mounting, thus enhancing high volume/low efficiency female mating strategies, which guard against incidental impregnation by opportunistic low-tier males during peak fertility.

Swellings can be categorized into two groups: small and exaggerated. Small swellings are characterised by a moderate size and pinkness of the anogenital tissue, and can be found in Old World monkeys, New World monkeys, prosimians and gibbons. In contrast, exaggerated swellings are larger in size, and their prevalence is mainly restricted to Old World primate species. For instance, they occur in all species of Cercocebus, Mandrillus, Theropithecus, Papio and Pan, and in most macaques, colobines and guenons.

Researchers have attempted to determine the characteristics of the primate species displaying these exaggerated swellings. It has been identified that species which exhibit exaggerated sexual swellings predominantly live in multi-male social systems, in which females mate promiscuously. Species with such swellings have twice as many males per group than those without. Furthermore, whilst 71% of Old World primate species living in multi-male groups show exaggerated swellings, no females living within single-male groups do. In some instances, however, sexual swellings can be seen in primate societies with alternative mating systems; for example, female langur monkeys exhibit swellings but live within polygamous single-male groups.

Primates with exaggerated sexual swellings also demonstrate non-seasonal breeding patterns, longer mating periods and longer ovulation cycles. Specifically, of the 23 species which are both non-seasonal breeders and live in multi-male societies, 91% have sexual swellings. Nonetheless, nonseasonal reproductive environments are not a necessary precursor for the selection of sexual swellings. Indeed, females who are seasonal breeders, such as the female Barbary macaques, also exhibit exaggerated sexual swellings.

=== Changes across the menstrual cycle ===
Exaggerated sexual swellings vary both in size and focal location throughout the female's cycle, beginning after menstruation. For example, research on baboons showed that after 14 days of gradual increase, swellings peaked for 2 days before reducing. Female chimpanzees exhibit a shift in swelling prominente. These cyclic changes in appearance of the sexual skin reflect the changes of ovarian hormones (estrogen and progestogen) during the female menstrual cycle. Specifically, the increase in sexual swelling size during the follicular phase is correlated with increased estrogen levels, and the decrease in swelling size during the luteal phase is associated with rising progesterone levels. It has been shown in ovariectomized chimpanzees that swelling can be induced by estrogen and inhibited by progesterone. As a result, the peak size of the swellings often coincides with the highest potential of ovulation, although this is not a perfect association. For example, research on West African chimpanzees showed that higher probabilities of ovulation tended to occur within 7 to 9 days of the onset of maximum swelling of sexual skin. Additionally, a study into wild white-handed gibbons showed that maximum swelling size and ovulation overlapped closely in 80% of menstrual cycles.

The size of sexual swellings not only varies within each cycle, but also across female cycles and across species. Specifically, the maximal swelling size increases from cycle to cycle for individual female chimpanzees and baboons. Additionally, the duration of maximal sexual swellings size varies considerably between species. Baboons for instance, have a maximal swelling lasting approximately 15.1 days, whilst the duration of maximal swelling is 10.9 days in chimpanzees.

Like size, location also varies considerably across the cycle. For instance, in chimpanzees, the state of maximum dorsality correlates with the period of maximum swelling.

=== Male responses to sexual swellings ===
Male primates are highly attracted to females when their sexual swellings are largest, and demonstrate preferential mating during periods of maximal swelling. Males tend to compete more for females whose swellings are at their maximum point. Male–male competition peaks, and males attempting to mate with the females with the largest swellings receive increased levels of aggression from other males as a result. Observations of chimpanzees have revealed that the presence of at least one female who was maximally swollen prompted higher levels of aggression between males in a group, as well as increased levels of sexual behaviour.

In general, males respond to female sexual swellings as though they provide indications of female fertility, using these swellings to determine their level of investment and effort in courting females. In male baboons, mating effort is determined by the size of the female's swellings, which, in turn, impacts levels of male-male aggression, competition and fighting behaviours, as well as how much time is invested in grooming and courting the female. Peak swelling also correlates with higher levels of mate guarding behaviour, with males preferring to guard those females whose swellings are close to or at maximal swelling, as well as performing more inspections of their anogenital areas.

The greater access to the most swollen females is usually granted to and won by the most dominant males in the group. Those further down the hierarchy tend to only be able to gain access and mate with females outside of these periods of peak swelling when the competition for them is reduced and the attention of more dominant males has shifted to the more swollen females in the group. In baboons, the more mature and dominant males mate most repetitively with the most receptive females at peak swelling. Young males get access to mate, though much less frequently, and only within the confines of female baboon mating strategy, which advantages non-conceptive mounting as a defense against them. Younger males have a slightly increased likelihood of conceptive mounting outside of peak swelling (e.g. early in the estrous cycle).

== Function ==
Though much is understood about the physical characteristics of sexual swellings, their exact functional significance remains controversial. The role of sexual selection in the evolution of these swellings features in many hypotheses, and has, since Darwin, been assumed to play a significant role. Hypothesised functions of sexual swellings often focus on swellings in terms of female mating strategies. These range from advertising fertility and quality (e.g. Reliable Indicator), maximising potential mates to confuse paternity of offspring (e.g. Many-Males), to aiding in a female's assessment of the best possible mating partners (e.g. Best-Male), and even assuring paternity certainty (e.g. Obvious-Ovulation), and all aim to account for aspects of exaggerated sexual swellings. This section covers the range of hypotheses that provide explanations of proposed functions for these swellings.

=== Sensory exploitation hypothesis ===
An altered version of Holland and Rice's chase-away model is cited to explain the function of sexual swellings. The chase-away model is governed by the idea of "sensory exploitation", in which traits evolve to greatly stimulate the perceivers' sensory system. As a result, these traits serve to manipulate a perceiver's behaviour in favour of the signaller. In the specific case of sexual swellings, it is a male's inherent preference for large swellings as a signal of fertility is exploited to combat male resistance to mate Therefore, small sexual swellings are thought to have become exaggerated as a form of antagonistic coevolution.

The association found between female fertility and sexual swelling size in several species of macaque offers support for this hypothesis. Specifically, females of low fertility, such as adolescents, exhibited substantially larger swellings than adults of a higher fertility level. Research remains fairly consistent across animal species; female yellow baboons (Papio cynocephalus) who struggle to conceive are, on average, those that display the most prominent sexual swellings. In contrast, some have been critical of the sensory exploitation theory; they uphold the belief that, if female sexual swellings were not honest signals of female fertility, males would have evolved to identify differences in female quality or to have equal preference over females with different swelling sizes.

=== Cost-of-sexual-attraction hypothesis ===
Wrangham proposed the cost-of-sexual-attraction hypothesis as a result of comparing the number of sexual cycles between conceptions that are experienced by both parous and nulliparous female chimpanzees, as well as parous western and eastern chimpanzees (Pan troglodytes verus and Pan troglodytes schweinfurthii), and the size of the sexual swellings that came with these differences. Through observing these groups in both species, he suggested that two factors are most important in determining how obviously a female displays the ovulatory stage in her cycle: the level of scramble competition that exists between the females of the group for resources such as food; and the difference in travelling costs for parous and nulliparous females.

With the assumption that females require a certain number of copulations before they can conceive, this would suggest that they may achieve this number faster either by having a high number of ovulatory cycles between conceptions, or by appearing more attractive to males around the time of ovulation by having larger swellings. However, more obvious ovulation leads to more male coercion, which may have negative consequences, such as undesired consortship from a low-ranking male, or injury from forcible mating. Therefore, females will only accept this high level of coercion if the scramble competition in their community is high, and if the coercion will allow them to reach their required number of copulations in a short time. For example, eastern chimpanzees who have previously produced offspring tend to experience high within-group scramble, and so are driven towards having fewer ovulatory cycles between conception. As a result, they need to mate with a high number of males during each ovulatory period. They therefore need to appear more attractive during these periods, and so they develop larger sexual swellings.

Although Wrangham's model was justified by his observations, there has not been much other support for the hypothesis. Deschner and Boesch investigated the hypothesis directly by observing the same species and found that it was unable to support their results, and so proposed the social passport hypothesis as an alternative.

=== Social passport hypothesis ===
A female chimpanzee's first sexual swelling occurs near the time when she first begins to explore different territories. This is a potentially dangerous period prior to a female's permanent emigration away from their native social group. Based on this observation, sexual swellings are believed to act as a "social passport" that advertises sexual receptivity during this transitional period between communities. The hypothesis proposes that the swelling transforms the potential aggression that males in the new social group may show to the female into sexual urges. This is thought to gain the female acceptance from males living within the new social group. In turn, this male acceptance reduces the likelihood that the female will be attacked by the males, and increases the likelihood that the males will protect them from hostile resident females. Under the social passport hypothesis, sexual swellings therefore allow a relatively safe passage between different communities; allowing adolescent females to investigate the local competitors and resources of different territories before deciding where to re-settle and breed permanently.

Under this hypothesis, young females who have safely integrated within the new community still benefit from sexual swellings. Specifically, young females are believed to require the support of the males acquired when integrating into the new group during conflicts with females of a higher social rank, or when protecting their infants from fights with the children of these higher-ranking females. Therefore, sexual swellings act as a social passport that eases female-female interactions.

Investigation into the social passport hypothesis has yielded contradictory results. Observations of common chimpanzees (Pan troglodytes) in the Tai Forest, for instance, led to the discovery that sterile adolescent females or subordinate mothers exhibit swellings upon their emigration to new communities, suggesting that the swellings do indeed function to eliminate any social stress that could be directed at them during the emigration period. However, research on olive colobus monkeys (Procolobus verus) residing in the same region showed females to emigrate without displaying sexual swellings. On the basis of this evidence, it has been suggested that the social passport hypothesis is not an appropriate explanation of the function of sexual swellings in this species.

=== Male services hypothesis ===
The male services hypothesis proposes that sexual swellings lead to direct benefits for the female by encouraging dominant males to engage in consortship behaviours (i.e. forming a partnership). Swellings elicit mate guarding behaviours from males who want to increase their chances of siring the swollen female's offspring, resulting in dominant males acting like bodyguards, to reduce and prevent harassment from other males in the social group. Females may also benefit in that dominant males may later protect the resulting offspring, reducing the threat of infanticide from other males. It has been observed that male primates will attempt to monopolise, or gain exclusive sexual access to, a female early on in the duration of sexual swellings to ensure he has sexual access at maximum swelling when she is most likely to be ovulating. Though the males in these situations are guarding the females for their own gains (i.e. to ensure they will be able to sire the female's offspring) it has been observed in rhesus macaque (Macaca mulatta) that females also benefit from these consortships, and are harassed less by subordinate males when they are with a dominant one.

The male services hypothesis is praised for its ability to account for the evidence that swellings do not always precisely indicate ovulation; the lack of precision is likely to extend the duration of mate guarding and consortship behaviours outlined by the hypothesis. Some of its predictions are not met, however. For instance, despite the benefits of a reduction in harassment from subordinate males when with dominant males, it has been observed that females do not always choose to mate with these stronger and more dominant mates.

=== Obvious-ovulation hypothesis ===
The obvious-ovulation (or paternity confidence) hypothesis of sexual swellings was first suggested by Hamilton in 1984. The hypothesis proposes that exaggerated swellings indicate the timing of ovulation and as a result increase paternal certainty, allowing males to assess if they have been successful in siring that female's offspring. This has benefits for the female and her offspring, as paternal certainty has been frequently associated with the level of paternal care and investment. The obvious-ovulation hypothesis therefore suggests that sexual swellings function as an indicator of ovulation to males who can then be assured of the offspring's paternity, in order to encourage the male to invest preferentially in that female's offspring. This is similar to the paternal care hypothesis, which proposes that sexual swellings enable a male to determine the likelihood of having sired a particular female's offspring by signalling her ovulation status, allowing them to subsequently allocate investment accordingly based on their assessment of whether they have achieved paternity.

The obvious-ovulation explanation of sexual swellings is consistent with the observation that ovulation often coincides with maximum swelling. Further support that males use swellings in the way set out by this hypothesis to assess the timing of ovulation comes from observations that in wild long-tailed macaques (Macaca fascicularis): males are more aroused and find females more attractive at peak swelling. Others have been critical of this hypothesis, however. According to Stallman and Froehlich's assessment, the hypothesis predicts monandry (i.e. that females will have only one mating partner), which runs counter to observations of species such as Barbary macaques (Macaca sylvanus), which have exaggerated sexual swellings, yet have been seen to be promiscuous and polyandrous (i.e. mating with multiple males) in their mating behaviours.

=== Best-male hypothesis ===
The best-male hypothesis for sexual swellings is one of the longest standing explanations for the function of sexual swellings in primates. The hypothesis proposes that sexual swellings incite competition between males for access to a female by indicating her fertility and receptivity. This allows the female to identify the eventual winner as the "best male", with higher fitness and the best genes to pass on to her offspring. The hypothesis therefore proposes that sexual swellings are signals by which females, through advertising that they are receptive to mating, aim to increase their chances of high quality offspring by inciting competition between males in a group. Under the best-male hypothesis, the male with whom the female eventually copulates is the result of indirect mate choice, as the female does not have to directly assess the fitness of each potential partner; rather, her sexual swelling attracts competing males and results in the benefit of increased viability of her offspring.

Support for this hypothesis argues that it accounts for some of the correlates and characteristics of sexual swellings, such as the proximity of peak swelling to ovulation, and increased male-male competition over females at peak swelling. The best-male hypothesis has been criticised, however, for its inability to account for the exaggerated nature of these swellings. Specifically, Pagel argued smaller swellings would be sufficient to incite competition between males since this behaviour was calculated to be an evolutionarily stable strategy. Others have criticised the assumption that the male which is successful in competition for swollen females (i.e. the most dominant) would also be the females own choice of partner, as it has been observed that some females choose to mate with subordinate males.

=== Many males hypothesis ===
According to Hrdy's many males hypothesis, sexual swellings enable a female to attract multiple different males as mating partners. This is attributed to males having an instinctive attraction to the swellings. By mating with several males across their menstrual cycle in this manner, a female can increase the males' parental uncertainty. Parental uncertainty describes the eventuality where males are uncertain as to whether the offspring of the female they have mated with is genetically his own. This uncertainty has two contrasting outcomes: it may increase the total amount of parental care that their offspring receives, whilst also reducing the possibility that a female's offspring suffers infanticide. For example, it was discovered that male captive ruffled lemurs (Varecia variegata) were less likely to kill infants that they believed themselves to have sired, supporting Hrdy's second proposition.

To successfully ensure paternal confusion, Hrdy predicted that ovulation must be randomly distributed across the term where the sexual swelling is of maximum tumescence. This would ensure that males were unable to use the swelling as a signal of female fertility. One example of this stems from research into sooty mangabey (Cercocebus atys); the females of this species have been found to produce sexual swellings both when they are fertile and when they are with child. Additionally, sexual swellings are only observed during the most fertile period of a female's menstrual cycle in 26-35 species of anthropoid primates, in contrast to Hrdy's prediction.

=== Graded-signals hypothesis ===
The graded-signals hypothesis was first suggested by Nunn in 1999, and suggests that exaggerated sexual swellings exist in female primates to indicate their fertile period to the males of the species. A larger swelling suggests that ovulation is more likely to occur, thus indicating the phase when the female is most fertile.

Inter-sexual conflict is considered, within this hypothesis, to be a key factor in the development of exaggerated sexual swellings. As male reproductive strategies of coercion (including infanticide and prolonged mate-guarding) may be costly to females, it has been necessary for females to resist these through developing features or counter-strategies that will protect them whilst still allowing for successful reproduction. This can be explained through the combination of a number of previously mentioned hypotheses; most notably obvious-ovulation, best-male, and many males.

In terms of obvious-ovulation, the swelling of the perineal skin has been likened to a distribution curve that would represent that probability that the female would ovulate, with larger swellings suggesting that ovulation is more likely to occur. As such, females are more likely to attract the attention of dominant, or "better", males when their swelling size peaks, and it has been shown that dominant males tend to only mate-guard at this peak swelling point, thus including the best-males hypothesis. This mate-guarding is costly to the male, and so they tend only to monopolise any single female for the most likely period of ovulation; once her swellings start to shrink, the male will move onto a female whose swellings are still growing to reach their peak. In these periods before and after the peak, females still continue to mate with lower-ranking males, as their probability of ovulation is not so high, but conception is still possible. This then serves to confuse the paternity of the offspring amongst the males, linking to the many-males hypothesis, and also resulting in reduced infanticide by the males within the species. Therefore, the protective role of the swellings against male coercion serve, in some ways, to manipulate male behaviour into benefiting the female, and enhancing the female's chances at successful reproduction.

As one of the more recent hypotheses, the graded-signals hypothesis still has limited research supporting it as the evolutionary function of sexual swellings. However, the growing literature base is supportive of the hypothesis; if not as the sole reason behind the evolution of the swellings, then perhaps in conjunction with the reliable indicator hypothesis.

=== Reliable indicator hypothesis ===
Having reasoned that the best-male and many-males hypotheses did not fully explain why estrus must be advertised so prominently, Pagel proposed the reliable indicator hypothesis, suggesting that exaggerated swellings evolved through sexual selection due to the need for an honest signal of female quality (both their likelihood of conception and their genetic quality) as a result of female-female competition to attract males. The hypothesis makes several assumptions: that females compete for access to male mates; that females differ in quality; that the characteristics of their sexual swellings honestly reflect these differences; and that males use certain swelling characteristics to allocate their mating efforts to the highest quality females. Should this be the case, swellings should occur in communities consisting of multiple adults of both sexes, in which males are the choosier sex due to the high mating costs of such groups, and when female competition is at its greatest. Such conditions have been described as "reversed sexual selection", as it is the females that ultimately make the mate choice in most species, and seemingly only this hypothesis that suggests the opposite.

For such a signalling system to be a reliable indicator of quality, it must fulfil two criteria: that the trait is costly to produce, and that mating effort is costly for the males in the group. In regards to sexual swellings, both of these ring true. In terms of costliness, swellings affect a female's weight and centre of gravity, affecting their ease when travelling. The skin itself increases vulnerability to predators due to its conspicuousness, as well as to infection. Additionally, the increased attention from males also puts females at a risk of injury through male aggression. In terms of the cost to males, mate guarding has been found to significantly reduce foraging in male baboons, therefore reducing their available food. Additionally, males expend effort in both grooming and consorting the female with whom they are mating, as well as warding off other males; the more attractive the female is, the greater the male-male competition, therefore increasing the risk to the male, as fights between baboons are potentially lethal.

Although Pagel performed a field experiment which found support for all predictions of the hypothesis through the observation of olive baboons (Papio anubis), its methodology has since been criticised, and subsequent research has failed to find empirical evidence that sexual swellings reliably indicate female quality in this, and other, species (e.g. chimpanzees, mandrills, and barbary macaques). For example, one of the main predictions is that higher quality, and therefore most fertile, females should consistently display the largest swellings. However, the largest swellings often occur in the least fertile females, or those least likely to raise surviving offspring; adolescents, those that have never borne offspring, and those that have had several ovulation cycles without conceiving.

Despite the lack of empirical evidence for this hypothesis being the sole evolutionary function for exaggerated sexual swelling, it has been suggested that the reliable indicator hypothesis may work together with the graded-signals hypothesis. This suggestion is based on evidence that swelling size advertises the level of fertility, and therefore reproductive quality, between one female's ovulation cycles, rather than between the overall quality of each female. Therefore, males may initially use swelling size as a cue to identify which females are close to ovulation (as predicted by graded-signals), before considering each females' swelling size as an indicator of their quality, and then choosing the female with the larger swelling (as predicted by reliable indicator). This would also account for the variable patterns in swelling size fluctuation across species and populations.

== See also ==
- Red dress effect
