= Infanticide in primates =

Infanticide in non-human primates occurs when an individual kills its own or another individual's dependent young. Five hypotheses have been proposed to explain infanticide in non-human primates: exploitation, resource competition, parental manipulation, sexual selection, and social pathology.

== Hypotheses for infanticide ==
=== Exploitation ===
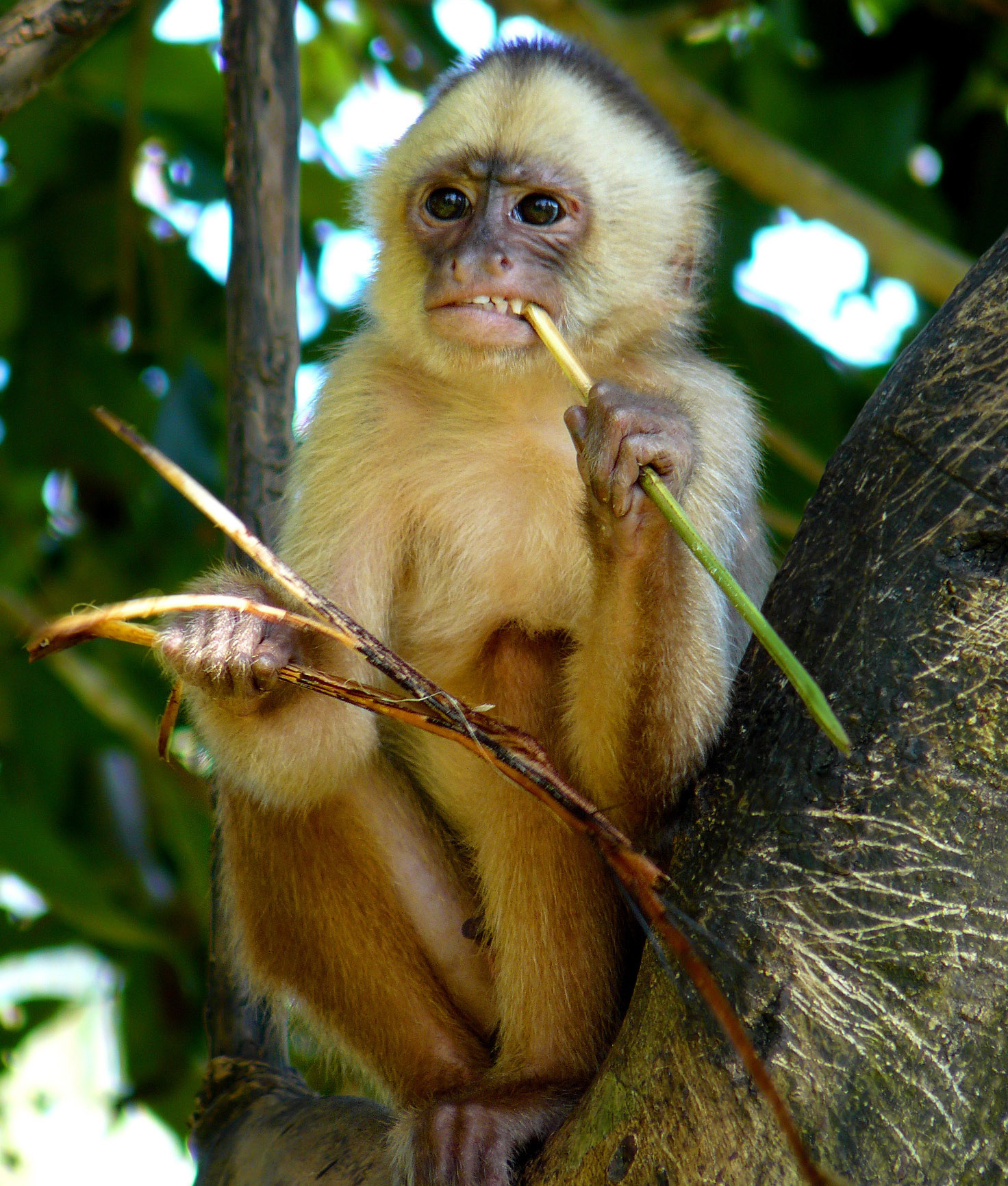
A white-fronted capuchin sits in a tree. Cases of infanticide in white fronted capuchins have been attributed to resource competition.

Infanticide in non-human primates occurs as a result of exploitation when the individuals performing the infanticide directly benefit from consumption or use of their victim. The individual can become a resource: food (cannibalism); a protective buffer against aggression, or a prop to obtain maternal experience.

The form of exploitation in non-human primates most attributable to adult females is when non-lactating females take an infant from its mother (allomothering) and forcibly retain it until starvation. This behavior is known as the "aunting to death" phenomenon; these non-lactating female primates gain mothering-like experience, yet lack the resources to feed the infant. This behaviour has been seen in captive bonobos, but not wild ones. It is not clear if it is a natural bonobo trait or the result of living in captivity. Male orangutans have not been directly observed practicing infanticide as a reproductive strategy, but recorded case of a male abducting an infant almost resulting in said infant dying from dehydration was observed. Additionally, a possible case of infanticide has been inferred, in which a mother orangutan had lost an infant and received a serious injury on her foot shortly after a new male had been introduced nearby. Although not directly observed, it is inferred this male attacked the female and killed her infant.

=== Resource competition ===
Resource competition results when there are too few resources in a particular area to support the existing population. In primates, resource competition is a prime motivator for infanticide. Infanticide motivated by resource competition can occur both outside of and within familial groups. Dominant, high ranking, female chimpanzees have been shown to more often aggress towards a lower ranking female and her infant due to resource competition. Primates from outside of familial groups might infiltrate areas and kill infants from other groups to eliminate competition for resources. When resources are limited, infants are easier to eliminate from the competition pool than other group members because they are the most defenseless and thus become targets of infanticide. Primate infanticide motivated by resource competition can also involve cannibalizing the infant as a source of nutrition.

Resource competition is also a primary motivator in inter-species infanticide, or the killing of infants from one species by another species. Through eliminating infants of another species in the same environment, the probability that the aggressor and their own infants will obtain more resources increases. This behavior has been an observed consequence of multiple primate inter-species conflicts. In these cases, instances of direct aggression toward inter-specific infants in addition to infanticide have also been observed. In these instances of direct aggression, the aggressor was the previous target of intra-species aggression directed towards them. Therefore, the direct aggression and infanticide carried out by these aggressors could be attributed to re-directed aggression.

=== Parental manipulation ===
==== Maternal infanticide ====
Maternal infanticide, the killing of dependent young by the mother, is rare in non-human primates and has been reported only a handful of times. Maternal infanticide has been reported once in brown mantled tamarins, Saguinus fuscicollis, once in black fronted titis, Callicebus nigrifrons, and four times in mustached tamarins, Saguinus mystax. It is proposed that maternal infanticide occurs when the mother assesses the probability for infant survival based on previous infant deaths. If it is unlikely that the infant will survive, infanticide may occur. This may allow the mother to invest more in her current offspring or future offspring, leading to a greater net reproductive fitness in the mother.

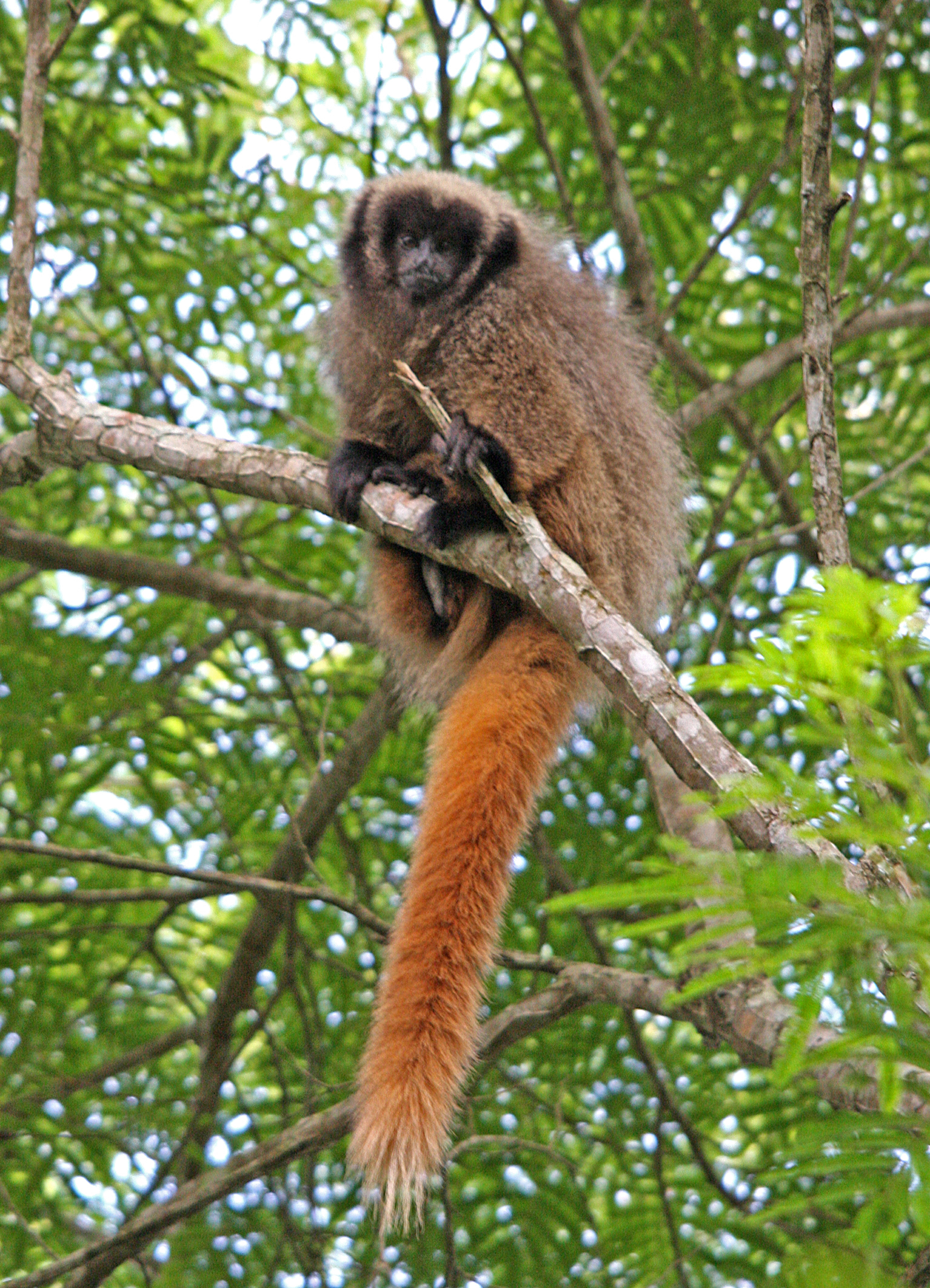
Callicebus nigrifrons perched in the trees. Maternal infanticide due to resource competition has been reported in C. nigifrons.

In the instances of maternal infanticide in tamarins, there were multiple breeding females. The parental manipulation hypothesis proposes that maternal infanticide occurs more frequently when the group has a poor capacity to raise offspring, multiple breeding females, birth intervals shorter than three months, and low infant survival probability.

Maternal infanticide differs from other varieties of infanticide in that the resource competition and sexual selection hypotheses (see other sections) must be rejected. Resource competition and sexual selection are ruled out because it is the mother that is performing the infanticide, not another female.

In one case of maternal infanticide in wild black-fronted titi monkeys (Callicebus nigrifrons), the observed deceased infant was clinically healthy with no signs of health abnormalities. Therefore, infanticide did not appear to occur due to low viability of infant. Additionally, overcrowding or feeding competition were not factors in infanticide. In this case, there were no clear functions of the infanticide; the reason for infanticide in black-fronted titi monkeys is currently unknown.

=== Sexual selection ===
==== Sexual competition ====
Infanticide increases a male's reproductive success when he takes over a new troop of females. This behavior has been observed in langurs who live in single male breeding groups. The females whose infants were killed exhibited estrous behavior and copulated with the new leader. These effects result from acceleration of the termination of lactational amenorrhea. This provides an advantage to the male because the female will more quickly copulate with him and raise his young rather than the young from the previous mate; his fitness increases through use of infanticide. Infanticide in one-male breeding units has also been observed in red-tailed monkeys and blue monkeys. In addition to single male breeding groups, sexually selected infanticide often occurs in multi-male, multi-female breeding groups including the red howler and the mantled howler. Adult Japanese macaque males were eight times more likely to attack infants when females had not mated with the male himself.

Infanticide by females other than the mother have been observed in wild groups of common marmosets (Callithrix jacchus). Most cases of such behavior have been attributed to the resource competition hypothesis, in which females can gain more access to resources for herself and for her young by killing unrelated infants. Although commonly used in the context of food or shelter, the resource competition model can be applied to other limited resources, such as breeding opportunities or access to helpers. Most callitrichids have restrictive breeding patterns, which would be compatible with the model, but this infanticide behavior has only been documented in wild groups of common marmosets and not in wild groups of other callitrichid species. The higher frequency in common marmosets may be due to a variety of social, reproductive, and ecological characteristics - including higher likelihood for overlapping pregnancies and births (due to short intervals between births), habitat saturation, and lower costs of infant care compared to other callitrichids - that increase the chance of two breeding females inhabiting the same group, leading to more intense competition. In most observed cases in common marmosets, the socially dominant breeding females killed the infants of a subordinate female, allowing them to maintain their dominance.

==== Paternal infanticide ====
Paternal infanticide is rarely observed in non-human primates. In an extensive study of wild Japanese macaques which tracked instances of infanticide, DNA analysis revealed that males would not attack their own offspring or offspring of a female with whom they mated. Further, females in the study were found to be motivated to form social bonds with males in order to protect them from infanticide.

=== Social pathology: role of social organization ===
In mammals, interaction between the sexes is usually limited to the female estrous or copulation. However, in non-human primates, these male-female bonds persist past the estrous. Social relationships between males and females in primates are hypothesized to serve as protection against male infanticide. Year-round association serves to lower the probability of infanticide by other males. In addition, many primates live in multi-female groups, and it has been proposed that these females live together to reduce the risk of infanticide through paternity confusion or concealed ovulation. However, complex interactions can arise when females have different social rankings and when resource availability is threatened. Most often, dominant females opportunistically kill the young of a less dominant female when competition arises.

== Adaptive counter adaptations to infanticide ==
Many primate species have developed counter adaptations to reduce the likelihood of infanticide. These strategies include physical defense, paternity confusion, reproduction suppression, and accelerated development.

=== Physical defense ===
The most immediate and obvious form of protection against infanticide is physical defense wherein mothers either directly prevent aggressive acts toward their offspring or recruit other individuals for assistance. Female primates have been observed to actively defend territory from potentially infanticidal females, as seen in chimpanzees. In order to recruit the non-parental assistance in defense, female chacma baboons utilize "friendships" with males, wherein the male forms a bond with the infant until weaning, that may serve to protect their offspring from aggression by higher ranking males or females.

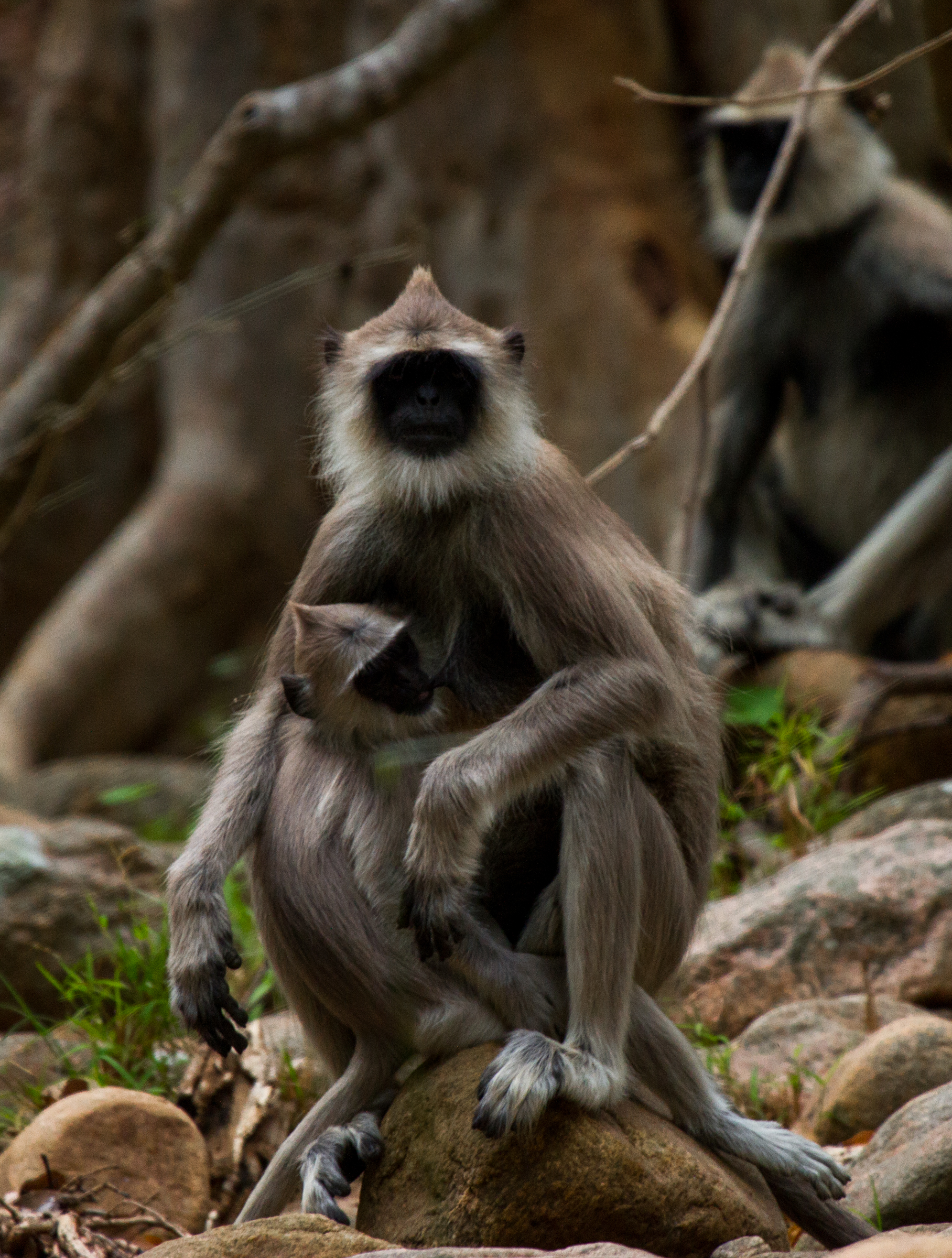
A Hanuman langur mother feeding an infant. Female Hanuman langurs are known to utilize paternity confusion through concealed ovulation.

To protect their young from infanticide, many species of primate mothers will form social monogamous pairs to prevent paternal infanticide. In these pairs, the males will mate with other females but live exclusively with one female as a socially monogamous pair. Forming this socially monogamous pair causes the males to form parental relationships and social bonds with the female's offspring. These bonds motivate males to defend their offspring against infanticide from unrelated individuals and to never commit infanticide against their own offspring. This form of social monogamy has been observed in gibbons, siamangs, baboons, and macaques.

One study demonstrated that for gorillas, living in harem-style groups reduces a female's risk of infanticide more than if she mated with multiple males. A female gorilla benefits more from protection by the silverback male, despite the fact that mating with only one male increased paternity certainty and thus increases the number of males in the population that would benefit reproductively from infanticide. However, it is likely that antipredation is also a closely linked motivation to the formation of gorilla social units.

=== Paternity confusion ===
Females utilize paternity confusion to reduce the likelihood that a male she has mated with will kill her offspring. There are several ways this is accomplished including concealed ovulation. Female catarrhine primates such as hanuman langurs have evolved an extended estrous state with variable ovulation in order to conceal the paternity of the fertilization. Another important situation in which paternity confusion can arise is when females mate with multiple males; this includes mating patterns such as polyandry and promiscuity in multi-male multi-female groups. Similar to promiscuous mating, female primates are proceptive during the first and second trimester of pregnancy in order to increase paternity confusion of their offspring. Finally, in multi-male multi-female groups, female synchrony, in which females are all fertile at the same time, can prohibit the dominant male from monopolizing all of the females. This also allows sneak copulations in which non-dominant males sire offspring. Female synchrony also serves to reduce risk of female infanticide by forcing potentially infanticidal females to focus on provisioning their own infants rather than acting aggressively. But there is some evidence to suggest that female synchrony serves to increase competition pressures and thus aggression in females.

=== Reproduction suppression ===
Females may also avoid the costs of continued reproductive investment when infanticide is likely. One such occurrence is known as the Bruce Effect, in which female primates may abort the pregnancy when presented with a new male. This has been observed in wild geladas, where a majority of females abort pregnancies following the displacement of a dominant male. Feticide is a related but distinct phenomenon by which physical or psychological trauma mediated by male behavior results in fetal loss. For example, in baboons at Amboseli, rates of fetal loss increase following the immigration of aggressive males.

In some social systems, lower-ranking primate females may delay reproduction to avoid infanticide by dominant females, as seen in common marmosets. In one instance, the dominant marmoset female killed the offspring of a subordinate female. This phenomenon of reproduction suppression is also well observed in tamarins.

=== Accelerated development ===
In order to reduce the amount of time that infants are particularly vulnerable to infanticide, females have been shown to wean infants earlier when risk of infanticide is high. For example, female white-headed leaf monkeys were observed to wean their infants significantly more quickly during male takeovers as compared to socially stable periods. Females with infants too young to be weaned left with the old males and returned after their offspring had fully weaned, again after a significantly shorter weaning period than during stable times.

== See also ==
- Infanticide
- Infanticide (zoology)
- Infanticide in carnivores
- Infanticide in rodents
- Sexual selection
- Siblicide
