= Menstruation (mammal) =

Periodic shedding of the uterine lining

Menstruation is the shedding of the uterine lining (endometrium) in some mammals. It occurs on a regular basis in uninseminated sexually reproductive-age females of certain mammal species.

Although there is some disagreement in definitions between sources, menstruation is generally considered to be limited to primates. It is common in simians (Old World monkeys, New World monkeys, and apes), but completely lacking in strepsirrhine primates and possibly weakly present in tarsiers. Beyond primates, it is known only in bats, the elephant shrew, and the spiny mouse species Acomys cahirinus. Overt menstruation (where there is bleeding from the uterus through the vagina) is found primarily in humans and close relatives such as chimpanzees.

Females of other species of placental mammals undergo estrous cycles, in which the endometrium is completely reabsorbed by the animal (covert menstruation) at the end of its reproductive cycle. Many zoologists regard this as different from "true" menstrual cycle. Female domestic animals used for breeding—for example dogs, pigs, cattle, or horses—are monitored for physical signs of an estrous cycle period, which indicates that the animal is ready for insemination.

== Estrus and menstruation ==
Females of most mammal species advertise fertility to males with visual behavioral cues, pheromones, or both. This period of advertised fertility is known as oestrus, "estrus" or heat. In species that experience estrus, females are generally only receptive to copulation while they are in heat (dolphins are an exception). In the estrous cycles of most placentals, if no fertilization takes place, the uterus reabsorbs the endometrium. This breakdown of the endometrium without vaginal discharge is sometimes called covert menstruation. Overt menstruation (where there is blood flow from the vagina) occurs primarily in humans and close evolutionary relatives such as chimpanzees. Some species, such as domestic dogs, experience small amounts of vaginal bleeding while approaching heat; this discharge has a different physiologic cause than menstruation.

=== Concealed ovulation ===
A few mammals do not experience obvious, visible signs of fertility (concealed ovulation). In humans, studies show that both males and females can detect the fertility of females through hormonal signaling and alterations in scent (fertility awareness), but some research suggests that behavioral clues may be needed to consciously assess fertility.

Orangutans also lack visible signs of impending ovulation. Also, it has been said that the extended estrus period of the bonobo (reproductive-age females are in heat for 75% of their menstrual cycle) has a similar effect to the lack of a "heat" in human females.

=== Evolution ===
Most female mammals have an estrous cycle, yet only some primate and bat species, the elephant shrew, and one known species of spiny mouse have a menstrual cycle. As these groups are not closely related, it is likely that four distinct evolutionary events have caused menstruation to arise.

There are varying views on evolution of overt menstruation in humans and related species, and the evolutionary advantages in losing blood associated with dismantling the uterine lining rather than absorbing it, as most mammals do. The reason is likely related to differences in the ovulation process.

Most female placentals have a uterine lining that builds up when the animal begins ovulation, and later further increases in thickness and blood flow after a fertilized egg has successfully implanted. This final process of thickening is known as decidualization, and is usually triggered by hormones released by the embryo. In humans, decidualization happens spontaneously at the beginning of each menstrual cycle, triggered by hormonal signals from the ovaries. For this reason, the human uterine lining becomes fully thickened during each cycle as a defense to trophoblast penetration of the endometrial wall, regardless of whether an egg becomes fertilized or successfully implants in the uterus. This produces more unneeded material per cycle than in non-menstruating mammals, which may explain why the extra material is not simply reabsorbed as done by those species. In essence, menstruating animals treat every cycle as a possible pregnancy by thickening the protective layer around the endometrial wall, while non-menstruating placental mammals do not begin the pregnancy process until a fertilized egg has implanted in the uterine wall.

For this reason, it is speculated that menstruation is a side effect of spontaneous decidualization, which evolved in some placental mammals due to its advantages over non-spontaneous decidualization. Spontaneous decidualization allows for more maternal control in the maternal-fetal conflict by increasing selectivity over the implanted embryo. This may be necessary in humans and other primates, due to the abnormally large number of genetic disorders in these species. Since most aneuploidy events result in stillbirth or miscarriage, there is an evolutionary advantage to ending the pregnancy early, rather than nurturing a fetus that will later miscarry. There is evidence to show that some abnormalities in the developing embryo can be detected by endometrial stromal cells in the uterus, but only upon differentiation into decidual cells. This triggers epigenetic changes that prevent formation of the placenta, which prevents the embryo from implanting and leaves it to be removed in the next menstruation. This failsafe mode is not possible in species where decidualization is controlled by hormonal triggers from the embryo. This is sometimes referred to as the choosy uterus theory, and it is theorized that this positive outweighs the negative impacts of menstruation in species with high aneuploidy rates and hence a high number of 'doomed' embryos.
