= Reproductive success =

Passing of genes on to the next generation in a way that they too can pass on those genes

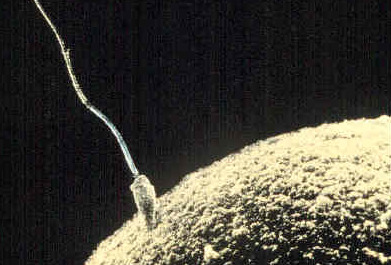
A sperm fertilizing an egg in sexual reproduction is one stage of reproductive success.

Reproductive success is an individual's production of offspring per breeding event or lifetime. This is not limited by the number of offspring produced by one individual, but also the reproductive success of these offspring themselves.

Reproductive success is different from fitness in that individual success is not necessarily a determinant for adaptive strength of a genotype since the effects of chance and the environment have no influence on those specific genes. Reproductive success turns into a part of fitness when the offspring are actually recruited into the breeding population. If offspring quantity is not correlated with quality this holds up, but if not then reproductive success must be adjusted by traits that predict juvenile survival in order to be measured effectively.

Quality and quantity is about finding the right balance between reproduction and maintenance. The disposable soma theory of aging tells us that a longer lifespan will come at the cost of reproduction and thus longevity is not always correlated with high fecundity.

Parental investment is a key factor in reproductive success since taking better care to offspring is what often will give them a fitness advantage later in life. This includes mate choice and sexual selection as an important factor in reproductive success, which is another reason why reproductive success is different from fitness as individual choices and outcomes are more important than genetic differences. As reproductive success is measured over generations, longitudinal studies are the preferred study type as they follow a population or an individual over a longer period of time in order to monitor the progression of the individual(s). These long term studies are preferable since they negate the effects of the variation in a single year or breeding season.

== Nutritional contribution ==
Nutrition is one of the factors that influences reproductive success. For example, different amounts of consumption and more specifically carbohydrate to protein ratios. In some cases, the amounts or ratios of intake are more influential during certain stages of the lifespan. For example, in the Mexican fruit fly, male protein intake is critical only at eclosion. Intake at this time provides longer lasting reproductive ability. After this developmental stage, protein intake will have no effect and is not necessary for reproductive success. In addition, Ceratitis capitata males were experimented on to see how protein influence during the larval stage affects mating success. Males were fed either a high protein diet, which consisted of 6.5g/100mL, or a no protein diet during the larval stage. Males that were fed protein had more copulations than those that were not fed protein, which ultimately correlates with a higher mating success. Protein-deprived black blow fly males have been seen to exhibit lower numbers of oriented mounts and inseminate fewer females than more lively fed males. In still other instances, prey deprivation or an inadequate diet has been shown to lead to a partial or complete halt in male mating activity. Copulation time lasted longer for sugar-fed males than protein-fed flies, showing that carbohydrates were more necessary for a longer copulation duration.

In mammals, amounts of protein, carbohydrates, and fats are seen to influence reproductive success. This was evaluated among 28 female black bears evaluated by measuring the number of cubs born. Using different foods during the fall including corn, herbaceous, red oak, beech, and cherry, nutritional facts of protein, carbohydrate, and fat were noted, as each varied in percent compositions. Seventy-percent of the bears who had high fat and high carbohydrate diets produced cubs. Conversely, all 10 females who had low carbohydrate diets did not reproduce cubs, deeming carbohydrates a critical factor for reproductive success where fat was not a hindrance.

Adequate nutrition at pre-mating time periods showed to have the most effect on various reproductive processes in mammals. Increased nutrition, in general, during this time was most beneficial for oocyte and embryo development. As a result, offspring number and viability was also improved. Thus, proper nutrition timing during the pre-mating time is key for development and long-term benefit of the offspring. Two different diets were fed to Florida scrub-jays and breeding performance was noted to have different effects. One diet consisted of high protein and high fat, and the other consisting of just high fat. The significant result was that the birds with the high protein and high fat diet laid heavier eggs than the birds with the rich-in-fat diet. There was a difference in the amount of water inside the eggs, which accounted for the different weights. It is hypothesized that the added water resulting from the adequate protein-rich and fat-rich diet may contribute to development and survival of the chick, therefore aiding reproductive success.

Dietary intake also improves egg production, which can also be considered to help create viable offspring. Post-mating changes are seen in organisms in response to necessary conditions for development. This is depicted in the two-spotted cricket where feeding was tested for in females. It was found that mated females exhibited more overall consumption than unmated. Observations of female crickets showed that after laying their eggs, their protein intake increased towards the end of the second day. The female crickets therefore require a larger consumption of protein to nourish the development of subsequent eggs and even mating. More specifically, using geometrical framework analysis, mated females fed off of a more protein rich diet after mating. Unmated and mated female crickets were found to prefer a 2:1 and 3.5:1 protein to carbohydrate, respectively. In the Japanese quail, the influence of diet quality on egg production was studied. The diet quality differed in the percent composition of protein, with the high-protein diet having 20%, and the low-protein diet having 12%. It was found that both the number of eggs produced and the size of the eggs were greater in the high-protein diet than the low. What was found unaffected, however, was the maternal antibody transmission. Thus, immune response was not affected since there was still a source of protein, although low. This means that the bird is able to compensate for the lack of protein in the diet by protein reserves, for example.

Higher concentrations of protein in diet have also positively correlated with gamete production across various animals. The formation of oothecae in brown-banded cockroaches based on protein intake was tested. A protein intake of 5% deemed too low as it delayed mating and an extreme of 65% protein directly killed the cockroach. Oothecae production for the female as was more optimal at a 25% protein diet.

Although there is a trend of protein and carbohydrates being essential for various reproductive functions including copulation success, egg development, and egg production, the ratio and amounts of each are not fixed. These values vary across a span of animals, from insects to mammals. For example, many insects may need a diet consisting of both protein and carbohydrates with a slightly higher protein ratio for reproductive success. On the other hand, a mammal like a black bear would need a higher amount of carbohydrates and fats, but not necessarily protein. Different types of animals have different necessities based on their make-up. One cannot generalize as the results may vary across different types of animals, and even more across different species.

== Cooperative breeding ==
Evolutionarily, humans are socially well adapted to their environment and coexist with one another in a way that benefits the entire species. Cooperative breeding, the ability for humans to invest in and help raise others' offspring, is an example of some of their unique characteristics that sets them apart from other non-human primates even though some practice this system at a low frequency. One of the reasons why humans require significantly more non-parental investment in comparison to other species is because they are still dependent on adults to take care of them throughout most of their juvenile period. Cooperative breeding can be expressed through economic support that requires humans to financially invest in someone else's offspring or through social support, which may require active energy investment and time. This parenting system eventually aids people in increasing their survival rate and reproductive success as a whole. Hamilton's rule and kin selection are used to explain why this altruistic behavior has been naturally selected and what non-parents gain by investing in offspring that is not their own. Hamilton's rule states that rb > c where r= relatedness, b= benefit to recipient, c= cost of the helper. This formula describes the relationship that has to occur among the three variables for kin selection take place. If the relative genetic relatedness of the helper with the offspring is closer and their benefit is greater than the cost of the helper, then kin selection will be most likely be favored. Even though kin selection does not benefit individuals who invest in relatives' offspring, it still highly increases the reproduction success of a population by ensuring genes are being passed down to the next generation.

== Humans ==
Some research has suggested that historically, women have had a far higher reproductive success rate than men. Dr. Baumeister has suggested that the modern human has twice as many female ancestors as male ancestors.

Males and females should be considered separately in reproduction success for their different limitations in producing the maximum amount of offspring. Females have limitations such as gestation time (typically 9 months), then followed by lactation which suppresses ovulation and her chances of becoming pregnant again quickly. In addition, a female's ultimate reproductive success is limited due to ability to distribute her time and energy towards reproducing. Peter T. Ellison states, "The metabolic task of converting energy from the environment into viable offspring falls to the female, and the rate at which she can produce offspring is limited by the rate at which she can direct metabolic energy to the task" The reasoning for the transfer of energy from one category to another takes away from each individual category overall. For example, if a female has not reached menarche yet, she will only need to be focusing her energy into growth and maintenance because she cannot yet place energy towards reproducing. However, once a female is ready to begin putting forth energy into reproduction she will then have less energy to put towards overall growth and maintenance.

Females have a constraint on the amount of energy they will need to put forth into reproduction. Since females go through gestation they have a set obligation for energy output into reproduction. Males, however, do no have this constraint and therefore could potentially put forth more offspring as their commitment of energy into reproduction is less than a females. All things considered, men and women are constrained for different reasons and the number of offspring they can produce. Males contrastingly are not constrained by the time and energy of gestation or lactation. Females are reliant on the genetic quality of their mate as well. This refers to sperm quality of the male and the compatibility of the sperms antigens with the females immune system. If the Humans in general, consider phenotypic traits that present their health and body symmetry. The pattern of constraints on female reproduction is consistent with human life-history and across all populations.

A difficulty in studying human reproductive success is its high variability. Every person, male or female, is different, especially when it comes to reproductive success and also fertility. Reproductive success is determined not only by behavior (choices), but also physiological variables that cannot be controlled.

In human males of advanced age (≥40 years), infertility is associated with a high prevalence of sperm DNA damage as measured by DNA fragmentation. DNA fragmentation was also found to be inversely correlated with sperm motility. These factors likely contribute to reduced reproductive success by males of advanced age.

The Blurton-Jones 'backload model' "tested a hypothesis that the length of the birth intervals of !Kung hunter-gatherers allowed women to balance optimally the energetic demands of child bearing and foraging in a society where women had to carry small children and foraged substantial distances". Behind this hypothesis is the fact that spacing birth intervals allowed for a better chance of child survival and that ultimately promoted evolutionary fitness. This hypothesis goes along with the evolutionary trend of having three areas to divide up one's individual energy: growth, maintenance, and reproduction. This hypothesis is good for gaining an understanding of "individual-level variation in fertility in small-scale, high fertility, societies( sometimes referred to by demographers as 'natural-fertility' populations". Reproduction success is hard to study as there are many different variables, and a lot of the concept is subject to each condition and environment.

== Natural selection and evolution ==
To supplement a complete understanding of reproductive success or biological fitness it is necessary to understand the theory of natural selection. Darwin's theory of natural selection explains how the change of genetic variation over time within a species allows some individuals to be better suited to their environmental pressures, finding suitable mates, and/or finding food sources than others. These individuals then have a reproductive advantage. Over time those same individuals pass on their genetic makeup onto their offspring and therefore the frequency of this advantageous trait or gene increases within that population.

The same may be true for the opposite as well. If an individual is born with a genetic makeup that makes them less suited for their environment, they may have less of a chance of surviving and passing on their genes and therefore may see these disadvantageous traits decrease in frequency. This is one example of how reproductive success as well as biological fitness is a main component of the theory of Natural Selection and Evolution.

== Evolutionary trade-offs ==
Throughout evolutionary history, often an advantageous trait or gene will continue to increase in frequency within a population only due to a loss or decrease in functionality of another trait. This is known as an evolutionary trade-off, and is related to the concept of pleiotropy, where changes to a single gene have multiple effects. From Oxford Academic, "The resulting 'evolutionary tradeoffs' reflect necessary compromises among the functions of multiple traits". Due to a variety of limitations like energy availability, resource allocation during biological development or growth, or limitations of the genetic makeup itself means that there is a balance between traits. The increase in effectiveness in one trait may lead to a decrease in effectiveness of other traits as result.

This is important to understand because if certain individuals within a population have a certain trait that raises their reproductive fitness, this trait may have developed at the expense of others. Changes in genetic makeup through natural selection is not necessarily changes that are either just beneficial or deleterious but are changes that may be both. For example, an evolutionary change over time that results in higher reproductive success at younger ages might ultimately result in a decrease in life expectancy for those with that particular trait.
