= Allomothering =

Infant care not performed by the mother

Allomothering, allomaternal infant care/handling, or non-maternal infant care/handling is performed by any group member other than the mother. Alloparental care is provided by group members other than the genetic father or the mother and thus is distinguished from parental care. Both are widespread phenomena among social insects, birds and mammals.

Allomothering comprises a wide variety of behaviors including: carrying, provisioning, grooming, touching, nursing (allonursing), and protecting infants from predators or conspecifics. Depending on age-sex composition of groups, alloparents, helpers or "handlers" can be non-reproductive males in polyandrous systems, reproductive or non-reproductive adult females, young or older juveniles, or older brothers or sisters helping to raise their younger siblings.

== Non-human primates ==
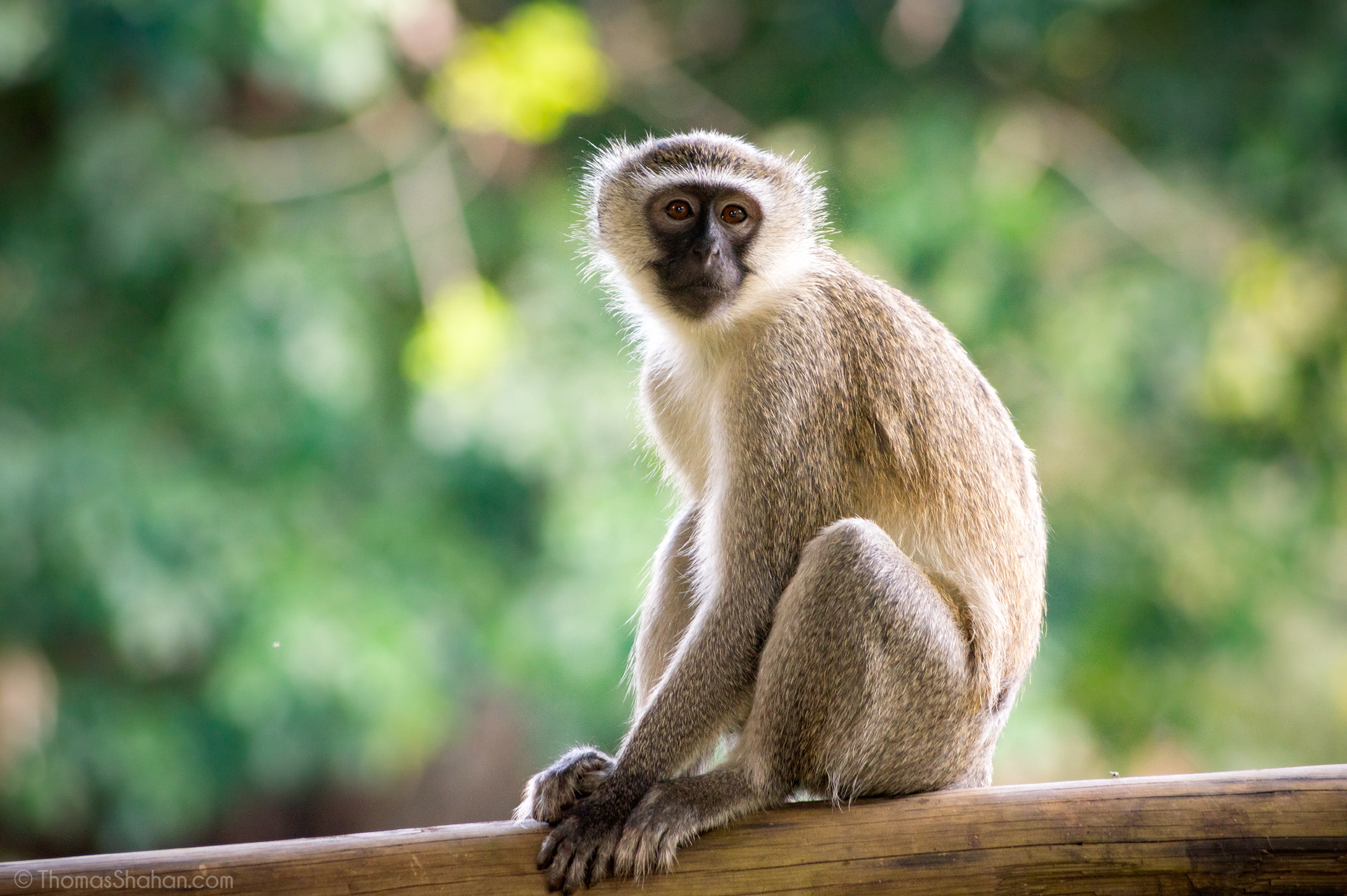
Vervet monkeys (Chlorocebus pygerythrus) practice alloparenting

The term allomother first appeared in a sociobiological analysis of reproductive strategies among langur monkeys and referred to group members other than the mother who share care of infants. Allomothering turns out to be common across the primate order and occurs in vervets, cebus monkeys, squirrel monkeys, various macaques, New World monkeys and prosimians as female or male group members assist the mother by carrying or guarding infants from predators, and in some New World monkeys such as tamarins and marmosets, helping to provision them.

Allomaternal care varies greatly across and within different species, families, subfamilies, and groups of primates. Mothers within the same group often vary significantly in the amount of access they allow allomothers. Differing levels of allomaternal care are present in almost 75% of primate species for which there is data and among 100% of callitrichids. Allomaternal care by adult males is most often provided in species in which there is a relatively high degree of paternity certainty, such as within pair living species. However, unrelated adult males have been observed to provide allomaternal care as in fat-tailed dwarf lemurs and Barbary macaques.

The majority of allomaternal care in group living primate species is provided by females and juveniles. Juveniles are often older siblings, but do not necessarily provide allomaternal care exclusively to their siblings. Allomothering is most common in species with close female relationships and relaxed female dominance hierarchies.

=== Number of allomothers ===
The number of allomothers involved in the allomaternal care of a single infant varies by species. In hanuman langurs, infants receive allomaternal care from most of the females within the group, while in capped langurs, one adult female typically acts as the primary allomother for an infant.

=== Infant's age ===
The age at which infants receive care from allomothers also varies greatly by species. Research on wedge-capped capuchins has found that infants receive no allomaternal care during the first three months of their lives, and they receive the greatest amounts of allomaternal care between the ages of four and six months. However, potential allomothers show interest and investigate infants who are under three months old. Alternatively, research on wild capped langurs found that infants spent about one-third of their time with a single allomother during their first month of life, and after this point, time engaged in allomaternal care declined. Wild Formosan macaque infants receive the highest rates of allomaternal handling between the ages of four and seven weeks, and allomaternal care rates decrease greatly between 20 and 24 weeks of age.

=== Infant's sex ===
There is evidence that some primate species differentially provide allomaternal care based on the infant's sex. This sex-bias in allomaternal care is noted in wild Formosan macaques. In a study of this species, adult females participated in higher rates of allomaternal care with female infants than with male infants, while juvenile females engaged in higher rates of allomaternal care with male infants than with female infants.

=== Allonursing ===
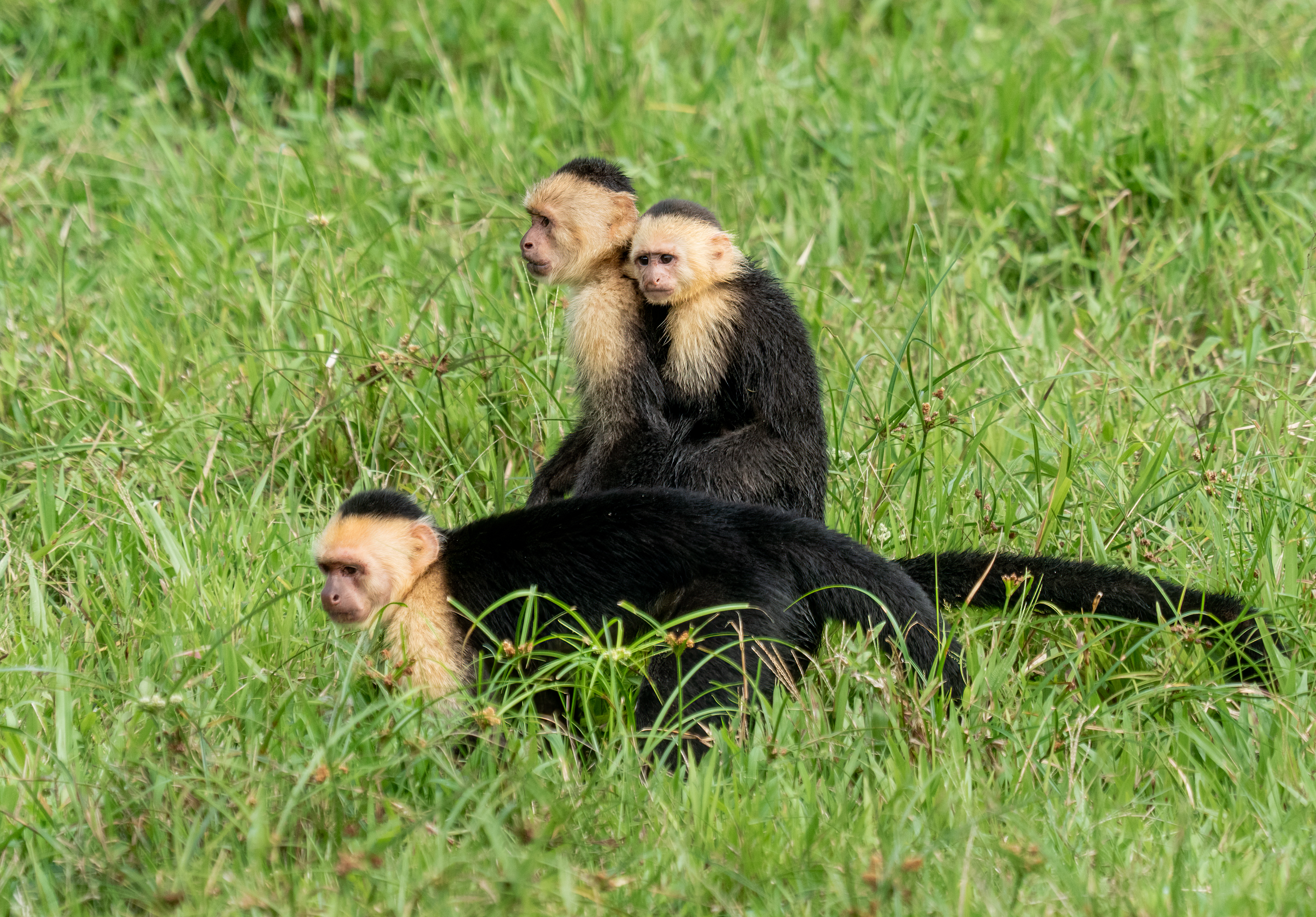
Capuchin monkeys, like the Panamanian white-faced capuchins (Cebus imitator), allonurse infants that are not their own

Capuchin monkey females have been known to regularly nurse (allonurse) infants who are not their own (cf. wet nurse). In these species allonursing is performed by related and unrelated females. Moreover, about 10% of nursing bouts are attributed to allonursing. Allonursing is a widespread, though infrequent, behavior among female wedge-capped capuchins. Allomothering can also be performed by non-reproductive helpers like in the callitrichids (marmosets and tamarins).

=== Cooperative breeding ===
In the callitrichids, allomothering care goes beyond that of many other species and infants are spontaneously provisioned by all group members without a prior begging call on the part of the infants. These species practice facultative cooperative breeding, where a single dominant female reproduces and other group members (fathers, other males and non-reproductive juveniles) provide the majority of care to the infants.

=== Cognitive and socialization implications ===
Many studies have shown that cooperative breeding and allomothering provide significant benefits for the development, learning, and socialization of offspring. Primates that are cooperative breeders exhibit behavioral elements including territory and group defense, caution, and transference of offspring between different individuals. The cooperative group protects offspring and members physically and provides or shares food through transferring offspring between different individuals. Researchers believe that there are cognitive abilities underpinning these cooperative behaviors that enable individuals to help others. These behavioral elements also lead to the enhancement of other cognitive abilities, especially those that are related to social interactions.

Some studies have suggested that evolutionary pressures may have formed the behavioral elements and even some morphological traits of infants in cooperative breeding species. One possible pressures is the need for infants to develop social skills that enable them to form strong bonds with multiple caregivers, as this can increase their chances to manipulate caregivers to help them survive. Distinctive vocalizations (or other communicative cues) in offspring can also help infants communicate with their caregivers, and may have developed from the need to do so.

Cooperative breeding may have led to the evolution of greater cognitive flexibility and problem-solving abilities in infants. In this hypothesis, navigating complex social situations with multiple caregivers requires a high level of cognitive ability from the infant, including skills like understanding and responding to social cues, communicating effectively, and solving problems. These skills may be useful in other social situations rather than just in infant/alloparent relationships, and current studies addressing this relationship emphasize the need for further research. For example, in current comparative research on different species of primates, it is shown that cooperative-breeder species like callitrichids, due to their greater social tolerance and sensitivity to others' signals, may perform better on tasks requiring social learning, communication, and alliance-making than their independently reproducing sister taxa (for example, squirrel monkeys).

Another important cognitive ability related to sociality and cooperative breeding is prosociality. Comparative studies argue that cooperative breeding in nonhuman primates leads to cognitive changes that increase prosociality and enhance social cognition. These prosocial behaviors are not seen in nonhuman primates that are independent breeders.

Research on prosociality discusses “shared intentionality” as an individual's capacity to share mental representations of goals and intentions with others based on the understanding of basic mental states. Consequently, this capability allows individuals to cooperate with each other and coordinate their actions. Particularly in humans, the characteristics related to shared childcare are thought to contribute to advanced cognitive skills including language, planning, cumulative culture, and intentional teaching. These characteristics are rare in other animals, and require complicated interaction between cognitive development and social behavior.

== Proposed explanations ==
Multiple explanations have been proposed for the adaptive value of allomaternal care and who benefits from it: the mother, the infant, or the allomother.

=== Kin selection hypothesis ===
Older siblings promote their own genetic fitness via helping their younger siblings, which is explained by the inclusive fitness theory. Offspring of the same parents are, on average, genetically as equally close to their siblings as they would be to their own offspring. Under kin selection theory, related allomothers may improve their inclusive fitness if the allomothering behaviour contributes to the infant's survival or a faster reproductive rate for the mother, since this will increase the related allomother's genetic success. In captive vervet monkeys research found that juveniles were most likely to provide allocare to an infant sibling or the infant of a high ranking mother. In wedge-capped capuchins, the degree of relatedness best predicts allomaternal interactions. Female siblings are the most likely to act as allomothers to infants. However, kin selection does not account for all allomaternal behavior since non-kin subadults and females often provide allocare. Young females with siblings may simply have more opportunities to care for related infants.

=== Learning to mother hypothesis ===
Jane Lancaster noted that there are reproductive benefits for primates as k-strategists in learning to be better mothers, or acquiring mothering skills. Her learning-to-mother hypothesis postulates that primate females with no children of their own participate in allomothering more frequently than expected, and evidence from studies by Sarah Hrdy and Lynn Fairbanks supports this hypothesis. However, experienced and pregnant mothers may also benefit from mothering practice.

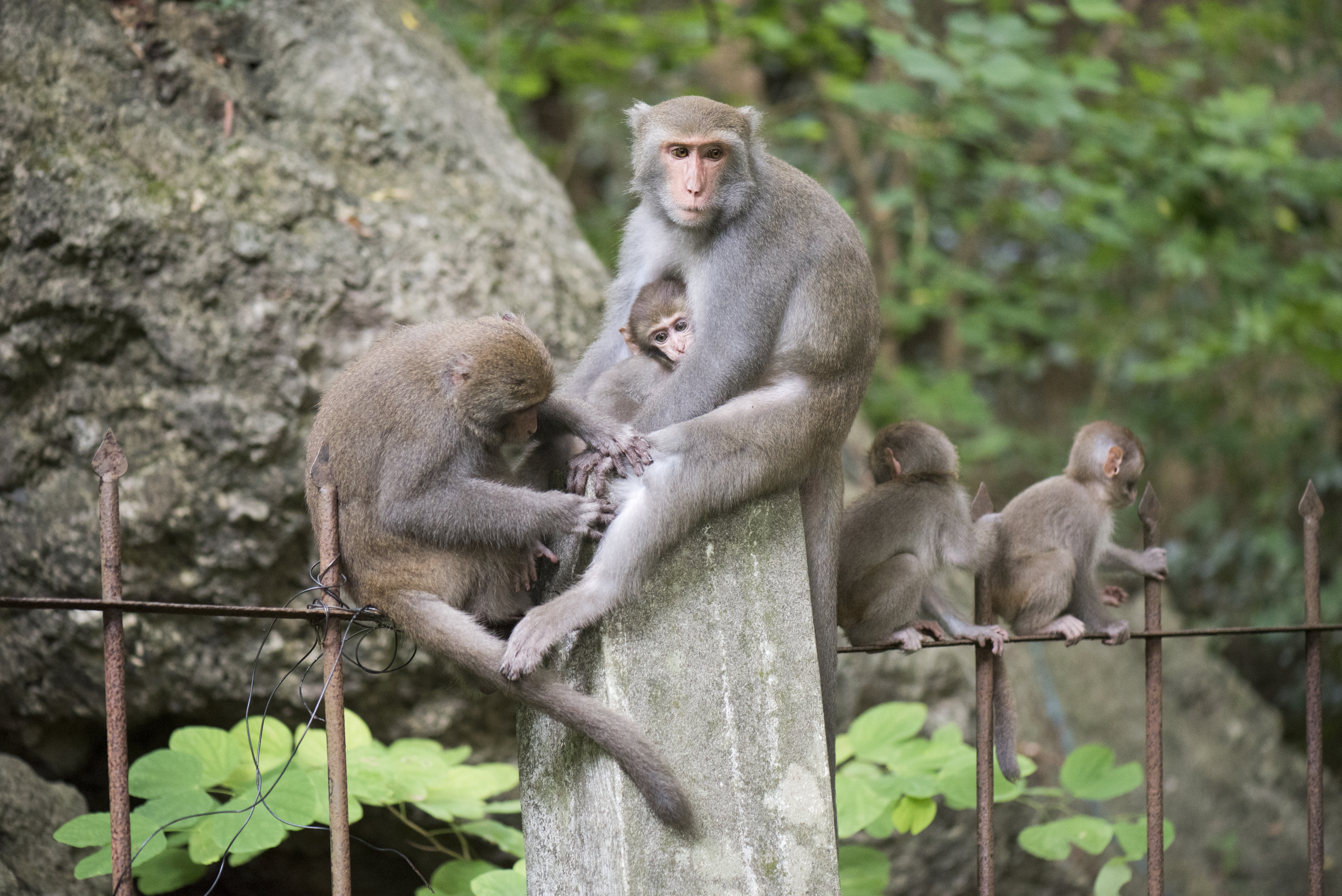
Formosan rock macaque (Macaca cyclopis) females show similar rates of allomaternal care for individuals that have given birth and those that have not

The hypothesis is supported by evidence of the success of allomothering as a learning technique. First time mothers have high rates of infant mortality, but the rate is reduced for females who engaged in allomaternal behavior as juveniles prior to the birth of their first offspring. Therefore more experience in alloparenting as a juvenile corresponds with greater reproductive success for the female. Allomothers may face energetic, social, and reproductive costs, but potentially benefit by learning how to parent and practicing parenting skills which results in higher survival rates for their first born offspring. The benefit to the allomother may, however, be potentially costly to the infant and its mother. This hypothesis is disputed by evidence such as the observation that in wild Formosan rock macaques both nulliparous and multiparous adult females engage in similar rates of allomaternal care.

=== Alliance formation hypothesis ===
Another hypothesis explaining allomothering includes "alliance-formation", where subordinate allomothers endeavour to form social alliances with dominant mothers by interacting with their infants. Infants may also gain valuable social skills by interacting with allomothers. Infants may form social-alliances of their own, and improve their chances of having future dispersal partners. This is especially apparent in some species of colobine Old World monkeys where relationships are generally built less around kinship (as compared to cercopithecine old world monkeys). In colobines, allomaternal care may allow infants to form social networks and relationships that are separate from their mother's relationships. Allomaternal care may also be a form of reciprocal altruism between females in a group. In some cases, allomothering may also improve the chances for an infant to be adopted by another resident female should the mother die.

=== Byproduct hypothesis ===
Another explanation for allomaternal behavior may be that is a byproduct of selection for maternal behavior, and that there is no specific adaptive value to allomaternal care. This theory is supported by observations that females who provide allomaternal care more often also end up being better mothers, so these females may simply be predisposed to care for infants. However, this hypothesis would not explain the high levels of allocare seen by juvenile, subadult, and unrelated adult males in many primate species.

=== Reproductive fitness hypothesis ===
An infant's birthmother, in a climate of allomothering, may gain time relieved from parental duties which can provide her with energetic advantages by allowing her to reduce levels of maternal care and expend less energy carrying her infant, and by allowing her to forage more efficiently. These energetic benefits may allow the mother to gain direct fitness benefits as she may be able to reproduce more quickly (i.e. reduce her inter-birth interval) due to allomaternal care providing her with the ability to more quickly invest in physical preparation for her next offspring. A reduction in inter-birth interval and a subsequent increase in the mother's reproductive rate may ultimately increase her lifetime reproductive success. Infants may also benefit from their mother's more effective feeding and allomaternal care through a faster maturation and growth rate or earlier weaning time (at a younger age but not at a lower weight).

== Malicious allomothering behavior ==
Allomothering care may not always be beneficial. In some cases, "aunting-to-death" has been reported, where females withhold an infant from their mother until the infant dies, which can be explained either as incompetence or as competition in favor of the aunts' own offspring. In other cases, infants may be kidnapped and receive life-threatening injuries from a supposed alloparent.

Little allomaternal care has been observed in cercopithecine old world monkeys and great apes. However, some cercopithecine species including vervet monkeys, patats monkeys, and talapoins exhibit high levels of allomaternal care. In some other cercopithecine species, allomaternal care is present, but restricted to older infants.

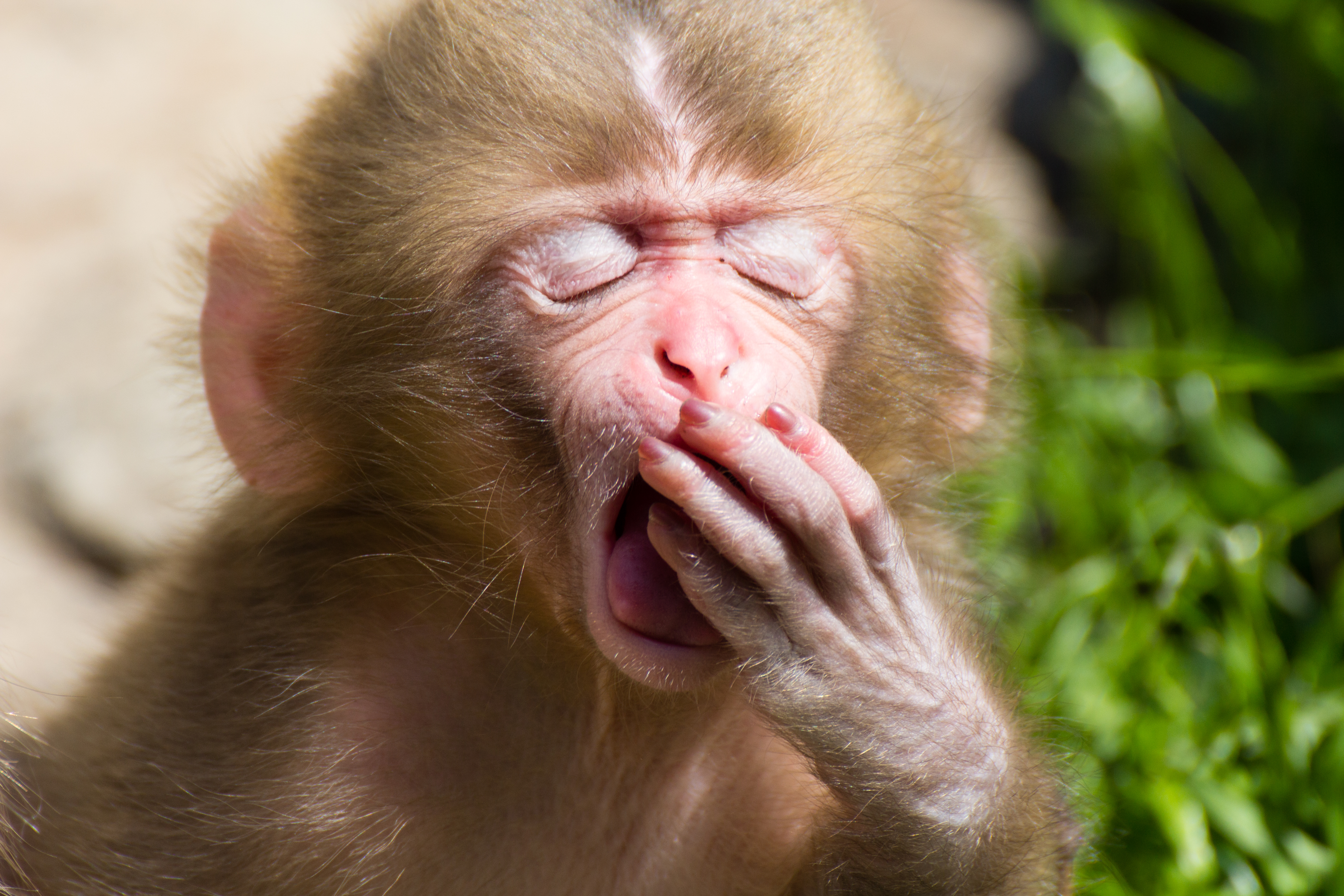
Japanese macaque (Macaca fuscata) mothers restrict other females from handling infants

In most cercopithecine species and in great apes, mothers have near constant contact with their young infants. The amount of allowed allomaternal care may depend on the risk to the infant. Potential cercopithecine allomothers tend to be interested in infants, so in these species, allomaternal care is limited by restrictions by an infant's mother. Indeed, mothers restrict conspecifics' attempts to handle their infants when the risk of injury or death is high (for example a resident-nepotistic cercopithecine species like the Japanese macaque).

Non-lactating females in some cercopithecine monkey species may refuse to return an infant to its lower-ranking mother, which ultimately results the infant starving to death. This behavior is especially notable in species with rigid female dominance hierarchies (conversely in species without a strict hierarchy, the mother can always retrieve the infant from others).

In some species of cercopithecine monkeys, multiparous females, especially those who have infants or are pregnant, can be aggressive to infants that are not their own. Evolutionarily, kidnapping and aggression may reduce reproductive competition between females. This behavior makes allocare riskier.

=== Diet and the relationship to allomothering ===
The two cercopithecoid subfamilies illustrate how diet and feeding competition may impact social structure and whether a species allows allomothering. Colobines are folivorous herbivores that exhibit a large degree of dietary flexibility. These dietary patterns are hypothesized to have contributed to law intra-group scramble competition, allowing for high levels of social interaction and a relaxed female dominance hierarchy in which female/female competition is low. Such a system enhances the benefits and reduces the costs of allomaternal care, which allows for its evolution in colobine species.

In contrast to the colobines, cercopithecine species are generally omnivorous and engage in high levels of competition within their groups for food. These factors may have influenced the formation of more rigid female dominance hierarchies. Such primate social systems reduce the benefits and increase the cost of allomaternal care, which may help explain why allomothering is rare in most cercopithecine species. These factors may explain why infant mishandling and infanticide are generally more common in cercopithecines.

=== Allomothering in apes ===
Similar to cercopithencine monkeys, apes may refuse to share infants due to fears for their safety. Chimpanzee infants are at risk of being killed by infanticidal males (for reproductive access to the mother) and females (for greater access to resources). Moreover, young alloparents might not be experienced enough to successfully protect the infant from such threats. Females typically leave their natal groups, so available allomothers are usually non kin.

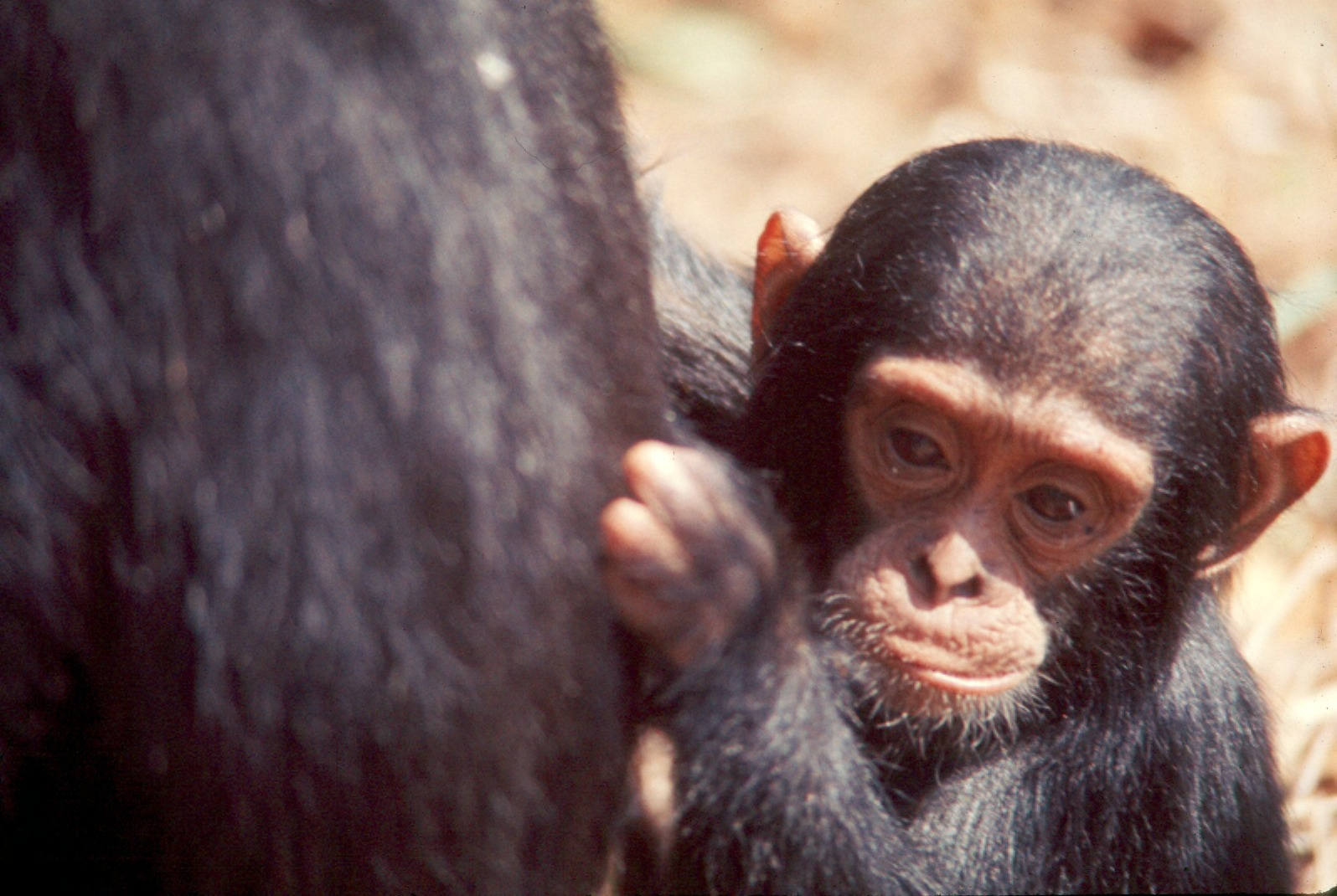
Chimpanzees (Pan troglodytes) may avoid allomothering but within groups experienced mothers may allow sibling alloparental care

However, research on wild chimpanzees at Ngogo, Uganda observed allomothering with some individuals. They found significant variation on rates of allomothering within the group. Experienced mothers allowed more allomothering, perhaps because siblings often acted as allomothers. Allomaternal care in chimpanzees provides mothers with reproductive benefits; infants who received more allomaternal care nursed less frequently, and so their mothers lactated less. Longer periods between nursing due to allomaternal care led to reduced lactation and faster infant weaning, but not increased infant mortality, and faster return of ovulation for mothers. The mothers were able to reduce their inter-birth intervals and thereby increase their reproductive success.

However, mothers with previous offspring wean their infants faster, so reduced weaning time may be due to experience, or mothers with previous offspring may produce more nutritious milk, and the noted differences in weaning time may not be connected to allomaternal care.

== See also ==
- Broodiness
- Paternal care
