= Challenge hypothesis =

Sociobiological hypothesis

The challenge hypothesis outlines the dynamic relationship between testosterone and aggression in mating contexts. It proposes that testosterone promotes aggression when it would be beneficial for reproduction, such as mate guarding, or strategies designed to prevent the encroachment of intrasexual rivals. The positive correlation between reproductive aggression and testosterone levels is seen to be strongest during times of social instability. The challenge hypothesis predicts that seasonal patterns in testosterone levels are a function of mating system (monogamy versus polygyny), paternal care, and male-male aggression in seasonal breeders.

The pattern between testosterone and aggression was first observed in seasonally breeding birds, where testosterone levels rise modestly with the onset of the breeding season to support basic reproductive functions. However, during periods of heightened male aggression, testosterone levels increase further to a maximum physiological level. This additional boost in testosterone appears to facilitate male-male aggression, particularly during territory formation and mate guarding, and is also characterized by a lack of paternal care. The challenge hypothesis has come to explain patterns of testosterone production as predictive of aggression across more than 60 species.

== Patterns of testosterone ==
The challenge hypothesis presents a three-level model at which testosterone may be present in circulation. The first level (Level A) represents the baseline level of testosterone during the non-breeding season. Level A is presumed to maintain feedback regulation of both GnRH and gonadotropin release, which are key factors in testosterone production. The next level (Level B) is a regulated, seasonal breeding baseline. This level is sufficient for the expression of reproductive behaviors in seasonal breeders and the development of some secondary sex characteristics. Level B is induced by environmental cues, such as length of day. The highest level (Level C) represents the physiological testosterone maximum and is reached through social stimulation, such as male-male aggression. The challenge hypothesis proposes that social stimulation which leads to this rise in testosterone above breeding baseline serves to increase the frequency and intensity of aggression in males, particularly for competing with other males or interacting with sexually receptive females.

=== In birds ===
It is thought that testosterone plays an integral part of the territorial behavior within bird species, in particular the fluctuation of testosterone mitigated by luteinizing hormone (LH) during different seasons. Generally, mating behavior is demonstrated in the spring and accordingly, male birds show a sharp increase in LH as well as testosterone during this time. This acute rise in LH and testosterone can be attributed to the increased need for aggressive behaviors. The first need for aggressive behavior comes from the drive to establish territory. This typically occurs within the first few weeks of mating season. The second need for aggression occurs after the first clutch of eggs have been laid. The male not only needs to guard the eggs, but also to guard his sexually receptive mate from other potential suitors. Thus, the male adopts an "alpha male status" when acquiring territory as well as during the egg laying period. This alpha male status, as mentioned before, comes from the significant increase of testosterone that occurs during the mating season. Further evidence of LH and testosterone mitigating aggression in bird species comes from studies on bird species such as the song sparrow and the European blackbird who build highly accessible refuges, known as open cup nests.

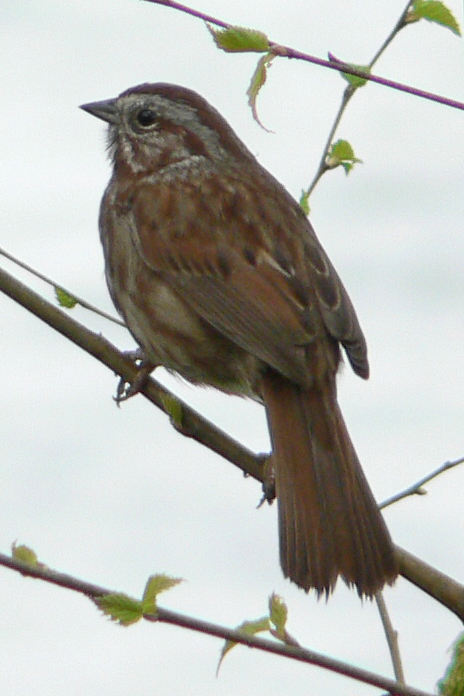
Song sparrow

Because open cup nests can essentially be built anywhere, there is little competition when it comes to nest building sites. Accordingly, both the song sparrow and the European blackbird do not show an increase in luteinizing hormone or testosterone during territory acquisition . However, not all species of birds show increased levels of testosterone and LH during aggressive behavior. In a landmark study, it was found that male western screech owls, when exposed to another male during the non-mating season showed aggressive behavior without the increase in LH and testosterone. However, when the owls were put in a situation that warranted aggressive behavior during the mating season, there was a large spike in LH and testosterone during the aggressive act. This suggests that the mechanisms of aggressive behavior during the mating and non-mating seasons are independent of each other or perhaps the increase in testosterone somehow increases the aggressive response during the mating season. Estradiol (E2), a type of non gonadal estrogen, seems to play a key role in regulating aggressive behavior during the non-mating season in several species of birds. As previously noted, many bird species during the non-mating season have low testosterone levels yet still manage to display aggression. As a primary example, when the Washington State song sparrow, a bird which shows fairly high levels of aggression during non-mating season despite low testosterone, is exposed to fadrozole, an aromatase inhibitor, the levels of aggression are greatly decreased. When the E2 was replaced, the aggressive behaviors reestablished themselves thus confirming that E2 governs aggressive behavior during the non-mating season. It is unknown however if this is just specific to birds, or if this extends to other animal species.

These examples all culminate in a challenge hypothesis model which focuses on the role of testosterone on aggression in the breeding season. The challenge hypothesis most likely cannot be applied to the non-breeding season since, as mentioned above, there is most likely a mechanism independent of testosterone governing aggression in the non-mating season. A sigmoidal relationship between testosterone plasma levels and male-male aggression is observed under the challenge hypothesis when the birds' testosterone levels were above seasonal breeding testosterone baseline levels. If birds remained at the seasonal breeding baseline levels during the breeding season, then there is not a significant difference observed in male-male aggression. In addition, there is a negative, sigmoidal relationship between testosterone levels in the birds and the amount of parental care provided when parents are above the seasonal breeding testosterone baseline levels. As such, the relationship between testosterone plasma levels and male-male aggression is context-specific to the species. Figure 2 and 3 describe the relationships observed of many single- or double-brooded bird species, from male western gulls to male turkeys.

=== In other animals ===
The challenge hypothesis has been used to describe the testosterone levels in other species to certain social stimuli. The challenge hypothesis predicts the testosterone influence on aggressive male-male interactions between male northern fence lizards. This reinforces the challenge hypothesis by showing rapid changes in aggressive behaviors of the lizards do not correlate with testosterone concentrations. Yet, over the mating season, the intensity of the behavior and the levels of testosterone levels yielded a positive correlation. Research has also shown the challenge hypothesis applies to specific monogamous fish species, with a greater correlation in species with stronger pair bonding.

In addition, the challenge hypothesis has been adapted to primate species. In 2004, Martin N. Muller and Richard W. Wrangham applied a modified challenge hypothesis to chimpanzees. Similar to the original hypothesis, they predicted that there would be increased male-male aggressive interaction when a receptive and fertile female chimpanzee was present. Muller and Wrangham also correctly predicted the testosterone levels of more dominant chimpanzees to be higher as compared to lower status chimpanzees. Therefore, chimpanzees significantly increased both testosterone levels and aggressive male-male interactions when receptive and fertile females presented sexual swellings. This study also highlighted how male testosterone and aggression levels rise only when males are in the presence of parous females. This is because nulliparous females are less attractive to males, and they are not guarded, meaning there is little competition. This evidence suggests that the increase in testosterone is related to only aggression – not sexual activity – as male chimpanzees mate equally with both parous and nulliparous females. Currently, no research has specified a relationship between the modified challenge hypothesis and human behavior, yet, many testosterone/human behavior studies support the modified hypothesis applying to human primates.

== Cornerstones ==
=== Mating effort versus parenting effort ===
A fundamental feature of male life history is the tradeoff between the energy devoted to male-male competition and mate attraction (mating effort) versus that allocated to raising offspring (parenting effort). There is a trade off because decreased paternal effort caused by increased testosterone dramatically decreases reproductive success, due to decreased parental care and protection for the offspring. Therefore, to maximise reproductive success, the optimal balance between the two must be found. The challenge hypothesis proposes testosterone as the key physiological mechanism underlying this tradeoff. When the opportunity to reproduce arises—namely, the species enters the breeding season or females enter estrus—males should exhibit a rise in testosterone levels to facilitate sexual behavior. This will be characterized by increased mating effort and decreased parenting effort, as investment in the former may be incompatible with parental care due to insufficient time and energy to engage in all of these facets of reproductive effort.

Research on nonhuman species has found that testosterone levels are positively associated with mating effort and negatively related to parenting effort. Moreover, experimental manipulations have revealed a causal role of testosterone, such that elevations in testosterone result in increased mating effort and decreased parenting effort.

==== Paternal care ====
The challenge hypothesis makes different predictions regarding testosterone secretion for species in which males exhibit paternal care versus those in which males do not. When aggressive interactions among males arise in species that exhibit paternal care, testosterone levels are expected to be elevated. Males are predicted to exhibit an increase in testosterone to Level C (physiological maximum), but only during periods of territory establishment, male-male challenges, or when females are fertile so that paternal care is not compromised. When aggression is minimal, specifically during parenting, testosterone levels should decrease to Level B (breeding baseline). Level B represents the minimal levels of testosterone required for the expression of reproductive behaviors, and is not expected to drastically interfere with parenting behavior.

In species where males exhibit minimal to no paternal care, testosterone levels are hypothesized to be at Level C throughout the breeding season because of intense and continued interactions between males and the availability of receptive females. In polygynous species, where a single male tends to breed with more than one female, males generally do not exhibit a heightened endocrine response to challenges, because their testosterone levels are already close to physiological maximum throughout the breeding season. Experimental support for the relationship between heightened testosterone and polygyny was found, such that if testosterone was implanted into normally monogamous male birds (i.e., testosterone levels were manipulated to reach Level C) then these males became polygynous.

=== Mating Effort versus Maintenance ===
There is a broader trade-off to consider when it comes to the challenge hypothesis: maintenance vs reproductive effort. Reproductive effort includes both mating and parental effort. In order to gain the benefits of reproductive effort, individuals have to suffer the costs of testosterone, which can hinder their physiological maintenance. This is a form of life history tradeoff, due to the fact that natural selection favors reproductive success rather than maintenance. Therefore, the ability to find the correct balance between reproductive effort and maintenance would have been positively selected for by natural selection, leading to the physiological and social behaviour we now know as the challenge hypothesis.

One such cost is that increased aggressive activity due to high levels of testosterone is hypothesised to expose males to increased predation, which not only endangers them, but also their offspring. A study on the lizard Sceloporus jarrovi, supported this prediction, as those with induced high levels of testosterone for extended periods of time had a higher mortality rate than those with lower levels of testosterone. Prolonged high levels of testosterone have also been seen to suppress the immune system, with evidence ranging from human natural experiments to male-ring-tailed lemurs. Maintaining high levels of testosterone is energetically expensive, which can hinder reproductive success when a male frequently finds himself in aggressive and physically demanding situations. Due to increased aggression as a result of high testosterone levels, individuals expose themselves to higher injury risk than usual.

Therefore, the costs of maintaining a high testosterone level may outweigh increased reproductive success. A study on male ring-tailed lemurs (Lemur catta) supports the idea of a compromise between costs and benefits of increased testosterone levels, as increased levels were tightly timed around days of female estrus. This shows that there is an optimum length of time to have high testosterone levels when considering the costs and benefits.

=== Male-male aggression ===
It has long been known that testosterone increases aggressive behavior. While castration tends to decrease the frequency of aggression in birds and replacement therapy with testosterone increases aggression, aggression and testosterone are not always directly related. The challenge hypothesis proposes that testosterone is most immediately related to aggression when associated with reproduction, such as mate-guarding. An increase in male-male aggression in the reproductive context as related to testosterone is strongest in situations of social instability, or challenges from another male for a territory or access to mates.

The relationship between aggression and testosterone can be understood in light of the three-level model of testosterone as proposed by the challenge hypothesis. As testosterone reaches Level B, or breeding baseline, there is minimal increase in aggression. As testosterone increases above Level B and approaches Level C, male-male aggression rapidly increases.

== Continuous breeders ==
The challenge hypothesis was established based upon data examining seasonal breeders. There are many species, however, who are continuous breeders—namely, species that breed year-round and whose mating periods are distributed throughout the year (e.g., humans). In continuous breeders, females are sexually receptive during estrus, at which time ovarian follicles are maturing and ovulation can occur. Evidence of ovulation, the phase during which conception is most probable, is advertised to males among many non-human primates via swelling and redness of the genitalia.

Support for the challenge hypothesis has been found in continuous breeders. For example, research on chimpanzees demonstrated that males became more aggressive during periods when females displayed signs of ovulation. Moreover, male chimpanzees engaged in chases and attacks almost 2.5 times more frequently when in groups containing sexually receptive females.

=== Implications for humans ===
The predictions of the challenge hypothesis as applied to continuous breeders partially rests upon males' ability to detect when females are sexually receptive. In contrast to females of many animal species who advertise when they are sexually receptive, human females do not exhibit cues but are said to conceal ovulation. While the challenge hypothesis has not been examined in humans, some have proposed that the predictions of the challenge hypothesis may apply.

Several lines of converging evidence in the human literature suggest that this proposition is plausible. For example, testosterone is lower in fathers as compared to non-fathers, and preliminary evidence suggests that men may be able to discern cues of fertility in women. The support for the challenge hypothesis in non-human animals provides a foundation for which to explore the relationship between testosterone and aggression in humans.

== The Dual Hormone Hypothesis as an Extension of the Challenge Hypothesis ==
The challenge hypothesis claims that there is an association between testosterone and aggression in mating contexts, and more broadly status-seeking behaviours. However, findings linking testosterone to status-seeking behaviours, especially in humans, are often inconsistent and leave room for critique. In some cases, testosterone has been seen to positively correlate with status-seeking behaviours such as aggression and competitiveness, however, testosterone has also been found to have weak or even null correlations with the same behaviours. Some scholars blame these inconsistencies on limitations in study methods, but the dual-hormone hypothesis has emerged as a theoretical explanation to some of these inconsistencies.

=== Dual-Hormone Hypothesis ===
Stress plays a fundamental role in competition and mating, and therefore, the hormones released in response to stress should be considered as well as testosterone when looking at the challenge hypothesis. Cortisol is produced in the hypothalamic-pituitary-adrenal gland and is released when one is under physical or psychological stress; this is relevant to the challenge hypothesis as testosterone-linked status-seeking interactions are often stressful situations.

According to the dual-hormone hypothesis, the correlation between testosterone levels and aggression/status-seeking behaviour is reliant on corresponding cortisol levels; there is a strong correlation between the two when cortisol levels are low, and a weaker or sometimes reversed correlation when cortisol levels are high. There is supporting evidence for this relationship from a study done on humans, which looked at social status, leadership, and aggression. Cortisol is seen as a moderator of the relationship between testosterone and status-seeking/reproductive aggression in this hypothesis.

However, the dual-hormone hypothesis also has its own flaws, and current evidence appears to only partially support the hypothesis, according to a meta-analytical evaluation in 2019 by Dekkers et al. A proposed reasoning for the occasional weak evidence is that cortisol and testosterone, further interact with social context and individual psychology to regulate status-seeking behaviours. One such context is 'victory-defeat', where testosterone and cortisol will interact to increase desire to compete again more after losing than winning, as a method of regaining social status. Individual personality also has an effect on the interaction between cortisol and testosterone, and studies have shown that the cortisol x testosterone interaction was statistically significant for only those with high disagreeableness and high emotional instability.

== See also ==
- Paternal care
