= Primate sociality =

Aspect of primatology

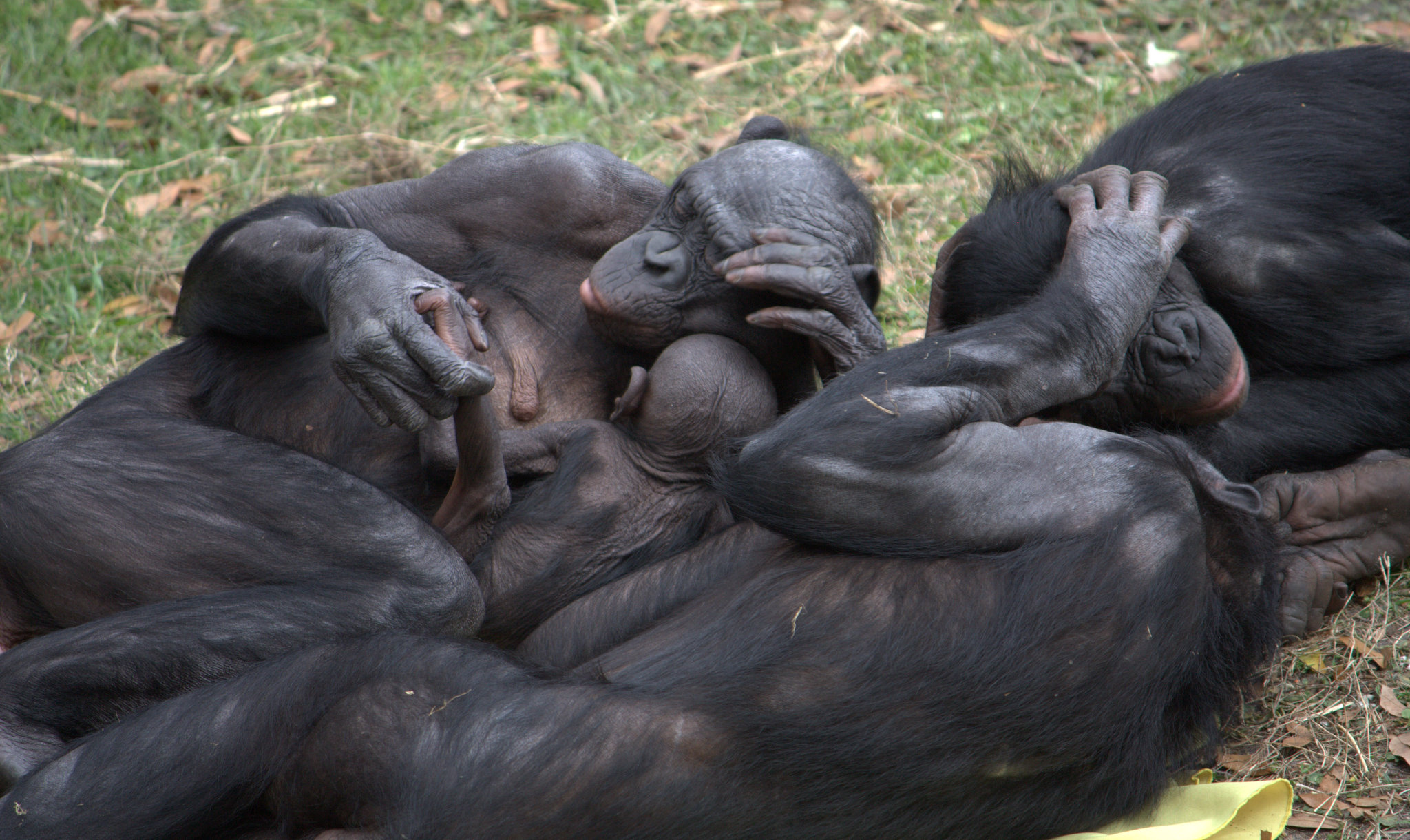
Primate sociality. Group of bonobos relaxing and grooming.

Primate sociality is an area of primatology that aims to study the interactions between three main elements of a primate social network: the social organisation, the social structure and the mating system. The intersection of these three structures describe the socially complex behaviours and relationships occurring among adult males and females of a particular species. Cohesion and stability of groups are maintained through a confluence of factors, including: kinship, willingness to cooperate, frequency of agonistic behaviour, or varying intensities of dominance structures.

Primate social organisation exists along a spectrum, with networks ranging from the solitary neighbourhood systems to the multi-individual units to the complex multilevel societies that are composed of hierarchically-organised social units. The evolution of diverse primate social systems is considered to be a naturally selected anti-predation response. Increased resource detection, cooperation and social learning are also considered as co-benefits of group living.

== Emergence of group living ==
Similar to genetic traits, behavioural characteristics can similarly result from natural selection processes. In opposition to many animal-decision making strategies which encourage individual fitness, group living (or sociality) prioritises an inclusive group fitness. Socioecological factors are thought to influence primate social organisation. For example, the main benefits of group living are hypothesised to be:

- Improved predator detection. Predator vigilance (or awareness) and predator defence are thought to increase with group living. More eyes means detection will occur sooner, communication among members will ensure appropriate responses and actions are taken, minimising the primates' susceptibility to predation.
- Improved resource (water or food) detection. The hypothesis is that more individuals infer a heightened spatial knowledge and an increased ability to detect resources if more landscape is being covered.
- Opportunity for cooperation. Primate sociality and living in close proximity bolsters cooperative behaviours necessary for participating in activities such as hunting, alloparenting, and/or territory or mate defence.
- Reduced risk of infanticide. There have been observations from certain baboon populations that suggest a correlation between infant survival and group size: e.g. infants are likelier to survive in larger groups.
- Increased opportunity for social learning.

The main constraining factors of social group sizes are related to:

- Resource abundance. Because living in groups requires members to share access to essential resources (like food, water, mates, sleeping sites) there are selective costs that constrain group size.
- Pathogen transmission. Larger groups increases exposure to pathogens among its members.
- Competition and aggression. If intra-group competition becomes too high, the associated stress can potentially impose negative health impacts.
- Cognitive capabilities. There is an assumption that cognitive abilities must be able to interpret the complex information of group living (including information resulting from social relationships).

Interestingly, there are competing hypotheses for the role feeding takes in influencing primate sociality. It is interpreted as having both as a positive (resource detection) and negative (resource competition) effect depending on the analysis.

In order for sociality to have been selected for via natural selection, the collective benefits of group living must outweigh the collective costs. Thus, if intra-group competition becomes too great, the group is likely to fracture into smaller units. A thorough review of the literature suggests that the lower threshold of primate group living is determined by risk of predation while the upper limit of group size is determined by feeding competition among individuals.

== Primate social organisation ==
Social organisation refers to the size (number of individuals), composition (variation between the sexes), and cohesion (relating to proximity and bond strengths among individuals) of the society in consideration. The synchronisation of individuals, or lack thereof, also provides insight into relationships among individuals. There are seven types of primate social organisations identified in the literature (discussed below), including: solitary primate systems, pair-bonded systems, one-male-multi-female systems, one-female-multi-male systems, multi-male-multi-female systems, fission fusion societies, and multilevel societies. Interestingly, primate social organisation is not necessarily species-specific. For instance, an example of within species (intra-species) variation would be tamarins and marmosets. These two primates are part of the callitrichidae family and have been observed to demonstrate pair-bonding systems in some populations while others have one-male unit (OMU) systems.

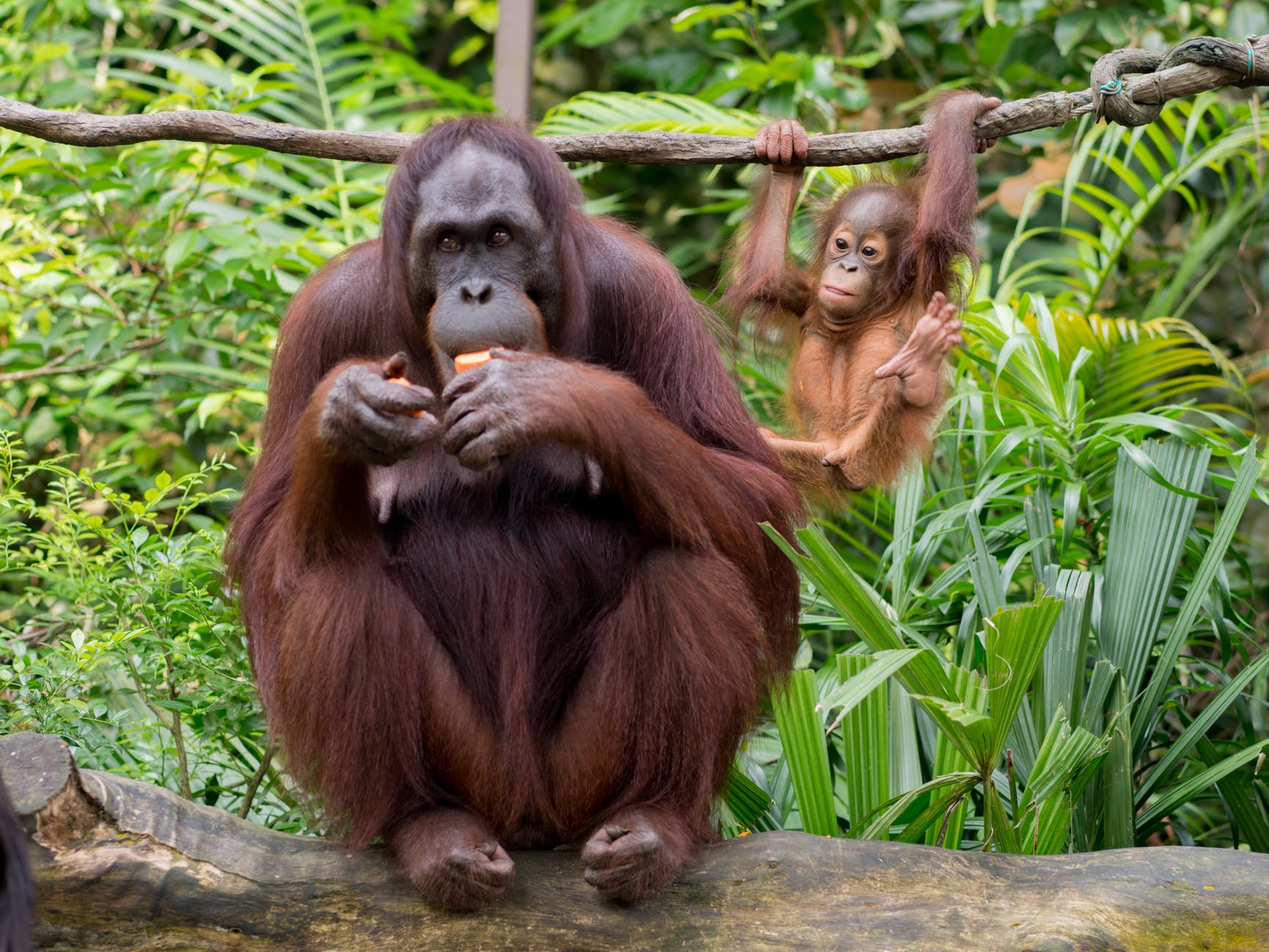
Solitary female orangutan (Pongo) with her offspring.

Solitary primate systems, sometimes referred to as neighbourhood systems, occur when an adult male's territory overlaps with one (or more) adult female's territory and individuals conduct activities (most often foraging or offspring care) independently from one another. In this system, solitary does not imply antisocial, but rather behaviour is characterised by this lack of synchronisation among the individuals. In fact, many solitary primates maintain social networks by using vocal or olfactory signals to communicate.

Examples of solitary primates: orangutans, galagos, lorises, some species of lemurs, some tarsiers

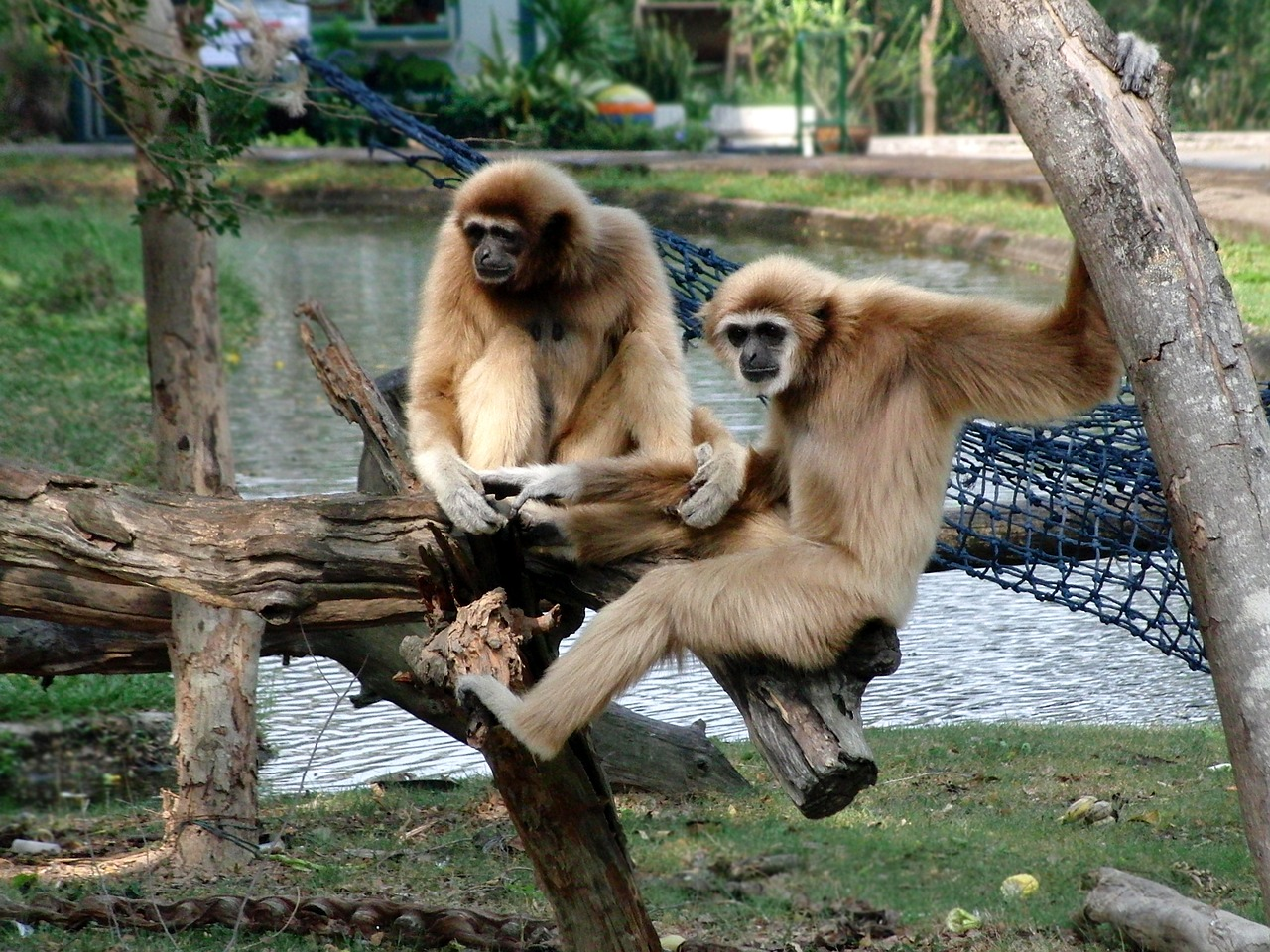
Lar gibbon (Hylobates lar) pair-bond.

Pair-bonded systems, or pair-living primates, are small social units consisting of one adult male and one adult female, and their immature offspring. There are factors of time and space that define this type social system. Firstly, pair-bonds must demonstrate a long-term affiliative partnership for at least one year or one seasonal cycle. Secondly, there must also be a higher frequency of association (spatial proximity) between the bonded-pair individuals than there is with other individuals.

Paternal care of offspring is a relatively uncommon trait in primate social systems; however, the monogamous mating system often observed (though it should not be assumed) in pair-bonding generates an equal variance for offspring success for both pair members. Thus, paternal involvement in off-spring rearing is much likelier to be observed in primate species where pair-living occurs.

Examples of pair-bonded primate species: titi monkeys, owl monkeys, some species of marmosets and tamarins, many species of siamangs and gibbons

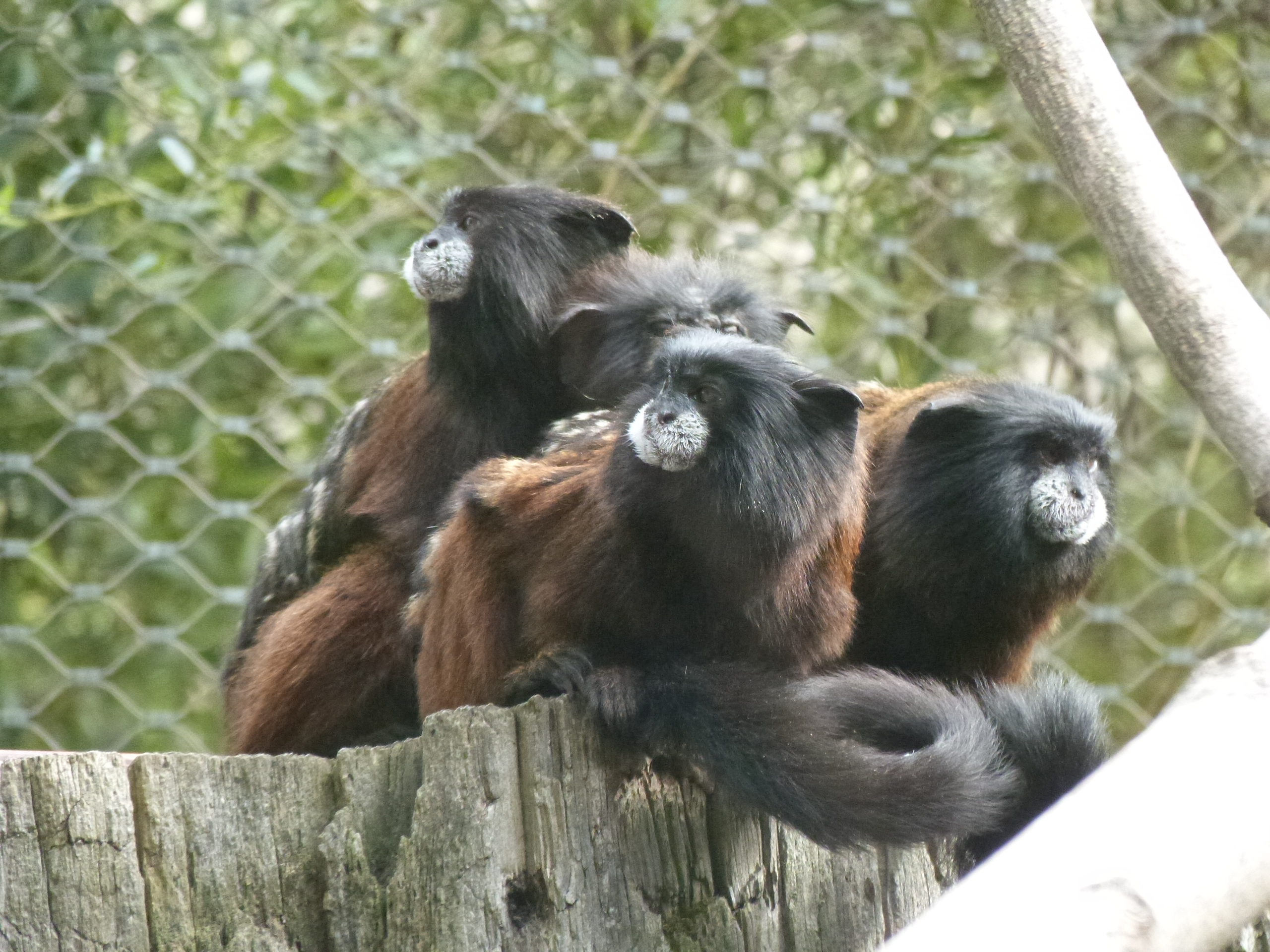
Group of saddle-back tamarins (Saguinus fuscicollis).

One-female-multi-male groups are composed of one reproductive adult female and two or more adult male partners in the group. If there are other associated females within the group, they will likely have their reproductivity suppressed either via agonistic behaviours (aggressive and submissive interactions) or olfactory signals (such as pheromones). This social system promotes cooperative breeding (or alloparenting), where the non-breeding individuals assist in providing care for the off-spring produced by the main breeding female.

Examples of one-female-multi-male structured primate species: many species of tamarin and marmoset

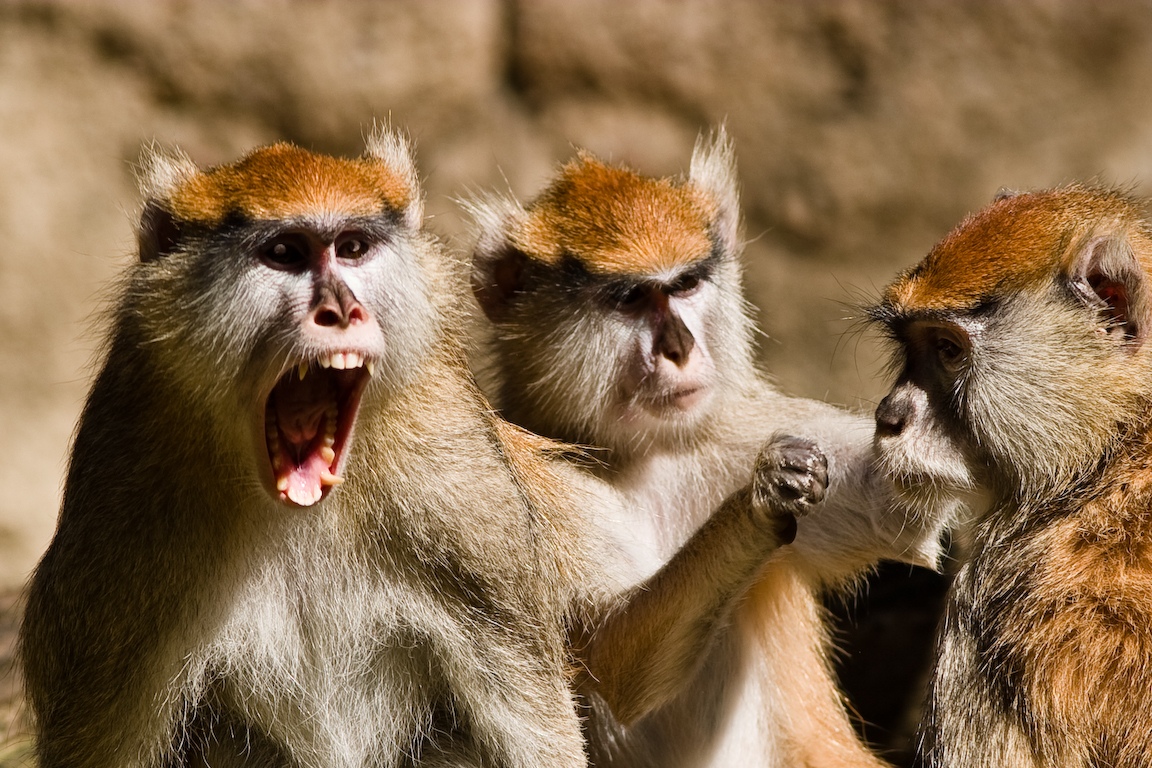
Group of patas monkeys (Erthrocebus patas).

One-male-multi-female groups are usually characterised by a single resident male who defends a group of (often related) adult females against males from outside the group. While tenure ship is held, this form of social organisation allows a male exclusive access to reproductive females for breeding purposes. A resident male often suffers challenges from extra-group males (perhaps belonging to all-male bachelor groups) whereby these males may attempt takeovers with the goal of gaining sole access to the reproductive females. A takeover by a new resident male could lead to infanticide (infant killing). This behaviour is interpreted as a strategic attempt to bring females back into estrous, which allows mating opportunities to occur sooner for the new resident male.

Examples of one-male-multi-female structured primate species: some species of gorillas, numerous colobine and guenon species, patas monkeys, howler monkeys

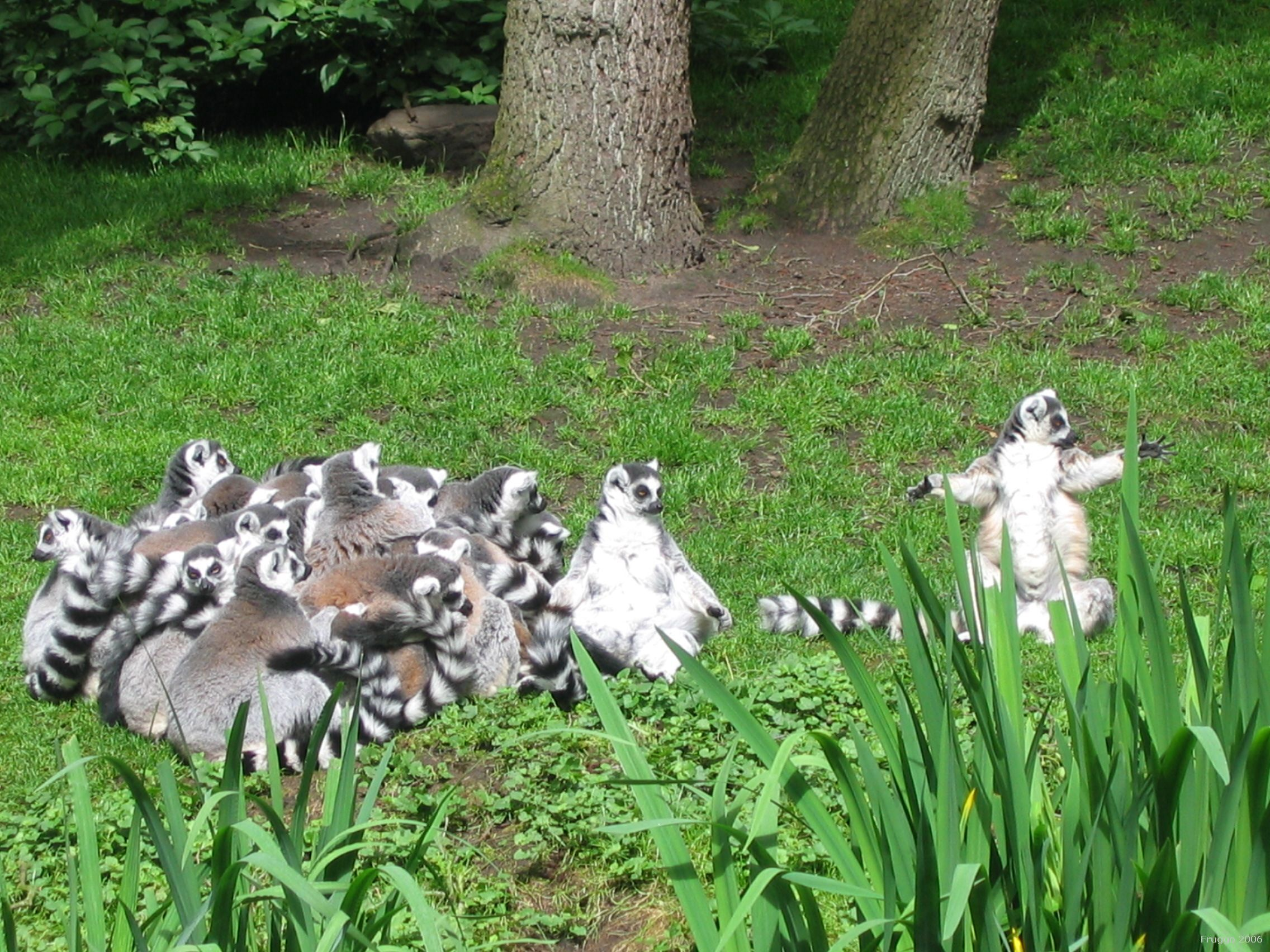
Multi-male-multi-female group of ring-tailed lemurs (Lemur cata)

Multi-male-multi-female social systems are characterised by associations between larger numbers of individuals forming groups. Since individuals are able to mate with multiple partners, paternity is often hidden or skewed which helps ensure the survival of off-spring. A variety of social relationships and bonds exist among multi-male-multi-female group members. For instance, some research has led to observations of dyadic relationships, or friendships. These friendships are more moderate forms of the pair-bonded social structures, existing within the multi-male-multi-female system. For instance, one study of savannah baboons (Papio cynocephalusI) observed that the lactating females in the group would more closely associate with specific adult males. As further research is conducted on primate friendships, three main benefits have been hypothesised: close associations with a specific male (1) tends to discourage infanticide, (2) tends to reduce incidence of harassment of the female, and (3) stimulates paternal investment and care in the offspring. The benefits of friendships within the multi-male-multi-female group systems demonstrate similar advantages as pair-bonded systems.

Examples of multi-male-multi-female structured primate species: many species of macaques, baboons, vervet monkeys, mangabeys, capuchins, squirrel monkeys, woolly monkeys, some colobine species, some lemurs (ring-tailed and sifaka).

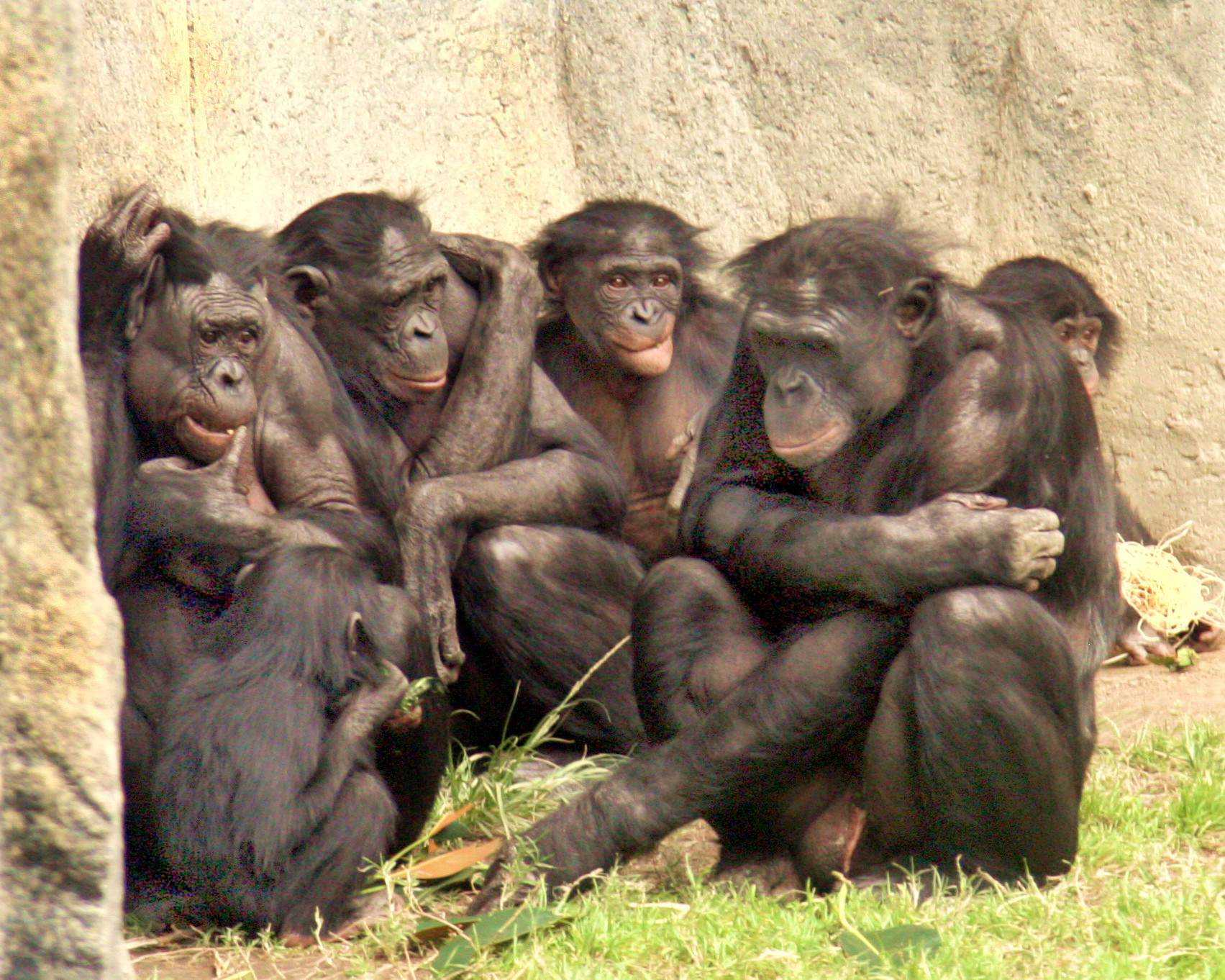
Group of bonobos (Pan paniscus)

Fission fusion societies demonstrate a high degree of fluidity by splitting (fission) and merging (fusion) as the group moves across a landscape. This type of organisation is less cohesive than multi-male-multi-female groups, with patterns often reflecting the local availability of resources. For instance, if foraging patch sizes are small, the larger group will often break apart to forage and later merge in order to sleep. This type of society is typically characterised by female philopatry, where female kin lineages make up the core of the groups and males disperse to other groups. Interestingly, some researchers hypothesise that fission fusion societies may have been socially inherited from the last shared common ancestor of humans, chimpanzees and bonobos.

Examples of primate species with fission fusion societies: humans, chimpanzees, bonobos, spider monkeys

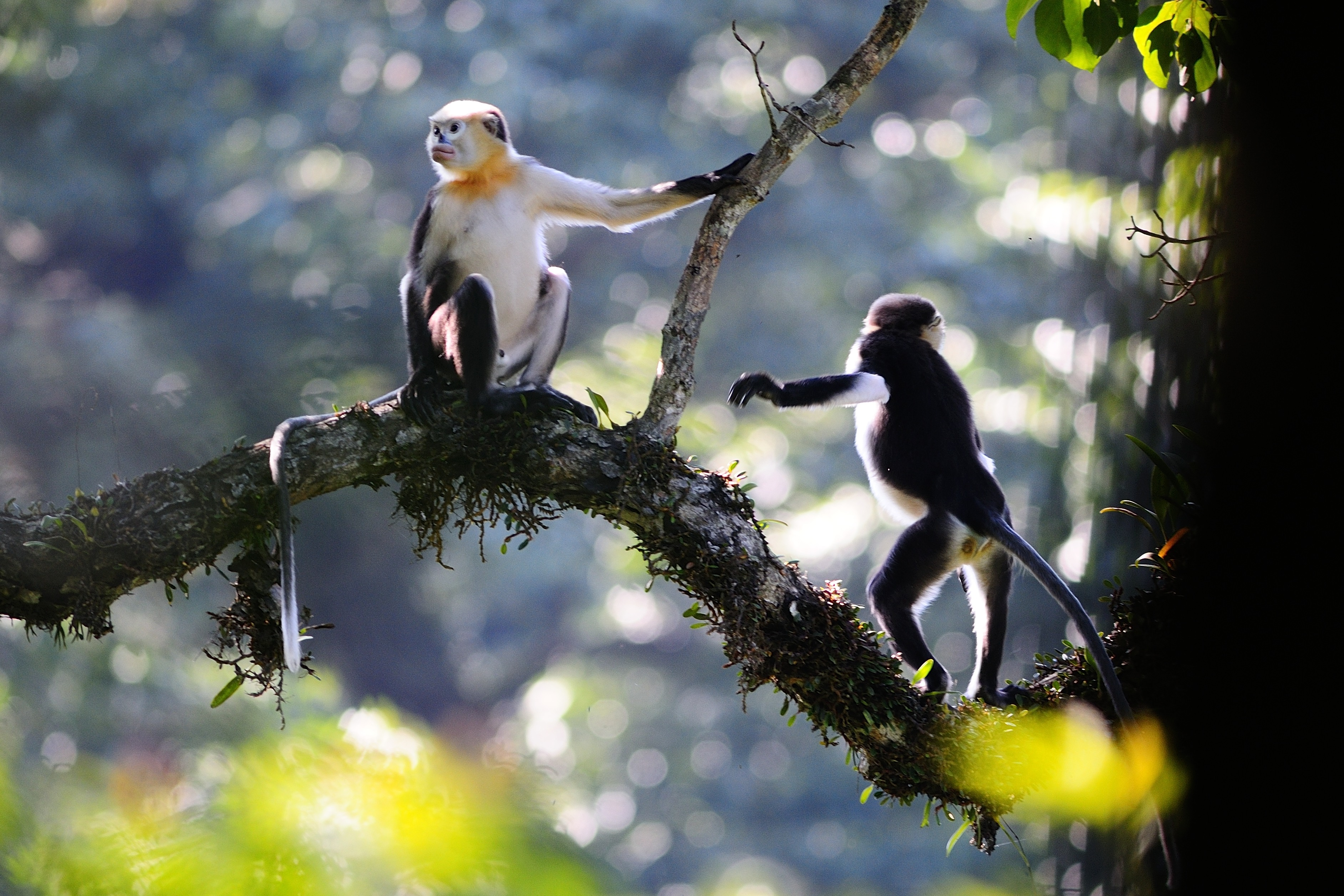
Tonkin snub-nosed monkeys (Rhinopithecus avunculus)

Multilevel societies, sometimes referred to as hierarchical or modular societies, are the largest and most complex form of primate social organisation. Social stratification of these societies is discrete and has at least one stable core unit. Typically, multilevel societies are composed of between two and four levels of social structures: one-male units (OMUs, or harems) nested within clans, which are nested within bands, which are nested within a troop. OMUs are composed of a single-male breeding unit (a leader male), several females, and may even have a follower male. Similar to the resident male of a one-male-multi-female group, the OMU leader male is susceptible to takeovers by outside adult males. In some species, there is an additional level to the society: clans. The clan level is nested between the OMU and the band level. Clans consist of OMUs and of all-male units (AMUs) of bachelor males (either kin-related or not). Finally, a band is a coalesced grouping of OMUs who routinely sleep and forage together. The troop is a temporary aggregation of bands who might also forage or sleep in the same sites depending on environmental constraints.

While multilevel societies might seem similar to fission fusion societies, they are not. Fission fusion societies have a dynamic element with routine variability whereas multilevel societies maintain stability through the hierarchy of core units. In order to fully understand how these complex societies function, it is important to observe social relationships and their interactions not only within tiers, but between them as well. Modular systems are considered to be an evolutionary construct resulting from the need to split up larger groups, whether they are large multi-male-multi-female groups or an amalgamation of closely related units.

Examples of primate species with multilevel societies: hamadryas baboons, geladas, snub-nosed monkeys

== Primate social structures ==
Primate social structures are meant to describe the diverse relationships that exist between individuals, as well as the patterns of interactions that define them. Researchers hypothesize that environmental and social pressures have allowed for a whole array of inter-individual (between individuals) relationships that promote inclusive group fitness.

Inter-individual relationships are thought to be influenced by sex-related variables and can occur (1) between females, (2) between males or (3) between members of the opposite sex. Factors influencing inter-female relationships are primarily thought to be: food competition; group size; and dispersal patterns. These three elements will characterize the degree of competition among female group members. For instance, in a female philopatric society there are often stable kin-based hierarchies that develop. Conversely, in male philopatric species or egalitarian societies, females regularly transfer between groups (eliminating the potential for hierarchies or coalitions) leading to female bonding as a sole mechanism for resource defence against other groups. Inter-male relationships tend to be characterized by agonism and competition over access to females. Socioecological theory predicts that fierce competition exists among male group members over access to females, leading to higher frequencies of agonistic interactions being common. Some species of primates demonstrate male-male relationships leading to alliances and affiliative behaviors when inclusive group fitness is being prioritized over individual fitness. Finally, intersexual relationships (between adult male and adult female individuals) are also shaped by a number of factors, including sexual selection, dispersal patterns, dominance structures, certainty of paternity, risk of infanticide and/or the level of sexual dimorphism that is present within a species.

Affinity and affiliation between individuals is often largely determined by the dispersal patterns characterizing a primate social system. For instance, chimpanzees (Pan troglodytes) have patrilineal social systems, where the males usually remain in their natal groups and the females emigrate into neighboring groups. Conversely, in the matrilineal societies of bonobos (Pan paniscus), it is the females who remain in their natal groups and the males who disperse to new groups. Dispersal patterns will also likely affect the structure or organization of social hierarchies.

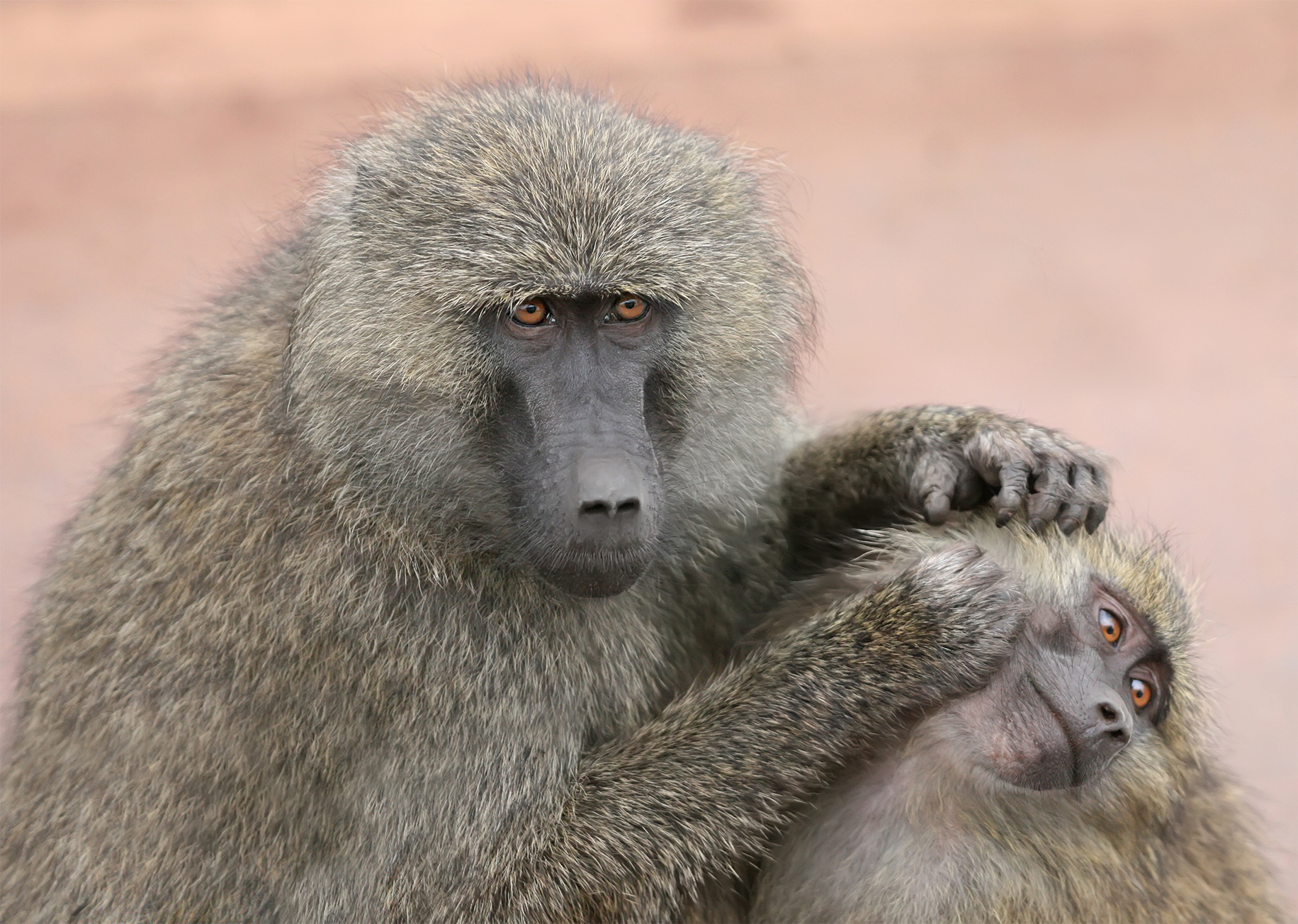
An adult monkey, the Olive Baboon (Papio anubis), grooms a kid at the Ngorongoro conservation Area in Tanzania.

There are also affiliative behaviors which encourage stronger associations among individuals over time. Close proximity, grooming and non-aggressive social interactions are expected characteristics of well-bonded primates. Grooming is a multifunctional behavior. Firstly, it is practical. Grooming allows the opportunity for unwanted dirt, dead skin, debris or ectoparasites to be removed from an individual's hair or fur. Moreover, it is a social activity. Grooming helps initiate new relationships and maintain existing ones; it can be used to deflate aggressive social interactions; and, it is beneficial to an individual's health since grooming has been linked to reductions in stress.

Agonistic interactions, or agonism, refers to the frequency and degree of aggressive and submissive interactions occurring between individuals. The frequency at which individuals are being subjected to agonistic interactions could be related to factors such as rank (there is evidence of both high- and low-ranking individuals being targets of conspecific harassment) or dispersal patterns (non-resident individuals attempting to emigrate into other groups can often be at higher-risk of harassment from resident group members).

Primate social systems and their organisation exist across a spectrum. While some systems reflect a strict dominance hierarchy, others are characterised by more egalitarian structures. A confluence of variables and behaviours, such as diet or dispersal patterns, are thought to shape social systems. Many forms of social hierarchies exist in primate systems. In resident-nepotistic intolerant hierarchies, the stable hierarchy is based on kinship and rank can be linearly traced, as it is inherited. In contrast, in resident-nepotistic-tolerant hierarchies, stability is maintained via inter-individual coalitions and tolerance by dominant individuals. In this system, power is not ultimate; it is partially mitigated by cooperation among subordinate individuals. Another form of dominance structure is related to age. For example, some gorillas demonstrate an age-graded dominance structure: wherein the eldest male member is the highest-ranking dominant male (or alpha).

== Primate mating systems ==
Primate mating systems infer both a social element and a genetic element. Therefore, a mating system should describe: (1) the interactions and resulting relationship between the mating pairs involved; and (2) the reproductive outcomes from the mating system. For instance, monogamy infers exclusive mating access and, thus, greater paternity certainty. Observed mating systems in primates include: monogamy, polyandry, polygyny and polygamy (as described below).

Monogamy, or a monogamous mating system, is when one adult male and one adult female have a preferential partner for copulation. There is a long-term temporal element to this category of mating system (longer than one year or one seasonal cycle) and offspring resulting from this mating system will belong to the pair. Additionally, there is an assumption that each member in this partnership have relatively equal likelihood for successfully reproducing.

Though strict monogamy is rare in nature, some primate bonded pairs demonstrate monogamous (or partially monogamous) mating systems. In some monogamous pair-bonded species there have been observations of extra-pair copulations, wherein a male or female member and a partner of the opposite sex, other than the so-called mate, have been witnessed mating.

Polyandry, or a polyandrous mating system, is when one reproductive adult female mates with two or more different adult males. In this mating system, the adult males mate exclusively with the adult female.

Polygyny, or a polygynous mating system, is when one adult male mates with two or more adult females. It is the most common type of mating system in observed in primate studies. Polygyny can occur as a result of spatial constraints where solitary males are able to defend access to nearby solitary females. Another pattern reflects a scramble competition, wherein adult males roam the landscape in search of sexually receptive females, moving on shortly after mating. Harem-polygyny occurs when a single adult male defends access to multiple females in order to gain exclusive mating access. Finally, groups of males might form coalitions in order to successfully defend mating access to females.

Polygamy, or a polygamous mating system, is when both males and females mate with two or more partners. In this mating system offspring paternity might remain unknown.
