= Paternal care =

Parental investment provided by a male to his own offspring

In biology, paternal care is parental investment provided by a male to his own offspring. It is a complex social behavior in vertebrates associated with animal mating systems, life history traits, and ecology. Paternal care may be provided in concert with the mother (biparental care) or, more rarely, by the male alone (exclusive paternal care).

The provision of care, by either males or females, is presumed to increase growth rates, quality, and/or survival of the young, ultimately increasing the inclusive fitness of the parents. In a variety of vertebrate species (e.g., about 80% of birds and about 6% of mammals), both males and females invest heavily in their offspring. Many of these bi-parental species are socially monogamous, so individuals remain with their mate for at least one breeding season.

Exclusive paternal care has evolved multiple times in a variety of organisms, including invertebrates, fishes, and amphibians.

== Mammals ==
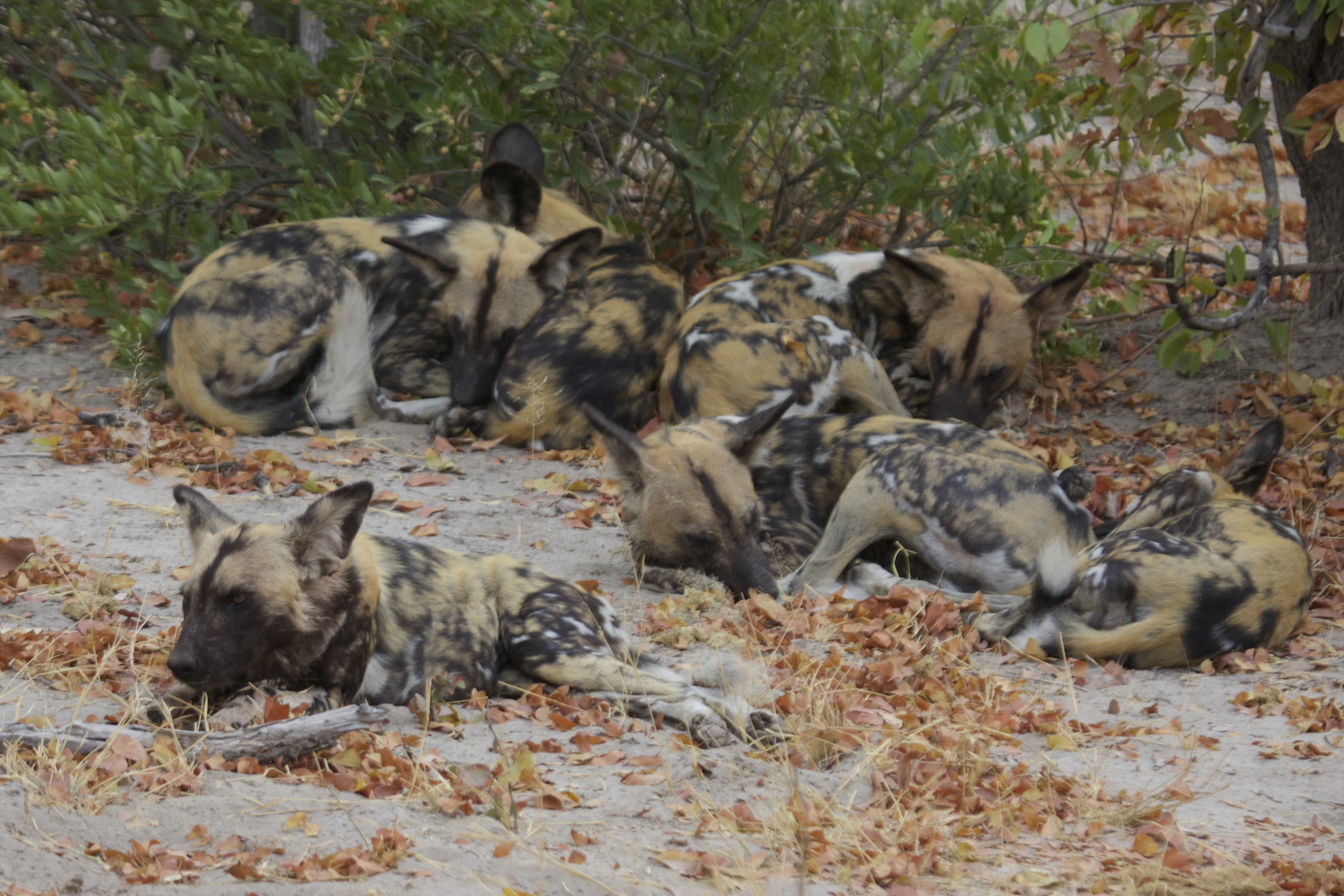
Pack of African wild dogs (Lycaon pictus), a mammal species in which males remain as care helpers.

Male mammals employ different behaviors to enhance their reproductive success (e.g., courtship displays and mate choice). However, the benefits of paternal care have rarely been studied in mammals, largely because only 5-10% of mammals exhibit such care (mostly present in primates, rodents, and canids). For species in which males provide extensive care for their offspring, indirect evidence suggests that the costs can be substantial. For example, mammalian fathers that care for their young may undergo changes in body mass and an increase in the production of various costly hormones (e.g., androgens, glucocorticoids, leptin). Nonetheless, there is evidence suggesting that across all mammals, when males carry and groom their offspring, their female partner's fecundity increases. Furthermore, if males provide for the females, their litter size tends to be larger.

=== Rodents ===
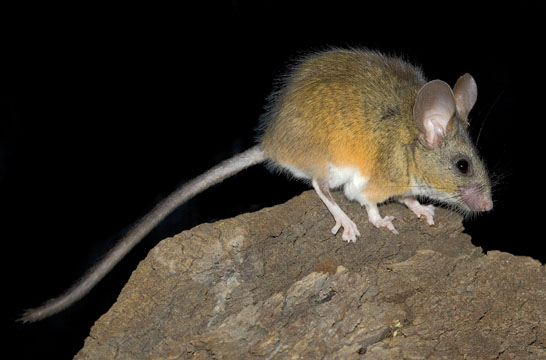
California mice (Peromyscus californicus) are well known for having intensive and sustained paternal behaviors.

Several species of rodents have been studied as models of paternal care, including prairie voles, Campbell's dwarf hamster, the Mongolian gerbil, and the African striped mouse. The California mouse is a monogamous rodent that exhibits extensive and essential paternal care, and therefore has been studied as a model organism for this phenomenon. One study of this species found that fathers had larger hindlimb muscles than those of non-breeding males. Quantitative genetic analysis has identified several genomic regions that affect paternal care.

=== Humans ===
Human cultures and societies vary widely in the expression of paternal care. Some cultures recognize paternal care via celebration of Father's Day. Human paternal care is a derived characteristic (evolved in humans or our recent ancestors) and one of the defining characteristics of Homo sapiens. Different aspects of human paternal care (direct, indirect, fostering social or moral development) may have evolved at different points in our history, and together they form a unique suite of behaviors, as compared to the great apes. One study of humans has found evidence suggesting a possible evolutionary trade-off between mating success and parenting involvement; specifically, fathers with smaller testes tend to be more involved in the care of their children.

Research on the effects of paternal care on human happiness has yielded conflicting results. However, one study concluded that fathers generally report higher levels of happiness, positive emotion, and meaning in life, as compared with non-fathers.

According to the United States Census Bureau, approximately one-third of children in the U.S. grow up without their biological father in their home. Numerous studies have documented negative consequences of being raised in a home that lacks a father, including increased likelihood of living in poverty, behavioral problems, committing crimes, spending time in prison, abusing drugs or alcohol, becoming obese, and dropping out of school.

== Non-human primates ==
In non-human primates, paternal investment often depends on the species' mating system. Mating systems influence paternity certainty and the likelihood that a male is providing care towards his own biological offspring.

Paternal certainty is high in monogamous pair-bonded species, and males are less likely to accidentally care for unrelated offspring (which would not contribute to their own genetic fitness). In contrast, the offspring paternity of polygamous primate societies may be uncertain. Males are therefore at higher risk of providing care for unrelated offspring and missing opportunities to mate, compromising their own fitness.

Male non-human primates motivated by biological paternity rely on past mating history and phenotypic matching to recognize their biological offspring.

Comparing male care efforts exhibited by the same species can provide insight on the significant relationship between a male's paternity certainty and the amount of paternal care exhibited by the male. For example, siamangs (Symphalangus syndactylus) practice both polyandrous and monogamous mating systems. It has been found that monogamous males are more likely to carry infants and contribute to parental care compared to male siamangs in promiscuous mating systems.

=== Strepsirrhines ===
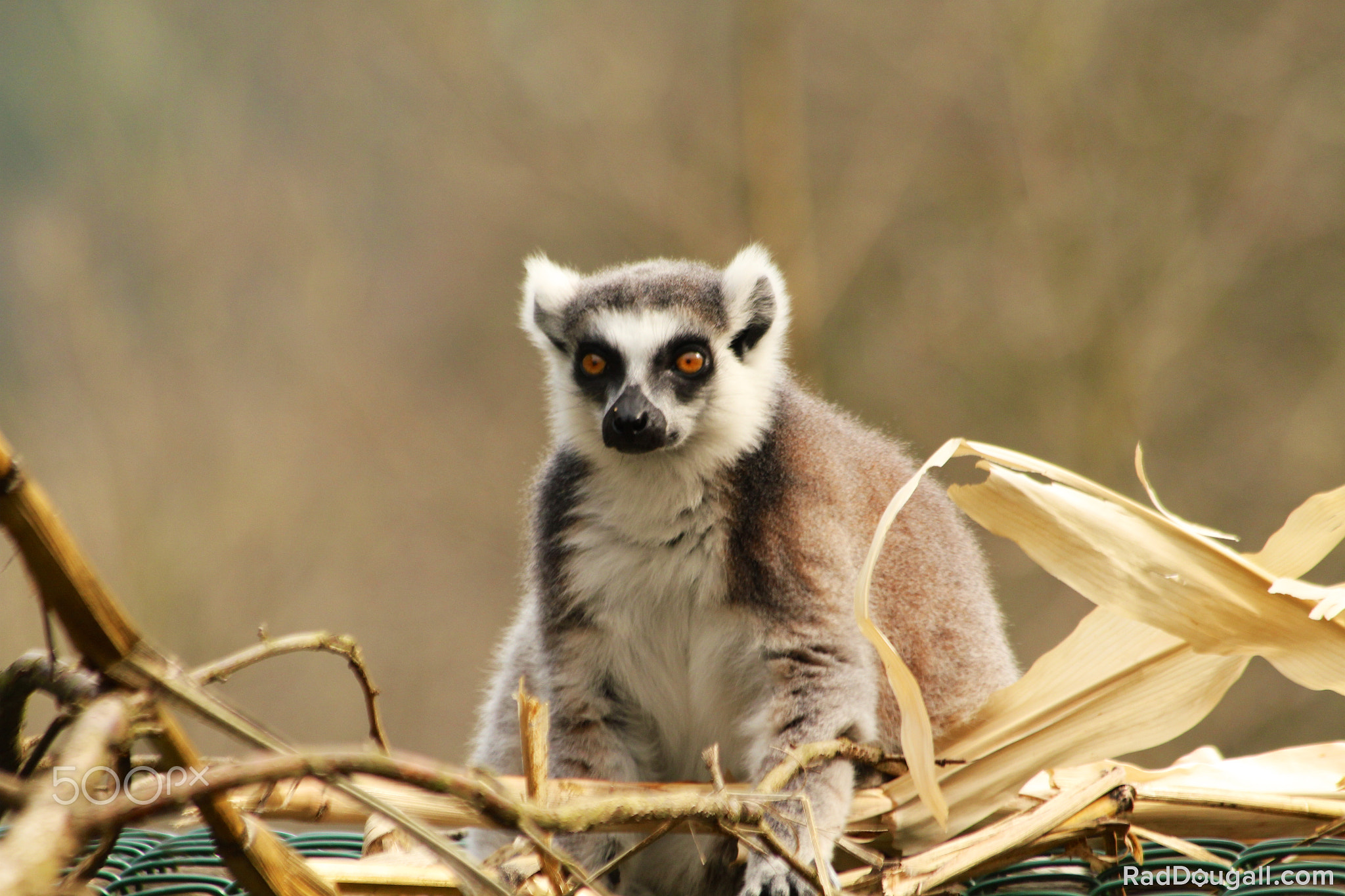
Ring tailed lemurs (Lemur catta) exhibit some of the lowest levels of parental care among primates.

Strepsirrhini is a suborder of primates which includes lemurs, lorises, and bush babies. In this suborder, males exhibit the lowest levels of paternal care for infants among primates. Examples of observed male care in this group include playing, grooming, and occasionally transporting infants. Males have also been observed interacting with infants while mothers temporarily "park" them to feed. When female strepsirrhines park or nest their infants in nearby trees, males frequently use this as an opportunity to play with the unattended infants. In this suborder, male care and affection is directed toward multiple infants, including non-biological offspring, and young strepsirrhines can be found interacting with various males. Paternal care does not influence infant growth rates or shorten inter-birth intervals of mothers as happens in haplorhines.

Strepsirrhines are constrained by their life history traits, and reproductive rates are not flexible within this group. Instead, these primates tend to give birth when food is abundant, resulting in strict seasonal breeding periods. Shortening inter-birth intervals, which is theorized to be a possible outcome of increased male care, is not beneficial for strepsirrhine mothers and can decrease infant survival. Studies also show that paternity can be highly skewed in strepsirrhines, with only one or a few male members being the only biological fathers within a single group. Instead of relying on a singular paternal figure, female mothers in this group rely on alloparenting from other group members. Infant parking and strict reproductive schedules are more beneficial for successful infant development in strepsirrhines.

=== Haplorhines ===
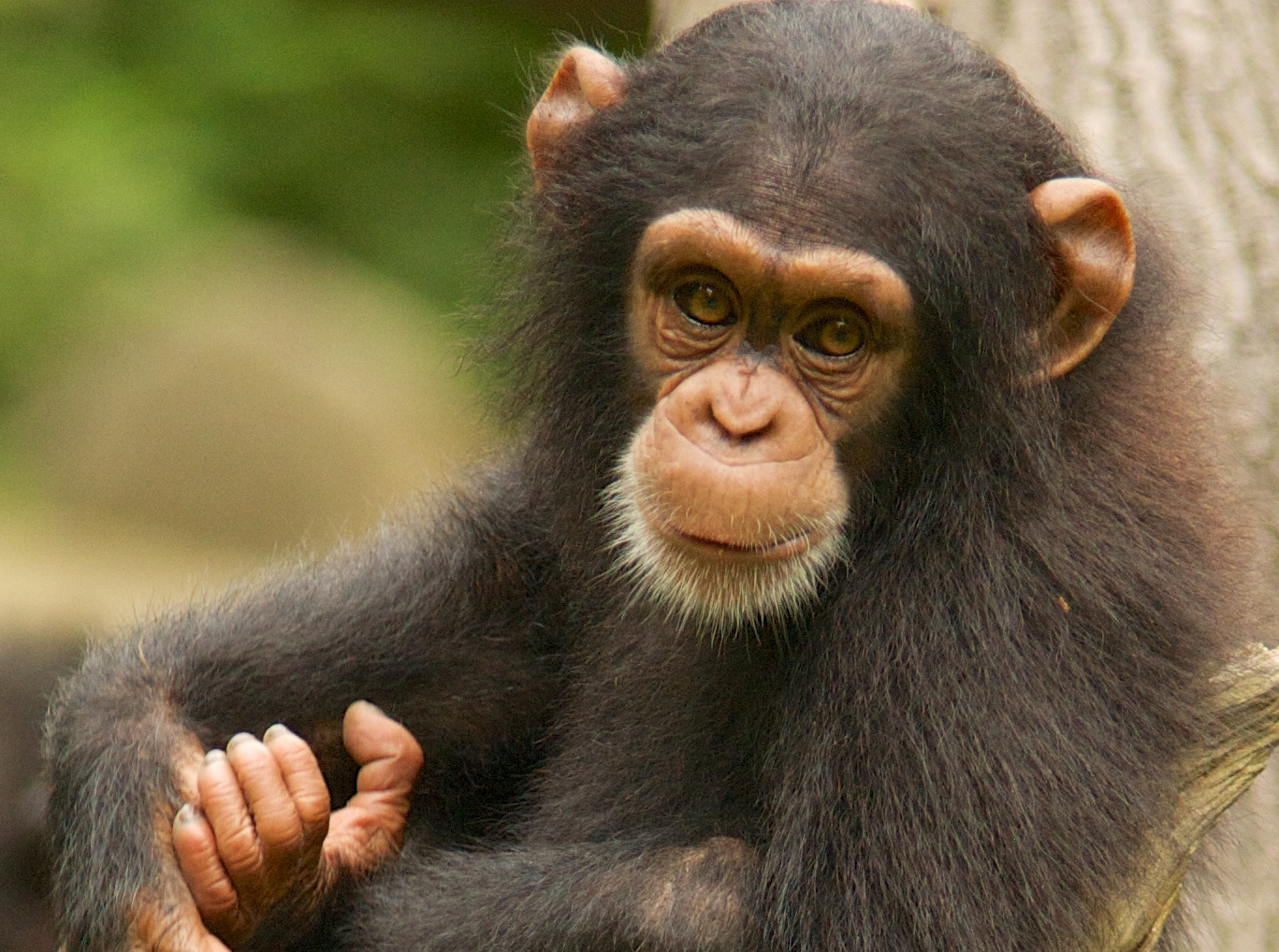
Chimpanzee (Pan troglodytes) infant

Haplorhini, a suborder of the order Primate, includes tarsiers, New World Monkeys, Old World monkeys, apes, and humans. Haplorhini is broken into two sister groups which are commonly distinguished by the characteristic of the primate nose: Catarrhini (narrow, turned-down nose) and Platyrrhini (flat nose). Paternal care is highly variable between the two sister groups and the species within them.

==== Catarrhines ====
Catarrhini is composed of Old World Monkeys (Cercopithecidae) and apes (Hylobatidae and Hominoidea). These primates are geographically located in Africa, Asia, and Madagascar.

Cercopithecines, the largest primate family, include primate species such as baboons, macaques, colobus, and vervet monkeys.

Apes consist of species of gibbons, siamangs, bonobos, chimpanzees, gorillas, orangutans, and humans.

Non-human catarrhines are often organized into a multi-male/multi-female primate social systems and utilize polygamous mating systems, creating paternity uncertainty. It is predicted that males in promiscuous mating systems do not engage in infant care due to the high costs of caring for an infant and missing opportunities to mate with receptive females. Male care in this group of primates is often portrayed through actions such as grooming, carrying, tolerance of the infant, as well as protection against agonistic interactions and infanticide. High ranking males can also provide access to food for developing infants. Compared to male intervention when an infant is being harassed by conspecifics, direct care, such as grooming or play, is not as common.

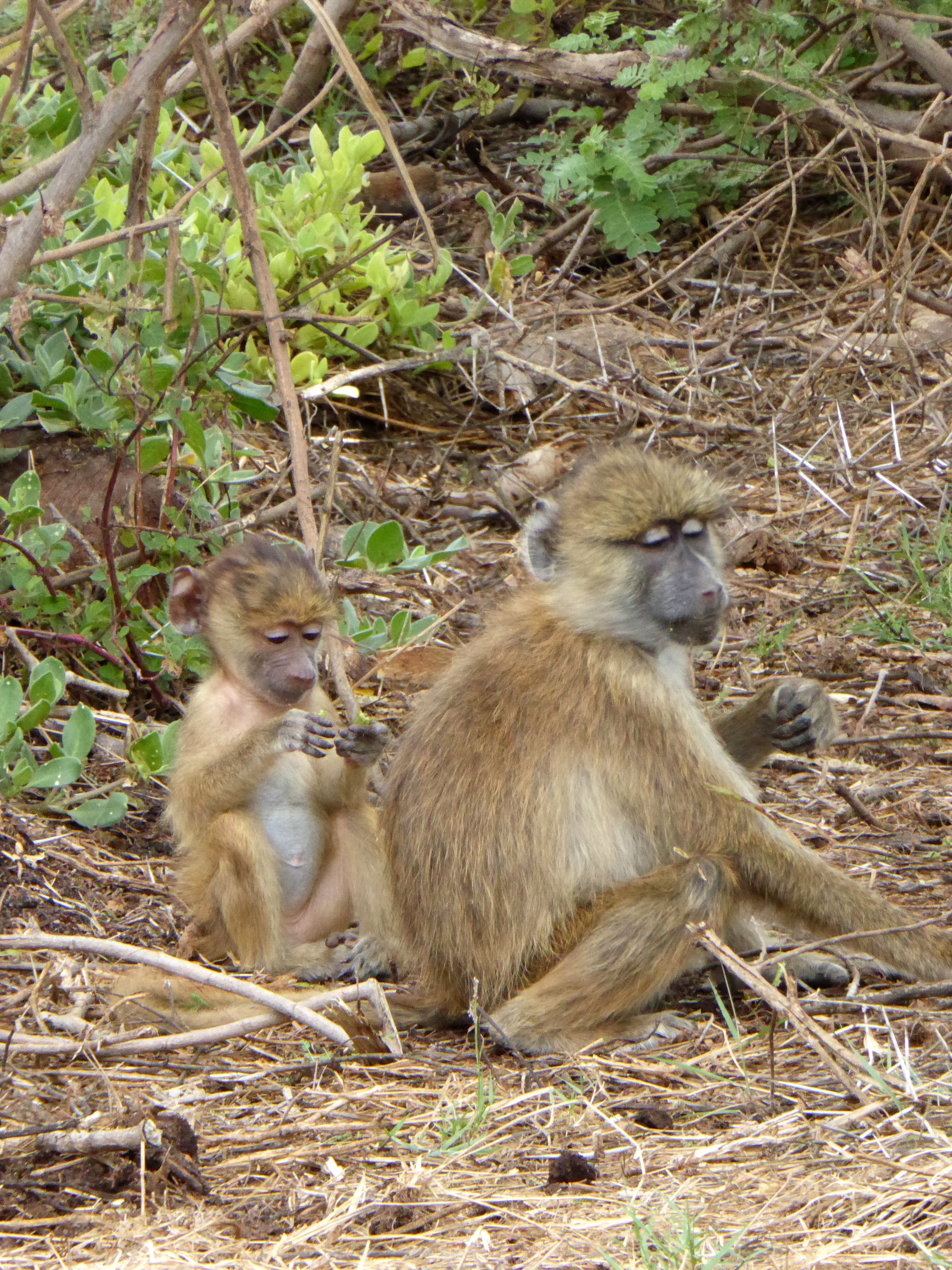
Male yellow baboon (Papio cynocephalus) are more likely to protect infants predicted to be their own.

In Cercopithecus, male involvement in the infant's interactions with conspecifics is common in many species of baboons but, between species, paternal care is not always biased towards biological offspring. Male yellow baboons (Papio cynocephalus) direct care towards their own biological offspring. Males in this species are more likely to intervene and protect infants from harassment against other group members when the infant is predicted to be their own. Studies have shown that male yellow baboons selectively choose to remain in closer proximity to their own offspring and engage in long-term investment beyond early infancy, when the infant is at greatest risk for infanticide. Infants receiving paternal investment in yellow baboons have shown enhanced fitness and accelerated maturation through males creating a safe zone for infants to exist in. Male baboons also direct care towards unrelated offspring based on male affiliations with female mothers. Baboon males and females within a social group often exhibit "friendships" with females which begin during birth of her infant. These friendships have been observed to end abruptly if the infant dies. Males establish associations with females which they have previously mated with, resulting in affiliative behavior and protection towards her offspring. Relationships created by male and female members are significant for infant survival in chacma baboons (Papio ursinus) because the risk of infanticide in early infancy is higher in this species. Paternal care in the form of protection for the infant is therefore more beneficial than long term investment in chacma baboons and is believed to be directed towards both biological and non-biological infants in the group.

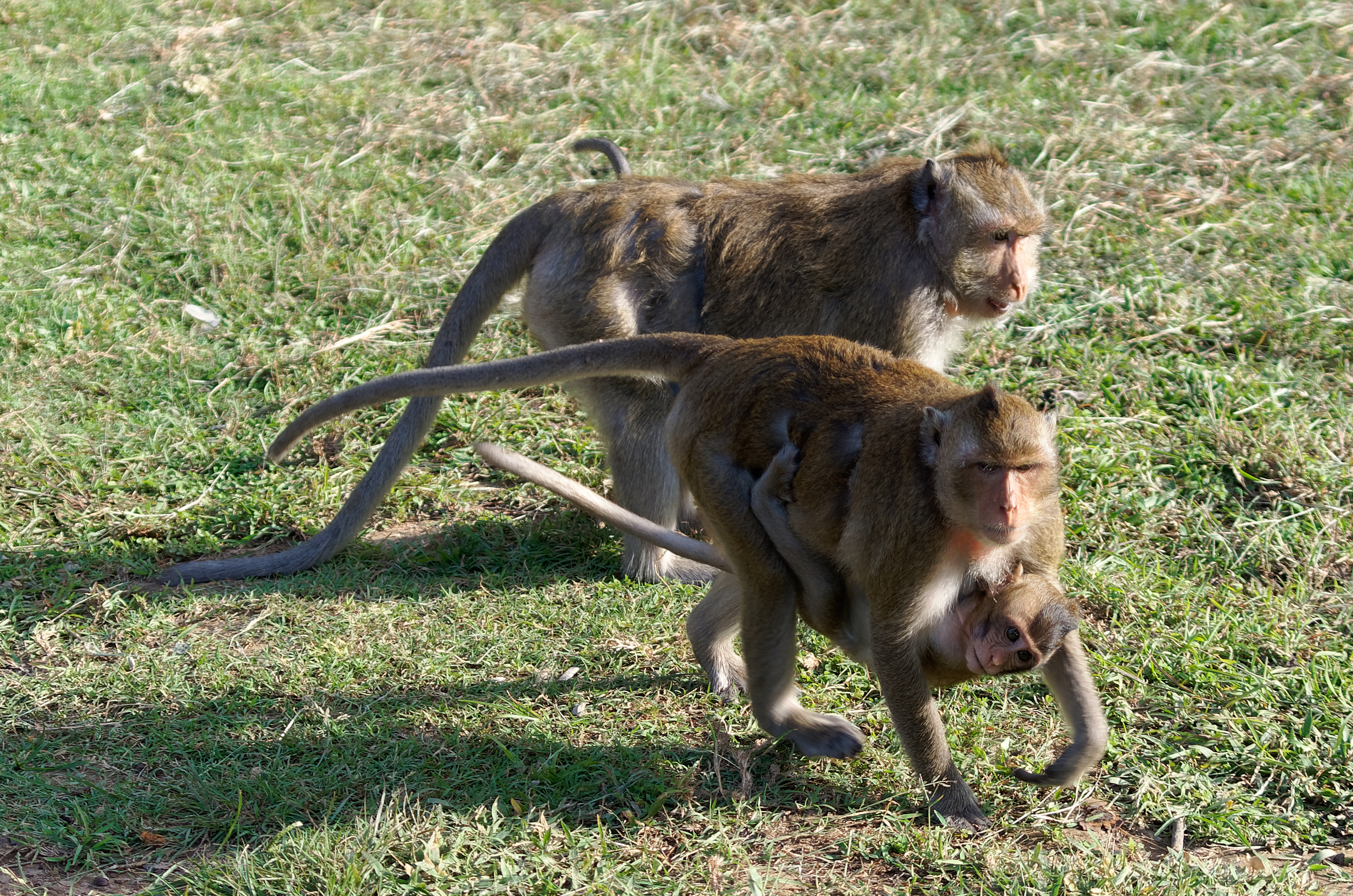
In rhesus macaque (Macaca mulatta) male parental care improves infant outcomes

Similarly to baboons, paternal roles and the underlying causes for the evolution of paternal care vary within macaque species. In Celebes crested macaques (Macaca nigra), both male rank and the relationship to the mother predicted male care towards an infant instead of true biological paternity. In both Celebes crested and Barbary macaques (Macaca sylvanus), males adopted a "care-then-mate" strategy, in which care is provided to infants regardless of paternity in order for the male to increase future mating opportunities with the mother. In both species, it was observed that male macaques are more likely to initiate care towards and positively interact with the infant in the presence of the mother. In Assam macaques (Macaca assamensis), biological paternity was the most significant predictor of male affiliations with infants, and therefore males biased care towards infants presumed to be their own. Observers found that Assamese males were more likely to engage and provide care for infants in the absence of their mothers, reducing the likelihood that care provided to infants will impress the mother and secure access to mating possibilities. In rhesus macaques, males providing protection and greater access to food resulted in higher weight gain for both male and female infants. This had a positive effect on infant survival and was significant in the first year of infancy, when the risk of infanticide is the highest.

Chimpanzees (Pan troglodytes) are organized into fission-fusion social groups and provide an example of a polygamous mating society. Male chimpanzees often engage with infants in the form of grooming, playing, and providing protection towards other group members. In both Western and Eastern chimpanzees, studies found that males were more likely to engage with their own biological offspring, suggesting that male care is influenced by paternity in these species. In both chimpanzee and bonobo social groups, high ranking alpha males sire approximately half of the offspring within their social group. More research needs to be done addressing how reproductive skew affects paternal care and infant/male relationships in non-human primates including chimpanzees and bonobos.

==== Platyrrhines ====
Platyrrhini is a sub-order of the order Primate and are commonly referred to as the New World Monkeys. These primates occupy Central and South America, and Mexico. This group is broken into five families, range in body size, and include species such as spider monkeys, capuchins, and howler monkeys.

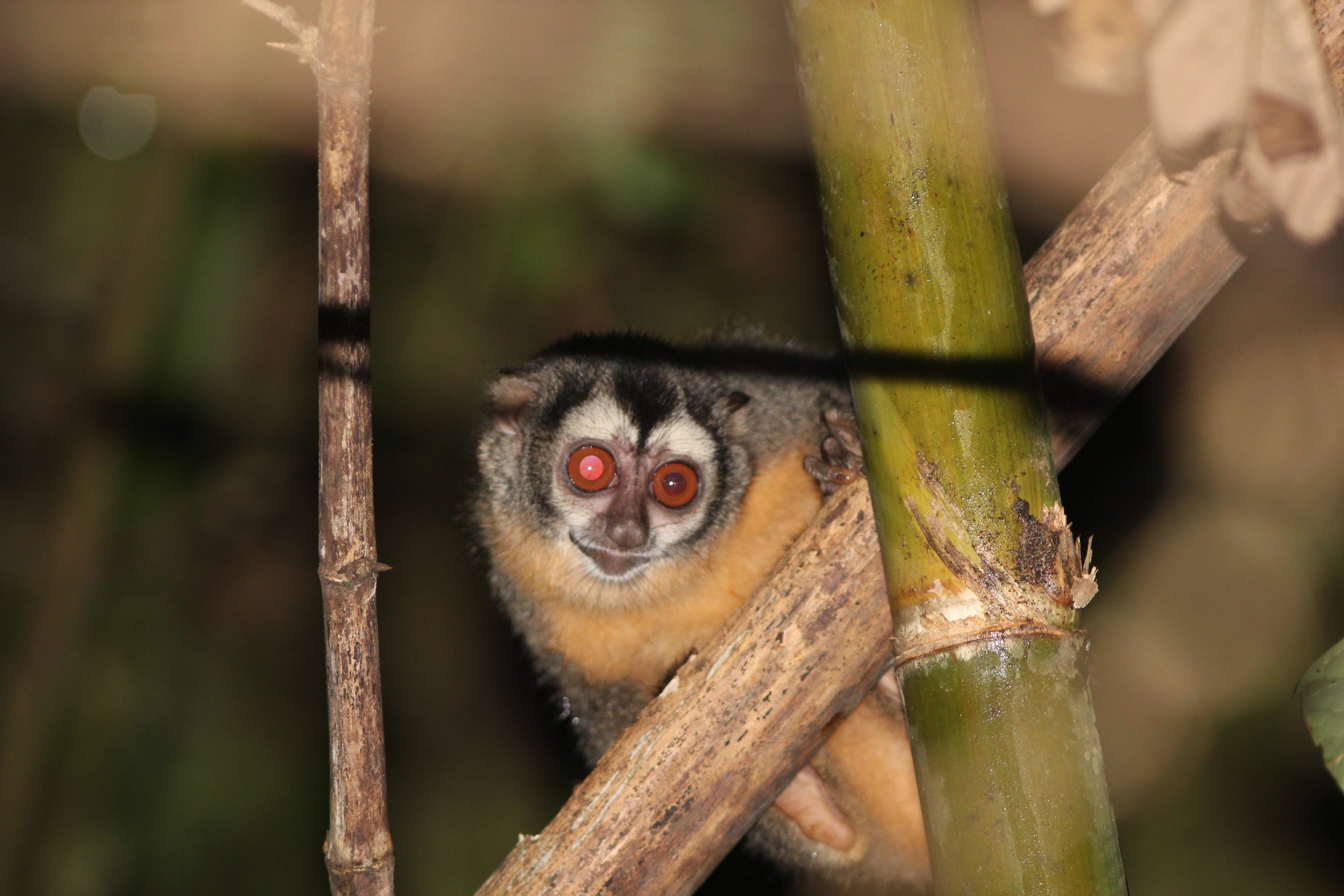
Azara's night monkey or owl monkeys (Aotus azarae) exhibit the highest levels of male care in New World monkeys.

Among primate species, the highest levels of male care found in New World monkeys are observed in owl monkeys (Aotus azarae) and the chestnut-bellied titi monkey (Plecturocebus caligatus). In both of groups, males and females are monogamous, pair-bonded, and exhibit bi-parental care for their offspring. The social group for both these species consists of female and male parents, along with their offspring. Males in these species serve as the primary caregivers and play a major role in infant survival.

Male titi monkeys are more involved than the mother in all aspects of male care except nursing, and engage in more social activities such as grooming, food sharing, play, and transportation of the infant. The bond between an infant and its father is established right after birth and maintained into adolescence. The infant's predominant attachment figure, therefore, is the father. The male owl monkey also acts as the main caregiver and is crucial to the survival of his offspring. If a female gives birth to twins, the male is still responsible for transporting both the infants. In the absence of a father, infant mortality increases in both species and it is unlikely that the infant will survive. One study found that the replacement of a male acting in the role of the father resulted in higher mortality during infancy, emphasizing the importance of the social bond created between father and offspring at birth.

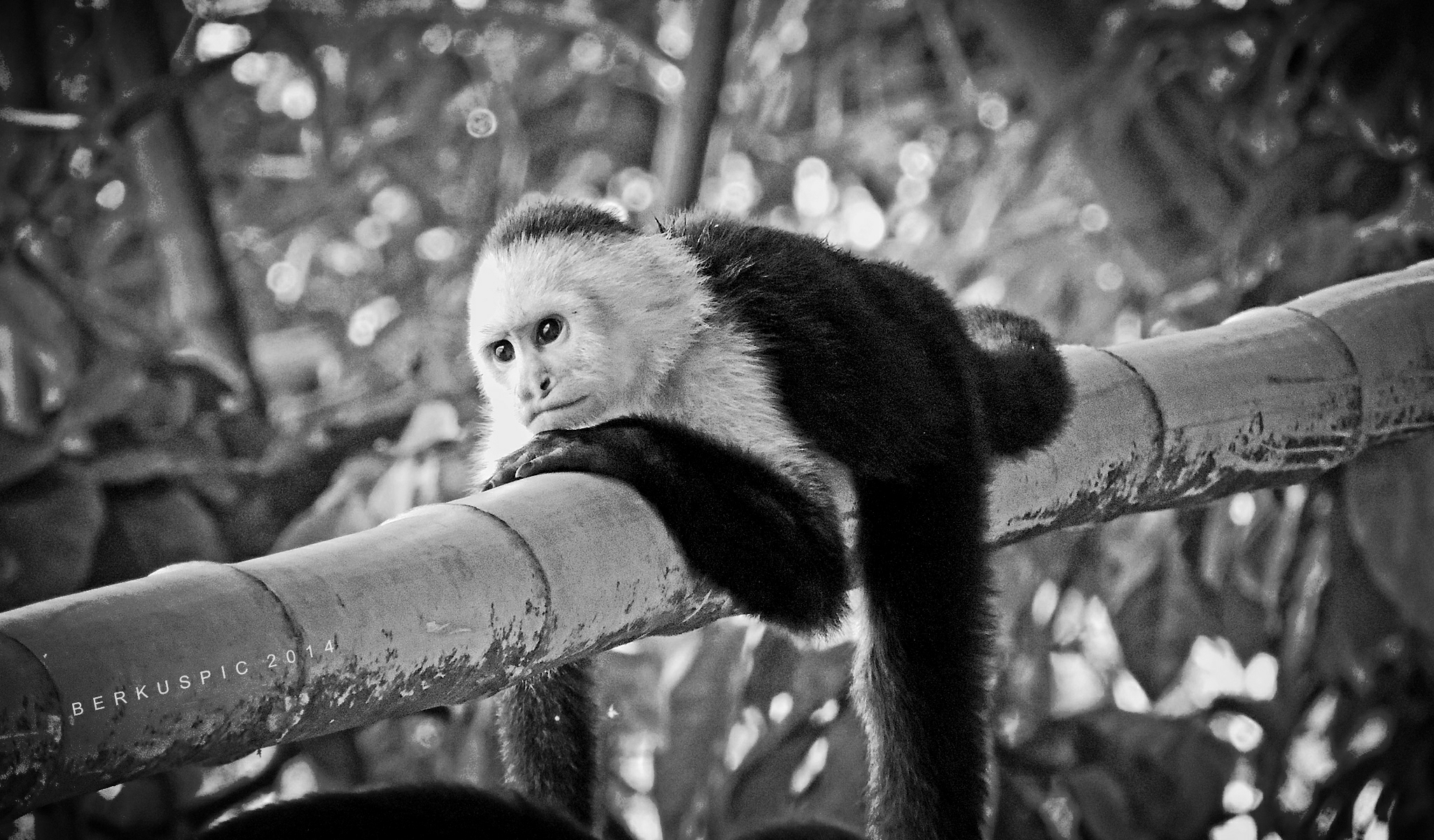
White-faced Capuchin (Cebus capucinus) exhibit parental care through playful behavior, collecting discarded food, and proximity to an infant.

In white‐faced capuchins (Cebus capucinus), one study found that parental care included playful behavior, proximity to, inspection of, and collecting discarded food items from infants as determined by male rank and dominance status rather than biological relatedness to the infant. Scientists believe that future research on kin recognition needs to be done on capuchins to determine if males choose to bias their care through phenotypic matching of biological offspring.

== Evolutionary Perspectives on Paternal Care in Primates ==
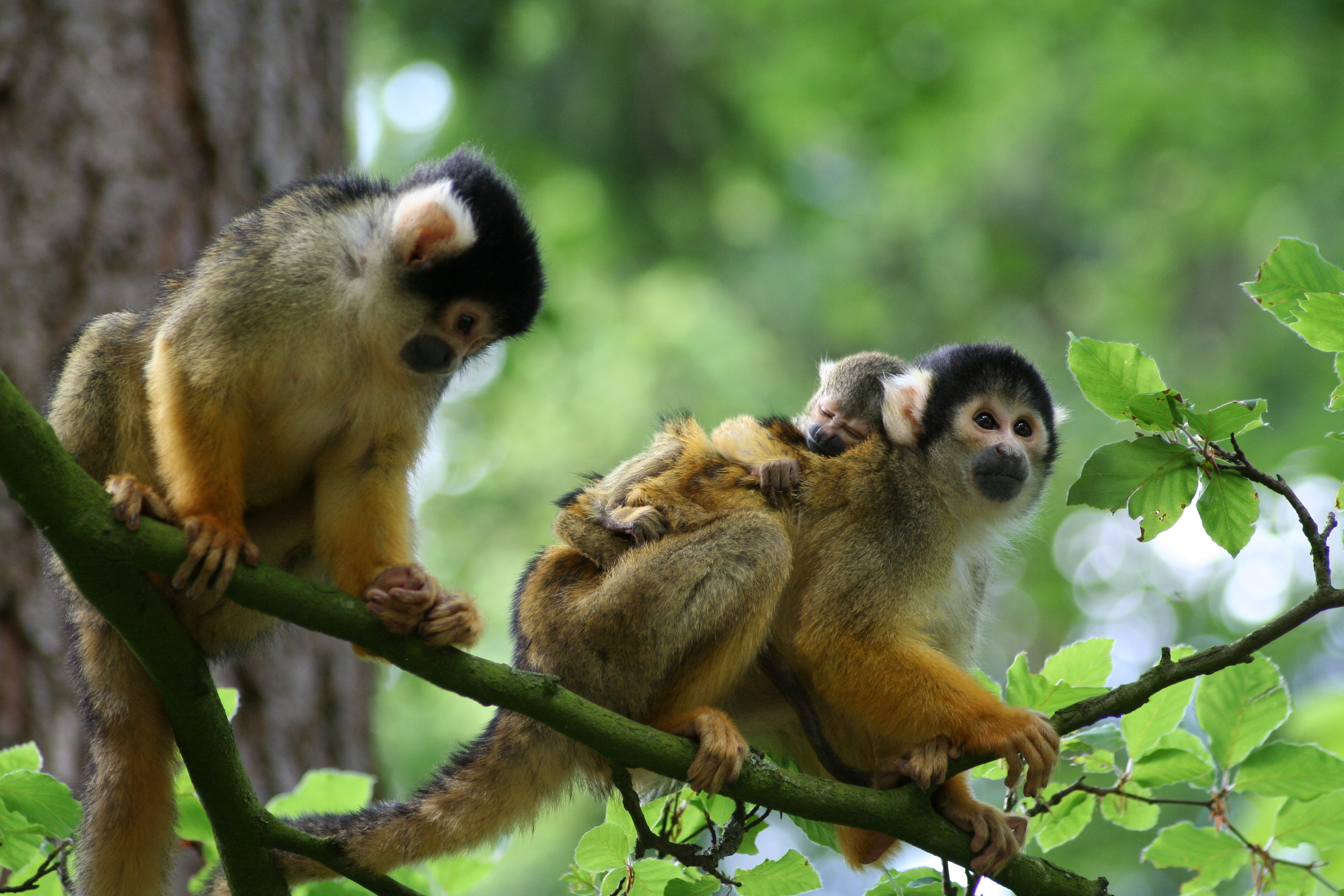
Black-capped squirrel monkeys (Saimiri boliviensis) with infant

=== Theory of Paternal Investment ===
Studies suggest that differences in how males and females care for infants stem from the ways females invest more time and energy in their offspring than males, while males compete with one another for access to females. Although paternal care is rare among mammalians, males across many primate species still play a paternal role in infant care.

Scientists have developed several hypotheses that attempt to explain how parental care arose in primate species. These include the parental care hypothesis, the mating effort hypothesis, and the maternal relief hypothesis.

The parental care hypothesis

The parental care hypothesis suggests that males of a species will invest parent care and investment to their own biological offspring, which increases the infant's chance of survival, thereby increasing the male's own fitness. This hypothesis relies on males being able to recognize their own offspring using phenotypic or behavioral cues, as paternity is uncertain in multi-male/multi-female primate groups. These cues allow males in these groups to provide short- and long-term investment in their genetic offspring. Conversely, primates living in monogamous pairs or single-male groups can rely on high paternity certainty and assist with the care in their offspring.

The mating effort hypothesis

The mating effort hypothesis suggests that males provide infant care so as to increase their mating opportunities with females. Males are more likely to engage in affiliative behaviors with infants in the presence of the mother, which enhances the male's future reproductive success. This hypothesis does not require that the infant is biologically the offspring of the male caregiver.

The maternal relief hypothesis

The maternal relief hypothesis notes that males provide care to infants to help reduce the reproductive burdens on females. Male help results in shorter inter-birth intervals and more successful outcomes for the offspring. With male help, female health and resources are not depleted, which allows her to produce higher quality milk for the infant. Like the mating effort hypothesis, maternal relief is independent of the biological relationship between the male parent and the offspring.

== Birds ==
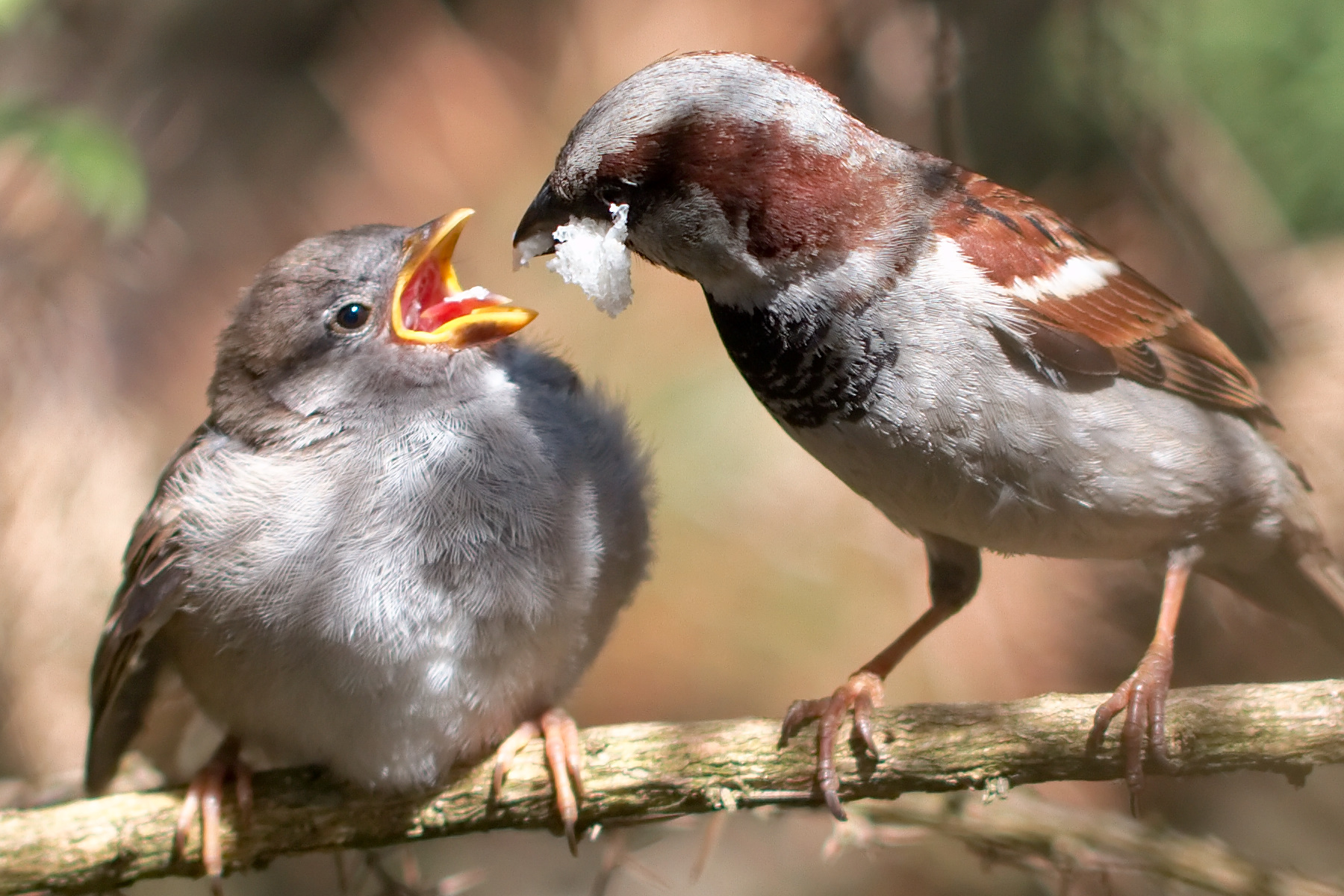
A male house sparrow (Passer domesticus) feeding a chick.

Fathers contribute equally with mothers to the care of offspring in as many as 90% of bird species, sometimes including incubating the eggs. Most paternal care is associated with biparental care in socially monogamous mating systems (about 81% of species), but in approximately 1% of species, fathers provide all care after eggs are laid. The unusually high incidence of paternal care in birds compared to other vertebrate taxa is often assumed to stem from the extensive resource requirements for production of flight-capable offspring. By contrast, in bats (the other extant flying vertebrate lineage), care of offspring is provided by females (although males may help guard pups in some species). In contrast to the large clutch sizes found in many bird species with biparental care, bats typically produce single offspring, which may be a limitation related to lack of male help. It has been suggested, though not without controversy, that paternal care is the ancestral form of parental care in birds.

== Amphibians ==
Paternal care occurs in a number of species of anuran amphibians, including glass frogs.

== Fish ==
According to the Encyclopedia of Fish Physiology: From Genome to Environment:

About 30% of the 500 known fish families show some form of parental care, and most often (78% of the time) care is provided by only one parent (usually the male). Male care (50%) is much more common than female care (30%) with biparental care accounting for about 20%, although a more recent comparative analysis suggests that male care may be more common (84%).

There are three common theoretical explanations for the high levels of paternal care in fish, with the third one currently favoured. First, external fertilization protects against paternity loss; however, sneaker tactics and strong sperm competition have evolved many times. Second, the earlier release of eggs than sperm gives females an opportunity to flee; however, in many paternal care species, eggs and sperm are released simultaneously. Third, if a male is already protecting a valuable spawning territory in order to attract females, defending young adds minimal parental investment, giving males a lower relative cost of parental care.

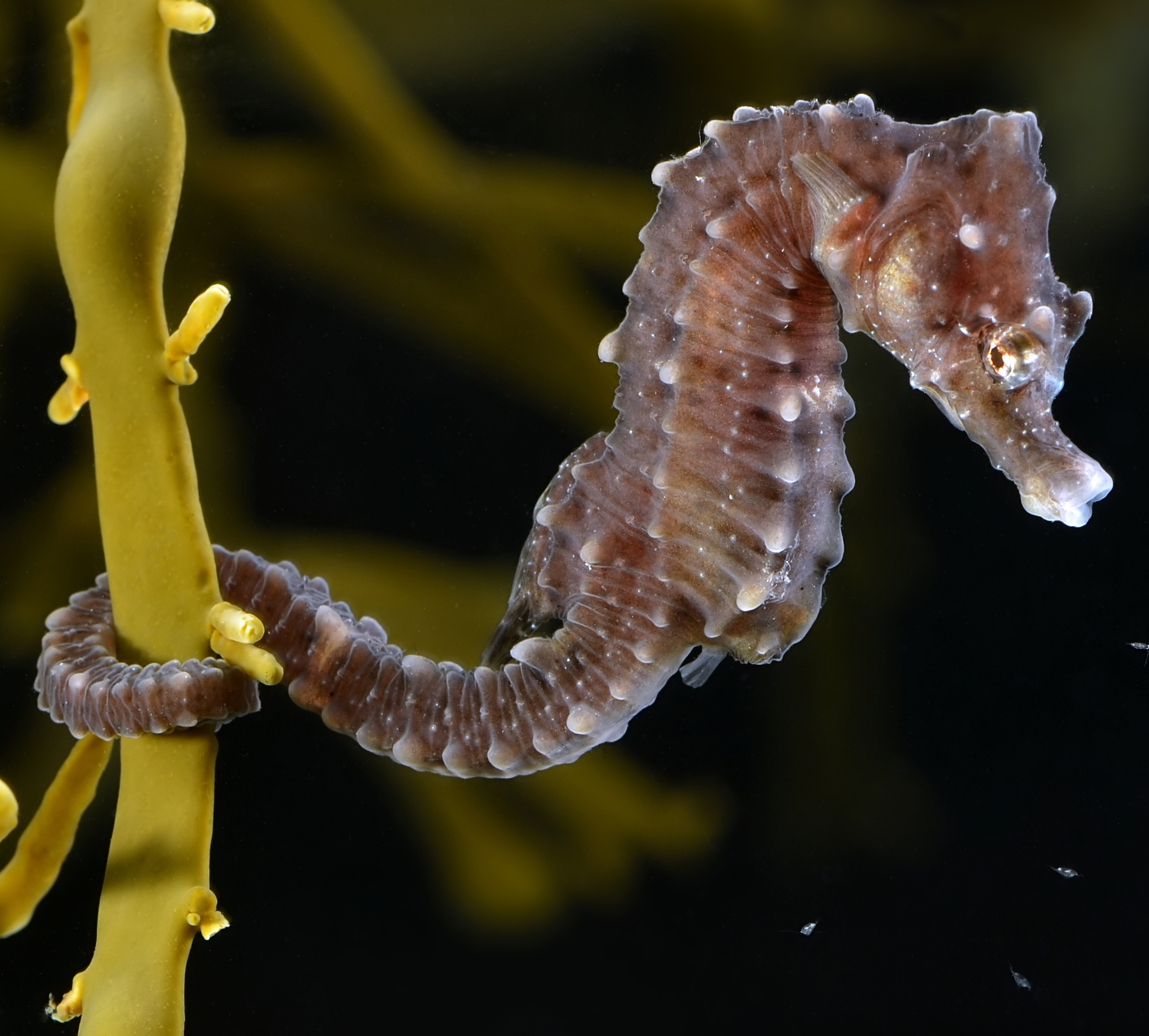
Seahorses like the short-snouted seahorse (Hippocampus hippocampus) exhibit male parental care.

One well-known example of paternal care is in seahorses, where males brood the eggs in a brood pouch until they are ready to hatch.

Males from the Centrarchidae (sunfish) family exhibit parental care of their eggs and fry through a variety of behaviors such as nest guarding and nest fanning (aerating eggs).

In jawfish, the female lays the eggs and the male then takes them in his mouth. A male can have up to 400 eggs in his mouth at one time. The male can't feed while he hosts the young, but as the young get older, they spend more time out of the mouth. This is sometimes termed mouthbrooding.

During the breeding season, male three-spined sticklebacks defend nesting territories. Males attract females to spawn in their nests and defend their breeding territory from intruders and predators. After spawning, the female leaves the male's territory and the male is solely responsible for the care of the eggs. During the ~6-day incubation period, the male 'fans' (oxygenates) the eggs, removes rotten eggs and debris, and defends the territory. Even after embryos hatch, father sticklebacks continue to tend their newly hatched offspring for ~7 days, chasing and retrieving fry that stray from the nest and spitting them back into the nest.

== Arthropods ==
Paternal care is rare in arthropods, but occurs in some species, including the giant water bug and Iporangaia pustulosa, an opilione. In several species of crustaceans, males provide care of offspring by building and defending burrows or other nest sites. Exclusive paternal care, where males provide the sole investment after egg-laying, is the rarest form, and is known in only 13 taxa: giant water bugs, sea spiders, two genera of leaf-footed bugs, two genera of assassin bugs, three genera of phlaeothripidae thrips, three genera of harvestmen, and in millipedes of the family Andrognathidae.

== Theoretical models of the evolution of paternal care ==
Mathematical models related to the prisoner's dilemma suggest that when female reproductive costs are higher than male reproductive costs, males cooperate with females even when they do not reciprocate. In this view, paternal care is an evolutionary achievement that compensates for the higher energy demands that reproduction typically involves for mothers.

Other models suggest that basic life-history differences between males and females are adequate to explain the evolutionary origins of maternal, paternal, and bi-parental care. Specifically, paternal care is more likely if male adult mortality is high, and maternal care is more likely to evolve if female adult mortality is high. Basic life-history differences between the sexes can also cause evolutionary transitions among different sex-specific patterns of parental care.

== Consequences for offspring survival and development ==
Care by fathers can have important consequences for survival and development of offspring in both humans and other species. Mechanisms underlying such effects may include protecting offspring from predators or environmental extremes (e.g., heat or cold), feeding them, or, in some species, direct teaching of skills. Moreover, some studies indicate a potential epigenetic germline inheritance of paternal effects.

The effects of paternal care on offspring can be studied in various ways. One way is to compare species that vary in the degree of paternal care. For example, an extended duration of paternal care occurs in the gentoo penguin as compared with other Pygoscelis species. It was found that their fledging period, the time between a chick's first trip to sea and its absolute independence from the group, was longer than other penguins of the same genus. The authors hypothesized that this was because it allowed chicks to better develop their foraging skills before becoming completely independent from their parents. By doing so, a chick may have a higher chance of survival and increase the population's overall fitness.

== Proximate mechanisms ==
The proximate mechanisms of paternal care are not well understood for any organism. In vertebrates, at the level of hormonal control, vasopressin apparently underlies the neurochemical basis of paternal care; prolactin and testosterone may also be involved. As with other behaviors that affect Darwinian fitness, reward pathways in the brain may reinforce the expression of paternal care and may be involved in the formation of attachment bonds.

The mechanisms that underlie the onset of parental behaviors in female mammals have been characterized in a variety of species. In mammals, females undergo endocrine changes during gestation and lactation that "prime" mothers to respond maternally towards their offspring.

Paternal males do not undergo these same hormonal changes and so the proximate causes of the onset of parental behaviors must differ from those in females. There is little consensus regarding the processes by which mammalian males begin to express parental behaviors. In humans, evidence ties oxytocin to sensitive care-giving in both women and men, and with affectionate infant contact in women and stimulatory infant contact in men. In contrast, testosterone decreases in men who become involved fathers and testosterone may interfere with aspects of paternal care.

Placentophagia (the behavior of ingesting the afterbirth after parturition) has been proposed to have physiological consequences that could facilitate a male's responsiveness to offspring Non-genomic transmission of paternal behavior from fathers to their sons has been reported to occur in laboratory studies of the biparental California mouse, but whether this involves (epigenetic) modifications or other mechanisms is not yet known.

== See also ==
- Bateman's principle
- Behavior
- Behavioral ecology
- Challenge hypothesis
- Cinderella effect
- Ecophysiology
- Evolutionary neuroscience
- Evolutionary psychology
- Human physiology
- Kin selection
- Life history theory
- Neuroscience
- Parental leave
- Parental alienation
- Physiology
- r/K selection theory
- Shared parenting
- Social behavior
- Tinbergen's four questions
