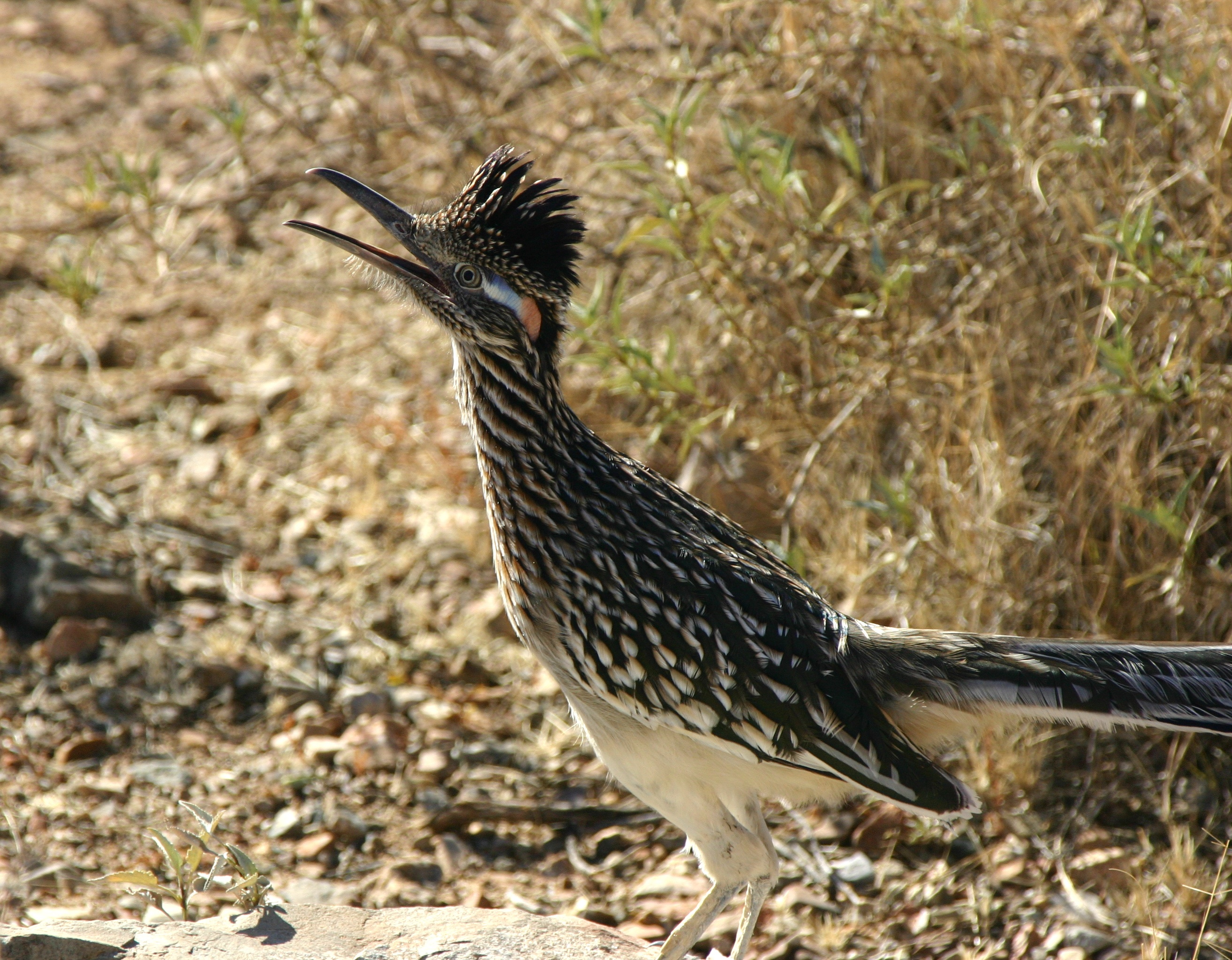
- Greater roadrunner (Geococcyx californianus)

Scientific classification
- Kingdom: Animalia
- Phylum: Chordata
- Class: Aves
- Order: Cuculiformes
- Family: Cuculidae
- Subfamily: Neomorphinae; Shelley, 1891

Genera
- Dromococcyx; Geococcyx; Morococcyx; Neomorphus; Tapera

= Neomorphinae =

Neomorphinae Temporal range: Early Oligocene to recent

Subfamily of birds

The Neomorphinae are a subfamily of the cuckoo family, Cuculidae. Members of this subfamily are known as New World ground cuckoos, since most are largely terrestrial and native to the Americas. Only Dromococcyx and Tapera are more arboreal, and these are also the only brood parasitic cuckoos in the Americas, while the remaining all build their own nests.

== Genera ==
Image	Genus	Living species
	Dromococcyx Wied-Neuwied, 1832	D. pavoninus Pelzeln, 1870 – pavonine cuckoo; D. phasianellus (Spix, 1824) – pheasant cuckoo
	Geococcyx Wagler, 1831	G. californianus (Lesson, 1829) – greater roadrunner; G. velox (Wagner, 1836) – lesser roadrunner
	Morococcyx P.L. Sclater, 1862	M. erythropygus (Lesson, 1842) – lesser ground cuckoo
	Neomorphus Gloger, 1827	N. geoffroyi (Temminck, 1820) – rufous-vented ground cuckoo; N. pucheranii Deville, 1851 – red-billed ground cuckoo; N. radiolosus Sclater & Salvin, 1878 – banded ground cuckoo; N. rufipennis (Gray, 1849) – rufous-winged ground cuckoo; N. squamiger (Todd, 1925) – scaled ground cuckoo
	Tapera Thunberg, 1819	T. naevia (Linnaeus, 1766) – striped cuckoo
