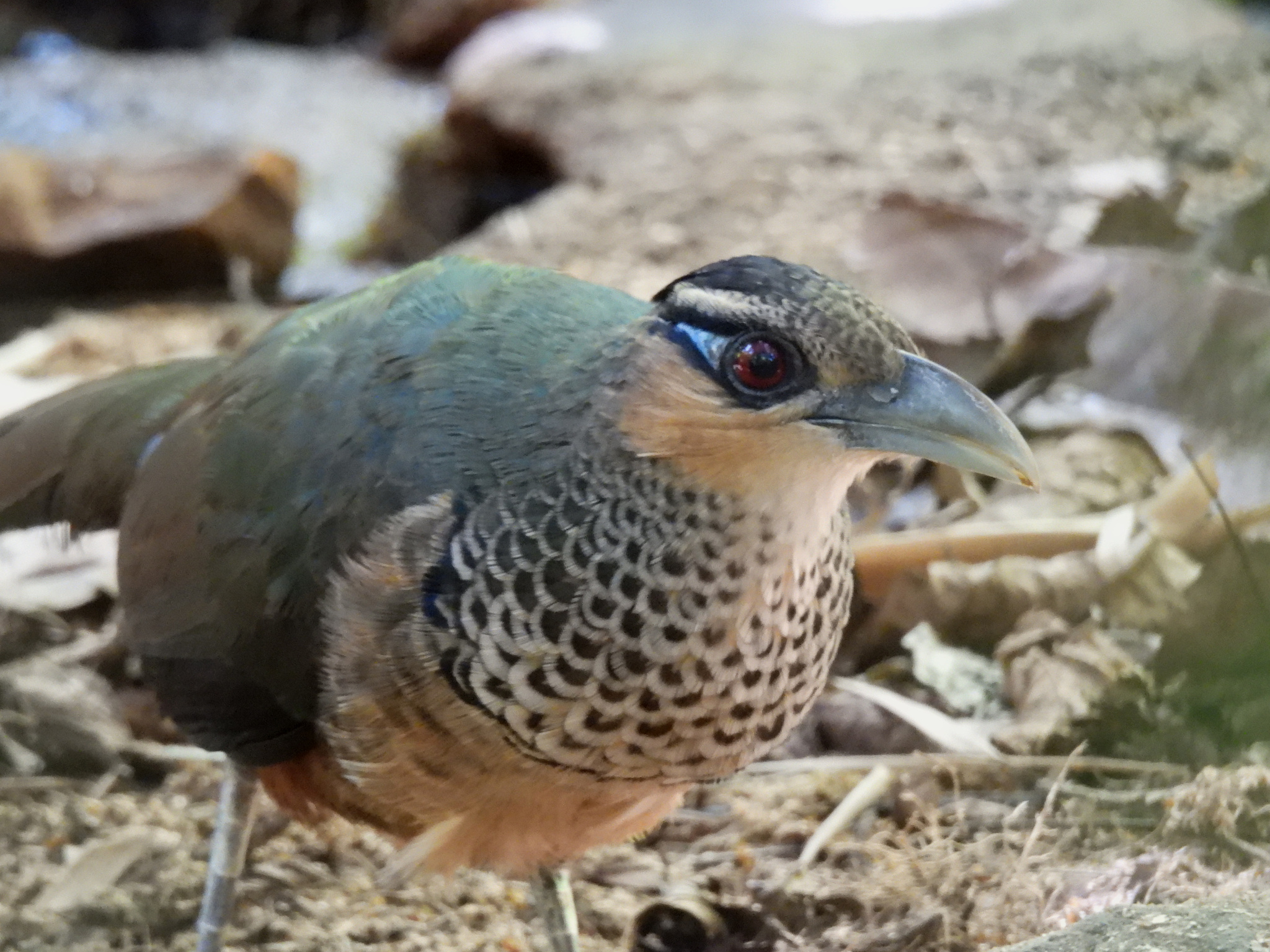

Scientific classification
- Kingdom: Animalia
- Phylum: Chordata
- Class: Aves
- Order: Cuculiformes
- Family: Cuculidae
- Genus: Neomorphus
- Species: N. squamiger

Binomial name
- Neomorphus squamiger Todd, 1925

Synonyms
- Neomorphus geoffroyi squamiger

= Scaled ground cuckoo =

Species of bird in Brazil

The scaled ground cuckoo (Neomorphus squamiger) is a species of cuckoo in the tribe Neomorphini of subfamily Crotophaginae. It is endemic to the Amazon rainforest near the Tapajos River in Brazil.

== Taxonomy and systematics ==
The scaled ground cuckoo's taxonomic status has not been settled. The South American Classification Committee (SACC) of the American Ornithological Society, the International Ornithological Committee, and the Clements taxonomy treat it as a species. However, BirdLife International's Handbook of the Birds of the World (HBW) treats it as a subspecies of the rufous-vented ground cuckoo (N. geoffroyi), and the SACC is seeking a proposal to possibly reevaluate their treatment.

This article follows the majority treatment as a species. It is monotypic.

== Description ==
The scaled ground cuckoo is about 43 cm (17 in) long, about half of which is its tail, and weighs about 340 g (12 oz). Adults have a heavy decurved bill that is greenish with a bluish dusky base and a yellowish tip. The sexes have similar plumage. Adults have a brownish forehead and crown and a shaggy, glossy, blue-black, erectile crest. Most of the face is cinnamon buff but with bright cobalt blue bare skin behind the eye. Their hindneck and upper back are bronzy olive brown, the lower back bronzy brown to purplish, and the rump and uppertail coverts deep purplish brown with a bronze gloss. Their tail is black with a purple and green gloss on the upper side. Their wings are olive green with purple-glossed bluish primaries. Their throat is dusky white to pale buff. Their breast is buff or grayish with bold black semicircles that give it a scaly appearance and has an indistinct black band below it. The rest of the underparts are whitish or buffy with chestnut on the flanks, lower belly, and undertail coverts. Juveniles' breasts and flanks are dark brown and the belly dark brown with a paler center.

Some authors state that the scaled ground cuckoo can easily be separated from the rufous-vented ground cuckoo by the lack of a dark chest band and some other characteristics. Others maintain that the variation in these features in the Amazonian subspecies of rufous-vented ground cuckoos (N. g. amazonicus) makes the distinction questionable, leading to the lack of agreement on its status.

== Distribution and habitat ==
The scaled ground cuckoo is generally considered to be restricted to the lower drainage of the Rio Tapajós, a southern tributary of the Amazon River, roughly between Parintins on the west and the Rio Xingu on the east. There are also a few records in the upper reaches of the Tapajós drainage. It inhabits mature undisturbed evergreen forest.

== Behavior ==
=== Locomotion ===
The scaled ground cuckoo is almost exclusively terrestrial, though it flys to low perches to rest or preen. It mostly walks or runs on the forest floor.

=== Feeding ===
The scaled ground cuckoo's diet is not known but is assumed to be mostly insects like that of other Neomorphus cuckoos. Their diet also includes significant amounts of other arthropods; small vertebrates like lizards, amphibians, and small birds; and sometimes fallen fruits. The scaled ground cuckoo is known to often follow army ant swarms and has been observed following peccaries, presumably to catch prey fleeing from them.

=== Breeding ===
Almost nothing is known about the scaled ground cuckoo's breeding phenology and its nest has not been described. Both are assumed to be similar to those of other Neomorphus cuckoos.

=== Vocal and non-vocal sounds ===
What is thought to be the scaled ground cuckoo's song is "a soft, low dove-like OOOOOOOoo about 1-2 seconds in length given repeatedly with approximately 1-2 seconds between songs." It makes a dry clacking sound by clapping its bill.

== Status ==
The IUCN until 2011 assessed the scaled ground cuckoo as Near Threatened. However, IUCN follows HBW taxonomy and since then has not evaluated the scaled ground cuckoo separately from the rufous-vented. That species as a whole is assessed as Vulnerable due to forest fragmentation and destruction because it requires large undisturbed forest. Because so many details of the species' life history are unknown, its exact status is uncertain, but with its very small range and restricted habitat requirements it is "highly sensitive to human disturbance."
