= Roadrunner =

- Greater roadrunner

Scientific classification
- Kingdom: Animalia
- Phylum: Chordata
- Class: Aves
- Order: Cuculiformes
- Family: Cuculidae
- Subfamily: Neomorphinae
- Genus: Geococcyx; Wagler, 1831

Type species
- Geococcyx variegata Wagler, 1831

Species
- G. californianus G. velox

Genus of birds

The roadrunners (genus Geococcyx), also known as chaparral birds or chaparral cocks, are two species of fast-running ground cuckoos with long tails and crests. They are found in the southwestern and south-central United States, Mexico and Central America, usually in the desert. Although capable of flight, roadrunners generally run away from predators. On the ground, some have been measured at 32 km/h (20 mph).

== Species ==
The subfamily Neomorphinae, the New World ground cuckoos, includes 11 species of birds, while the genus Geococcyx has just two:

Genus Geococcyx – Wagler, 1831 – two species
| Common name | Scientific name and subspecies | Range | Size and ecology | IUCN status and estimated population |
|---|---|---|---|---|
| Greater roadrunner | Geococcyx californianus (Lesson, 1829) | Mexico and the southwestern and south-central United States | Size: Habitat: Shrubland, Grassland, Desert Diet: | LC 1,400,000 ▲ |
| Lesser roadrunner | Geococcyx velox (Wagner, 1836) | Mexico and Central America | Size: Habitat: Shrubland, Artificial/Terrestrial Diet: | LC 500,000–4,999,999 |

== Morphology ==
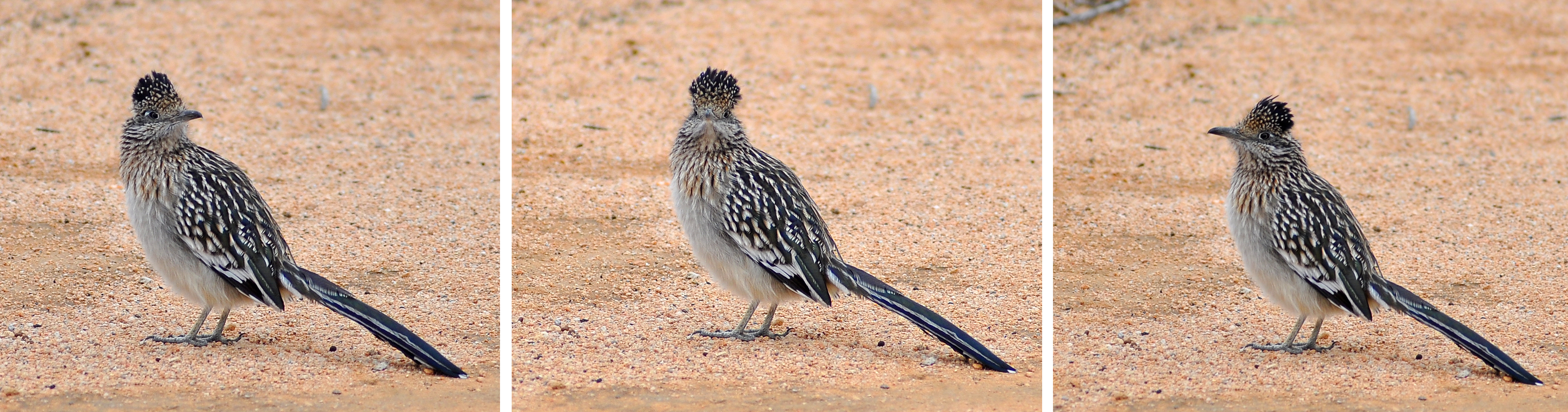
Three views of the same specimen

The roadrunner generally ranges in size from 56 to 61 cm (22 to 24 in) from tail to beak. The average weight is about 230–430 g (8–15 oz). The roadrunner is a slender, black-brown and white-streaked ground bird with a distinctive head crest. It has long legs, strong feet, and an oversized dark bill. The tail is broad with white tips on the three outer tail feathers. The bird has a bare patch of skin behind each eye; this patch is shaded blue anterior to red posterior. The lesser roadrunner is slightly smaller, not as streaky, and has a smaller bill. Both the lesser roadrunner and the greater roadrunner leave behind very distinct "X" track marks appearing as if they are travelling in both directions.

Roadrunners and other members of the cuckoo family have zygodactyl feet. The roadrunner can run at speeds of up to 32 km/h (20 mph) and generally prefer sprinting to flying, though it will fly to escape predators. During flight, the short, rounded wings reveal a white crescent in the primary feathers.

=== Vocalization ===
Roadrunner beak clatter

The roadrunner has a slow and descending dove-like "coo". It also makes a rapid, vocalized clattering sound with its beak.

== Geographic range ==
Roadrunners inhabit the Southwestern United States, to parts of Missouri, Arkansas, and Louisiana, as well as Mexico and Central America. They live in arid lowland or mountainous shrubland or woodland. They are non-migratory, staying in their breeding area year-round. The greater roadrunner is not currently considered threatened in the US, but is habitat-limited.

== Food and foraging habits ==
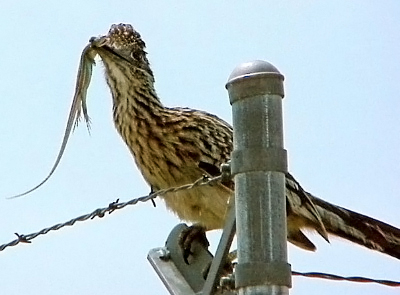
Greater roadrunner with a lizard

The roadrunner is an opportunistic omnivore. Its diet normally consists of insects (such as grasshoppers, crickets, caterpillars, and beetles), small reptiles (such as lizards and snakes, including rattlesnakes), rodents and other small mammals, spiders (including tarantulas), scorpions, centipedes, snails, small birds (and nestlings), eggs, and fruits and seeds like those from prickly pear cactuses and sumacs. The lesser roadrunner eats mainly insects. The roadrunner forages on the ground and, when hunting, usually runs after prey from under cover. It may leap to catch insects, and commonly batters certain prey against the ground. The roadrunner is one of the few animals that preys upon rattlesnakes; it is also the only real predator of tarantula hawk wasps.

== Behavior and breeding ==
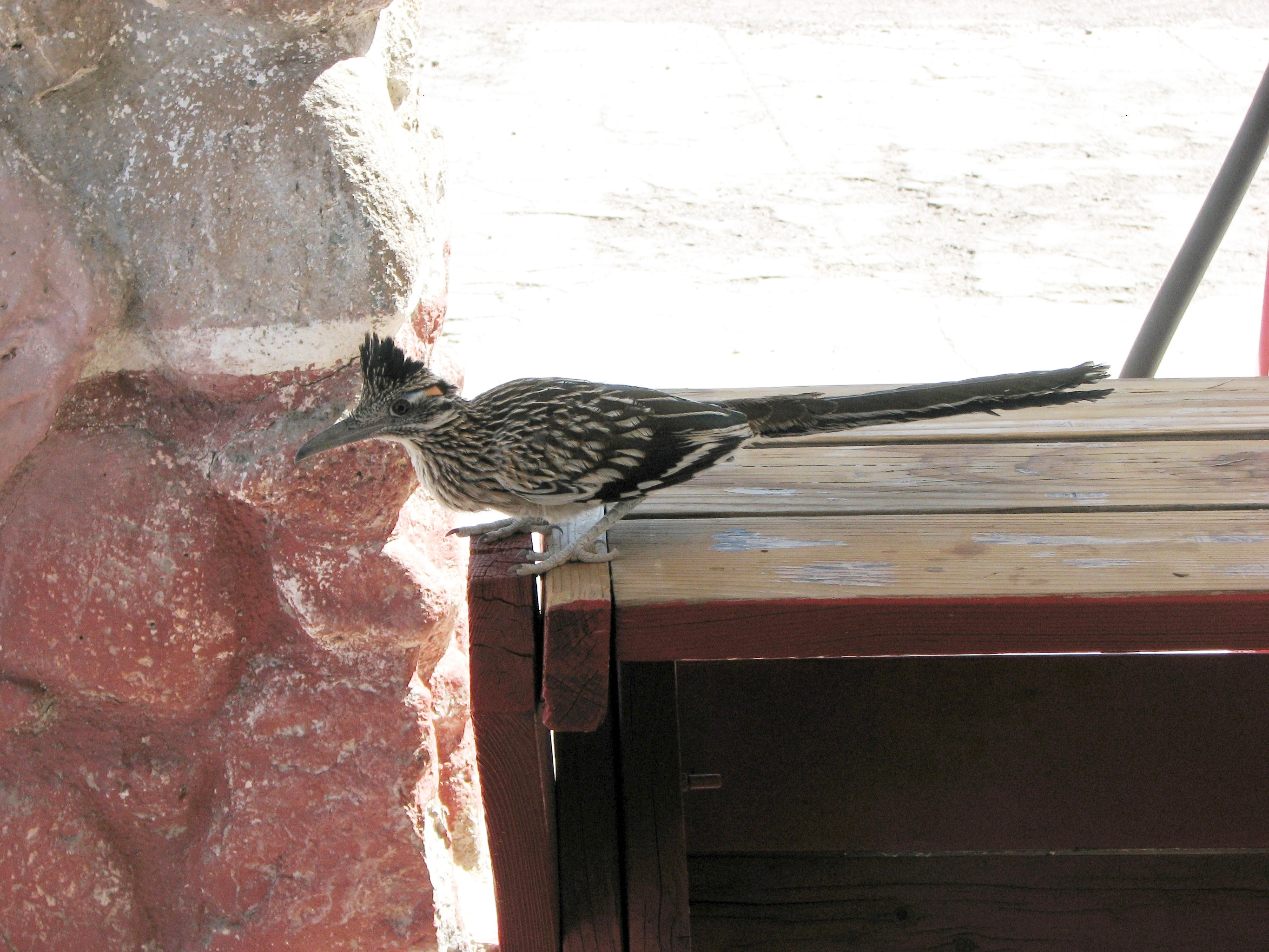
Greater roadrunners often become habituated to the presence of people.

The roadrunner usually lives alone or in pairs. Breeding pairs are monogamous and mate for life, and pairs may hold a territory all year. During the courtship display, the male bows, alternately lifting and dropping his wings and spreading his tail. He parades in front of the female with his head high and his tail and wings drooped, and may bring an offering of food. The reproductive season is spring to mid-summer (depending on geographic location and species).

The roadrunner's nest is often composed of sticks, and may sometimes contain leaves, feathers, snakeskins, or dung. It is commonly placed 1 to 3 meters (3 to 10 feet) above ground level in a low tree, bush, or cactus. Roadrunner eggs are generally white. The greater roadrunner generally lays 2–6 eggs per clutch, but the lesser roadrunner's clutches are typically smaller. Hatching is asynchronous. Both sexes incubate the nest (with males incubating the nest at night) and feed the hatchlings. For the first one to two weeks after the young hatch, one parent remains at the nest. The young leave the nest at two to three weeks old, foraging with parents for a few days after.

== Thermoregulation ==
Greater roadrunner warming itself in the sun, exposing the dark skin and feathers on its back

During the cold desert night, the roadrunner lowers its body temperature slightly, going into a slight torpor to conserve energy. To warm itself during the day, the roadrunner exposes dark patches of skin on its back to the sun.

== Indigenous lore ==
The Hopi and other Pueblo tribes believed roadrunners were medicine birds, capable of warding off evil spirits. The X-shaped footprints of roadrunners were seen as sacred symbols, believed to confuse evil spirits by concealing the bird's direction of travel. Stylized roadrunner tracks have been found in the rock art of ancestral Southwestern tribes like the Mogollon cultures. Roadrunner feathers were used to decorate Pueblo cradleboards for spiritual protection. Among Mexican Indian and American Indian tribes, such as the Pima, seeing a roadrunner is considered good luck. While some Mexican tribes revered the roadrunner and never killed it, most used its meat as a folk remedy for illness or to boost stamina and strength.

Central American Indigenous peoples have various beliefs about the roadrunner. The Chʼortiʼ, known to call it tʼunkʼuʼx or muʼ, have taboos against harming the bird. The Chʼol Maya believe roadrunners possess special powers, calling it ajkumtzʼuʼ due to its call, which is believed to induce tiredness in listeners.

The word for roadrunner in the Oʼodham language is taḏai. In the Oʼodham tradition, the roadrunner is also credited with bringing fire to the people.

== In media ==
The roadrunner is the state bird of New Mexico.

The roadrunner was made popular by the Warner Bros. cartoon characters Wile E. Coyote and the Road Runner, created in 1949, and the subject of a long-running series of theatrical cartoon shorts. In each episode, the cunning, insidious, and constantly hungry Wile E. Coyote repeatedly attempts to catch and subsequently eat the Road Runner, but is never successful. The cartoons take comic liberties with the depictions of both animals, substituting a car horn-like "beep-beep" for the roadrunner's call, along with a "plup" noise while sticking out its tongue. In real life, a roadrunner's speed presents no challenge for a coyote, which can sprint at 64 km/h (40 mph) to the roadrunner's 32 km/h (20 mph).

A roadrunner plays a prominent role in T.Kingfisher's 2025 novel, Snake-eater.

== General references ==
- Alsop, Fred J. III (2002). Birds of North America (1st American ed.). New York: DK. ISBN 0-7894-8001-8.
- del Hoyo, Josep; Baptista, Luis, eds. (1997). Sandgrouse to cuckoos. Barcelona: Lynx Ed. ISBN 84-87334-22-9.
- Harrison, George (2005). "Comical Cuckoo". Birder's World. 19: 56–58.
- Hutchins, Michael, ed. (2003). Grzimek's Animal Life Encyclopedia (2nd ed.). Detroit: Gale. ISBN 0-7876-5785-9.
- Meinzer, Wyman (1993). "Beep! Beep! Better pull over, folks – it's the roadrunner". Smithsonian. 23: 58.
- Perrins, Christopher M., ed. (1990). The Illustrated Encyclopedia of Birds: The Definitive Reference to Birds of The World (1st Prentice Hall Press ed.). New York: Prentice Hall Editions. ISBN 0-13-083635-4.
- National Geographic Society (2002). Field Guide to the Birds of North America (4th ed.). Washington D.C.: National Geographic. p. 244. ISBN 0-7922-6877-6.
- Wetmore, Alexander; Kellog, Peter Paul (1965). Water, Prey, and Game Birds of North America. Washington D.C.: National Geographic Society.
