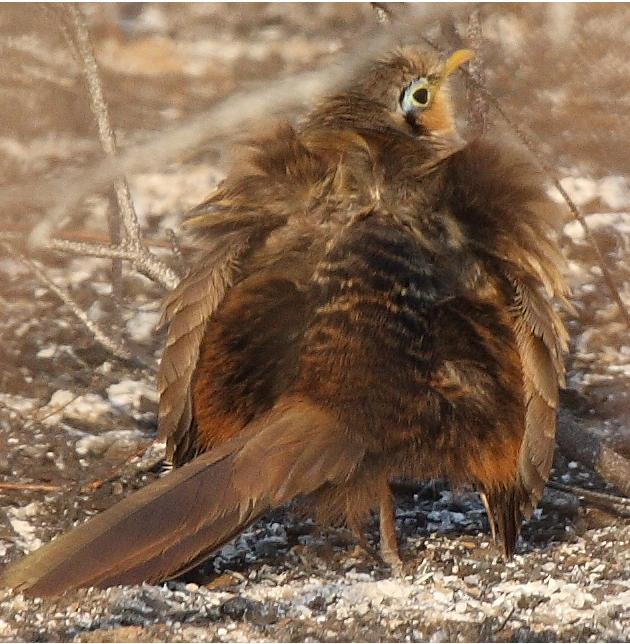

Conservation status
- Least Concern (IUCN 3.1)

Scientific classification
- Kingdom: Animalia
- Phylum: Chordata
- Class: Aves
- Order: Cuculiformes
- Family: Cuculidae
- Genus: Morococcyx; P.L. Sclater, 1862
- Species: M. erythropygus

Binomial name
- Morococcyx erythropygus (Lesson, R., 1842)

= Lesser ground cuckoo =

Species of bird

The lesser ground cuckoo (Morococcyx erythropygus) is a species of cuckoo in the tribe Neomorphini of subfamily Crotophaginae. It is found in Costa Rica, El Salvador, Guatemala, Honduras, Mexico, and Nicaragua.

== Taxonomy and systematics ==
The lesser ground cuckoo is the only member of its genus. It has two subspecies, the nominate M. e. erythropygus and M. e. mexicanus.

== Description ==
The lesser ground cuckoo is 25 to 28 cm (9.8 to 11 in) long. Males weigh about 58 to 66 g (2.0 to 2.3 oz) and females about 56 to 76 g (2.0 to 2.7 oz). Females are somewhat paler than males but otherwise do not differ. They have a slightly decurved bill with a blackish brown maxilla and an orange mandible. Their face is intricately patterned, with a bright yellow ring around the eye with bare blue skin behind it and thin black lines surrounding the area, a short indistinct whitish stripe above the eye, and cinnamon ocracous cheeks. Adults of the nominate subspecies have a grayish brown crown, an olive brown nape and back, a sooty blackish lower back and rump, and olive brown uppertail coverts. Their tail is mostly olive brown with a purplish bronze gloss and buff to whitish tips on top and light grayish brown on the underside with dull blackish bands near the end of the outer feathers. Their underparts from chin to vent are cinnamon ochraceous. Immatures are similar to adults but duller and do not have the pale tips and blackish bands on the tail.

Adults of subspecies M. e. mexicanus are larger and paler than the nominate, with somewhat grayer upperparts and underparts tending to ochraceous buff or pale buff, but a darker underside to the tail.

== Distribution and habitat ==
The nominate subspecies of lesser ground cuckoo is found from southern Mexico south through Guatemala, El Salvador, Honduras, and Nicaragua into Costa Rica. M. e. mexicanus is found on the Pacific slope of western Mexico between Sinaloa and the Isthmus of Tehuantepec. The species inhabits semiarid to arid landscapes including the interior and edges of woodlands, thorn forest, secondary forest, and savanna. Those in southwestern Mexico are almost exclusively found in thorn forest.

== Behavior ==
=== Movement ===
The lesser ground cuckoo is a year-round resident throughout its range.

=== Feeding ===
The lesser ground cuckoo feeds on insects captured while walking on the ground or picked from vegetation with short leaps. Details of its diet are lacking.

=== Breeding ===
The lesser ground cuckoo's breeding seasons vary geographically but are not fully known. In Costa Rica it breeds between February and May and its season in Mexico apparently includes May and June. It makes a shallow bowl nest of sticks or leaves on the ground. Both adults incubate the clutch of two eggs. The incubation period and time to fledging are not known.

=== Vocalization ===
The lesser ground cuckoo's song has been described as "a series of 10 or more loud rolling or trilling notes...usually introduced by 2–3 clear, ascending whistles" and as "loud, rich, rolled whistles, suggesting a referee's whistle...prree,...prree,....prree, prree-prree-prreeprree ... prree, prree, prree,....prree,.........prree". It also made "a clear whistle, teeeee" and "a rough, growling ghaaaoow".

== Status ==
The IUCN has assessed the lesser ground cuckoo as being of Least Concern. It has a very large range and an estimated population between 50,000 and 500,000 mature individuals, though the latter is believed to be decreasing. No immediate threats have been identified.
