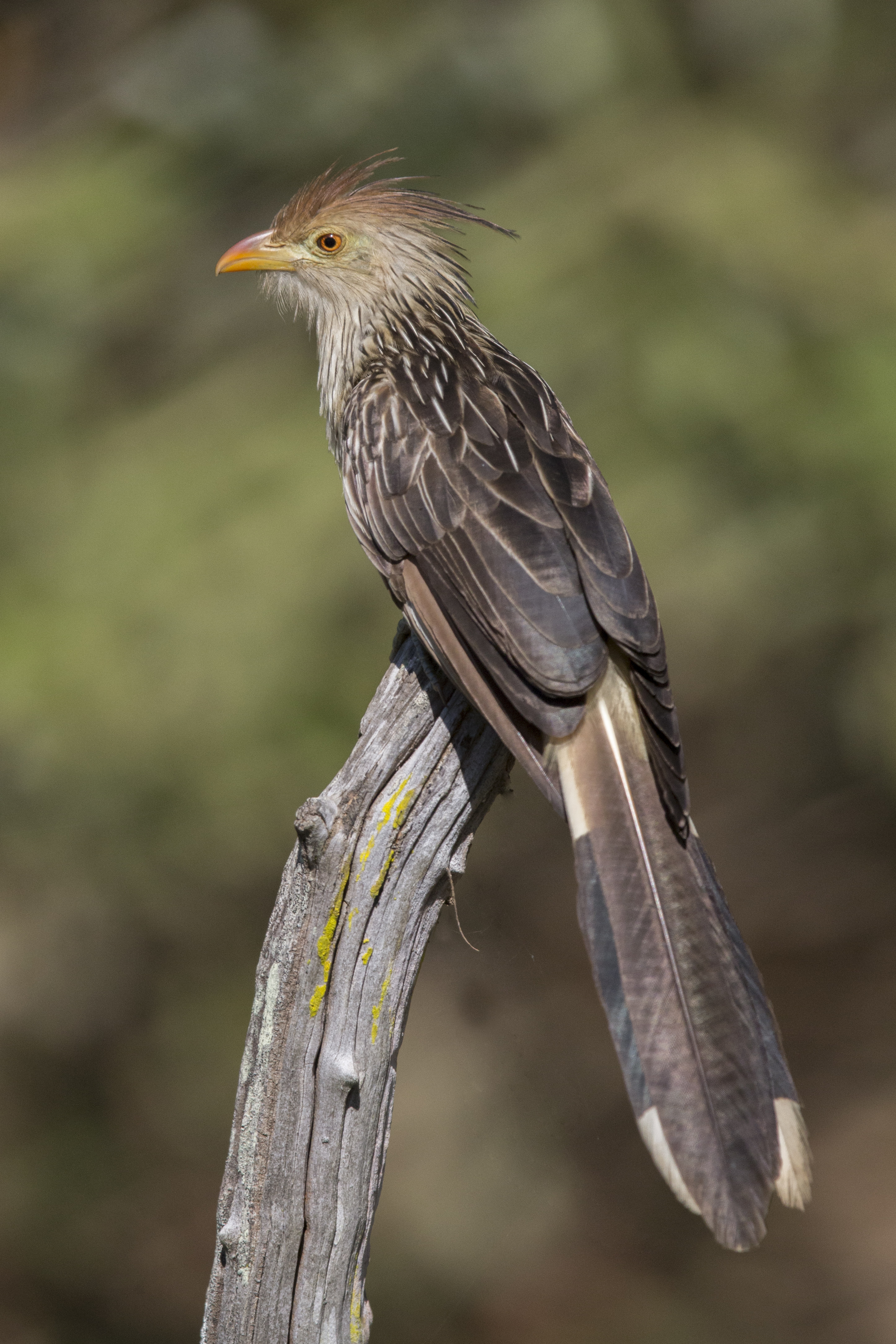
- At the Pantanal, Brazil

Conservation status
- Least Concern (IUCN 3.1)

Scientific classification
- Kingdom: Animalia
- Phylum: Chordata
- Class: Aves
- Order: Cuculiformes
- Family: Cuculidae
- Subfamily: Crotophaginae
- Genus: Guira; Lesson, 1830
- Species: G. guira

Binomial name
- Guira guira (Gmelin, JF, 1788)
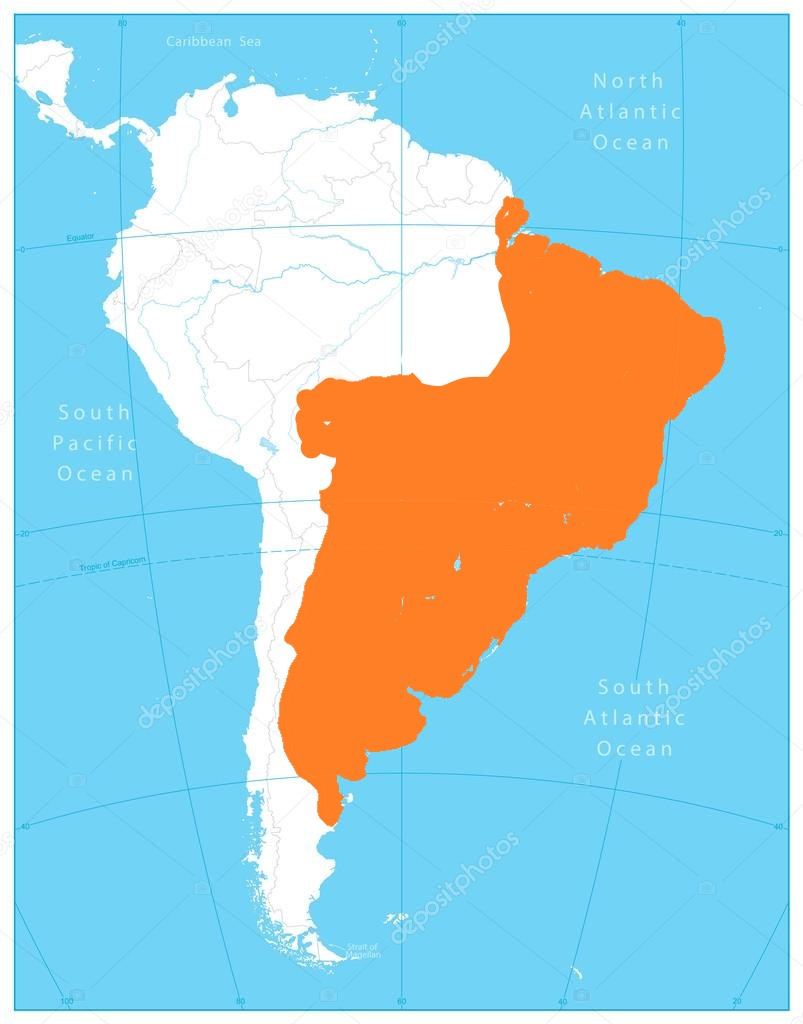

= Guira cuckoo =

Species of bird

The guira cuckoo, known in Spanish as the pirincho (Guira guira), is a gregarious species of cuckoo found widely in open and semi-open habitats throughout eastern and southeastern South America. It is the only species placed in the genus Guira. Its range has expanded significantly as a result of deforestation, and it is commonly seen in suburban parks and gardens.

== Taxonomy ==
The guira cuckoo was described and illustrated in 1648 by the German naturalist Georg Marcgrave in his Historia Naturalis Brasiliae. He used the name "Guira angatara". The word gûyrá means "bird" in the Old Tupi language. Later ornithologists based their descriptions on Marcgrave's account: Francis Willughby in 1678, John Ray in 1713, Mathurin Jacques Brisson in 1760, and Georges-Louis Leclerc, Comte de Buffon in 1779. When the German naturalist Johann Friedrich Gmelin revised and expanded Carl Linnaeus's Systema Naturae in 1788 he included the guira cuckoo. He placed it with all the other cuckoos in the genus Cuculus and coined the binomial name Cuculus guira. The guira cuckoo is now the only species placed in the genus Guira that was introduced in 1830 by the French naturalist René Lesson. The species is monotypic: no subspecies are recognised. It is most closely related to the anis in the genus Crotophaga.

== Description ==
The guira cuckoo has a total length of approximately 34 cm (13 in) and weighs 140 g (4.9 oz). The sexes are very similar in appearance, except that the female is slightly larger than the male. Juveniles appear quite similar to adults.

The species has dark brown upperparts streaked with white, and whitish-buff throat, breast, underparts and rump. The tail is relatively long and broad, dark brown in color with a white-tip, and the legs are dark gray. The eyes and beak are yellow to orange, with a thin ring of featherless yellow skin around the eye (this commonly fades in captivity). There is a prominent orange-rufous crest.

The bird's call is unmistakable for being long and shrill, something between a long whistle and a wailing. Like other members of the subfamily Crotophaginae, the guira cuckoo gives off a strong, pungent odour.

== Distribution ==
The guira cuckoo is native to northeastern, eastern and southern Brazil, Uruguay, Paraguay, Bolivia, and northeastern Argentina. A bird of open habitats such as pastures and wetlands, its range has expanded significantly as a result of deforestation. Within its distribution, it is commonly seen in suburban parks and gardens.

== Behaviour ==
Like the related squirrel cuckoo, the guira cuckoo is not a particularly adept flier, and usually flies only for short distances. It is often seen gliding or hopping from one perch to another while vocalizating loudly. Although it is primarily an arboreal bird, it is often seen foraging on the ground, sometimes alone but often in flocks of up to 18 individuals. It is sometimes seen with other birds whose behaviour is similar, such as the smooth-billed ani. Unlike many of the Old World cuckoos, the guira cuckoo does not practice brood parasitism or kleptoparasitism.

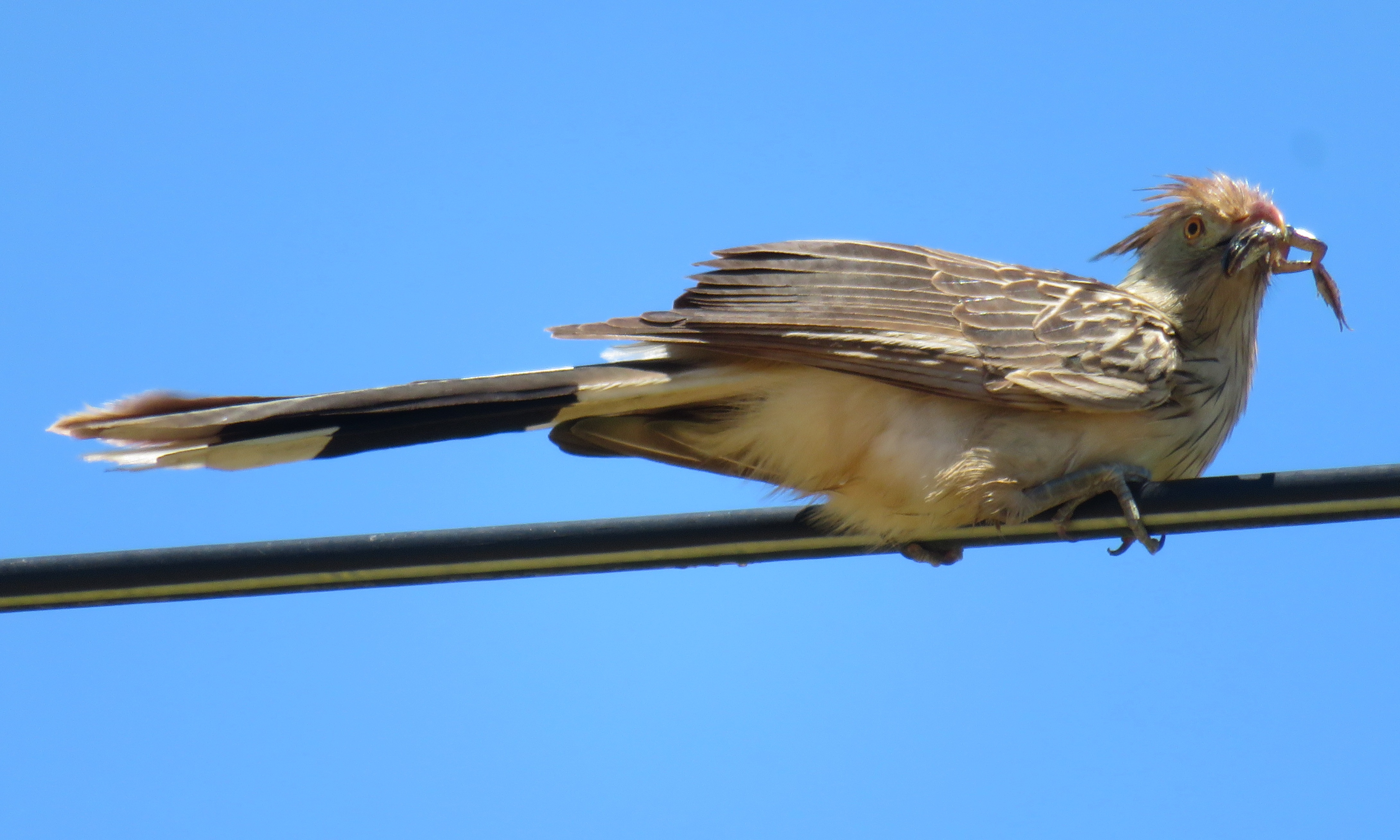
Guira cuckoo with a captured frog. Tacuaras, Ñeembucú Department, Paraguay.

=== Food and feeding ===
The guira cuckoo is an opportunistic predator, gathering small prey items on the ground or searching for them among branches. It feeds on worms, insects and other arthropods, tadpoles and frogs, eggs, small birds (especially nestlings) and small mammals such as mice. It also has been observed feeding on lizards.

=== Breeding ===
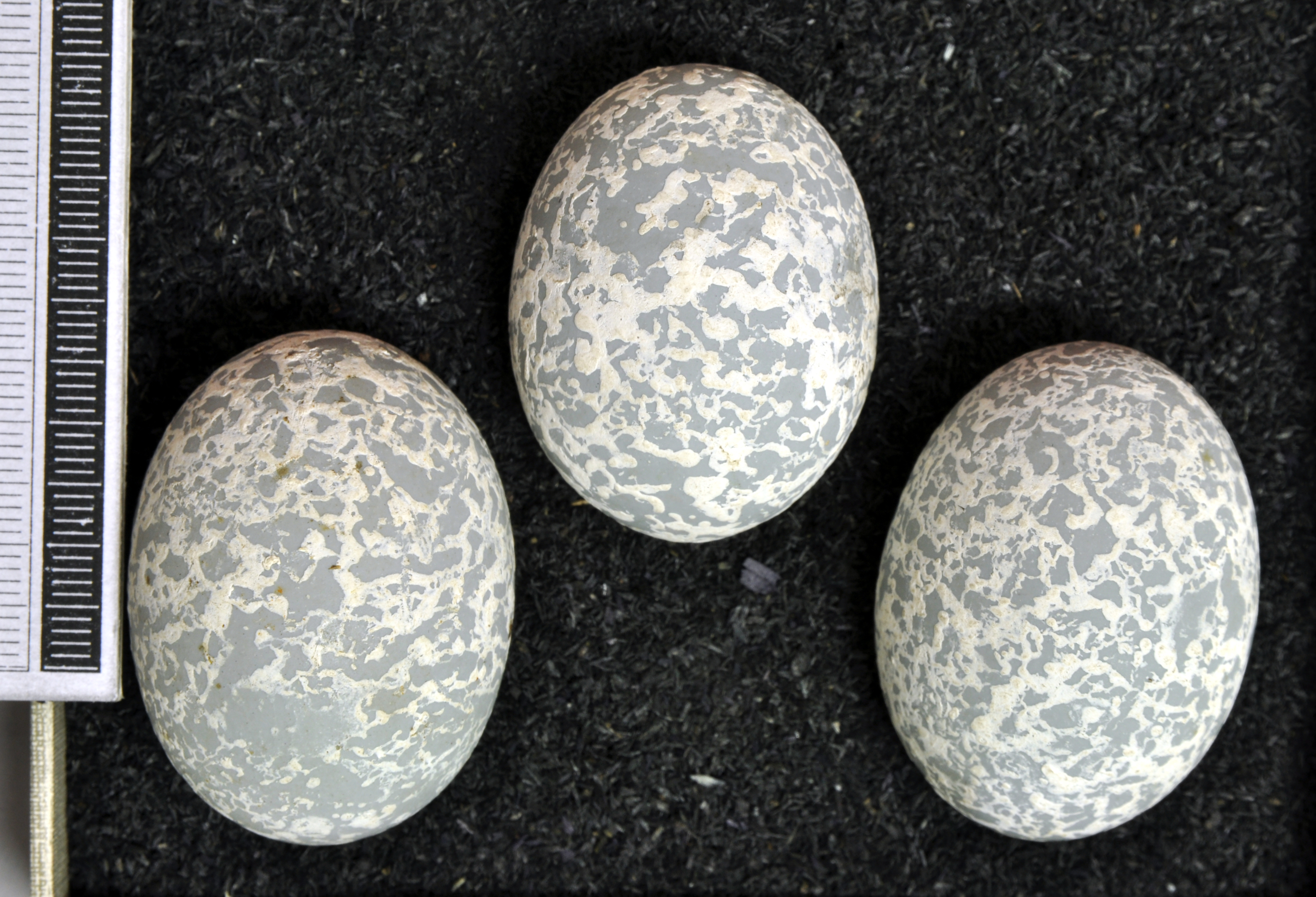
Eggs, Collection Museum Wiesbaden

The nest is built on a tree fork 2 to 5 m (6.6 to 16.4 ft) from the ground. The eggs (from 5 to 7) are dark green and covered with a chalky layer. They are incubated either in individual or community nests; in the latter one can find up to 20 eggs. Under community nests there are many broken eggs. The competition between young being great, mortality is significant.

== Gallery ==
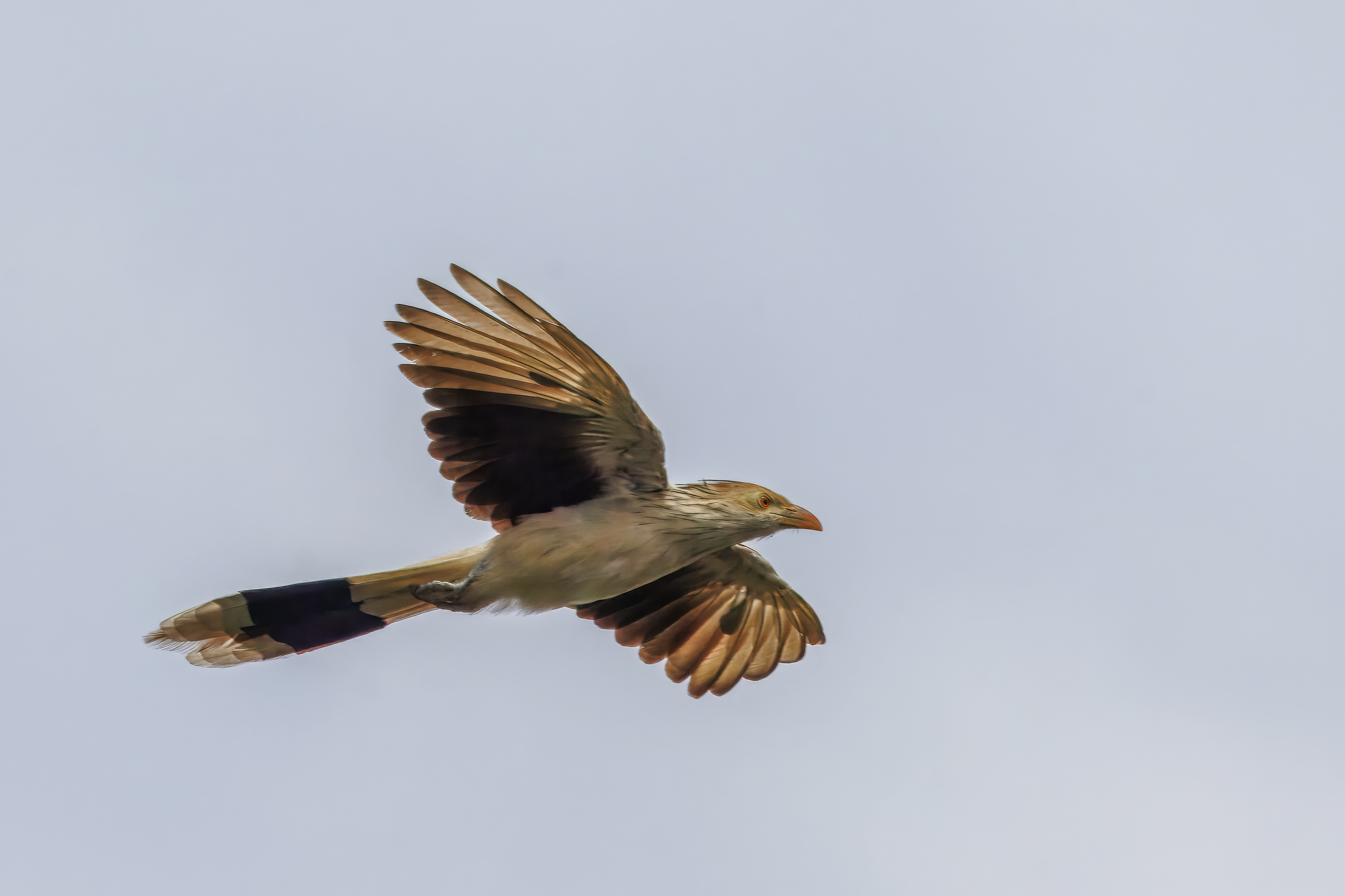
In Campana Partido, Buenos Aires Province, Argentina in 2025

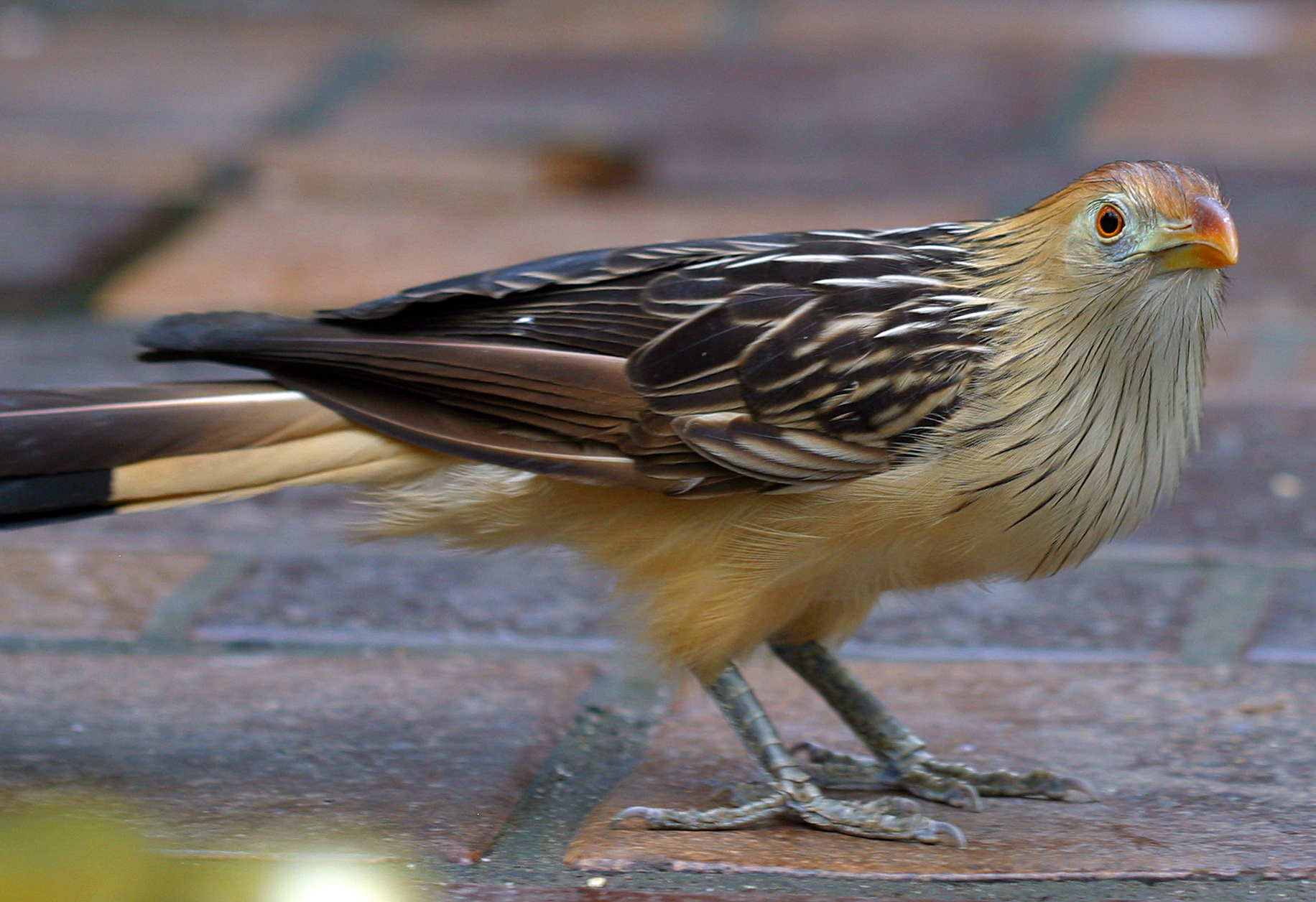
At the National Aviary, Pennsylvania.

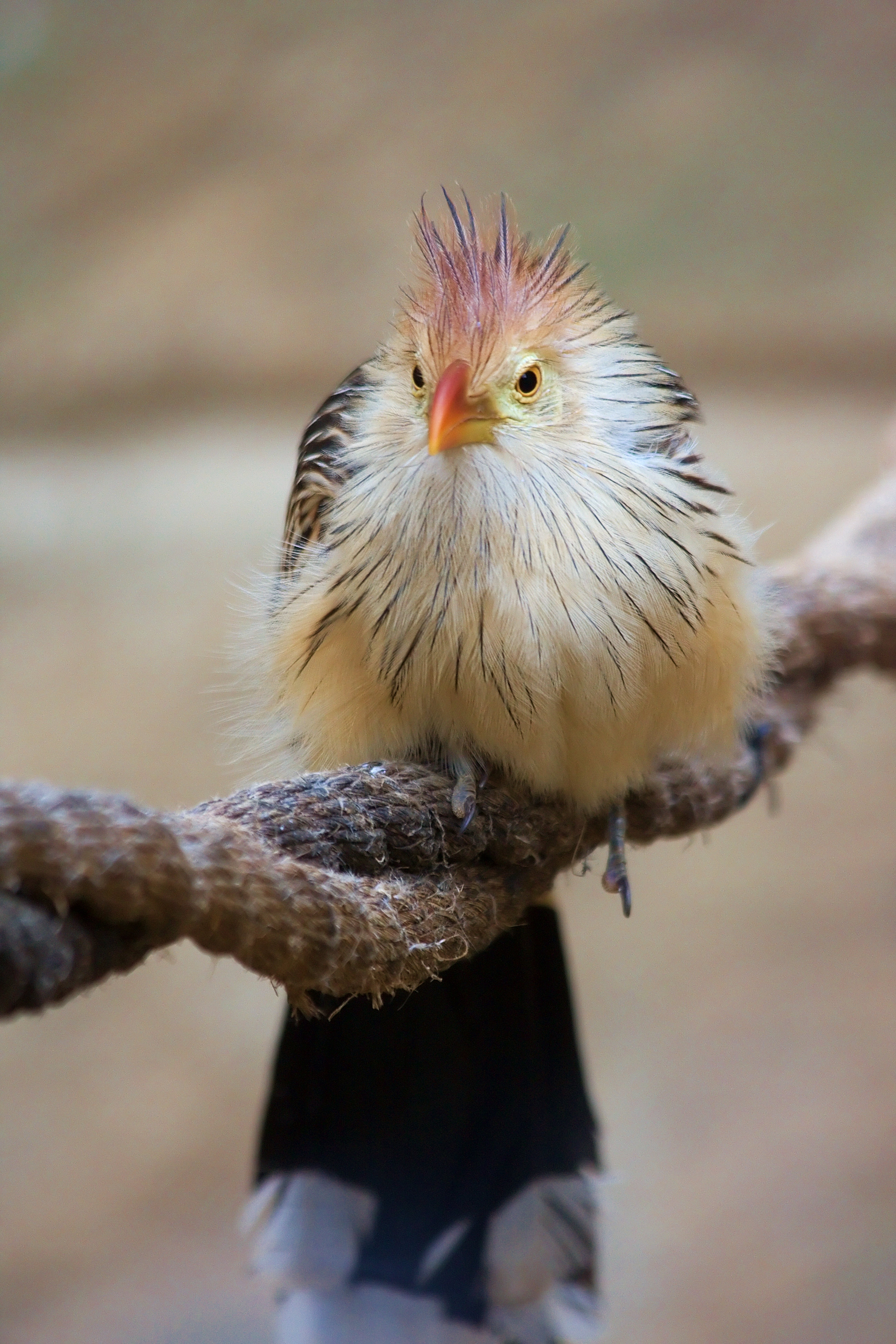
At Amazon World Zoo Park, Isle of Wight

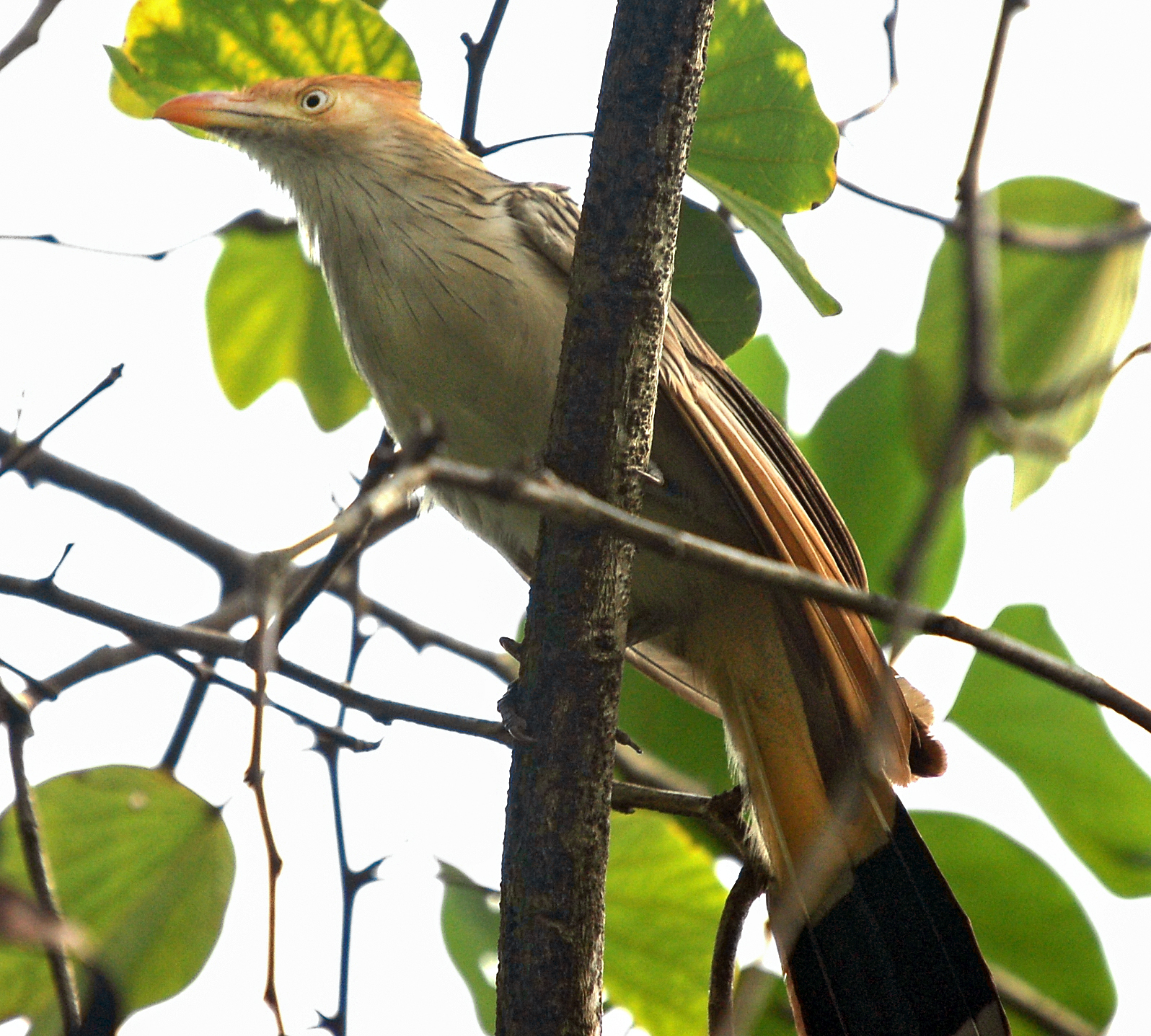
Wild individual in Brazil

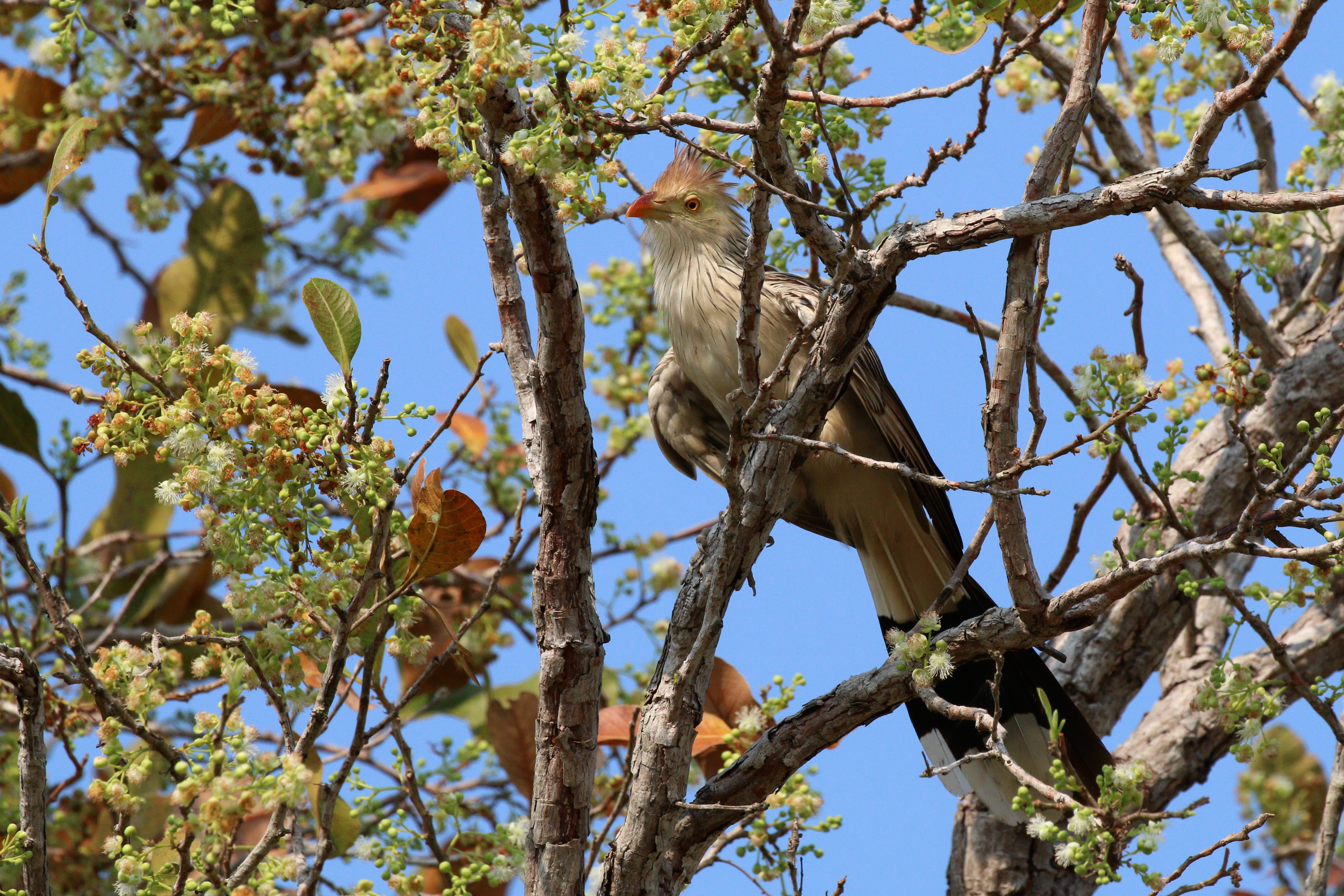
In the Pantanal, Brazil

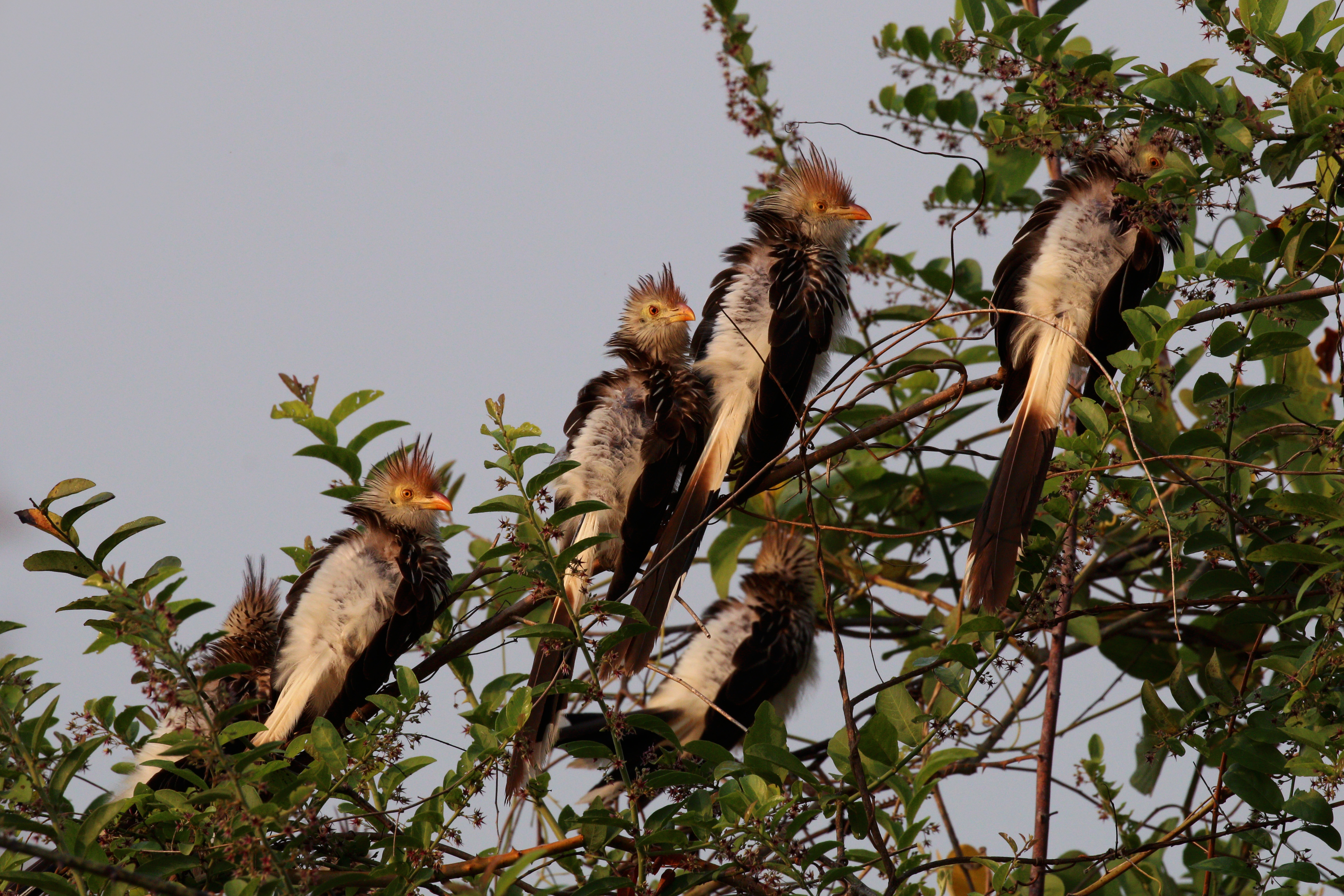
In Pantanal, Brazil

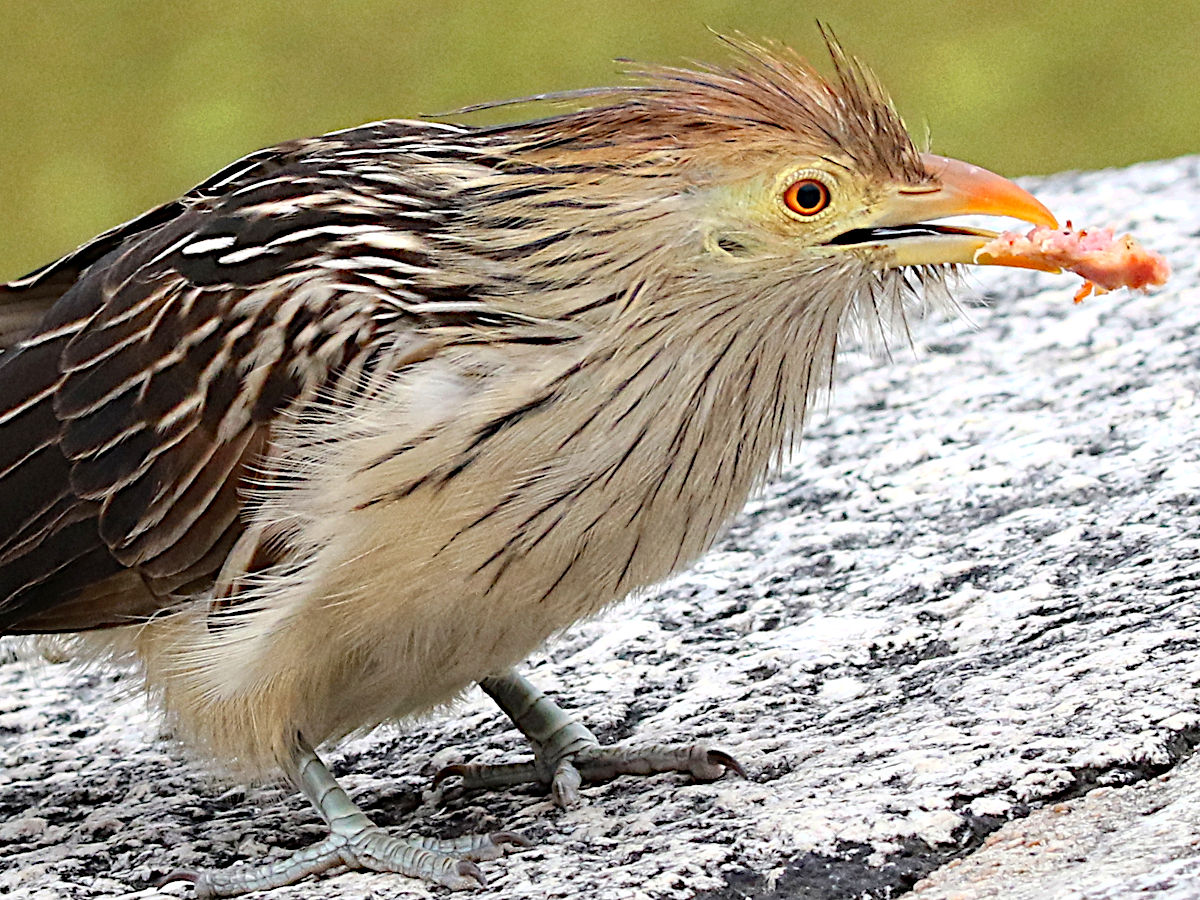
Scavenging at Costanera Sur, Argentina
