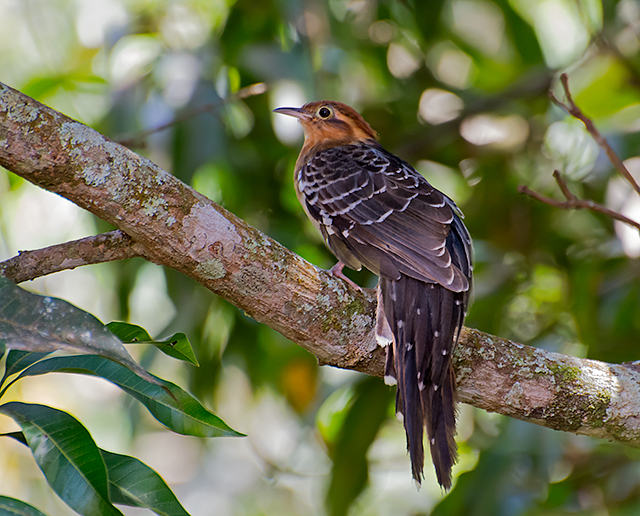
- Pavonine cuckoo at Piraju, São Paulo State, Brazil

Conservation status
- Least Concern (IUCN 3.1)

Scientific classification
- Kingdom: Animalia
- Phylum: Chordata
- Class: Aves
- Order: Cuculiformes
- Family: Cuculidae
- Genus: Dromococcyx
- Species: D. pavoninus

Binomial name
- Dromococcyx pavoninus Pelzeln, 1870

= Pavonine cuckoo =

Species of bird

The pavonine cuckoo (Dromococcyx pavoninus) is a Neotropical cuckoo with a long graduated tail and a short crest. It is one of three species of Neotropical cuckoo which are known to be brood parasites.

== Description ==
The head and crest of this bird is rusty brown and the remaining plumage is mainly dark brown above and paler below, with a rich buff coloured supercilium, throat and breast. It is similar in appearance to the pheasant cuckoo but has a slightly different call and is larger overall. Additionally, the buff supercilium, throat and breast of the pheasant cuckoo is paler than in the pavonine cuckoo and the throat and breast of the pheasant cuckoo are heavily marked while those areas of the pavonine cuckoo have no dark spots or streaks.

== Distribution and habitat ==
The pavonine cuckoo inhabits the understorey of subtropical or tropical moist lowland forests and subtropical or tropical moist montane forests in South America, where it is found in Argentina, Bolivia, Brazil, Colombia, Ecuador, French Guiana, Guyana, Paraguay, Peru, and Venezuela. It has a wide range but a patchy distribution, being absent from some areas where it might have been expected to be present.

== Behaviour ==
Little is known of the behaviour of this widespread, but shy and skulking, bird, which people hear far more often than they see. It appears to be a mainly solitary species. It has a curious appearance when in flight, resembling the flapping wings of a butterfly. The tail is spread and the wingbeats are slow and measured, and there is a brief pause when they are at the top of their beat above the bird.

=== Breeding ===
The pavonine cuckoo is a brood parasite, a rare breeding strategy in the Amazon. Among its known host species which includes drab-breasted bamboo tyrant, ochre-faced tody-flycatcher, eared pygmy tyrant and plain antvireo. As with other parasitic cuckoos, parental care of eggs and young is provided by the host species. The female lays a single egg per parasitised nest; unlike other cuckoos the eggs are not very similar to the eggs of the host. On hatching the cuckoo chick kills any host chicks or removes their eggs. Chicks remain in their host's nests for 24 days after hatching.

=== Feeding ===
It diet is little known but consists mainly of insects. mostly orthoptera. It is normally seen on the ground or in forest understorey, which is probably where it hunts for its insect food.

== Status ==
The pavonine cuckoo is listed by the IUCN as being of "Least Concern". No particular threats have been identified and the bird has a wide range and presumed large population. The population trend is likely to be downward but not at such a rate as to justify putting this bird in a more threatened category.
