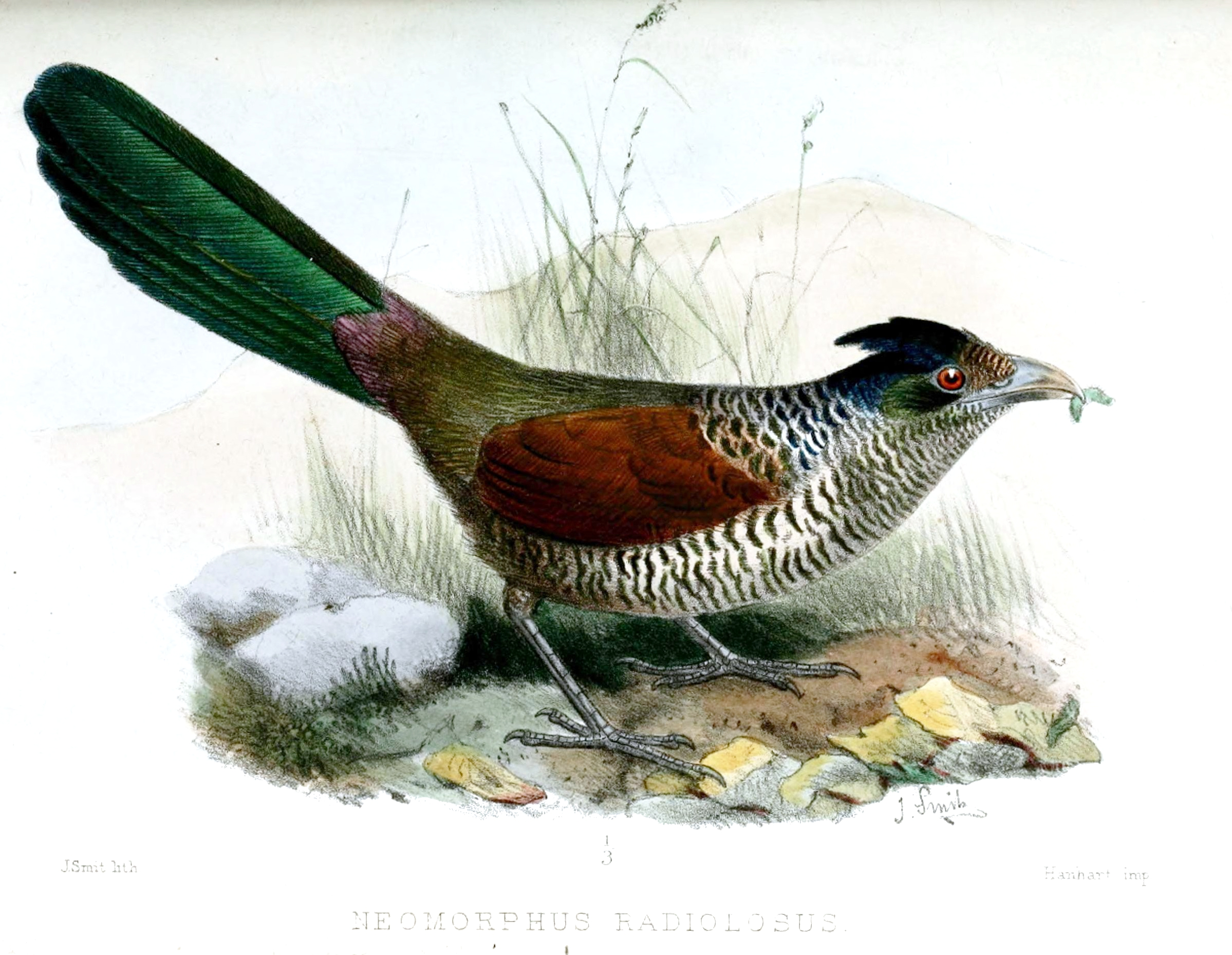

Conservation status
- Vulnerable (IUCN 3.1)

Scientific classification
- Kingdom: Animalia
- Phylum: Chordata
- Class: Aves
- Order: Cuculiformes
- Family: Cuculidae
- Genus: Neomorphus
- Species: N. radiolosus

Binomial name
- Neomorphus radiolosus Sclater, PL & Salvin, 1878

= Banded ground cuckoo =

Species of bird

The banded ground cuckoo (Neomorphus radiolosus) is a vulnerable species of cuckoo in the tribe Neomorphini of subfamily Crotophaginae. It is found in Colombia and Ecuador.

== Taxonomy and systematics ==
The banded ground cuckoo is monotypic. It shares genus Neomorphus with three or four other species depending on the chosen taxonomic system.

== Description ==
The banded ground cuckoo is about 46 cm (18 in) long, about half of which is its tail, and weighs about 400 g (14 oz). Adults have a heavy decurved bill with a black to dusky maxilla and a grayish mandible tipped with blue-gray. Males and females have the same plumage. Adults have a black forehead and crown and a shaggy, glossy, blue-black, erectile crest. Their face is dark with bare blue skin behind the eye. Their hindneck is glossy blue-black and their upper back black with white edges giving a scaly appearance. Their lower back and rump are rich maroon-chestnut and their uppertail coverts metallic green. Their tail is black with a purple and green gloss on the upper side. Their wings have black outer primaries and purplish-red and black inner primaries and secondaries. Their underparts except the undertail coverts are black with the same scaly appearance as the lower back; the coverts are plain black. Juveniles' scaling is mostly ochraceous with some white on the breast and their crest is blackish without blue.

== Distribution and habitat ==
The banded ground cuckoo is found in the Chocó Ecoregion on the Pacific slope of southern Colombia and far northern Ecuador. It is "rare and localized, and occurs at very low density throughout its distribution." It inhabits wet to very wet tropical primary forest. In elevation it mostly ranges between 700 and 1,200 m (2,300 and 3,900 ft) though it has been observed both higher and lower.

== Behavior ==
=== Movement ===
The banded ground cuckoo is a year-round resident throughout its range.

=== Locomotion ===
The banded ground cuckoo is almost exclusively terrestrial, though it may fly into a tree to escape a predator or to roost. It mostly walks or runs on the forest floor and makes hops to catch prey.

=== Feeding ===
The banded ground cuckoo forages mostly by sprinting along the forest floor with abrupt stops to scan for and capture prey. It also hops onto low branches to pluck prey from vegetation. Its diet is mostly insects. It also includes significant amounts of other arthropods; small vertebrates like lizards, amphibians, and small birds; and sometimes fallen fruits. It often follows army ant swarms with other ant-following birds to catch prey fleeing from the ants. It has also been observed following peccary herds, apparently for the same purpose.

=== Breeding ===
The banded ground cuckoo's breeding season is not fully known but appears to include at least March to June. Only two nests have been fully described. They were made mostly of fern leaves with no supporting structure, placed in forks of fairly large branches near the trunks of medium-sized trees, and were 3.9 and 5.4 m (10 and 20 ft) above the ground. Each held only one egg. Both parents incubated the egg and cared for the hatchling. The incubation period was at least 13 days and the time to fledging was 20 days.

=== Vocal and non-vocal sounds ===
The banded ground cuckoo's principal vocalization "resembles a deep moo of a cow" that rises and falls and repeats about every five seconds. Pairs and family groups call to each other while foraging out of sight of one another. They also make a dry clacking sound by clapping their bill.

Banded ground cuckoos have been observed to mimic peccaries acoustically, perhaps for two reasons. Peccaries are able to defend their herd from predators, so mimicking peccaries would trick predators into believing that peccaries are near. Doing so may also benefit both species by warning the other of nearby predators.

== Status ==
The IUCN originally assessed the banded ground cuckoo as Threatened, then in 1994 as Endangered, in 2000 as Vulnerable, in 2009 again as Endangered, and as of 2024 the species has returned to Vulnerable. It has a limited range and very specific habitat requirements. Its estimated population of between 2,500 and 12,000 mature individuals is fragmented and is believed to be decreasing. Its habitat is being degraded across its range, and it is also hunted for food.
