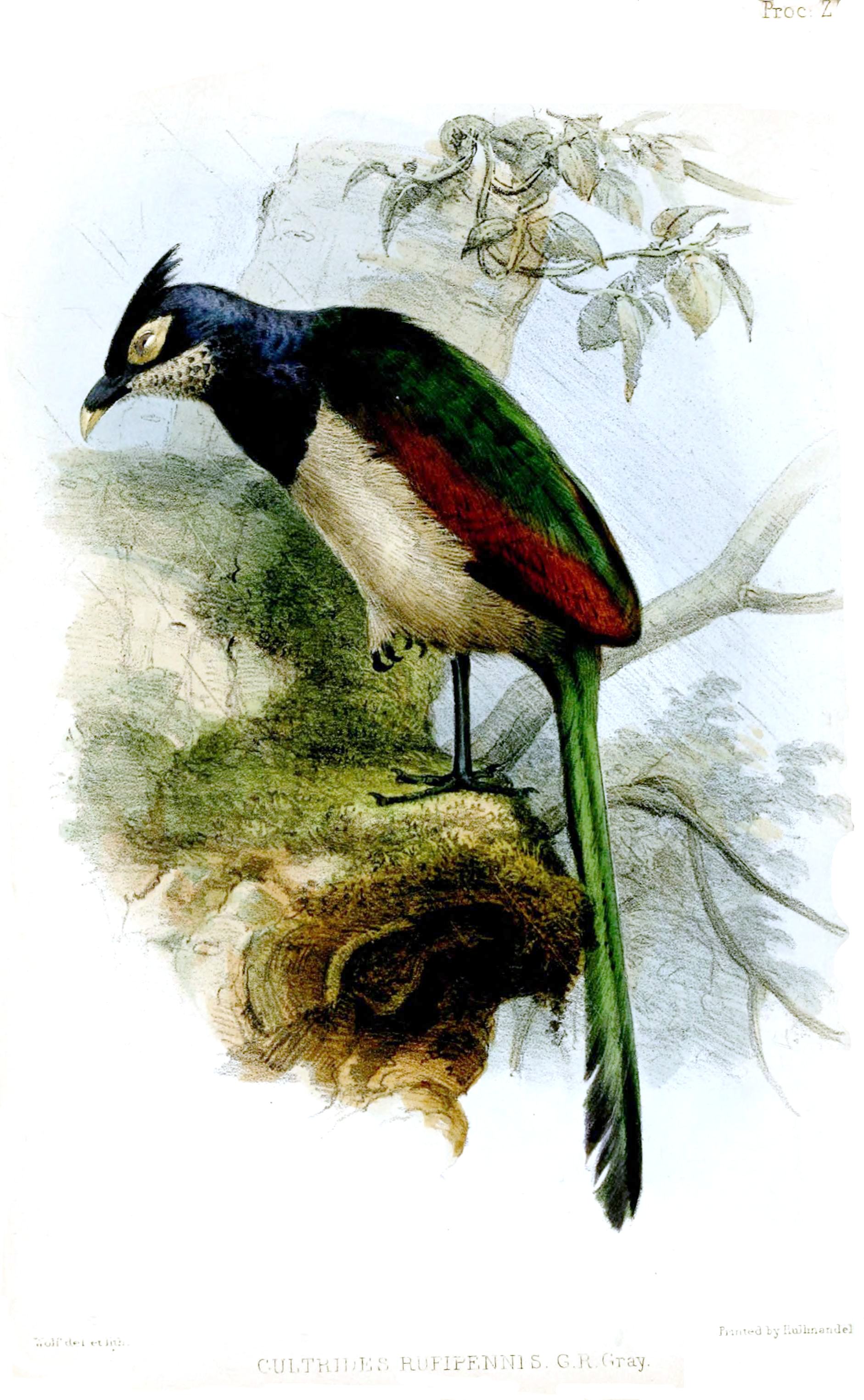
- Illustration based on specimen. The skin around the eyes is red in living individuals

Conservation status
- Least Concern (IUCN 3.1)

Scientific classification
- Kingdom: Animalia
- Phylum: Chordata
- Class: Aves
- Order: Cuculiformes
- Family: Cuculidae
- Genus: Neomorphus
- Species: N. rufipennis

Binomial name
- Neomorphus rufipennis (Gray, 1849)

= Rufous-winged ground cuckoo =

Species of bird

The rufous-winged ground cuckoo (Neomorphus rufipennis) is a species of cuckoo in the tribe Neomorphini of subfamily Crotophaginae. It is found in Brazil, Guyana, Venezuela, and possibly Colombia.

== Taxonomy and systematics ==
The rufous-winged ground cuckoo is monotypic. However, at times the population in the western part of its range was treated as a separate species and also as a subspecies of the rufous-winged.

== Description ==
The rufous-winged ground cuckoo is 48 to 56 cm (19 to 22 in) long, about half of which is its tail. Males weigh about 435 g (15 oz) and females about 325 g (11 oz). Adults have a heavy decurved bill that is black with a greenish to greenish white tip on the maxilla. The sexes are alike. They have a deep purplish blue head, crest, neck, and upper back and olive lower back and uppertail coverts. Their inner tail feathers are metallic purple and the outer ones black with a green gloss. Their wings' primaries are bluish black and the secondaries dark brownish red. They have bare red to reddish-violet skin around and behind the eye. Their throat is ashy to dark gray with black borders on the lower feathers that give a scaly appearance. Their upper breast is black, the lower breast and belly dull ashy brown to slate gray, and the undertail coverts slate gray. Juveniles have mostly brownish slate upperparts with a black lower back and rump and slate underparts.

== Distribution and habitat ==
The rufous-winged ground cuckoo is found primarily in the eastern Venezuelan states of Bolívar and Amazonas, western Guyana, and far northwestern Brazil. A sight record in Colombia leads the South American Classification Committee of the American Ornithological Society to treat it as hypothetical in that country. That committee has not evaluated another sight record from Suriname. The species inhabits mature undisturbed evergreen forest and upland terra firme forest. In elevation it ranges the foothill zone between 100 and 1,100 m (330 and 3,600 ft).

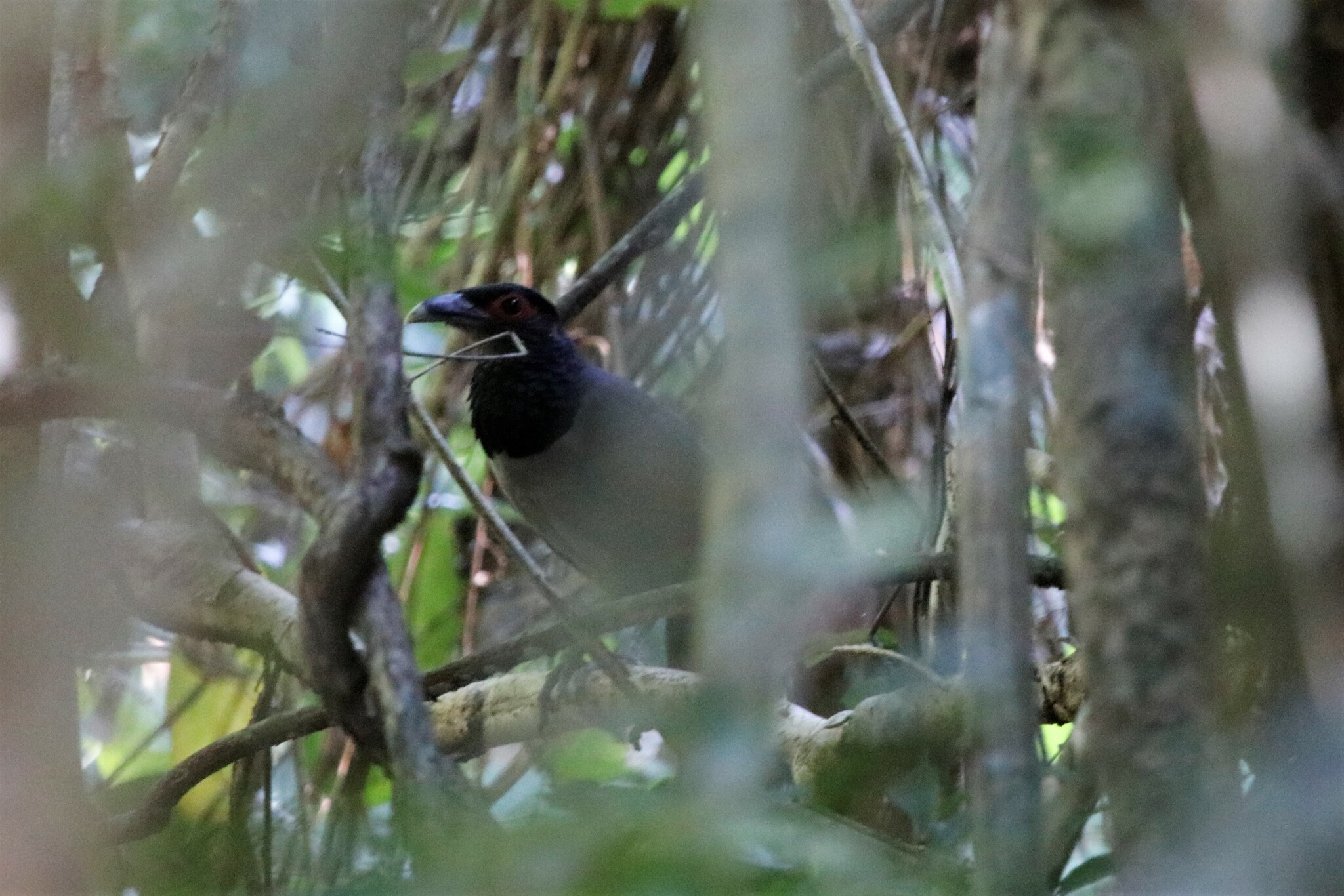
Live bird

== Behavior ==
=== Movement ===
The rufous-winged ground cuckoo is a year-round resident throughout its range.

=== Locomotion ===
The rufous-winged ground cuckoo is almost exclusively terrestrial, though it may fly low to the ground or into a tree to escape a predator or hop to low branches. It mostly walks or runs on the forest floor and makes leaps to catch prey.

=== Feeding ===
The rufous-winged ground cuckoo's diet is mostly insects. It also includes significant amounts of other arthropods; small vertebrates like lizards, amphibians, and small birds; and sometimes fruits. It often follows army ant swarms and peccaries to catch prey fleeing from them, and monkey troops to feed on fallen fruits.

=== Breeding ===
The rufous-winged ground cuckoo's breeding phenology is almost unknown and its nest has not been described. Its nesting season apparently could span from March to September.

=== Vocalization ===
The rufous-winged ground cuckoo's territorial call is "a loud forceful whOOu" that resembles a dove's call but is clearer and louder and may be repeated for several minutes. Another call is "a low guttural gr'r'r."

They also make a dry clacking sound by clapping their bill that may mimic peccaries. Peccaries are able to defend their herd from predators, so mimicking peccaries could trick predators into believing that peccaries are near. Doing so may also benefit both species by warning the other of nearby predators.

== Status ==
The IUCN has assessed the rufous-winged ground cuckoo as being of Least Concern. It has a large range but its population size is unknown and believed to be decreasing. No immeditate threats have been identified. However, it "is described as a species of high sensitivity with a reliance on primary tropical forest" so deforestation or fragmentation could negatively impact it.
