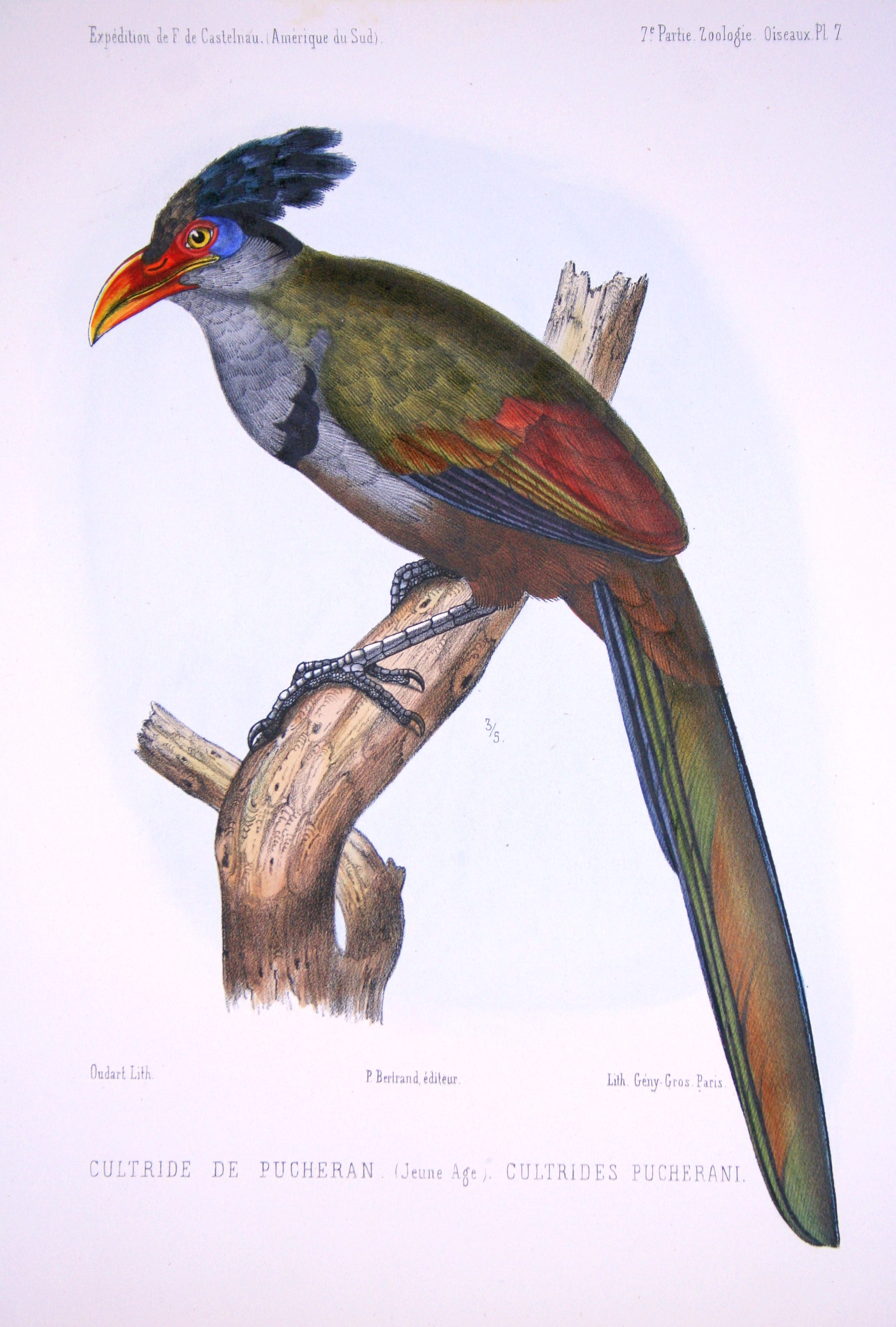

Conservation status
- Least Concern (IUCN 3.1)

Scientific classification
- Kingdom: Animalia
- Phylum: Chordata
- Class: Aves
- Order: Cuculiformes
- Family: Cuculidae
- Genus: Neomorphus
- Species: N. pucheranii

Binomial name
- Neomorphus pucheranii (Deville, 1851)

= Red-billed ground cuckoo =

Species of bird

The red-billed ground cuckoo (Neomorphus pucheranii) is a species of cuckoo in the tribe Neomorphini of subfamily Crotophaginae. It is found in Brazil, Colombia, Peru, and possibly Ecuador.

== Taxonomy and systematics ==
The red-billed ground-cuckoo has two subspecies, the nominate N. p. pucheranii and N. p. lepidophanes.

== Description ==
The red-billed ground cuckoo is 43 to 55 cm (17 to 22 in) long, about half of which is its tail. One male weighed 330 g (12 oz). Adults have a heavy decurved red or orange bill tipped with green or yellow. Males and females of each subspecies have the same plumage. Adults of the nominate subspecies have a dark bluish black crown and shaggy crest with a purple gloss. Their nape and back are olive brown and the rump brown with a bronzy green gloss. Their tail is dark chestnut with an olive green gloss on the upperside of the central feathers. Their wings are mostly rufous; the outer primaries are black with a violet blue gloss. Their face is ashy gray with red lores, red skin around the eye, and bright blue skin behind the eye. Their throat is plain ashy gray, the breast ashy gray with faint black edges to the feathers and a black band below it. Their belly is buffy to light gray and the flanks and undertail coverts dark brownish gray. Juveniles have brown upperparts without gloss, a blackish crest, purplish chestnut wings, black throat and chest, and a brown belly.

Adults of subspecies N. p. lepidophanes are similar, but with a clay-colored breast and belly rather than buffy to light gray. Their breast feathers appear more scaled as well.

== Distribution and habitat ==
The red-billed ground cuckoo is a bird of the upper Amazon basin. The nominate subspecies is found in eastern Peru and western Brazil north of the Amazon River. A sight record in Ecuador leads the South American Classification Committee of the American Ornithological Society to treat it as hypothetical in that country. That committee has not evaluated another sight record from Colombia. Subspecies N. p. lepidophanes is also found in eastern Peru and western Brazil but south of the Amazon. The species inhabits moist lowland evergreen forest, usually that on somewhat hilly terrain with well-drained soil at elevations up to 700 m (2,300 ft).

== Behavior ==
=== Movement ===
The red-billed ground cuckoo is a year-round resident throughout its range.

=== Locomotion ===
The red-billed ground cuckoo is almost exclusively terrestrial, though it may fly low to the ground or into a tree to escape a predator or hop to low branches. It mostly walks or runs on the forest floor and makes leaps to catch prey.

=== Feeding ===
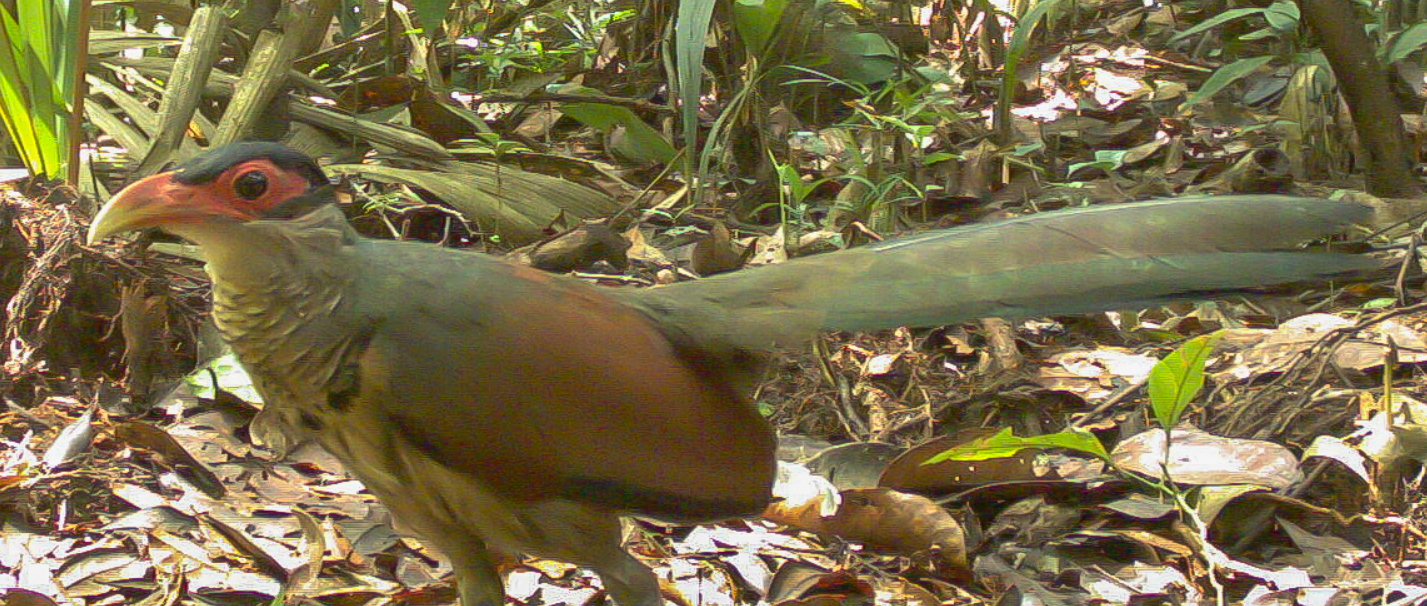
Foraging

The red-billed ground cuckoo's diet has not been extensively studied but is mostly insects. It also includes other arthropods; small vertebrates like lizards, amphibians, and small birds; and sometimes fruits. It follows army ant swarms and peccaries to catch prey fleeing from them, and monkey troops to feed on fallen fruits.

=== Breeding ===
Almost nothing is known about the red-billed ground cuckoo's breeding phenology and its nest has not been described. In 1855 an observer noted a nest with two eggs being incubated by both adults.

=== Vocal and non-vocal sounds ===
The red-billed ground cuckoo's song is "a short (1 sec), deep, rising hoot in a series of about 1 note/2 sec".

Red-billed ground cuckoos have been observed to mimic peccaries acoustically, perhaps for two reasons. Peccaries are able to defend their herd from predators, so mimicking peccaries would trick predators into believing that peccaries are near. Doing so may also benefit both species by warning the other of nearby predators.

== Status ==
The IUCN has assessed the red-billed ground cuckoo as being of Least Concern. It has a very large range, and though its population size is not known it is believed to be stable. No immediate threats have been identified. "However, the reliance of Red-billed Ground-Cuckoo on tropical evergreen forest suggests that it could be susceptible to loss of habitat through deforestation and forest fragmentation."
