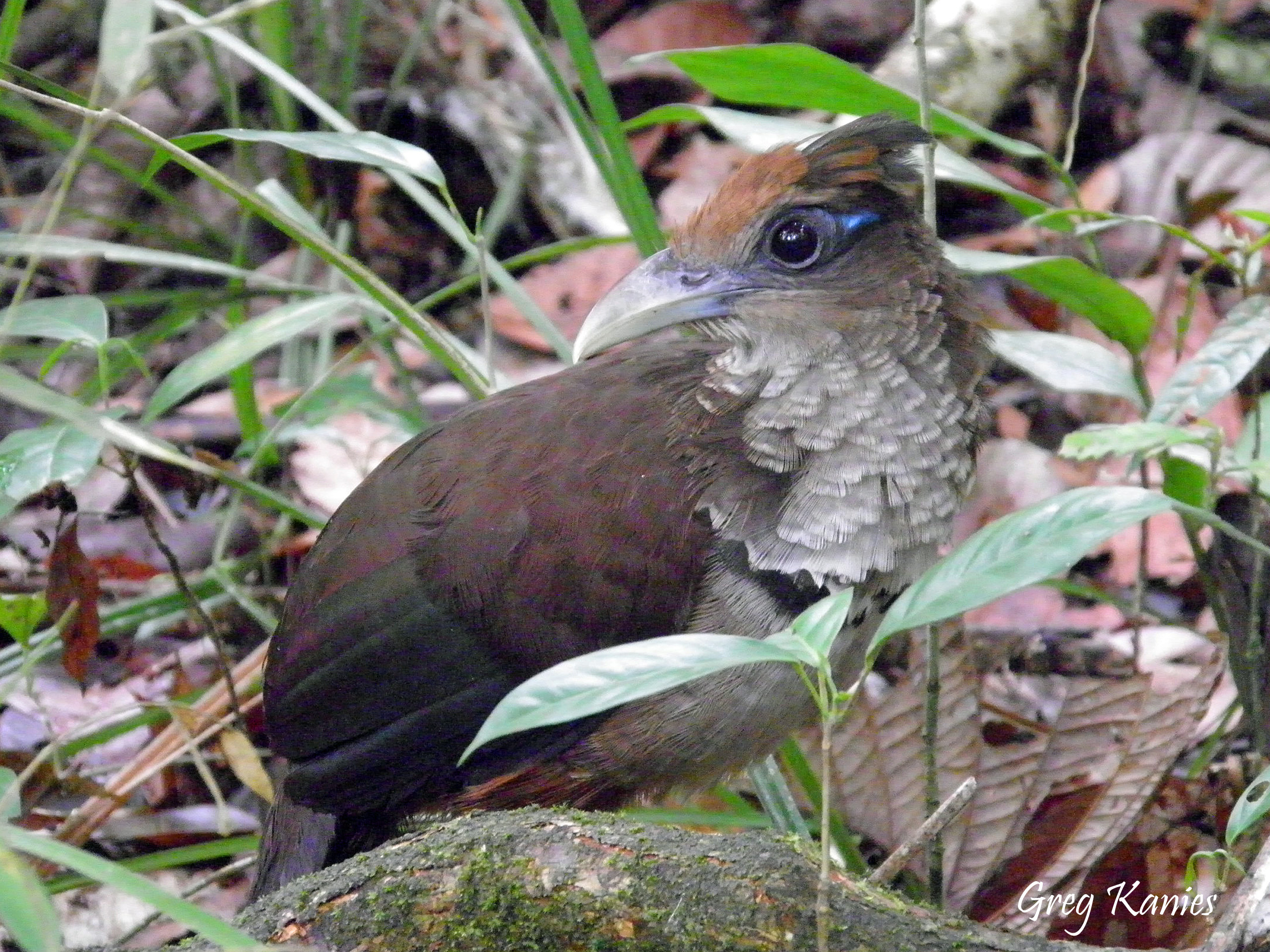

Conservation status
- Vulnerable (IUCN 3.1)

Scientific classification
- Kingdom: Animalia
- Phylum: Chordata
- Class: Aves
- Order: Cuculiformes
- Family: Cuculidae
- Genus: Neomorphus
- Species: N. geoffroyi

Binomial name
- Neomorphus geoffroyi (Temminck, 1820)

= Rufous-vented ground cuckoo =

Species of bird

The rufous-vented ground cuckoo (Neomorphus geoffroyi) is a Vulnerable species of cuckoo in the tribe Neomorphini of subfamily Crotophaginae. It is found in Bolivia, Brazil, Colombia, Costa Rica, Ecuador, Nicaragua, Panama, and Peru.

== Taxonomy and systematics ==
Most taxonomic systems assign these six subspecies to the rufous-vented ground cuckoo:

- N. g. salvini Sclater, P.L., 1866
- N. g. aequatorialis Chapman, 1923
- N. g. australis Carriker, 1935
- N. g. amazonicus Pinto, 1964
- N. g. geoffroyi (Temminck, 1820)
- N. g. dulcis Snethlage, E., 1927

The International Ornithological Committee's Handbook of the Birds of the World adds a seventh, N. g. squamiger, that the other systems treat as the separate species scaled ground cuckoo.

In the early 20th century subspecies N. g. salvini was considered by some authors as a separate species but that treatment did not gain wide acceptance.

== Description ==
The rufous-vented ground cuckoo is 45 to 51 cm (18 to 20 in) long, about half of which is its tail, and weighs about 300 to 400 g (11 to 14 oz). Adults have a heavy decurved bill that is pale grayish green to horn-colored at its base with a yellow tip. All subspecies have a shaggy, glossy blue-black, erectile crest, bright blue skin surrounding the eye, and a rufous vent area. The sexes have similar plumage. Adults of the nominate subspecies N. g. geoffroyi have a cinnamon brown forehead, crown, and lower face; bronzy olive green upperparts and wings; and a glossy purple tail. Their chin, throat, and upper breast are light buffy with a black band across the chest. The rest of their underparts are pale buff. Their head and breast have heavy paler semicircles that give a scaled appearance.

Subspecies N. g. salvini has dark bronze-brown upperparts with a purple sheen, especially on the wings and tail. The tail's upper surface may have some green gloss as well. Its face and breast have fainter scaling than the nominate and its underparts are pale buff to grayish. N. g. aequatorialis has a brown forehead and crown, bronzy green wings and upperparts, and a wide black breast band. The scaling on its breast is faint. N. g. australis has a dark brown forehead and crown and a pale grayish throat and central breast with heavily marked sides. N. g. amazonicus has black barring on a light forehead and crown, a green gloss on the hindneck, wings, and upperparts, and a faint purple gloss on the tail's upper surface. Its underparts are pale gray to whitish buff with heavy scaling on the breast. N. g. dulcis has dark glossy blue wings and upperparts and darker underparts than the nominate with heavy scaling on the breast.

== Distribution and habitat ==
The subspecies of rufous-vented ground cuckoo are found thus:

- N. g. salvini, from Nicaragua south through Costa Rica and Panama and down the Pacific coast of Colombia
- N. g. aequatorialis, southeastern Colombia south to eastern Ecuador and into northern Peru
- N. g. australis, southeastern Peru and northwestern Bolivia
- N. g. amazonicus, Amazonian Brazil south of the Amazon River between the Madeira River and Maranhão state
- N. g. geoffroyi, eastern Brazil's Bahia state
- N. g. dulcis, southeastern Brazil from Espírito Santo south to Rio de Janeiro

The species generally inhabits mature undisturbed evergreen forest. It can also be found in riverside forest, seasonally flooded forest, and sometimes in dry forest, canebrakes, and thickets. In Central America it ranges in elevation from sea level to 1,450 m (4,800 ft). In South America it ranges from sea level in Brazil to 1,650 m (5,400 ft) in Bolivia.

== Behavior ==
=== Movement ===
The rufous-vented ground cuckoo is a year-round resident throughout its range.

=== Locomotion ===
The rufous-vented ground cuckoo is almost exclusively terrestrial, though it may fly low to the ground or into a tree to escape a predator. It mostly walks or runs on the forest floor and makes powerful leaps to catch prey.

=== Feeding ===
The rufous-vented ground cuckoo's diet is mostly insects. It also includes significant amounts of other arthropods; small vertebrates like lizards, amphibians, and small birds; and sometimes fallen fruits. It often follows army ant swarms, peccaries, and monkey troops to catch prey fleeing from them.

=== Breeding ===
The rufous-vented ground cuckoo's breeding seasons vary latitudinally, in Central America nesting in the northern summer and in most of South America in the austral summer. It builds a sturdy nest of large sticks with a flatish cup of dry grass and fresh leaves. It is usually placed in the fork of a tree or shrub about 2 to 3 m (7 to 10 ft) above the ground. All of the documented nests contained a single egg. Incubation is believed to be by both parents, but the incubation period and time to fledging are not known. The latter is thought to be similar to the 20 day period of other Neomorphus cuckoos.

=== Vocalization ===
The rufous-vented ground cuckoo's principal vocalization is "a low, drawn out, moaning coo: ooooooooooooooooop". At army ant swarms they give "a muffled, barking woof call" and also "a sharp, loud kchak! call", apparently to move other birds away from desired prey.

== Status ==
The IUCN has assessed the rufous-vented ground cuckoo as Vulnerable. Its population is estimated at between 63,000 and 127,000 mature individuals and is believed to be decreasing. It has wide but disjunct range. The principal threat is habitat fragmentation, because the species requires large undisturbed forest. It "is often one of the first species to disappear when formerly suitable habitat is fragmented."
