= Amazon World Zoo Park =

Zoo on the Isle of Wight, England

Amazon World Zoo
- Amazon World Zoo logo
- Interactive map of Amazon World Zoo
- 50°39′21″N 1°13′12″W
- Location: Isle of Wight, England
- Major exhibits: South America and Rainforest animals
- Website: www.amazonworld.co.uk

Amazon World Zoo Park is a medium-sized zoo located in Newchurch, on the outskirts of Sandown, Isle of Wight. It became a charity in 2024, adopting the name Amazon Rainforest Conservation Centre.

The collection is based around the animals of the Amazon rainforest and as such features a variety of exotic animals from South America, including Giant Anteaters, Ocelots, Armadillos, Sloths, Capybara and Tapirs.

The zoo originated as a private bird collection and grew into a Zoo Park open to the public all year round. It was once home to the largest collection of Toucans in the United Kingdom, holding 9 species in all; the collection has dwindled through the years leaving the sole remnant as a single Plate-Billed Mountain Toucan.

The zoo has several rescue animals from the private pet trade, other zoos & collections, where they would have been destroyed for varying reasons, and airport seizures & wild caught animals that are unable to be returned to the wild. The zoo also contributes to several breeding programmes and is a leading breeder of Tamandua and Two-toed Sloths.

In 2005 the zoo was subject to a nationwide media coverage after a baby penguin was stolen from the zoo overnight. The penguin chick was never found but is presumed to have died after being released into the Solent around the Isle of Wight.

Since undergoing new management, the collection has improved remarkably. The zoo is a member of the British and Irish Association of Zoos and Aquariums (BIAZA) and the European Association of Zoos and Aquaria (EAZA) for which it undergoes routine inspections to ensure that it is up to standard and providing correct animal welfare in an ecological way.

== Conservation ==
The zoo contributes to several international breeding programmes including ones for highly endangered species such as the Bali Starling; a species that at one point had a mere 11 left in the wild. It has also had considerable success in breeding the two-toed sloth, a species that is notoriously difficult to breed in captivity.

Amazon World Zoo Park also purchases land in South America through the World Land Trust to help conserve the South American natural habitat for the animals they house and care for.

== Rescue ==
The zoo has a large number of rescue animals within the collection. A large number of their reptile and bird collection are ex-pets and RSPCA rescues that have been donated and rehomed to the zoo where they can receive specialised care and be allowed to live more naturally.

They also have a few airport seizures, many of whom have been smuggled into the country for the illegal pet trade and have sustained injuries from their capture or transport making them unable to be returned into the wild.

== Penguin theft ==
Toga was an African penguin who was stolen from the zoo. Toga was the first South African jackass penguin bred at the zoo.

On 19 December 2005, burglars stole Toga. It is supposed that the thieves scaled a 6-foot (1.8 m) outer wall before climbing over an 8-foot (2.4 m) metal fence. Katherine Bright, manager at Amazon World at the time, said: "Toga was last seen at 4.30pm on Saturday."

As the penguin refuses food from humans it is unlikely to survive more than a few days away from its parents. The zoo initially offered a reward of £1,000, which was swelled by additional offers of money from around the world (including $600 from America). Zoo staff speculated that the film March of the Penguins may have inspired the crime. By Thursday, hopes of finding Toga alive were fading. There was also a caller to the morning television programme GMTV claiming to have dumped the body of Toga in Portsmouth Harbour.

Despite the unlikelihood of success on 27 December, the zoo continued to search for the missing penguin. By 17 January 2006, the zoo staff had given up all hope of ever finding the whereabouts of Toga.

Toga's parents Kyala and Oscar produced two more eggs early 2006 after recovering from the loss of their first born. On 14 February 2006 one of the eggs hatched, they had a female chick who was named Mumbles.

== Species ==
Species include wallabies, pacas, kinkajous, sloths, poison dart frogs, parrots, armadillos, meerkats, Koi carp, Guira cuckoos, and Bali mynas, amongst many others.
