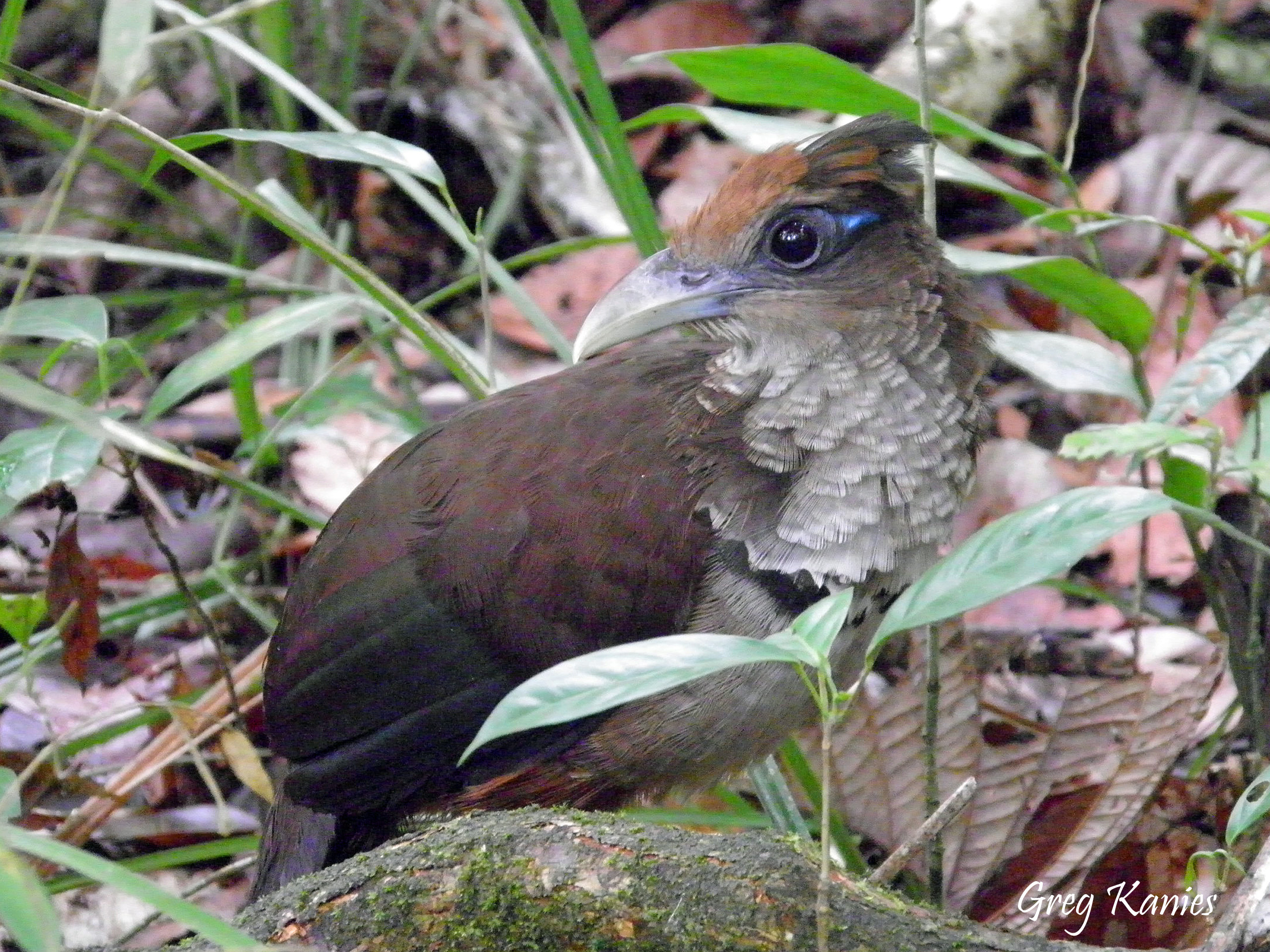
- Rufous-vented ground cuckoo (Neomorphus geoffroyi)

Scientific classification
- Kingdom: Animalia
- Phylum: Chordata
- Class: Aves
- Order: Cuculiformes
- Family: Cuculidae
- Genus: Neomorphus; Gloger, 1827

Type species
- Coccyzus geoffroyi Temminck, 1820

Species
- 4-5, see text

= Neomorphus =

Genus of cuckoos

Neomorphus is a genus of terrestrial cuckoos in the family Cuculidae. Despite their relatively large size, they are highly inconspicuous and rarely seen. They are restricted to the humid primary forests in the Neotropics, and despite their similar looks, not closely related to the Asian ground cuckoos of the genus Carpococcyx.

== Species ==
Image	Scientific name	Common name	Distribution
	Neomorphus geoffroyi	Rufous-vented ground cuckoo	southern Nicaragua, through Costa Rica and Panama, into north-western Colombia
	Neomorphus squamiger	Scaled ground cuckoo	Rio Tapajós in Brazil
	Neomorphus pucheranii	Red-billed ground cuckoo	western Brazil, southeastern Colombia, eastern Ecuador, and northeastern Peru.
	Neomorphus radiolosus	Banded ground cuckoo	the Chocó of western Colombia and Ecuador.
	Neomorphus rufipennis	Rufous-winged ground cuckoo	northern Brazil, Guyana, Venezuela, and Colombia
