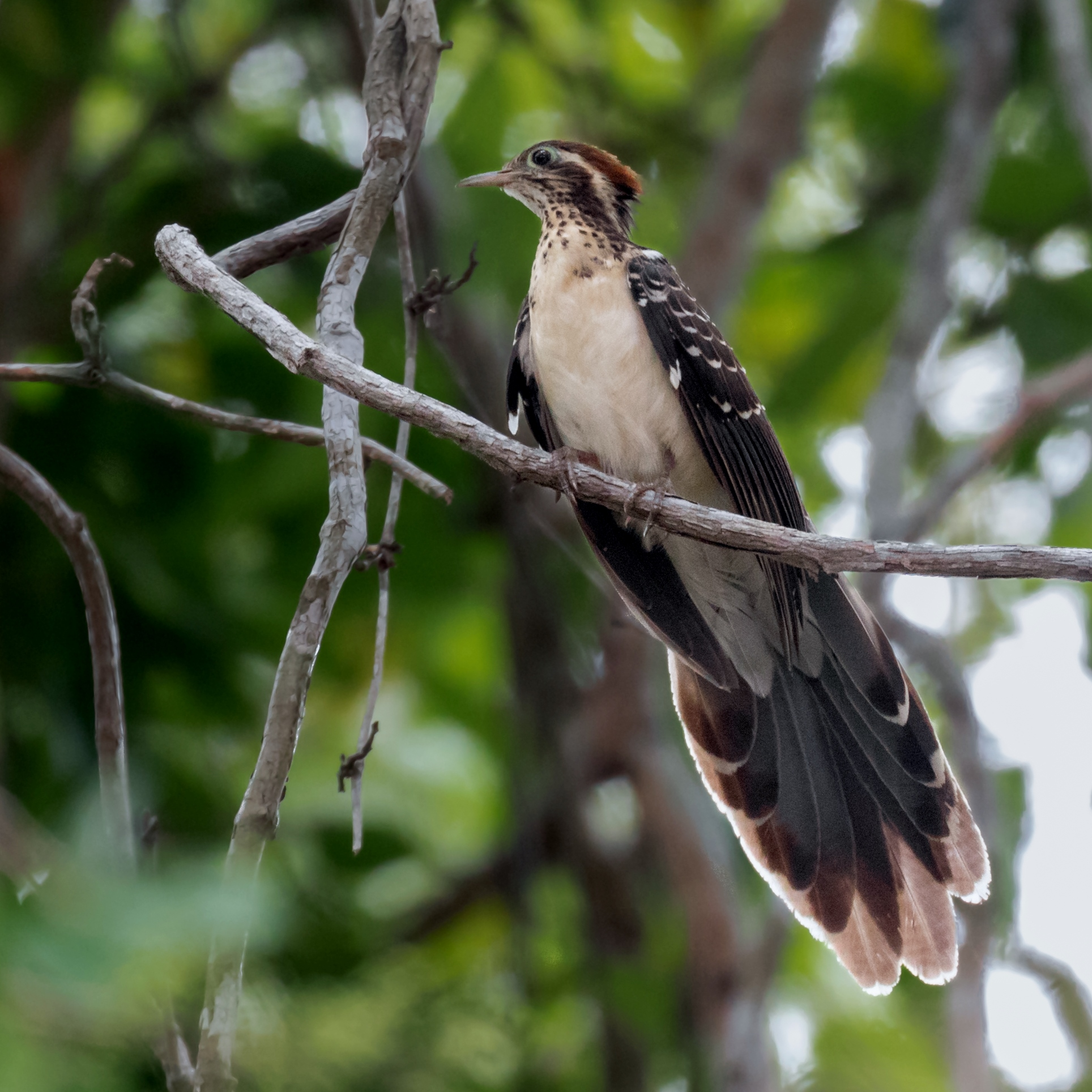
- Pheasant cuckoo (Dromococcyx phasianellus)

Scientific classification
- Kingdom: Animalia
- Phylum: Chordata
- Class: Aves
- Order: Cuculiformes
- Family: Cuculidae
- Genus: Dromococcyx; Wied-Neuwied, 1832

Type species
- Macropus phasianellus von Spix, 1824

= Dromococcyx =

Genus of birds

Dromococcyx is a genus of uncommon to rare cuckoos found in forests and woodlands of the Neotropics. While rarely seen, both species are very vocal. They have strikingly graduated tails, and are among the few cuckoos of the Americas that are brood parasites (the only other is the striped cuckoo).

== Species ==
The genus contains the following species:

Genus Dromococcyx – Wied-Neuwied, 1832 – two species
Common name	Scientific name and subspecies	Range	Size and ecology	IUCN status and estimated population
Pavonine cuckoo	Dromococcyx pavoninus Pelzeln, 1870	Argentina, Bolivia, Brazil, Colombia, Ecuador, French Guiana, Guyana, Paraguay, Peru, and Venezuela	Size: Habitat: Diet:	LC
Pheasant cuckoo	Dromococcyx phasianellus (Spix, 1824)	Central and South America	Size: Habitat: Diet:	LC
