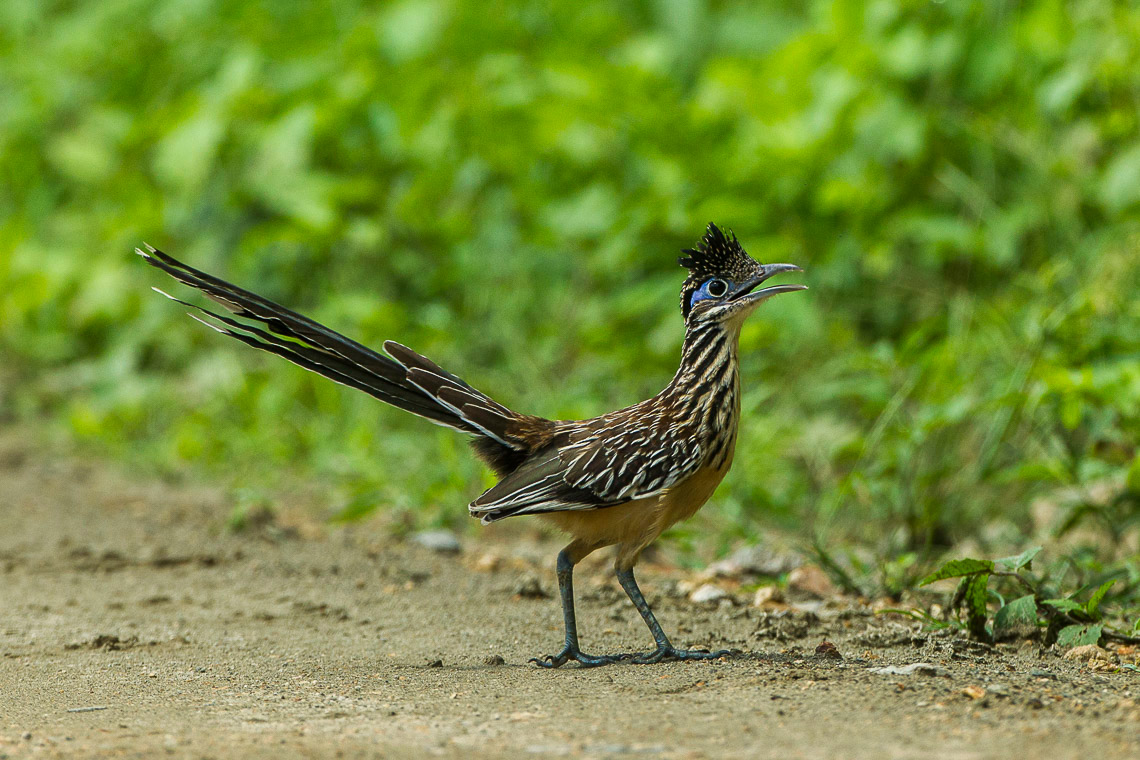

Conservation status
- Least Concern (IUCN 3.1)

Scientific classification
- Kingdom: Animalia
- Phylum: Chordata
- Class: Aves
- Order: Cuculiformes
- Family: Cuculidae
- Genus: Geococcyx
- Species: G. velox

Binomial name
- Geococcyx velox (Wagner, 1836)
- Range in green

= Lesser roadrunner =

Species of bird

The lesser roadrunner (Geococcyx velox) is a large, long-legged bird that is a member of the cuckoo family, Cuculidae. It is found in Mesoamerica. Its Latin name means "swift earth-cuckoo". Along with the greater roadrunner, it is one of two species in the genus Geococcyx.

== Description ==
The lesser roadrunner is a slender bird that reaches a length of 46 to 51 cm (18 in), the tail itself accounting for about 24 cm (9.4 in). Its average length is 46 cm (18 in). The male weighs 174–207 grams (6.1–7.3 oz), while the female weighs 162–192 grams (5.7–6.8 oz).

The crown, crest and neck of the lesser roadrunner are black with a bronze glow and small light brown spots. The back neck is black-brown, with feathers are lined with a pale brown, so that a brown-white dashes arises. The plumage of the upper body is dark brown with light speckles and lightens to maroon towards the rump, and its breast is white. The rectrices are black with a dark purple luster. Young roadrunners resemble adults, but have ocher-colored lines, and duller skin around the eye.

The iris is yellow to brown, with a yellow to silvery-white ring surrounding the pupil. The eye ring is pale lavender to bright blue. The area behind the eye extends to a narrow band that turns into a bright red color on the neck, which is mostly covered by feathers. The upper beak is gray, while the lower beak is bluish-gray.

The lesser roadrunner resembles the greater roadrunner (Geococcyx californianus) in appearance and habit but is smaller, with a less streaked throat and chest, brownish on the rump and on the outer wings and yellowish undersides. The lesser roadrunner also has a significantly shorter bill.

== Habitat ==
The lesser roadrunner occurs in arid lowlands of Mesoamerica up to 3,000 m (9,800 ft) in altitude. It inhabits open ground areas, with scrub and thorny bushes. They can be found in higher elevations of stratovolcanoes such as Conchagua, San Miguel, Santa Ana and San Salvador, in semi-open areas above the treeline. They also adapt to cultivated land such as henequen and corn fields.

Its breeding range is in southwestern Mexico, north into the western side of the Sierra Madre Occidental range, along with northern Central America and a disjunct range in the northern Yucatán Peninsula. It overlaps with the range of the greater roadrunner in a small area in the states of Sonora, Sinaloa, Jalisco, and Michoacán.

== Behavior ==
The lesser roadrunner can run up to 20 mph (32 km/h). It spends most of its time on the ground, running in open areas, along roads, or under cover and is capable of limited flight, perching in bushes or low trees.

Roadrunners bask in the early morning, on a fence post or bush. They cock their tails and droop their wings, then turn their backs towards the sun, raising the scapular feathers and exposing their black skin, which absorbs heat. They may preen themselves, as well.

The bird's call is a series of soft "cooing", about one note per second, made three to seven times on a descending scale.

=== Diet ===
The lesser roadrunner is an opportunistic feeder, which eats seeds, fruit, small reptiles, and frogs. It forages around roadsides for large insects and roadkill. Grasshoppers make up a significant portion part of its diet, as do caterpillars.

=== Nesting ===
Breeding is reported from Mexico between April and July, and in El Salvador in August.

The lesser roadrunner builds its nest in a low tree, a thorn bush, or an Opuntia cactus, about 2 m (6 ft 7 in) off the ground. Its eggs, which are white and 35 mm × 26 mm (1.4 in × 1.0 in) in length, are laid in clutches of two to four. Their nests are smaller than those of the greater roadrunner, but are stronger and more compact, built in the shape of a cup with sturdy grass stems and twigs, with a diameter around 14.5 cm (5.7 in). Both male and female roadrunners incubate.

Lesser roadrunner clutches show less variation in size than those of the greater roadrunner, and from observation, all eggs appear to hatch around the same time.
