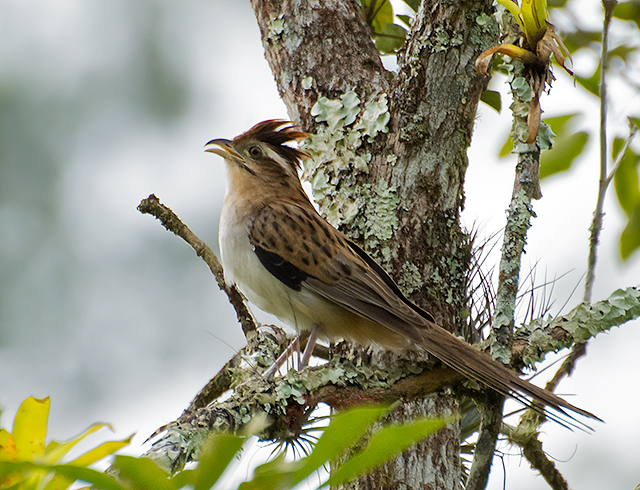

Conservation status
- Least Concern (IUCN 3.1)

Scientific classification
- Kingdom: Animalia
- Phylum: Chordata
- Class: Aves
- Order: Cuculiformes
- Family: Cuculidae
- Genus: Tapera; Thunberg, 1819
- Species: T. naevia

Binomial name
- Tapera naevia (Linnaeus, 1766)

Synonyms
- Cuculus naevius Linnaeus, 1766

= Striped cuckoo =

Species of bird

The striped cuckoo (Tapera naevia) is a bird, the only member of the genus Tapera. This resident cuckoo is found from Mexico and Trinidad south to Bolivia and Argentina and Colombia.

The striped cuckoo is found in open country with trees or shrubs, and the edges of mangrove forests. It is among the very few brood parasitic cuckoos of the Americas (only other are Dromococcyx), and typical hosts are spinetails, but often also wrens, and other species with domed nests. The female cuckoo lays one, sometimes two, white or bluish eggs in the host's large stick nest. The eggs hatch in 15 days, with a further 18 days until the cuckoo fledges. The young spinetails disappear.

This species is about 27 cm (11 in) long and weighs 40 g (1.4 oz). The adult is mainly grey-brown above, streaked with black and buff. It has a pale supercilium and a chestnut and black crest which is raised as part of its display. The underparts are off-white and the tail is long and graduated. Immature birds are spotted with buff and are more rufous on the back and wings.

The striped cuckoo eats large insects (primarily grasshoppers and caterpillars), often taken off the ground. This is a solitary and fairly shy species which tends to keep to the cover of bushes, although it will sing from more open perches. It has a whistled call usually of two or three notes, wu-weee or wu-wu-wee, and can be attracted by imitations of this.

== Brazilian folklore ==
This bird is very important in Brazilian folklore, being related to the legend of the saci, or matita-perê. Other than saci, the bird is also known as matinta-pereira, pitica (Pará), crispim, fenfém, martim-pererê, matimpererê, matintapereira, matintaperera, matitaperê, peitica, peito-ferido, roceiro-planta, seco-fico, sede-sede, saci-do-campo, sem-fim, fém-fém, tempo-quente, bulhões, bolinhas, feijão, feijoada, jotalhão, gansolino, peixe-frito (Bahia), e peixe-frito-seu-veríssimo.

Matita-pereira is famously mentioned in Tom Jobim's song Águas de março.
