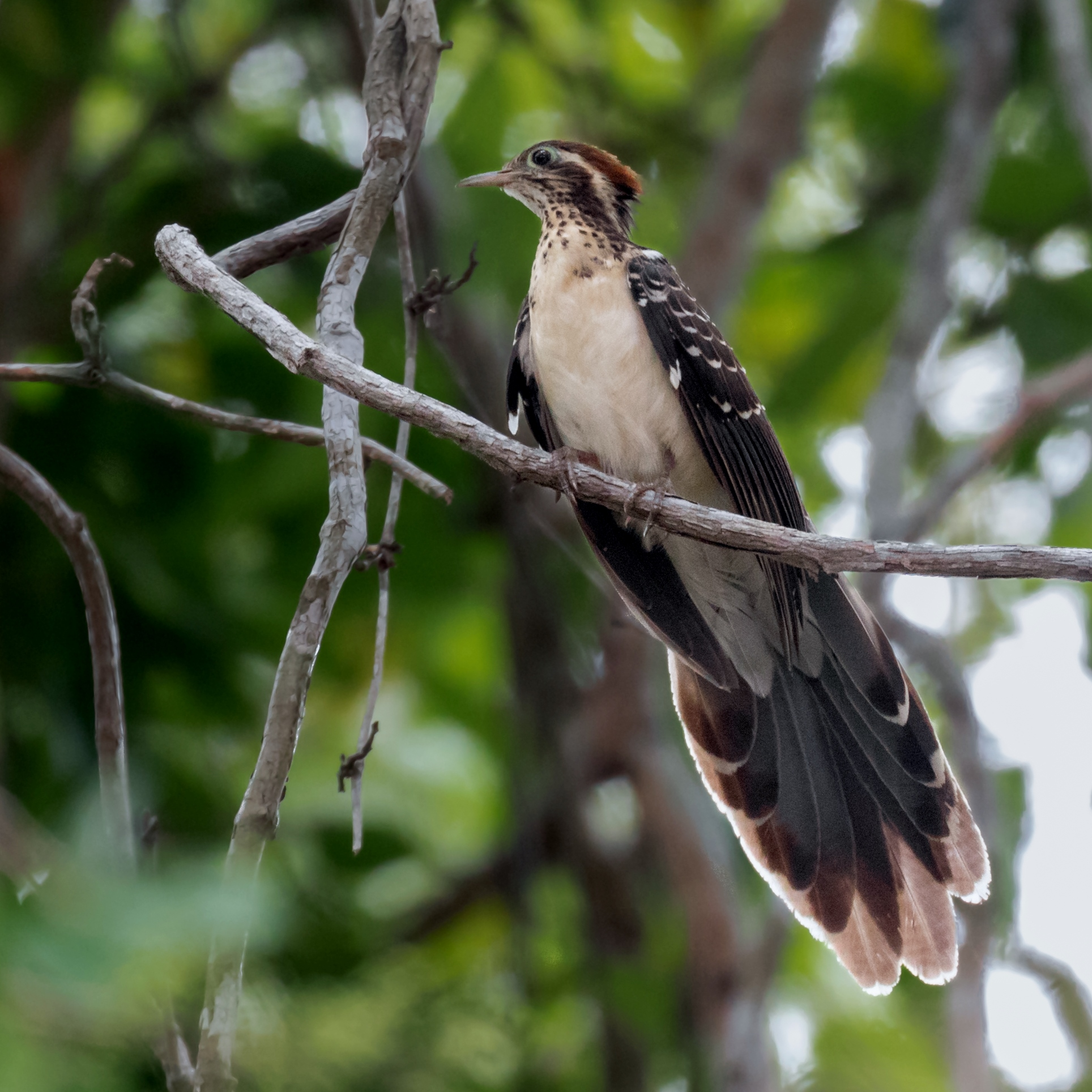

Conservation status
- Least Concern (IUCN 3.1)

Scientific classification
- Kingdom: Animalia
- Phylum: Chordata
- Class: Aves
- Order: Cuculiformes
- Family: Cuculidae
- Genus: Dromococcyx
- Species: D. phasianellus

Binomial name
- Dromococcyx phasianellus (Spix, 1824)

= Pheasant cuckoo =

Species of bird

The pheasant cuckoo (Dromococcyx phasianellus) is a species of neotropical cuckoo in the subfamily Neomorphinae of the family Cuculidae. It is native to Central and South America where it occurs in lowland tropical forest.

== Description ==
The pheasant cuckoo is a large cuckoo with a short crest tipped with rusty brown. The bird's upper parts are dark sooty-brown and the underparts are pale buff with small black streaks on the breast. The feathers of the large tail are of varying lengths, with the central ones being the longest. The call consists of two short whistles, the second being of higher pitch, followed by a trill "whee! whee! wheerr-rr". It can be sung from low, medium, or high perches or from the ground.

== Behaviour ==
=== Breeding ===
The breeding season in Mexico appears to be March through August when the males sing. In Oaxaca breeding is from April to June while in Panama calling most frequent from mid-April to July, i.e. from the onset of wet season. There is little information about territorial behaviour. Males respond to singing males with counter-singing or by a strutting display involving head and crest raised, breast feathers puffed out and wings partially extended to show white spots with tail coverts arched. This display can be performed while voicing low grunts and guttural clicks or silently.

The pheasant cuckoo is one of three New World members of the Cuculidae which is brood parasitic. The precise details of its breeding biology are little known except for a list of known host species including tyrant flycatchers in the genus Myiozetetes, yellow-olive flatbill, eye-ringed flatbill, pied water tyrant and barred antshrike, all of which are sub-oscine passerines. As with other parasitic cuckoos, parental care of eggs and young is provided by the host species.

=== Feeding ===
This is an insectivorous species and its food includes grasshoppers, cicadas and beetles; occasionally also small lizards and nestlings. It has a stylized terrestrial foraging behaviour which includes rattling sounds made by vibrating its plumage and bill clapping while the bird stands with body, wing and tail bobbing before lunging forward with several short steps, before pecking in the leaf litter for potential prey.

== Distribution and habitat ==
The bird's natural habitat is the understorey of tropical lowland evergreen forest, riverine forest, and tropical deciduous forest, from the sea level up to 1600 m. It is found in Argentina, Belize, Bolivia, Brazil, Colombia, Costa Rica, Ecuador, El Salvador, French Guiana, Guatemala, Guyana, Honduras, Mexico, Nicaragua, Panama, Paraguay, Peru, Suriname, and Venezuela.
