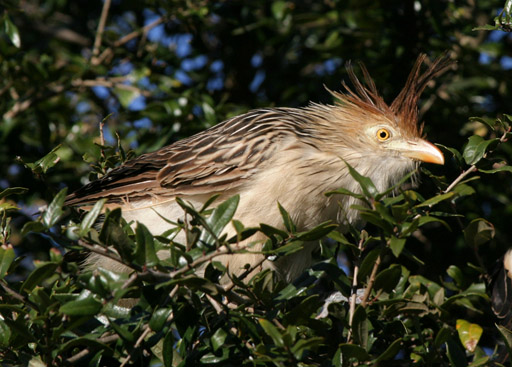
- Guira cuckoo, Guira guira

Scientific classification
- Kingdom: Animalia
- Phylum: Chordata
- Class: Aves
- Order: Cuculiformes
- Family: Cuculidae
- Subfamily: Crotophaginae; Swainson, 1837

Type species
- Crotophaga ani Linnaeus, 1758

Genera
- Guira; Crotophaga

= Crotophaginae =

Crotophagines Temporal range: Pleistocene - Holocene, 1.8–0 Ma

Subfamily of birds

The Crotophaginae are a small subfamily, within the cuckoo family Cuculidae, of four gregarious bird species occurring in the Americas. They were previously classified as a family Crotophagidae.

The subfamily is notable for the development of cooperative breeding where several females lay eggs in a communal nest. It contains the three anis and the guira cuckoo.

Among the anis, there is considerable variation in nesting habits. One species, The greater ani (Crotophaga major) lays 2 or 3 eggs, while the groove-billed ani (C. sulcirostris) lays seven. However the smooth-billed ani (C. ani) will share one nest between several females, with up to 29 eggs in one nest. Incubation takes 15 days for this species.

== Systematics ==
Four species make up the subfamily, namely the guira cuckoo (Guira guira) and the three members of the genus Crotophaga known as anis. Study of the cranial osteology and mitochondrial DNA yield the same phylogeny, namely that the Smooth-billed and groove-billed ani are each other's closest relatives, with the greater ani related and the guira cuckoo an earlier offshoot of the group.

Image	Genus	Living species
	Guira Lesson, 1830	Guira cuckoo, Guira guira
	Crotophaga Linnaeus, 1758	Greater ani, Crotophaga major; Smooth-billed ani, Crotophaga ani; Groove-billed ani, Crotophaga sulcirostris

== Distribution and habitat ==
The members of the family range from Florida in the north, through Central America and the West Indies and through South America south to Rio Negro in Argentina, in open habitats.
