= Egg tossing (behavior) =

Behavior observed in some species of birds

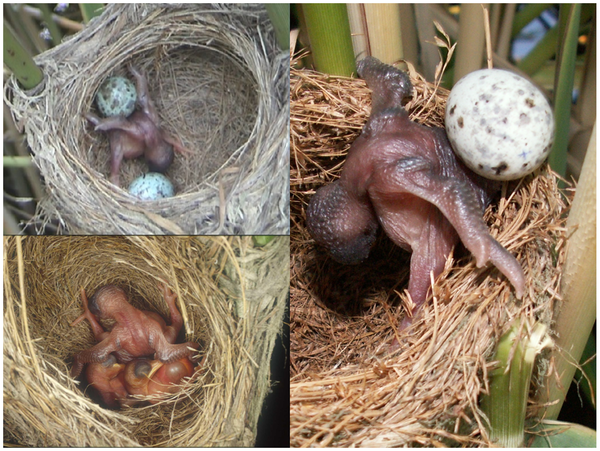
The common cuckoo brood parasite removing the reed warbler eggs from their own nest

Egg tossing or egg destruction is a behavior observed in some species of birds where one individual removes an egg from the communal nest. This is related to infanticide, where parents kill their own or other's offspring. Egg tossing is observed in avian species, most commonly females, who are involved with cooperative breeding or brood parasitism. Among colonial non-co-nesting birds, egg-tossing is observed to be performed by an individual of the same species, and, in the case of brood parasites, this behavior is done by either the same or different species. The behavior of egg tossing offers its advantages and disadvantages to both the actor and recipient.

== Behavior ==
Tossing of eggs is non-accidental; the individual rolls the egg to the edge of the nest by repeatedly flicking it with its beak. In brood-parasitic birds, such as the common cuckoo, the chick will push host eggs out using its back. During co-nesting, before a bird starts laying its own eggs, it will toss out eggs laid previously by other females. As a result, the last egg-layers may contribute more eggs to the common nest, and this will increase the chances that newly laid eggs bearing the genetic material of that female will have a better chance of survival. In some species, egg-tossing is a strategy of clutch coordination; eggs are tossed until all birds in the common nest are ready to proceed with brooding. This helps to prevent early egg-layers from dominating reproduction.

== Species ==
Some examples of communal breeders that demonstrate the egg tossing behavior are: ostriches, groove-billed anis, acorn woodpeckers, gray-breasted jays, guira cuckoos, smooth-billed anis, and common cuckoos.

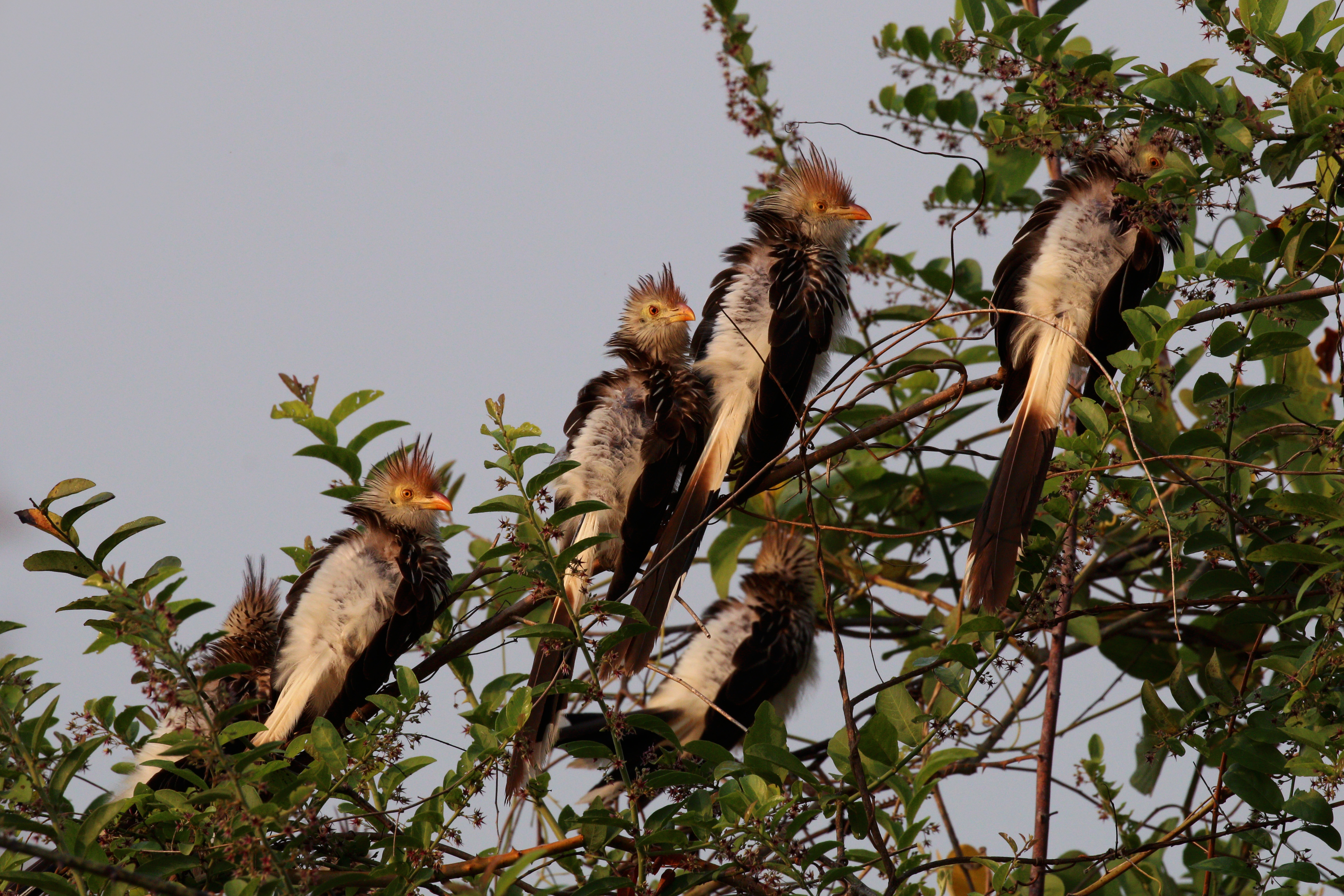
Guira cuckoos

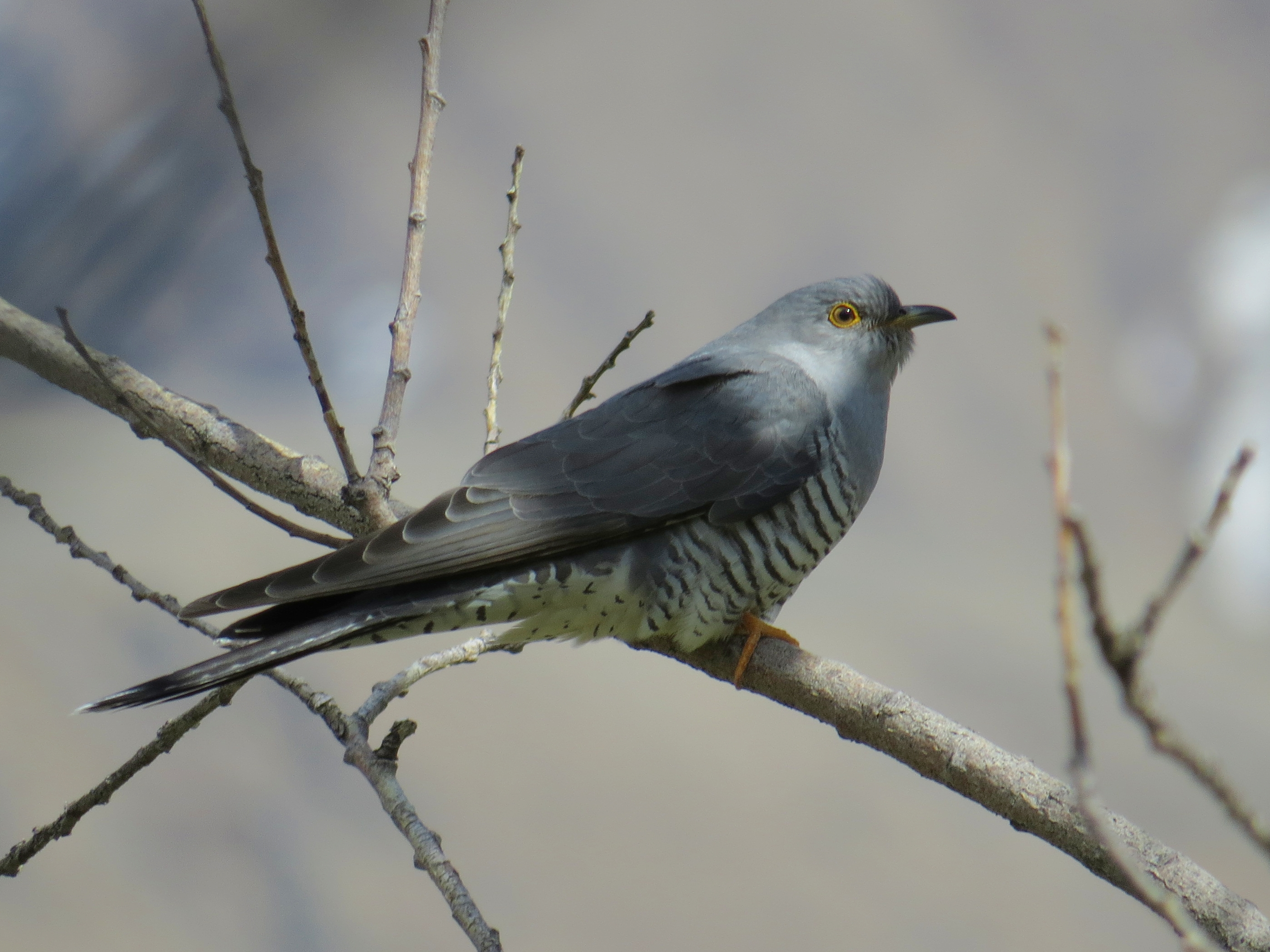
The common cuckoo

== Advantages and disadvantages ==
=== Advantages ===
Performing the egg tossing behavior increases the number of offspring per individual compared to those in single pairs. Many species have learned to adapt to this behavior to increase the chances of offspring survival.

The smooth-billed anis is one species that participates in communal breeding, where there are multiple females in a group. This has shown that the number of eggs produced per individual is greater in comparison to single-female groups. The reasoning is that this is due to the higher competition between females to have their own eggs be successfully hatched and from the large amount of egg loss. When there are more females in a group, the majority of egg loss is due to egg tossing.

The acorn woodpecker showed that when in a group of 7–8 individuals, the success rate of reproduction increased, but would decrease if more members joined the group. When there were two females in the clutch the success rate would decrease compared to a single-female clutch due to conflicts such as egg tossing.

In the guira cuckoo, up to 7 females share a nest and perform egg tossing behavior. Eggs that are laid in the early period of production are more likely to be tossed out of the nest by another female. When the group size increases, the behaviors that attempt to disrupt egg hatching or laying by others increase.

=== Disadvantage ===
Laying eggs late prevents the chicks from being tossed out of the nest, but it can have a negative impact on the offspring's survival. Late egg-laying causes later hatching, which increases the probability of death, since these late chicks will be smaller than their nestmates, putting them at risk.

== Adaptation ==
In the acorn woodpecker, it has been observed that the egg destruction behavior causes egg-laying to be synchronized between females. This synchronization of egg-laying allows for all females to have the same opportunity to have a similar number of eggs in the nest. The larger the communal breeding group, the longer it takes for this synchronization to occur.

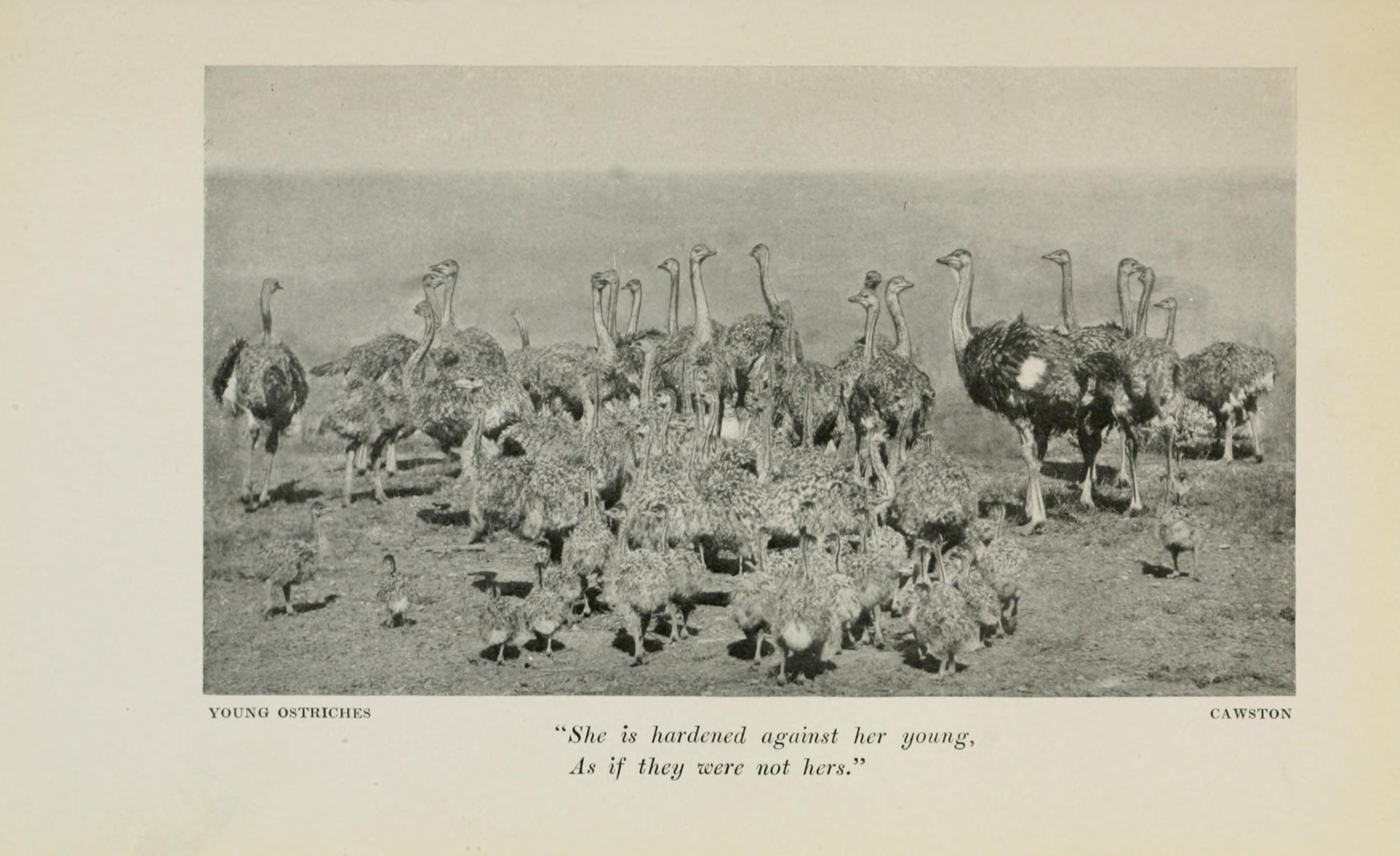
Drawing of ostriches with their young

Ostriches are usually found in a group of two to seven, and there is only one major hen, which will incubate the nest with the single male. The female ostriches will lay their eggs at the same time, leading to having too many eggs in the nest. The major hen is able to detect which eggs belong to her, and will push the other eggs to the perimeter of the nest, which is not looked after. This adaption of abandoning these eggs protects the well-kept eggs from predators.

In the grooved bill anis and in the guira cuckoo, these species will stop tossing eggs once they have started to produce eggs in the nest. This behavior prevents them from unknowingly tossing one of their own eggs out of the nest.

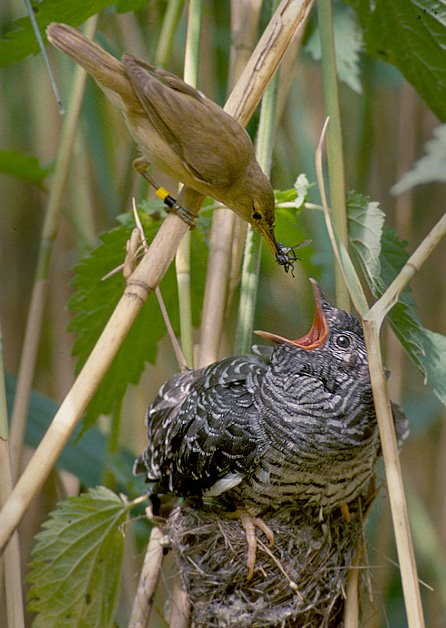
Reed warbler feeding common cuckoo brood parasite

== By brood parasites ==
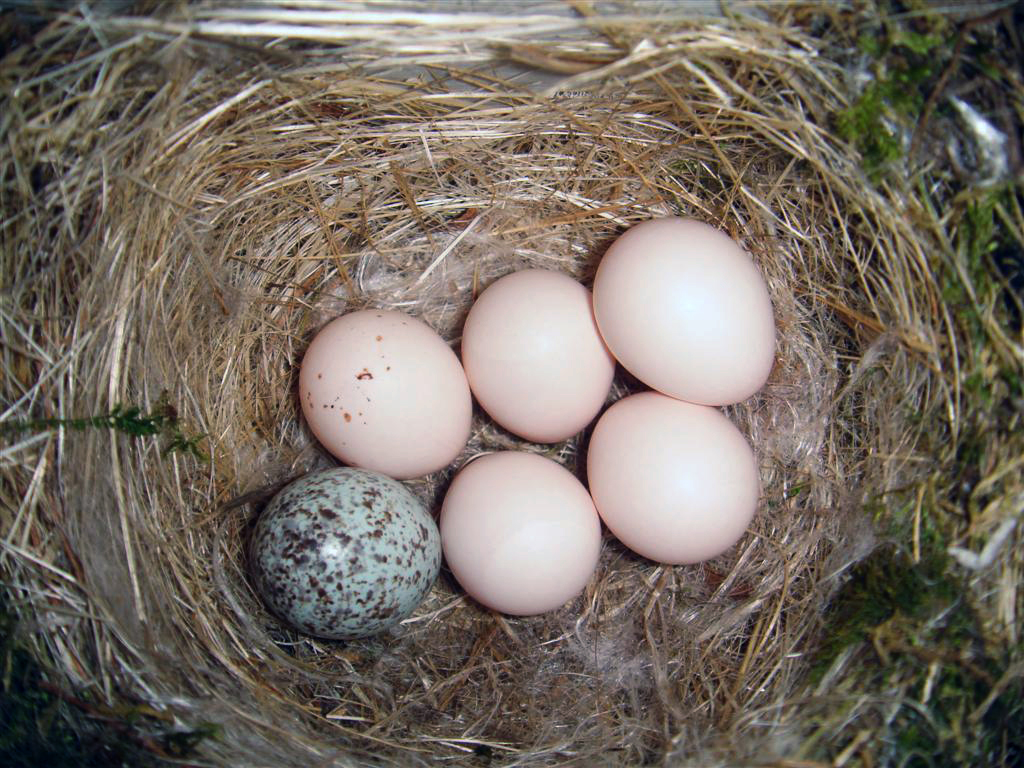
Brown headed cowbird egg in an eastern phoebe nest

There are several species that will increase their offspring's chance of survival through a means that is slightly different than egg tossing, which is brood parasitism. These species will lay their eggs in nests of different species, allowing the offspring to survive without their direct contributions. Some bird species that exhibit this behavior are the black-headed duck, the common cuckoo, and the cowbirds. There are two types of brood parasitism; one which the females lay their eggs in the nest of the same species, and one where the eggs are laid in the nest of a different species.

The common cuckoo is a species of cuckoo that exhibits brood parasitism in the nest of a different species. They accomplish this by watching the nest of a potential host, and, once the host leaves the nest, the female cuckoo will remove one of the host's eggs and will replace it with one of their own. The female cuckoo will have no part in taking care of her offspring; instead, she will leave the host's nest and look for another nest which she can lay more eggs. The common cuckoo will often stay in the nest and take advantage of feeding by the host mother, even after the cuckoo is much larger and evidently not the host's offspring.

A common species nest that the cuckoo will choose to place its eggs in is the reed warbler. The common cuckoo distinguishes the warbler's nest and will choose what specific nest to brood in depending on the foliage and distance from the nest.

The common cuckoo demonstrates the egg tossing behavior when they are just hatchlings. Once the cuckoo eggs are placed into the host nest and they hatch, they will push the other species' eggs out of the nest with their backs. This behavior is very beneficial for the cuckoo's survival, as they are able to grow and feed without any competition from other members of the nest.

The cowbird is another parasitic species that lays their eggs in a different species' nest; the eastern phoebe. Although the cowbird's eggs differ in size and colour, the eastern phoebe will still choose to provide parental care unless there is a partial clutch reduction, or PCR.

There are different methods that brood parasites use to trick the host into raising their child; however, some hosts have developed counter adaptations to these. The adaptation between the host and brood parasites is an example of co-evolution.

== Species ==
Brood parasitism is a rare behavior in which about 1% of all 10,000 birds in the world exhibit. The birds that display this behavior are 57 species of cuckoos, 5 species of cowbirds, 17 species of honeyguides, 20 species of African finches, and one duck called the black headed duck.
