= Ovicide =

Ovicide may refer to:

- Insecticides that are designed to kill eggs
- Infanticide (zoology), the destruction of eggs
