= Savaging =

In ethology, aggressive behaviour displayed by the mother towards the offspring

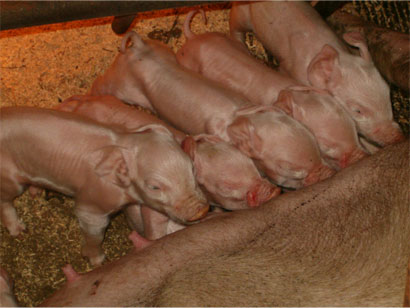
Proper care of piglets by a mother gilt or sow depends on sanitary conditions and a comfortable environment.

Savaging is a term used in the study of ethology that refers to aggressive behaviour displayed by the mother towards the offspring. Aggressive behaviour includes being rough with, injuring, biting, attacking, crushing and killing (maternal infanticide) of the offspring. While savaging behaviour has been seen in multiple species, it is predominantly demonstrated in domestic pigs (Sus scrofa domesticus). As the definition of savaging is so broad, research on the prevalence of savaging behaviour varies with reports of little savaging of offspring to savaging of offspring up to the 20th percentile. Prevalence of aggressive, non-fatal savaging is greater in gilts, or females who have not yet previously farrowed, as piglet-focused aggression is more frequent in young animals than sows, adult females who have previously given birth. Occurrence of savaging demonstrated by sows is greater if the sow has previously savaged her offspring either as a gilt or sow. Savaging behaviour usually occurs during the first two days after parturition. Prevalence of savaging is similar among first and second farrowing cycles. Savaging behaviour has a significant impact on both agricultural economy and animal welfare which is why it is currently a subject of interest in the pig industry.

== Environmental factors ==
There exist multiple environmental factors that increase the rate of savaging demonstrated by pigs. It has been shown that human attitudes and behaviour can affect the behaviour of domestic pigs. For example, annoyance and transmission of emotions can occur in gilts and sows when a new worker enters the farrowing rooms and makes excessive noise, does not feed the animals in a timely manner and/or is frustrated/annoyed. Research suggests that maternal behaviour may improve when workers and pigs are familiar with their environment and on a set schedule. Another environmental factor that has been examined is the amount of time spent by humans in the farrowing room. Decreased disturbance of the sows by human intrusions during farrowing has indicated a decrease in savaging behavior. Increased aggression in sows is not always directed towards piglets as sows were just as likely to attack inanimate objects (bricks) as they were to attack piglets. As indicated by the fact that aggressive behaviour can be predicted before parturition begins as indicated by pre-farrowing restlessness and the fact that aggression was directed towards both piglets and inanimate objects, sow aggression is not a result of a response to the sudden appearance of piglets. A study by Gonyou and Harris found that increasing light exposure in the farrowing rooms to 16–24 hours per day decreased piglet deaths due to savaging. In the same study, it was found that increased piglet vocalizations around the time of farrowing did not help gilts adjust to the sudden presence of piglets, and instead was shown to increase the amount of piglet-directed aggression. The influence of nest-building and nest-building materials has been shown to influence negative piglet-directed communication. Access to materials as well as higher quality materials such as straw decreased the amount of negative communication between sows and piglets. Similarly, limited space and poor pen conditions have been shown to increase the amount of piglet-directed aggression. Pigs are social animals and a female's social support network can play an important role in postpartum piglet-directed aggression. Free ranging pigs form sounders, or small social units, give young gilts the opportunity to observe gestation and parturition and exposing them to normal maternal behavior. Gilts raised in commercial pens are not exposed to piglets nor expecting mothers and thus are not aware of what to expect during gestation and parturition and are not aware of how to raise piglets. In support of this theory, there is strong evidence that parity influences the amount of savaging and piglet-directed aggression displayed among primiparous gilts versus muiltiparous sows. Some studies have found evidence of increased savaging rates in larger litter sizes as well.

== Genetic and biochemical factors ==
It has been proposed that the degree of aggressive behaviour displayed prior to farrowing cycles by sows and gilts predicts whether the offspring will be savaged and to what extent. Evidence has also been found that savaging sows may be genetically less likely to crush piglets, which lends to the existing research supporting that savaging sows can be competent mothers. Levels of steroid hormones such as estrogens and progestogens around farrowing correspond with levels of maternal aggression. Specifically, high levels of estradiol at postpartum and high levels of pre-farrowing estradiol to progesterone ratios in gilts show more savaging behaviour to piglets. An increase in maternal aggressive behaviour as a result of low levels of progesterone would not be implausible as progesterone has been known to modulate serotonergic receptors. High postpartum levels of estradiol and estriol have also been associated with maternal mood and behaviour. The paraventricular nucleus (PVN) and the amygdala play important roles in moderating anxiety and depression with the PVN being responsible for secreting corticotropin releasing hormone (CRH) and oxytocin. This would explain the increased amount of CRH in stressed gilts. Abnormal levels of prepartum and postpartum oxytocin have also been linked to increased aggression and savaging as both abnormally high and abnormally low levels has been reported in savaging mothers. Low levels of oxytocin result in fear and aggression as a result of the interaction between oxytocin and the opioid system and has also been linked to insufficient nursing. Low levels of prolactin result in decreased milk let-down, leading to insufficient nursing and limited oxytocin being produced as a result of nursing. Since oxytocin reduces functioning of the hypothalamic-pituitary-adrenal (HPA) axis, high levels of oxytocin corresponding to an increase in unnresponsiveness to piglet vocalizations would be the result of abnormal HPA pathway functioning. Heritability estimates of 0.11 and 0.25 from half-sib analyses have demonstrated that selection against sow savaging of pigs is possible; however, it may be slow to show effectiveness.

== Preventive measures ==
The pig industry is investing in research regarding savaging behaviours in hopes to diminish the losses they face when gilts and sows commit infanticide. Sedation techniques following birth have prevented savaging; however, in many cases, the onset of aggression is merely delayed. Light exposure has the potential to prevent or limit savaging in pigs as pigs exposed to light for 16–24 hours a day in farrowing room experienced a decrease in the prevalence of savaging. The industry has also attempted to avoid savaging behavior by limiting reproduction in gilts and sows that have previously savaged their offspring. Efforts to eliminate the behavior include additional care and attention to the mother pig during her farrowing cycles. Access to nesting materials such as straw and peat as well as sufficient pen space and conditions around the time of farrowing are also important factors in limiting savaging and piglet-directed aggression in pigs. Increased social interactions and support from sounders also reduces the rate of savaging and piglet-directed aggression, indicating that would be beneficial to raise pigs in a free-roaming environment, but further research is needed to indicate if this would be economically feasible. Restlessness and aggressive behaviour prior to farrowing have been shown to predict savaging and piglet-directed aggression following farrowing, allowing for the identification of individuals prone to savaging and subsequent treatment, precautionary measures, or supervision.

== Savaging in other species ==
Savaging of offspring by the biological mother has been reported in multiple species including farmed silver foxes, farmed wild boar and domestic breeds of farmed pigs. Though aggressive savaging behaviour is demonstrated by other species, it is most commonly used to describe pig aggression. Infanticide in rodents has also been observed, with Syrian hamsters engaging in both infanticide and then cannabalizing some of their offspring following parturition. Syrian hamsters are more likely to savage and successfully kill female offspring compared to male offspring and will cannibalize more offspring if metabolic fuels from food or fat stores are insufficient. This is unlike savaging in pigs, who don't cannabalize piglets and are not motivated to savage by hunger. Similar to pigs, litter size was shown to influence savaging with an increase in Syrian hamster litter size correlating to an increase in maternal infanticide. Research has shown that primiparous silver foxes demonstrate savaging shortly after birth with a 37% chance of killing the offspring through bite wounds. Silver foxes have been shown to engage in savaging behaviour followed by infanticide and cannibalism of the offspring. Savaging in wild boars has been found to have genetic significance as different genetic lines have produced varying degrees of savaging. Wild boars have shown aggression after parturition towards their offspring; however, they have lower infanticide rates than other species.

== See also ==
- List of abnormal behaviours in animals
- Infanticide (zoology)
- Pigs
- Ethology
- Zoology
- Aggression
- Cannibalism
