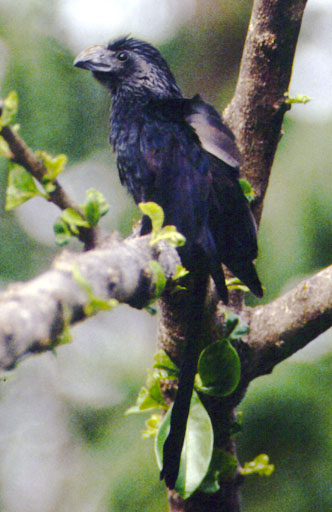
- Groove-billed ani, Crotophaga sulcirostris

Scientific classification
- Kingdom: Animalia
- Phylum: Chordata
- Class: Aves
- Order: Cuculiformes
- Family: Cuculidae
- Subfamily: Crotophaginae
- Genus: Crotophaga; Linnaeus, 1758

Type species
- Crotophaga ani (smooth-billed ani) Linnaeus, 1758

= Ani (bird) =

Ani Temporal range: Pleistocene - Holocene, 1.8–0 Ma

Genus of birds

The anis are the three species of birds in the genus Crotophaga of the cuckoo family. They are essentially tropical New World birds, although the range of two species just reaches the United States.

Unlike some cuckoos, the anis are not brood parasites, but nest communally, the cup nest being built by several pairs from 2–6 m high in a tree. A number of females lay their eggs in the nest and then share incubation and feeding.

The anis are large black birds with a long tail and a deep ridged black bill. Their flight is weak and wobbly, but they run well, and usually feed on the ground.

These are very gregarious species, always found in noisy groups. Anis feed on termites, large insects, and even lizards and frogs. The claim that they will remove ticks and other parasites from grazing animals has been disputed; while there is no doubt that anis follow grazing animals to catch disturbed insects and will occasionally eat fallen ticks, there is no proof that they remove ticks from the animals' bodies.

== Taxonomy ==
The genus Crotophaga was introduced in 1758 by the Swedish naturalist Carl Linnaeus in the tenth edition of his Systema Naturae to accommodate a single species, the smooth-billed ani (Crotophaga ani). The genus name combines the Ancient Greek krotōn meaning "tick" with -phagos meaning "-eating". Linnaeus cited the Irish physician Patrick Browne who in 1756 in his The Civil and Natural History of Jamaica had used the name Crotophaga and remarked that smooth-billed anis "live chiefly upon ticks and other small vermin; and may be frequently seen jumping about all cows and oxen in the fields". The name "Ani" was used in 1648 by German naturalist Georg Marcgrave in his Historia Naturalis Brasiliae. Marcgrave did not explain the origin of the word, but it is probably derived from the Tupi language.

=== Species ===
The genus contains three species.

Genus Crotophaga – Linnaeus, 1758 – three species
Common name	Scientific name and subspecies	Range	Size and ecology	IUCN status and estimated population
Greater ani	Crotophaga major (Gmelin, 1788)	Panama and Trinidad through tropical South America to northern Argentina	Size: Habitat: Diet:	LC
Smooth-billed ani	Crotophaga ani Linnaeus, 1758	Florida, the Bahamas, the Caribbean, parts of Central America, south to western Ecuador, Brazil, and northern Argentina	Size: Habitat: Diet:	LC
Groove-billed ani	Crotophaga sulcirostris Swainson, 1827	southern Texas, central Mexico, the Bahamas, through Central America, to northern Colombia and Venezuela and coastal Ecuador, and Peru	Size: Habitat: Diet:	LC
