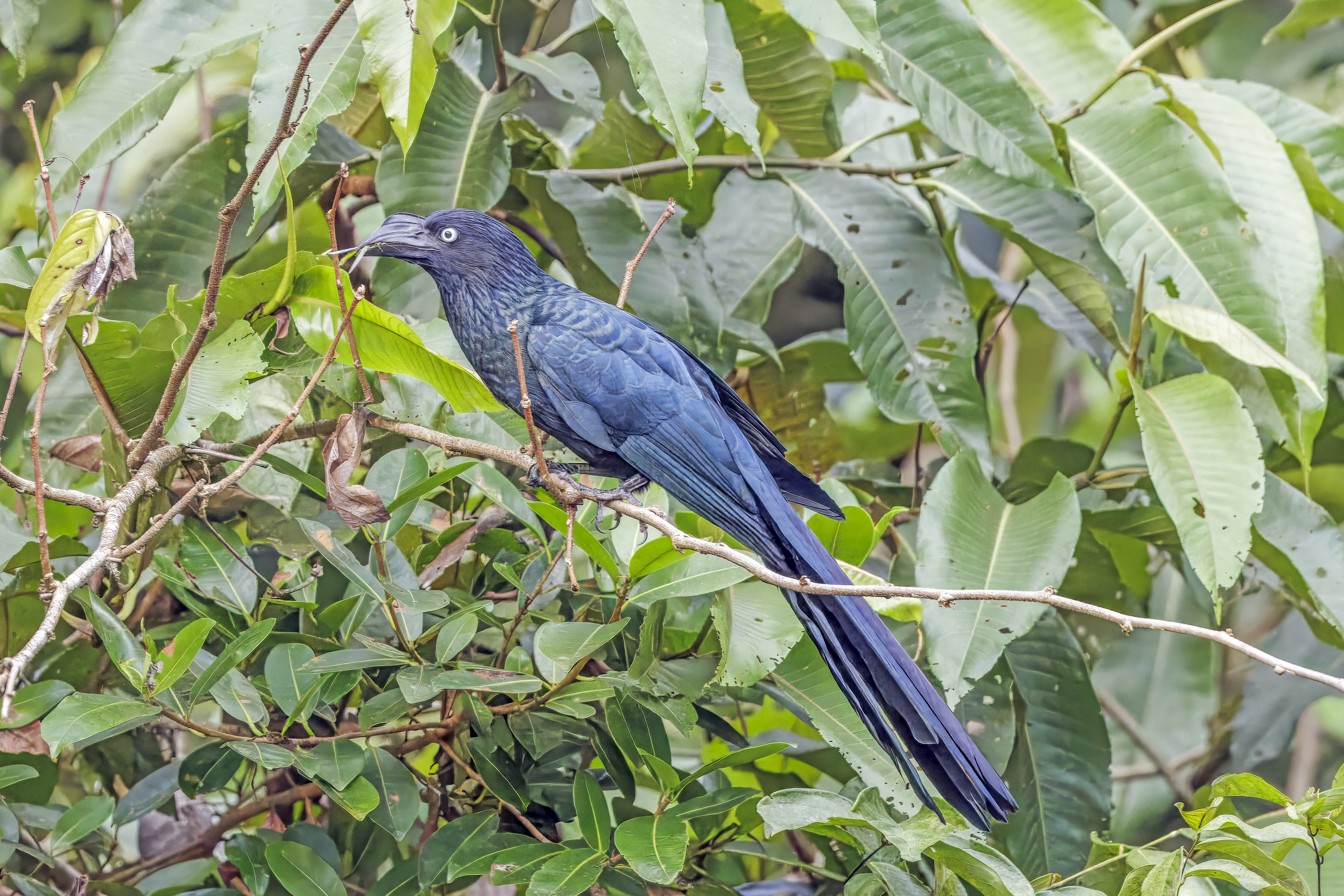

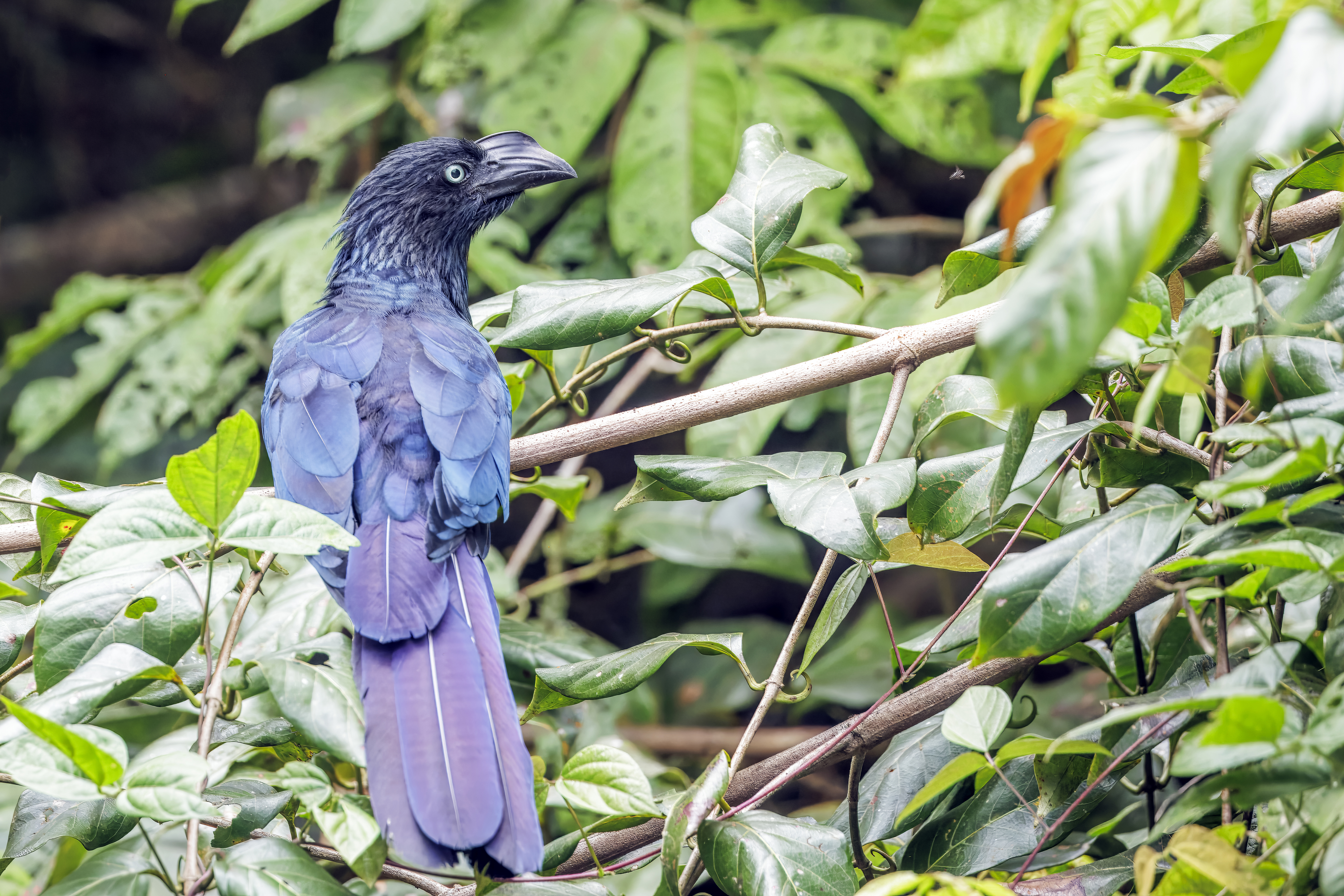
- both in Ecuador

Conservation status
- Least Concern (IUCN 3.1)

Scientific classification
- Kingdom: Animalia
- Phylum: Chordata
- Class: Aves
- Order: Cuculiformes
- Family: Cuculidae
- Genus: Crotophaga
- Species: C. major

Binomial name
- Crotophaga major Gmelin, 1788

= Greater ani =

Species of bird

The greater ani (Crotophaga major) is a bird in the cuckoo family. It is sometimes referred to as the black cuckoo. It is found through tropical South America south to northern Argentina.

== Taxonomy ==
In 1760 the French zoologist Mathurin Jacques Brisson included a description and an illustration of the greater ani in his Ornithologie based on a specimen collected in Cayenne, French Guiana. He used the French name Le grand Bout-de-Petun and the Latin name Crotophagus Major. Although Brisson coined Latin names, these do not conform to the binomial system and are not recognised by the International Commission on Zoological Nomenclature. The greater ani was also described and illustrated in 1779 by the French polymath Georges-Louis Leclerc, Comte de Buffon in his Histoire Naturelle des Oiseaux.

When in 1788 the German naturalist Johann Friedrich Gmelin revised and expanded Carl Linnaeus's Systema Naturae, he included the greater ani. He placed it with the smooth-billed ani in the genus Crotophaga, coined the binomial name Crotophaga major and cited the earlier authors. Gmelin specified the type locality as Cayenne. The genus name combines the Ancient Greek krotōn meaning "tick" with -phagos meaning "-eating". The species is monotypic: no subspecies are recognised.

== Description ==
The greater ani is about 46 cm (18 in) in length. Males weigh around 162 g (5.7 oz), females 145 g (5.1 oz). The adult is mainly blue-glossed black, with a long tail, massive ridged black bill, and a white iris. Immature birds have a brown iris.

The calls include croaking and turkey-like gobbling kro-koro.

== Distribution and habitat ==
This ani is a breeding species from Panama and Trinidad through tropical South America to northern Argentina. It is found in mangrove swamps, semi-open woodland near water, and the edges of forests. It is a seasonal migrant in at least some parts of its range.

== Behaviour ==
This is a very gregarious species, always found in noisy groups.

=== Feeding ===
The greater ani feeds on large insects (such as beetles, grasshoppers and caterpillars) and even spiders, lizards, frogs, fruits, berries and Euphorbia seeds.

=== Breeding ===
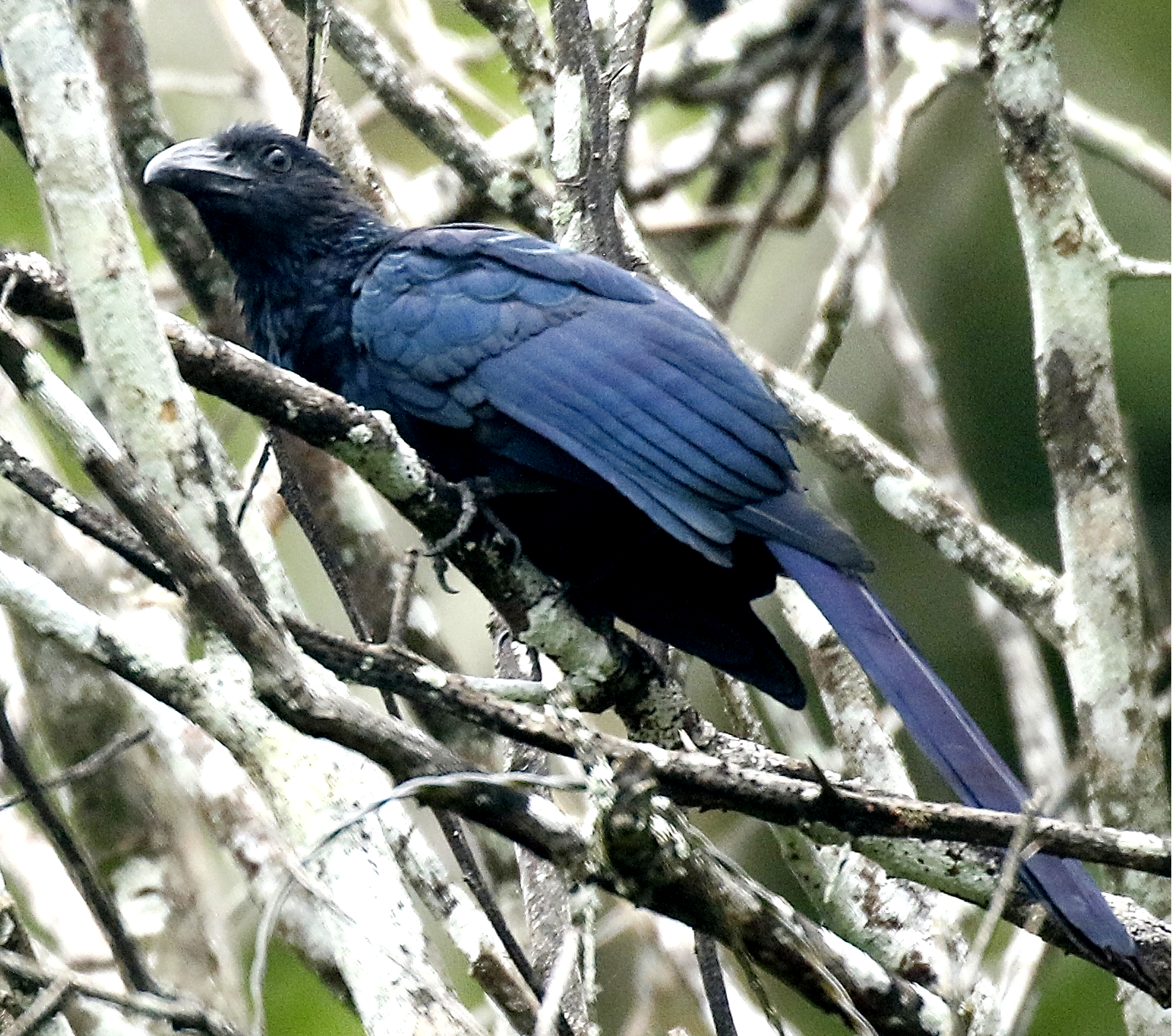
Juvenile has black eyes, Darien Panama

The nest, built and lived in communally by two to five pairs, is a deep cup lined with leaves and placed usually 2–5 m (6.6–16.4 ft) high in a tree. A number of females lay their chalky deep blue eggs in the nest and then share incubation and feeding. These breeding groups may also include non-breeding helpers. Nests have been found containing 3–10 eggs, with an incubation time of 11–12 days, with nestlings free to leave the nest after five days. They will be fed for several weeks if they choose not to leave.

In a longterm study, it was found that around 15% of females lay their eggs in the nest of another nesting group. This conspecific brood parasitism happens primarily when a female has lost her own clutch to predation. In regards to the nesting group, the first couple eggs will be rejected by other nest members when the mother of those specific egg leaves to forage. Egg rejection happens more often with larger groups, and one theory claims there is a balance within having more ani's to defend the nest from predation, and less ani's to minimize intraspecific competition. This leads to an average of two to three breeding pairs in one nest, with any greater amount being rare.

In their book Animals and the Right to Politics, political philosophers Sue Donaldson and Will Kymlicka refer to the tendency of groups of parents to huddle together as an example of communication oriented towards collective decision-making, particularly regarding division of labor.
