= Infanticide in carnivores =

Infanticide is the killing of a neonate after birth. In zoology, this commonly refers to the killing and in some cases consumption of newborn animals by either a parent or an unrelated adult of the species. In carnivores, it is common for an unrelated male to commit infanticide to make females sexually receptive. Parental infanticide is sometimes a result of extreme stress by human intrusion.

== Parental infanticide ==
The giant otter becomes extremely sensitive to human activity when rearing its young. Giant otters in captivity must be given privacy when raising their litters as cases of parental infanticide have been reported in the species, potentially caused by human visual and acoustic interference. Though not confirmed, it has been suspected that similar occurrences happen in the wild due to tourists. In the wild, polar bear mothers will sometimes kill their young because they lack adequate food, but in captivity the main reason is stress.

== Nonparental infanticide ==
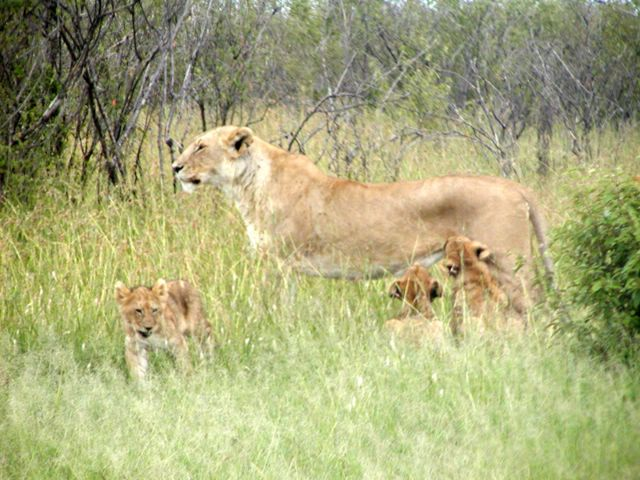
Lion cubs are frequent victims of nonparental infanticide by usurping males.

In many instances of nonparental infanticide in carnivores, the male of a species kills the young of a female to make her sexually receptive, e.g. brown bears. When one or two new male lions defeat and exile the previous males of a pride, the conqueror(s) will often kill any existing young cubs fathered by the losers. As many as 80% of lion cubs die before they reach the age of two. Often a lioness tries to defend her cubs against this kind of behavior from the usurping male(s), but success is more common when a group of females join to defend their offspring. Within five months of a tigress giving birth, she may become receptive again if her first litter is lost, and for this reason wandering males may commit infanticide. In fear of infanticide, female jaguars will not tolerate the presence of any male, even the father of the litter, once she gives birth to her cubs.

If the father of a leopard's litter is present for the rearing of the cubs, there are fewer instances of infanticide as foreign males stay farther away from the cubs.

Groups of banded mongooses have been observed kidnapping and/or killing the members of other groups for no confirmed reason, though many theories have been suggested.

== Species known to commit infanticide ==
- African wild dog
- Bald eagle
- Banded mongoose
- Bottlenose dolphin
- Brown bear
- Brown hyena
- Dwarf mongoose
- Domestic cat
- Eurasian otter
- Giant otter
- Gray wolf
- Golden jackal
- Jaguar
- Leopard
- Lion
- Meerkat
- Polar bear
- Spotted hyena
- Tiger

== Exceptions ==
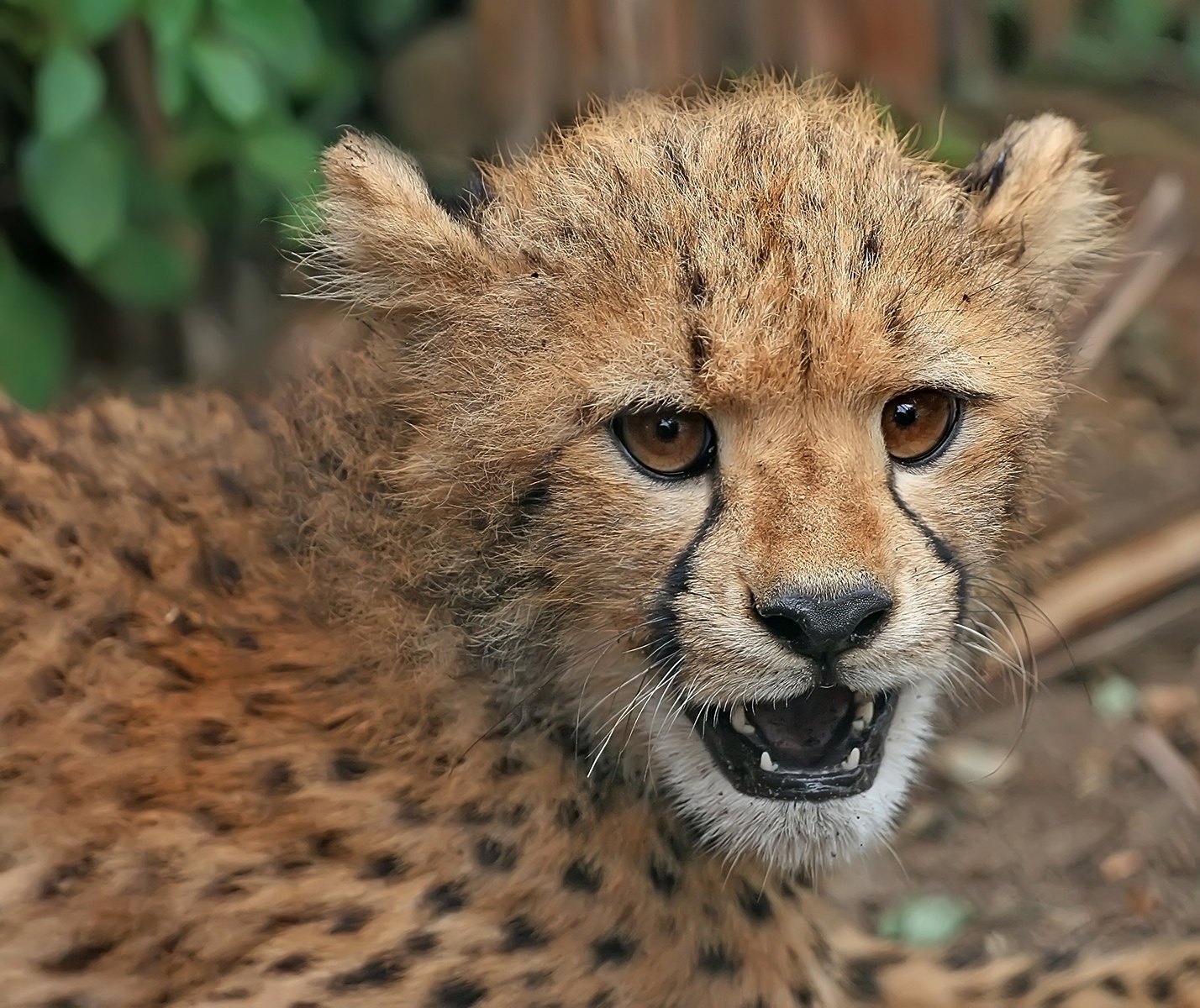
Due to the reproductive behavior of female cheetahs, males are unlikely to commit infanticide.

Unlike other African felids, no infanticidal behavior has been observed in the cheetah. Scientists hypothesize that this is because many cheetah litters have cubs from different fathers and males would not want to kill any cubs in case they killed their own. The promiscuity of female cheetahs helps to protect the threatened species not only by preventing infanticide but also by bringing greater genetic diversity. This genetic diversity averts inbreeding from occurring and widens the genetic pool of the species. Nevertheless, cheetah cubs have a remarkably high mortality rate.
