= Infanticide (zoology) =

Killing of young offspring by an adult animal of the same species

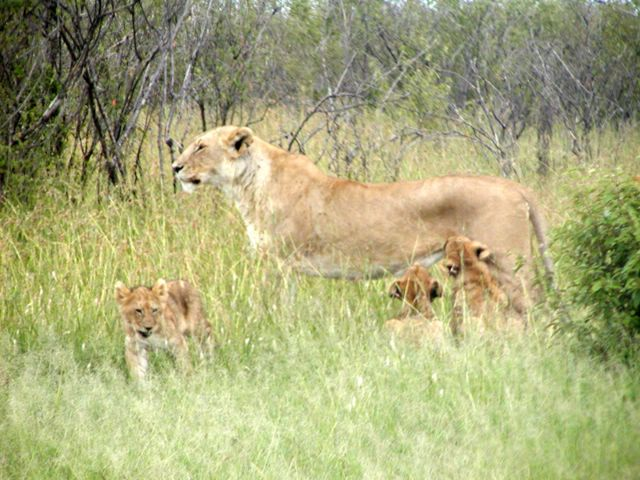
Lion cubs may be killed by males replacing other males in the pride.

In animals, infanticide involves the intentional killing of young offspring by a mature animal of the same species. Animal infanticide is studied in zoology, specifically in the field of ethology. Ovicide is the analogous destruction of eggs. The practice has been observed in many species throughout the animal kingdom, especially primates (primate infanticide) but including microscopic rotifers, insects, fish, amphibians, birds and mammals. Infanticide can be practiced by both males and females.

Infanticide caused by sexual conflict has the general theme of the killer (often male) becoming the new sexual partner of the victim's parent, which would otherwise be unavailable. This represents a gain in fitness by the killer, and a loss in fitness by the parents of the offspring killed. This is a type of evolutionary struggle between the two sexes, in which the victim sex may have counter-adaptations that reduce the success of this practice. It may also occur for other reasons, such as the struggle for food between females. In this case individuals may even kill closely related offspring.

Filial infanticide occurs when a parent kills its own offspring. This sometimes involves consumption of the young themselves, which is termed filial cannibalism. The behavior is widespread in fishes, and is seen in terrestrial animals as well. Human infanticide has been recorded in almost every culture. A unique aspect of human infanticide is sex-selective infanticide.

== Background ==
Infanticide only came to be seen as a significant occurrence in nature quite recently. At the time it was first seriously treated by Yukimaru Sugiyama, infanticide was attributed to stress-causing factors like overcrowding and captivity, and was considered pathological and maladaptive. Classical ethology held that conspecifics (members of the same species) rarely killed each other. By the 1980s it had gained much greater acceptance. Possible reasons it was not treated as a prevalent natural phenomenon include its abhorrence to people, the popular group and species selectionist notions of the time (the idea that individuals behave for the good of the group or species; compare with gene-centered view of evolution), and the fact that it is very difficult to observe in the field.

== Infanticide involving sexual conflict ==
This form of infanticide represents a struggle between the sexes, where one sex exploits the other, much to the latter's disadvantage. It is usually the male who benefits from this behavior, though in cases where males play similar roles to females in parental care the victim and perpetrator may be reversed (see Bateman's principle for discussion of this asymmetry).

=== By males ===
Hanuman langurs (or gray langurs) are Old World monkeys found in India. They are a social animal, living in groups that consist of a single dominant male and multiple females. The dominant male has a reproductive monopoly within the group, which causes subordinate males to have a much lower fitness value in comparison. To gain the opportunity to reproduce, sub-ordinate males try to take over the dominant role within a group, usually resulting in an aggressive struggle with the existing dominant male. If successful in overthrowing the previous male, unrelated infants of the females are then killed. This infanticidal period is limited to the window just after the group is taken over. Cannibalism, however, has not been observed in this species.

Infanticide not only reduces intraspecific competition between the incumbent's offspring and those of other males but also increases the parental investment afforded to their own young, and allows females to become fertile faster. This is because females of this species, as well as many other mammals, do not ovulate during lactation. It then becomes easier to understand how infanticide evolved. If a male kills a female's young, she stops lactating and is able to become pregnant again. Because of this, the newly dominant male is able to reproduce at a faster rate than without the act of infanticide. As males are in a constant struggle to protect their group, those that express infanticidal behavior will contribute a larger portion to future gene pools (see natural selection).

Similar behavior is also seen in male lions, among other species, who also kill young cubs, thereby enabling them to impregnate the females. Unlike langurs, male lions live in small groups, which cooperate to take control of a pride from an existing group. They will attempt to kill any cubs that are roughly nine months old or younger, though as in other species, the female will attempt to defend her cubs viciously. Males have, on average, only a two-year window in which to pass on their genes, and lionesses only give birth once every two years, so the selective pressure on them to conform to this behavior is strong. In fact it is estimated that a quarter of cubs dying in the first year of life are victims of infanticide.

Male mice show great variation in behavior over time. After fertilizing a female, they become aggressive towards mouse pups for three weeks, killing any they come across. After this period however, their behavior changes dramatically, and they become paternal, caring for their own offspring. This lasts for almost two months, but afterwards they become infanticidal once more. It is no coincidence here that the female gestation period is three weeks as well, or that it takes roughly two months for pups to become fully weaned and leave their nest. The proximate mechanism that allows for the correct timing of these periods involves circadian rhythms (see chronobiology), each day and night cycle affecting the mouse's internal neural physiology, and disturbances in the duration of these cycles results in different periods of time between behaviors. The adaptive value of this behavior switching is twofold; infanticide removes competitors for when the mouse does have offspring, and allows the female victims to be impregnated earlier than if they continued to care for their young, as mentioned above.

Gerbils, on the other hand, no longer commit infanticide once they have paired with a female, but actively kill and eat other offspring when young. The females of this species behave much like male mice, hunting down other litters except when rearing their own.

==== Prospective infanticide ====
Prospective infanticide is a subset of sexual competition infanticide in which young born after the arrival of the new male are killed. This is less common than infanticide of existing young, but can still increase fitness in cases where the offspring could not possibly have been fathered by the new mate, i.e. one gestation or fertility period. This is known to occur in lions and langurs, and has also been observed in other species such as house wrens. In birds, however, the situation is more complex, as female eggs are fertilized one at a time, with a 24-hour delay between each. Males may destroy clutches laid 12 days or more after their arrival, though their investment of around 60 days of parental care is large, so a high level of parental certainty is needed.

=== By females ===
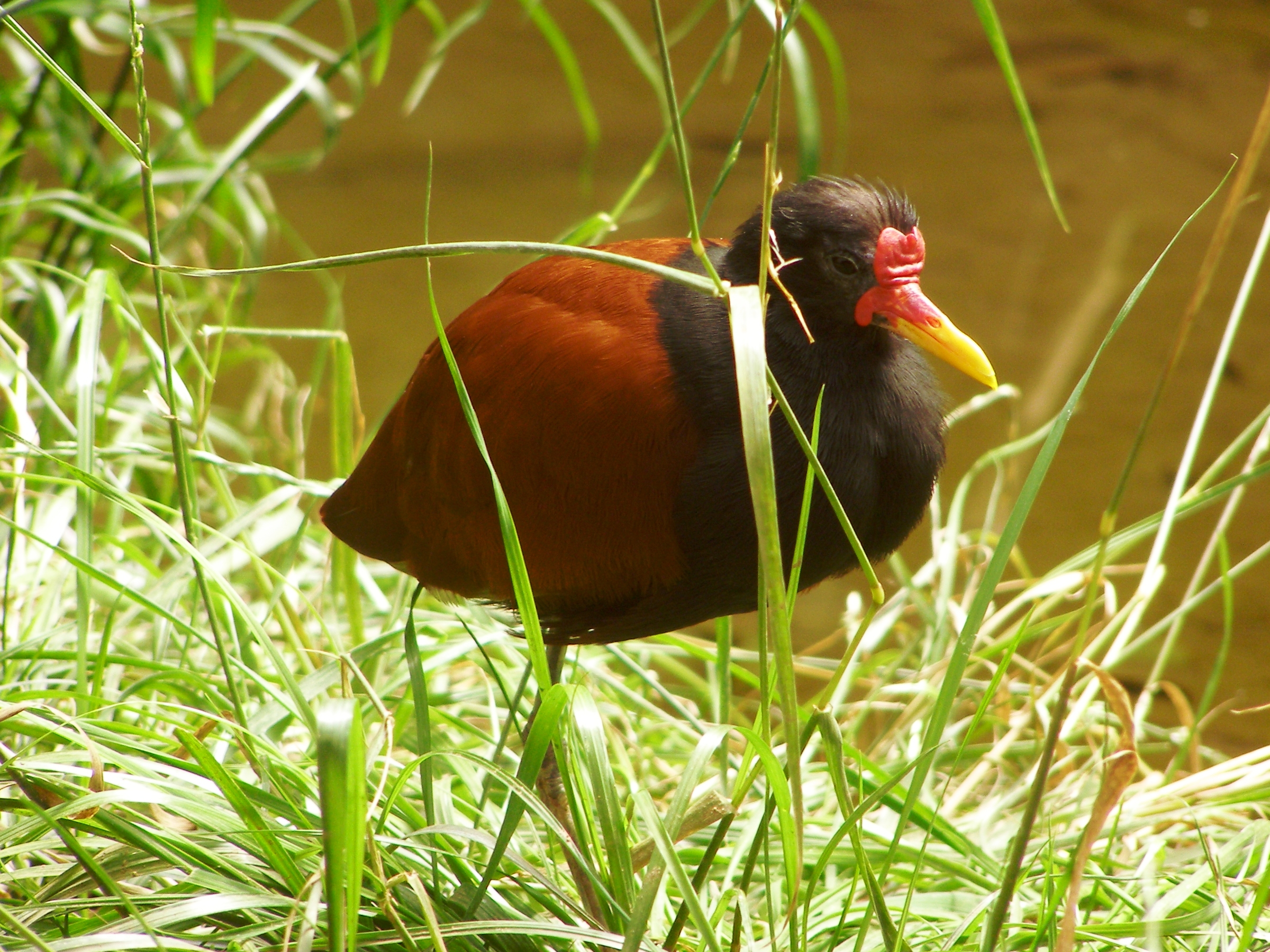
Jacana jacana females carry out infanticide.

Females are also known to display infanticidal behavior. This may appear unexpected, as the conditions described above do not apply. Males are not always an unlimited resource though—in some species, males provide parental care to their offspring, and females may compete indirectly with others by killing their offspring, freeing up the limiting resource that the males represent. This has been documented in research by Stephen Emlen and Natalie Demong on wattled jacanas (Jacana jacana), a tropical wading bird. In the wattled jacana, it is exclusively the male sex that broods, while females defend their territory. In this experiment Demong and Emlen found that removing females from a territory resulted in nearby females attacking the chicks of the male in most cases, evicting them from their nest. The males then fertilized the offending females and cared for their young. Emlen describes how he "shot a female one night, and ... by first light a new female was already on the turf. I saw terrible things—pecking and picking up and throwing down chicks until they were dead. Within hours she was soliciting the male, and he was mounting her the same day. The next night I shot the other female, then came out the next morning and saw the whole thing again."

Infanticide is also seen in giant water bugs. Lethocerus deyrollei is a large and nocturnal predatory insect found in still waters near vegetation. In this species the males take care of masses of eggs by keeping them hydrated with water from their bodies. Without a male caring for the eggs like this, they become desiccated and will not hatch. In this species, males are a scarce resource that females must sometimes compete for. Those that cannot find a free male often stab the eggs of a brooding one. As in the above case, males then fertilize this female and care for her eggs. Noritaka Ichikawa has found that males only moisten their eggs during the first 90 seconds or so, after which all of the moisture on their bodies has evaporated. However, they guard the egg masses for as long as several hours at a time, when they could be hunting prey. They do not seem to prevent further evaporation by staying guard, as males that only guarded the nest for short periods were seen to have similar hatching rates in a controlled experiment where there were no females present. It seems rather that males are more successful in avoiding infanticidal females when they are out of the water with their eggs, which might well explain the ultimate cause of this behavior.

A female rat will eat the kits of strange females for a source of nutrition, and to take over the nest for her own litter.

== Resource competition ==
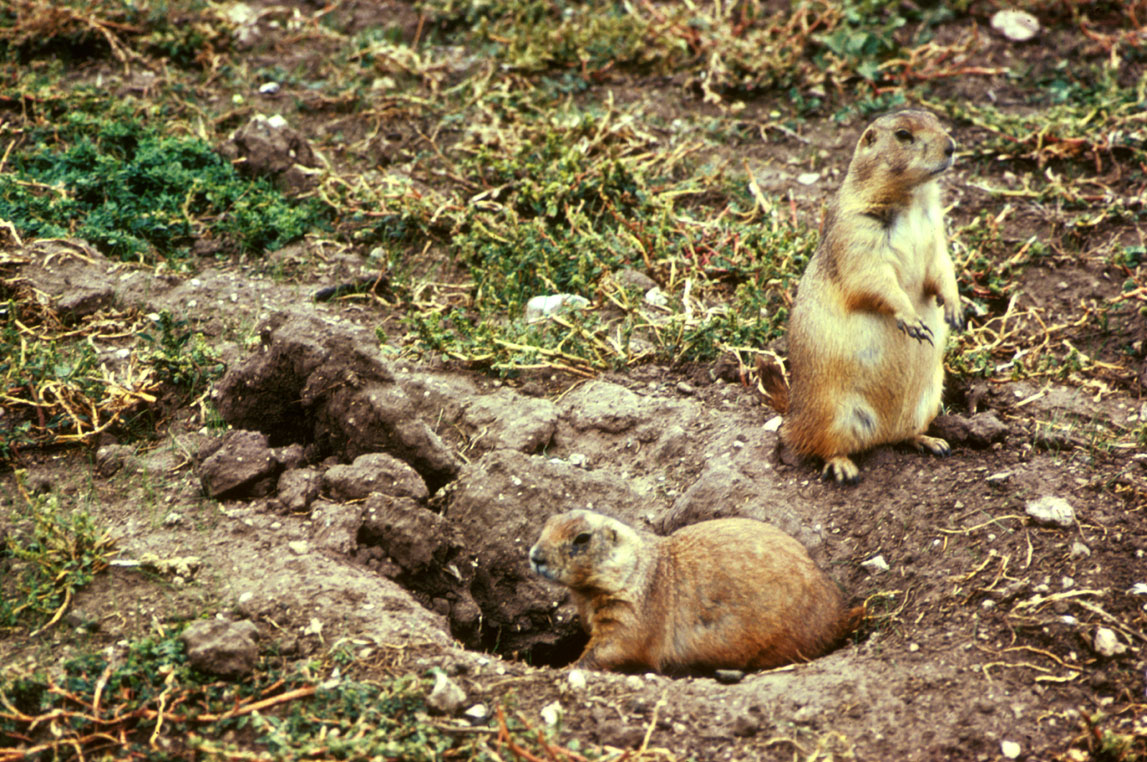
The Black-tailed prairie dog (Cynomys ludovicianus)

Black-tailed prairie dogs are colonially-living, harem-polygynous squirrels found mainly in the United States. Their living arrangement involves one male living with four or so females in a territory defended by all individuals, and underground nesting. Black-tails only have one litter per year, and are in estrous for only a single day around the beginning of spring.

A seven-year natural experiment by John Hoogland and others from Princeton University revealed that infanticide is widespread in this species, including infanticide from invading males and immigrant females, as well as occasional cannibalism of an individual's own offspring. The surprising finding of the study was that by far the most common type of infanticide involved the killing of close kin's offspring. This seems illogical, as kin selection favors behaviors that promote the well-being of closely related individuals. It was postulated that this form of infanticide is more successful than trying to kill young in nearby groups, as the whole group must be bypassed in this case, while within a group only the mother need be evaded. Marauding behavior is evidently adaptive, as infanticidal females had more and healthier young than others, and were heavier themselves as well. This behavior appears to reduce competition with other females for food, and future competition among offspring.

Similar behavior has been reported in the meerkat (Suricata suricatta), including cases of females killing their mother's, sister's, and daughter's offspring. Infanticidal raids from neighboring groups also occurred.

== Other ==
Bottlenose dolphins have been reported to kill their young through impact injuries. Dominant male langurs tend to kill the existing young upon taking control of a harem. There have been sightings of infanticide in the leopard population. The males of the Stegodyphus lineatus species of spider have been known to exhibit infanticide as a way to encourage females to mate again. There is at least one documented case of infanticide among Asian elephants at Dong Yai Wildlife Sanctuary, with the researchers describing it as likely normal behavior among aggressive musth elephants.

In mammals, male infanticide is most often observed in non-seasonal breeders. There is less fitness advantage for a conspecific to carry out infanticide if the interbirth period of the mother will not be decreased and the female will not return to estrous. In Felidae, birthing periods can happen anytime during the year, as long as there is not an unweaned offspring of that female. This is a contributor to the frequency of infanticide in carnivorous felids. Some species of seasonal breeders have been observed to commit infanticide. Cases in the snub-nosed monkey, a seasonal breeding primate, have shown that infanticide does lessen the interbirth period of the females and can allow them to breed with the next breeding group. Other cases of seasonal breeding species where the infanticidal characteristic is observed have been explained as a way of preserving the mother's resources and energy in turn increasing the reproductive success of upcoming breeding periods.

== Costs and defenses ==
=== Costs of the behavior ===
While it may be beneficial for some species to behave this way, infanticide has risks for the perpetrator. Having already expended energy and perhaps sustained serious wounds in a fight with another male, attacks from females who vigorously defend their offspring may be telling for harem-polygynous males, with a risk of infection. It is also energetically costly to pursue a mother's young, which may try to escape.

Costs of the behavior described in prairie dogs include the risk to an individual of losing their own young while killing another's, not to mention the fact that they are killing their own relatives. In a species where infanticide is common, perpetrators may well be victims themselves in the future, such that they come out no better off; but as long as an infanticidal individual gains in reproductive output by its behavior, it will tend to become common. Further costs of the behavior in general may be induced by counter-strategies evolved in the other sex, as described below.

=== As a cost of social behavior ===
Taking a broader view of the black-tailed prairie dog situation, infanticide can be seen as a cost of social living. If each female were to have her own private nest away from others, she would be much less likely to have her infants killed when absent. This, and other costs such as increased spread of parasites, must be made up for by other benefits, such as group territory defense and increased awareness of predators.

An avian example published in Nature is acorn woodpeckers. Females nest together, possibly because those nesting alone have their eggs constantly destroyed by rivals. Even so, eggs are consistently removed at first by nest partners themselves, until the entire group lays on the same day. They then cooperate and incubate the eggs as a group, but by this time a significant proportion of their eggs have been lost because of this ovicidal behavior.

=== Counter-strategies ===
Because this form of infanticide reduces the fitness of killed individuals' parents, animals have evolved a range of counter-strategies against this behavior. These may be divided into two very different classes - those that tend to prevent infanticide, and those that minimize losses.

==== Loss minimization ====
Some females abort or resorb their own young while they are still in development after a new male takes over; this is known as the Bruce effect. This may prevent their young from being killed after birth, saving the mother wasted time and energy. However, this strategy also benefits the new male. In mice this can occur by the proximate mechanism of the female smelling the odor of the new male's urine.

==== Preventive adaptations ====
Infanticide in burying beetles may have led to male parental care. In this species males often cooperate with the female in preparing a piece of carrion, which is buried with the eggs and eaten by the larvae when they hatch. Males may also guard the site alongside the female. It is apparent from experiments that this behavior does not provide their young with any better nourishment, nor is it of any use in defending against predators. However, other burying bugs may try to take their nesting space. When this occurs, a male-female pair is over twice as successful in nest defense, preventing the ovicide of their offspring.

Female langurs may leave the group with their young alongside the outgoing male, and others may develop a false estrous and allow the male to copulate, deceiving him into thinking she is actually sexually receptive. Females may also have sexual liaisons with other males. This promiscuous behavior is adaptive, because males will not know whether it is their own offspring they are killing or not, and may be more reluctant or invest less effort in infanticide attempts. Lionesses cooperatively guard against scouting males, and a pair were seen to violently attack a male after it killed one of their young. Resistance to infanticide is also costly, though: for instance, a female may sustain serious injuries in defending her young. At times it is simply more advantageous to submit than to fight.

Infanticide, the destruction of offspring characteristic to many species, has posed so great a threat that there have been observable changes of behavior in respective female mothers; more specifically, these changes exist as preventive measures. A common behavioral mechanism by females to reduce the risk of infanticide of future offspring is through the process of paternity confusion or dilution. In theory, this implies that a female that mates with multiple males will widely spread the assumption of paternity across many males, and therefore make them less likely to kill or attack offspring that could potentially carry their genes. This theory operates under the assumption that the specific males keep a memory of past mates, under a desire to perpetuate their own genes In the Japanese macaque (macaca fuscata), female mating with multiple males, or dilution of paternity, was found to inhibit male-to-infant aggression and infanticide eight times less towards infants of females with which they had previously mated. Multi-male mating, or MMM, is recorded as a measure to prevent infanticide in species where young is altricial, or heavily dependent, and where there is a high turnover rate for dominant males, which leads to infanticide of the previous dominant male's young. Examples include, but are not limited to; white-footed mice, hamsters, lions, langurs, baboons, and macaques. Along with mating with multiple males, the mating of females throughout the entirety of a reproductive cycle also serves a purpose for inhibiting the chance of infanticide. This theory assumes that males use information on past matings to make decisions on committing infanticide, and that females subsequently manipulate that knowledge. Females which are able to appear sexually active or receptive at all stages of their cycle, even during pregnancy with another male's offspring, can confuse the males into believing that the subsequent children are theirs. This "pseudo-estrus" theory applies to females within species that do not exhibit obvious clues to each stage of their cycle, such as langurs, rhesus macaques, and gelada baboons. An alternative to paternity confusion as a method of infanticide prevention is paternity concentration. This is the behavior of females to concentrate paternity to one specific dominant male as a means of protection from infanticide at the hands of less-dominant males. This particularly applies to species in which a male has a very long tenure as the dominant male, and faces little instability in this hierarchy. Females choose these dominant males as the best available form of protection, and therefore mate exclusively with this male. This is especially common within small rodents. An additional behavioral strategy to prevent infanticide by males may be aggressive protection of the nest along with female presence. This strategy is commonly used in species such as European rabbits. Aggressive protection of the nest in an effort to reduce infanticide is observed with the Black Rock Skink. Egernia saxatilis live in small families and adults defend their territories against conspecifics. The small "nuclear families" live in the same permanent shelter and the parents protect their infants from infanticidal conspecifics in this way. Adults attack unrelated juveniles but not their own offspring. The presence of a parent significantly reduces the rate of infanticide because conspecific adults ignore juveniles when a parent is present, likely because another adult is more threatening to the aggressive lizard. Therefore, a juvenile living within its parents' own territory will experience far less attacks from conspecific adults.

== Infanticide by parents and caregivers ==
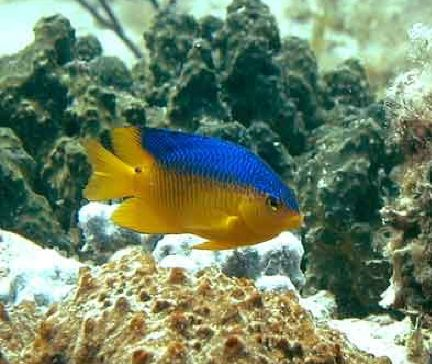
Damselfish may eat their own offspring.

Filial infanticide occurs when a parent kills its own offspring. Both male and female parents have been observed to do this, as well as sterile worker castes in some eusocial animals. Filial infanticide is also observed as a form of brood reduction in some birds species, such as the white stork. This may be due to a lack of siblicide in this species.

=== Maternal ===
Maternal infanticide occurs when newborn offspring are killed by their mother. This is sometimes seen in pigs, a behavior known as savaging, which affects up to 5% of gilts. Similar behavior has been observed in various animals such as rabbits, hamsters, burying beetles, mice and humans.

=== Paternal ===
Paternal infanticide—where fathers eat their own offspring—may also occur. When young bass hatch from the spawn, the father guards the area, circling around them and keeping them together, as well as providing protection from would-be predators. After a few days, most of the fish will swim away. At this point the male's behavior changes: instead of defending the stragglers, he treats them as any other small prey, and eats them.

=== Worker caste killing young ===
Honey bees may become infected with a bacterial disease called foul brood, which attacks the developing bee larva while still living in the cell. Some hives however have evolved a behavioral adaptation that resists this disease: the worker bees selectively kill the infected individuals by removing them from their cells and tossing them out of the hive, preventing it from spreading. The genetics of this behavior are quite complex. Experiments by Rothenbuhler showed that the 'hygienic' behavior of the queen was lost by crossing with a non-hygienic drone. This means that the trait must be recessive, only being expressed when both alleles contain the gene for hygienic behavior. Furthermore, the behavior is dependent on two separate loci. A backcross produced a mixed result. The hives of some offspring were hygienic, while others were not. There was also a third type of hive where workers removed the wax cap of the infected cells, but did nothing more. What was not apparent was the presence of a fourth group who threw diseased larvae out of the hive, but did not have the uncapping gene. This was suspected by Rothenbuhler however, who manually removed the caps, and found some hives proceeded to clear out infected cells.

== Humans and infanticide ==
Infanticide has been, and still is, practiced by some human cultures, groups, or individuals. In many past societies, certain forms of infanticide were considered permissible, whereas in most modern societies the practice is considered immoral and criminal. It still takes place in the Western world usually because of the parent's mental illness or violent behavior, in addition to some poor countries as a form of population control — sometimes with tacit societal acceptance. Female infanticide, a form of sex-selective infanticide, is more common than the killing of male offspring, especially in cultures where male children are more desirable.

Cornell University ethologist Glenn Hausfater states that "infanticide has not received much study because it's a repulsive subject [...] Many people regard it as reprehensible to even think about it." Research into infanticide in animals is in part motivated by the desire to understand human behaviors, such as child abuse. Hausfater explains that researchers are "trying to see if there's any connection between animal infanticide and child abuse, neglect and killing by humans [...] We just don't know yet what the connections are."

== See also ==
- Human infanticide
- Infanticide in carnivores
- Infanticide in primates
- Infanticide in rodents
- Parent–offspring conflict
- Parricide
- Paternal care
- Runt
- Sexual cannibalism
- Sexual selection
- Siblicide
