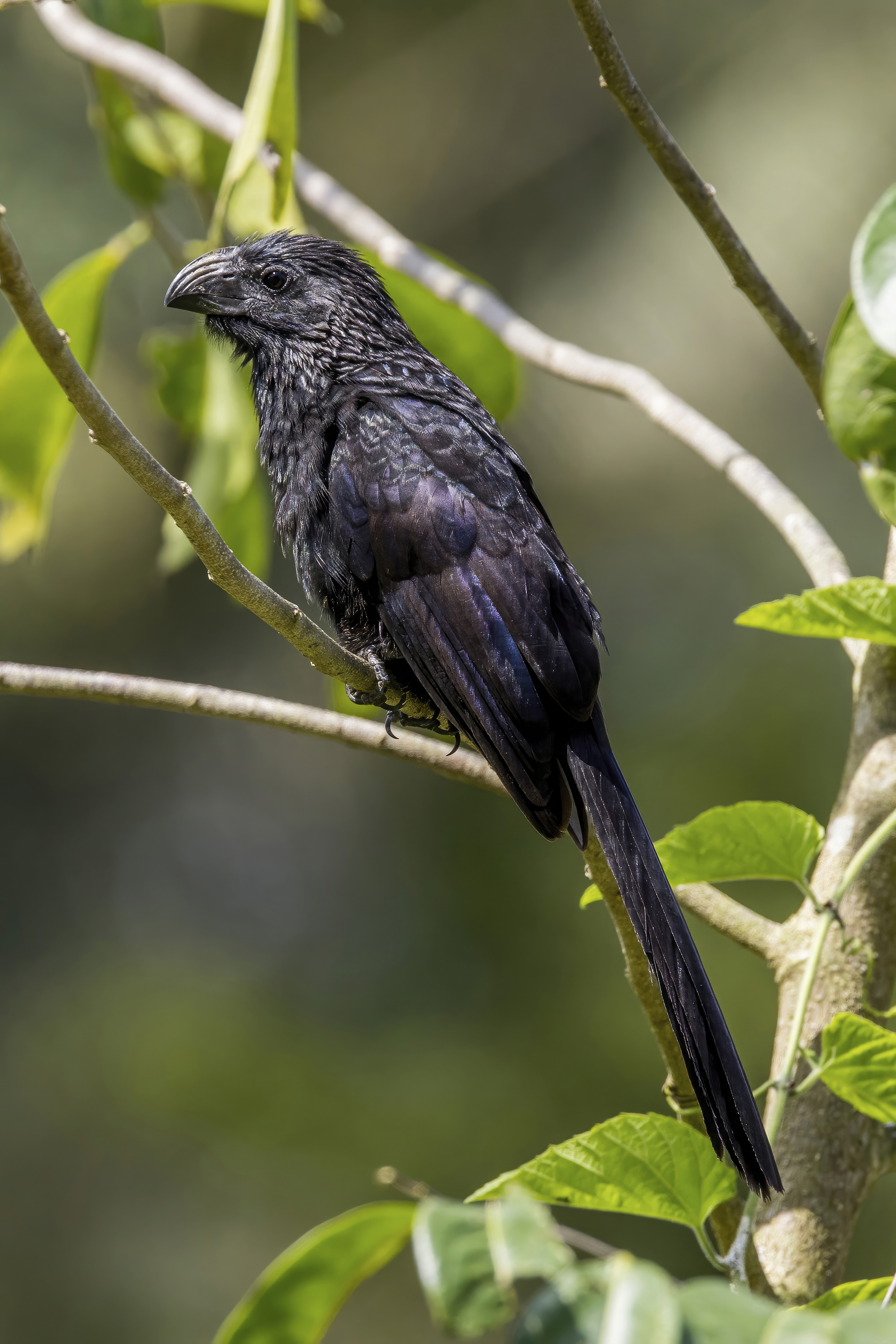
- In Belize

Conservation status
- Least Concern (IUCN 3.1)

Scientific classification
- Kingdom: Animalia
- Phylum: Chordata
- Class: Aves
- Order: Cuculiformes
- Family: Cuculidae
- Genus: Crotophaga
- Species: C. sulcirostris

Binomial name
- Crotophaga sulcirostris Swainson, 1827
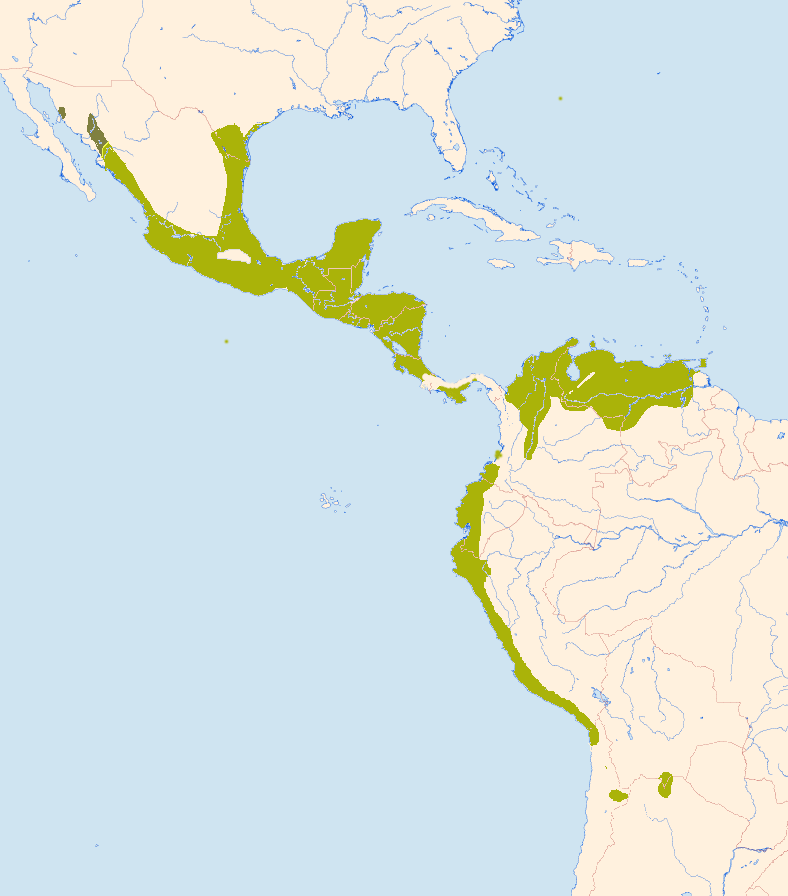
- Range of C. sulcirostris

= Groove-billed ani =

Species of bird

The groove-billed ani (Crotophaga sulcirostris) is a tropical bird in the cuckoo family with a long tail and a large, curved beak. It is a resident species throughout most of its range, from southern Texas, central Mexico and The Bahamas, through Central America, to northern Colombia and Venezuela, and coastal Ecuador and Peru. It only retreats from the northern limits of its range in Texas and northern Mexico during winter.

== Taxonomy ==
The groove-billed ani was formally described by the English naturalist William Swainson from a specimen collected in Temascaltepec, Mexico. It still bears its original binomial name of Crotophaga sulcirostris. The specific epithet combines the Latin sulcus meaning "furrow" with -rostris meaning "-billed". The species is monotypic: no subspecies are recognised.

== Description ==
The groove-billed ani is about 34 cm (13 in) long, and weighs 70–90 g (2.5–3.2 oz). Wingspan ranges 41–46 cm (16–18 in). It is completely black, with a very long tail almost as long as its body. It has a huge bill with lengthwise grooves running the length of the upper mandible. It is very similar to the smooth-billed ani, some specimens of which have bills as small as the groove-billed and with grooves on the basal half. The two species are best distinguished by voice and range. In flight, the ani alternates between quick, choppy flaps and short glides.

== Habitat and diet ==
Like other anis, the groove-billed is found in open and partly open country, such as pastures, savanna, and orchards. It feeds largely on a mixed diet of insects, seeds, and fruits.

== Breeding ==
The groove-billed ani lives in small groups of one to five breeding pairs. They defend a single territory and lay their eggs in one communal nest. All group members incubate the eggs and care for the young.

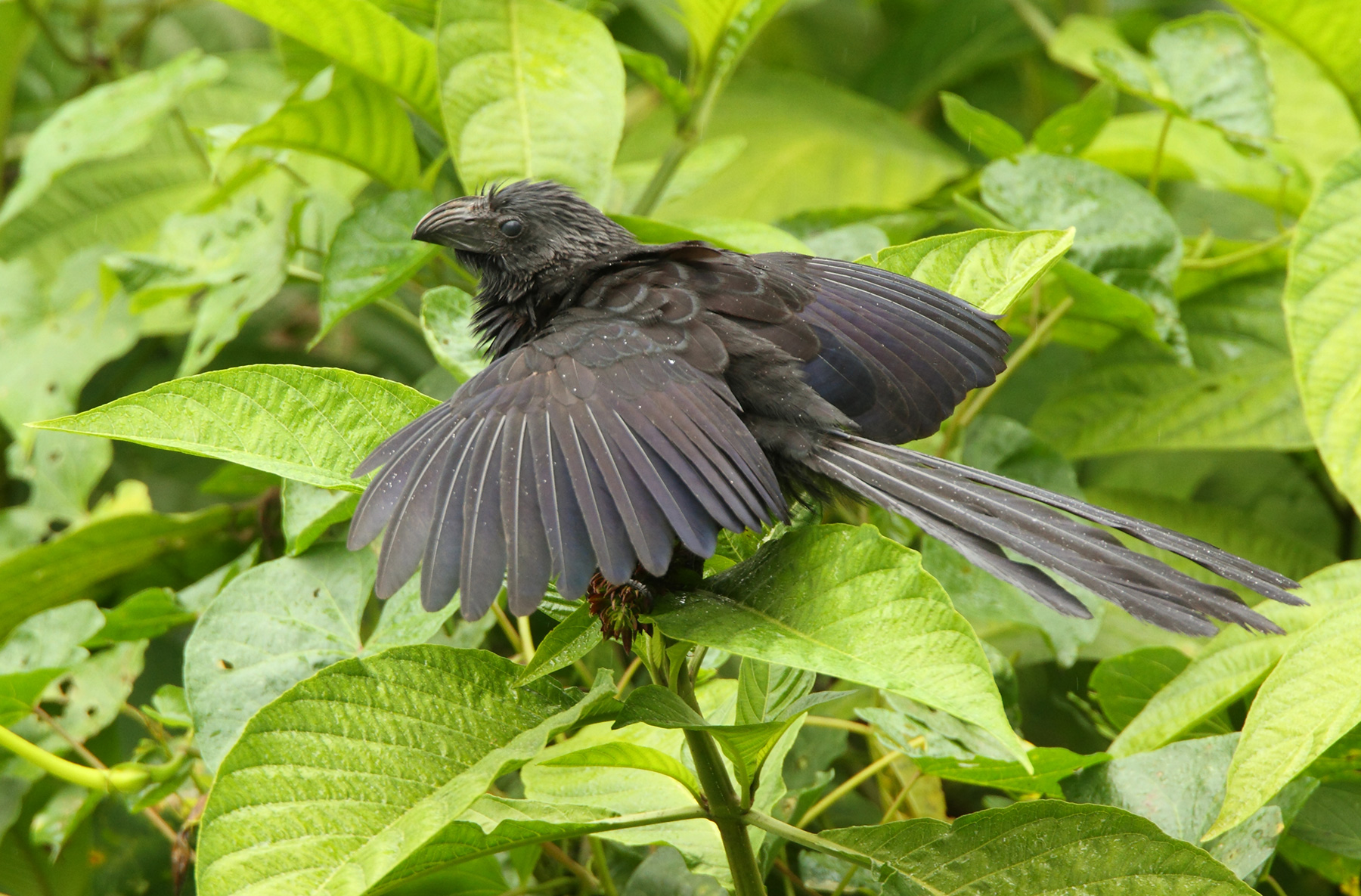
In Turrialba, Costa Rica

== Protected status ==
The groove-billed ani is protected under the Migratory Bird Treaty Act of 1918.
