= Infanticide in rodents =

Termination or consumption of newborn rodents by the parent or another rodent

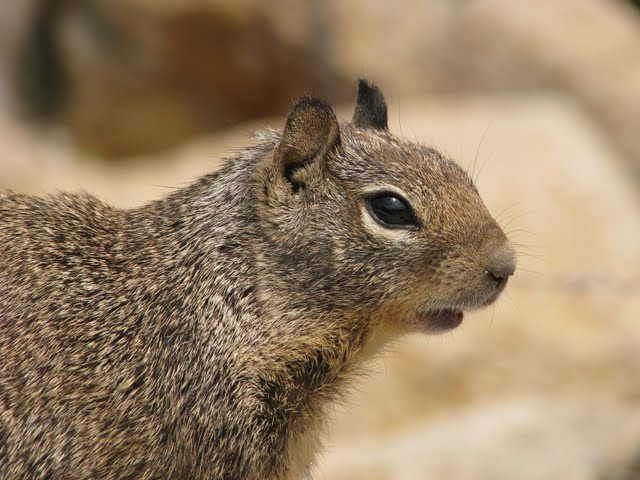
California ground squirrel, one species known to show infanticide behaviour

Infanticide is the termination of a neonate after it has been born, and in zoology this is often the termination or consumption of newborn animals by either a parent or an unrelated adult. In several rodents, it has been found that the mother may commit infanticide shortly after parturition under conditions of high stress (parental infanticide), or unrelated males and females may kill neonates (nonparental infanticide).

== Parental infanticide ==
Parental infanticide is perhaps the most confusing behaviour to understand, as in many cases it can seem maladaptive for a parent to terminate offspring carrying its own genetic material. However, studies in mice have indicated infanticide may be a genetically heritable trait, and may even have a learned element, so there is clearly more to the behaviour than might be expected. The occurrence of infanticide seems to vary within rodent species between parents. For example, male meadow voles and house mice can be classed as either 'infanticidal' or 'non-infanticidal' depending on their history with other litters they have sired, although studies have shown that females do not discriminate between these classes when choosing a mate. Furthermore, recent studies in rodents have shown that infanticide is influenced by various hormones such as: prolactin, corticosterone, and progesterone.

Evidence from studies on female cooperative breeding Mongolian gerbils indicated that type of living environment influences hormone concentrations of progesterone and prolactin. To investigate living environment effects, female gerbils in three housing groups (FH-family housed, PH-pair mate housed, and SH- singly housed) were observed and compared to each other. Unfamiliar pups were placed in a cage with each female to observe any infanticide response. Following the pup test samples of prolactin and progesterone were taken via blood. Analyses showed that females with lower progesterone (FH group) and prolactin levels rarely displayed infanticidal behavior toward the unfamiliar pup, compared to the females that possessed higher levels, in which they attacked the pup. These results show that cohabitation with family contributes to lower progesterone and prolactin concentrations in female Mongolian gerbils, which is shown to decrease the likelihood that infanticide will occur.

A further study investigated the role of living environment with younger siblings on infanticide in female and male cooperative breeding Mongolian gerbils. Female and male gerbils were put into one of four housing conditions (parents only, parents and siblings, siblings, and unrelated). Again, a pup test was conducted (same as previous study above), with each male and female to observe responses to an unfamiliar pup in the cage, while progesterone was measured via blood sample following the test. Females portrayed attacking behavior toward the unfamiliar pup when progesterone concentrations were elevated compared to the females with low concentrations (parents and siblings). Thus, these results have demonstrated further support that living with parents and siblings contributes strongly to lower levels of progesterone, causing inhibition of infanticide in female Mongolian gerbils.

Researchers have found evidence on maternal care and infanticide in female mice that were pregnant or lactating, when placed in a dangerous or safe environment. Female mice were placed in soiled bedding, with unfamiliar fecal cues of males which modeled a dangerous environment (UMB), or they were placed in a safe environment (NB) with neutral bedding. Corticosterone levels were measured via fecal metabolites after exposure to the assigned bedding. Female mice in the dangerous living environment group, showed higher levels of fecal corticosterone, and minimal maternal care compared to the females in the safe environment group. Furthermore, a dangerous environment inherently provides infanticide threats to female mice, increasing the likelihood that corticosterone concentrations will increase, while maternal care toward offspring decreases.

In a study on mated male mice, there is evidence shown that when progesterone receptors are tampered with, using an antagonist, infanticide behavior is declined, while caregiving is increased. Males were observed with their mate to evaluate parental behavior, and then were administered implants by capsules filled with sesame oil, or progesterone plus sesame oil, along with RU486 pellets as the antagonist. Aggressive behavior was measured by response toward litters, and progesterone was measured by blood samples. Results indicated that PRKO mice (the knock-out mice) did not commit infanticide, but showed more paternal behavior, in comparison to the C57BL/6 strain mice that committed infanticide. Thus, this indicates that aggression and paternal behavior in mated male mice is linked to progesterone receptors; that is, when progesterone receptors are blocked by RU486 antagonist, males are less aggressive, and more paternal toward offspring.

== Nonparental infanticide ==
Some rodent species (most typically males) will take the chance to kill neonates that are unrelated to them should opportunity permit. There is thought to be several benefits by doing so, which not only include nutrition benefits (particularly where food is in short supply) but also non-direct benefits, such as allowing access to more resources, improving reproductive opportunities and the retainment of energy and resources that might otherwise be spent on unrelated offspring. A common causal factor of infanticide, particularly among sciurid rodents, is direct resource competition, therefore killing the pups of an unrelated neighbour would prevent resource competition with those individuals in the future.

== Species known to commit infanticide ==
Work by Blumstein (2000) highlighted the following rodent species which have previously been associated with infanticide in published scientific literature. Assessment of these traits lead Blumstein to conclude that infanticide evolved independently in sciuromorphs, myomorphs and caviomorphs.

- Tree squirrel
- California ground squirrel
- Golden marmot
- Alpine marmot
- Yellow-bellied marmot
- Franklin's ground squirrel
- 13-lined ground squirrel
- Uinta ground squirrel
- Belding's ground squirrel
- Black-tailed prairie dog
- Gunnison's prairie dog
- Richardson's ground squirrel
- Arctic ground squirrel
- Columbian ground squirrel
- Townsend's ground squirrel
- Meadow vole
- Montane vole
- Townsend's vole
- Gray-tailed vole
- California vole
- Prairie vole
- Woodland vole
- Field vole
- Root vole
- Sagebrush vole
- Brandt's vole
- Northern red-backed vole
- Red-backed vole
- Bank vole
- Muskrat
- Water vole
- Collared lemming
- Norway lemming
- Djungarian hamster
- Siberian hamster
- Syrian hamster
- Desert woodrat
- Deer mice
- White-footed mouse
- California mouse
- Wood mouse
- Norway rat
- Spiny mouse
- Mongolian gerbil
- Guinea pig
- Cui

== Exceptions ==
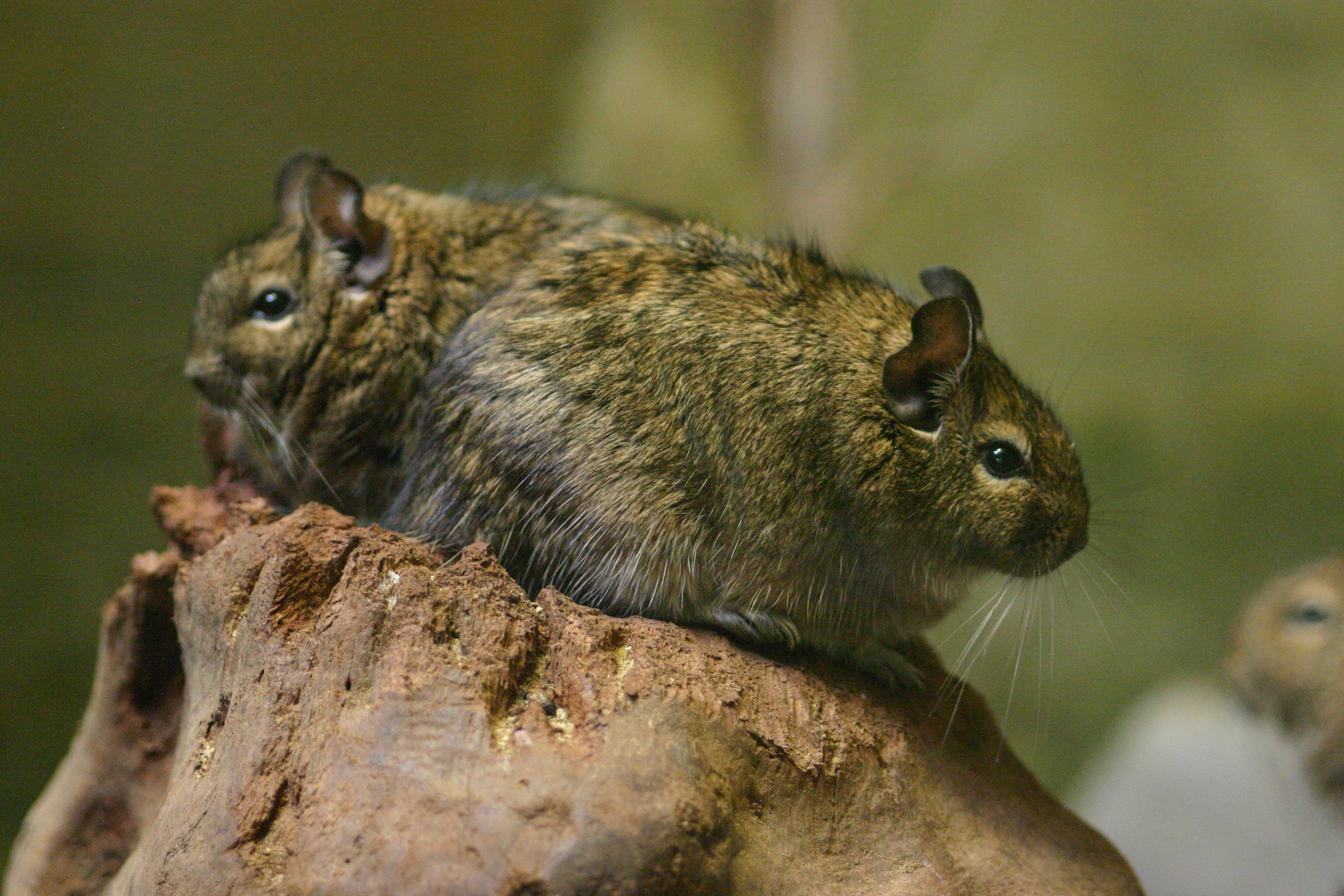
Common degus do not show this behaviour.

Not all rodent species commit infanticide, and in fact some species are remarkable for their lack of this behaviour. One such species is the common degu, a highly social caviomorph rodent from central Chile. Common degus have been found not to harm even unfamiliar pups, and male degus will even accept other males' litters into a group without problems. This is thought to be related to the communal nesting habits of the species and reflects genetic trends rather than a lack of the conditions that lead to infanticide.
