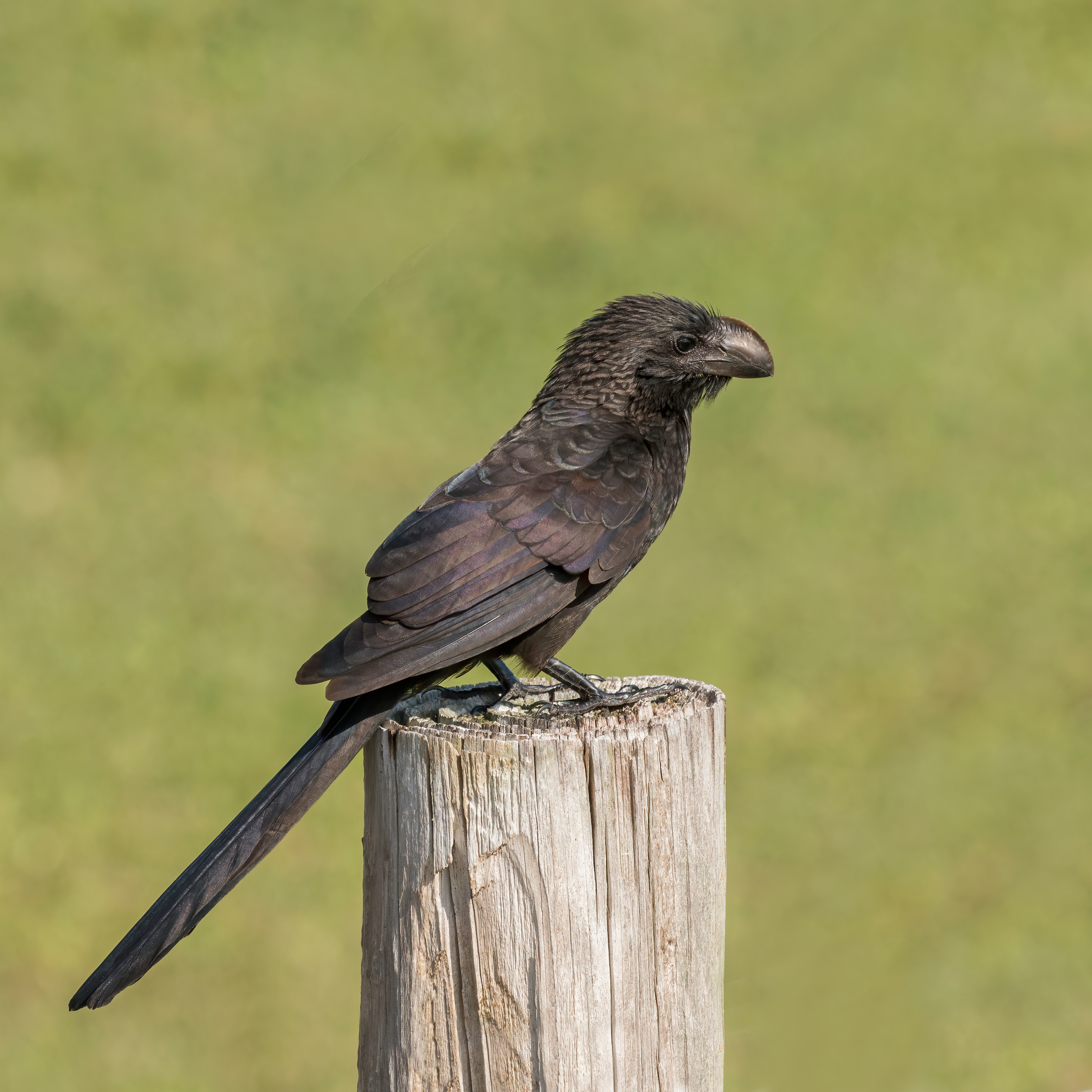
- in Grand Cayman

Conservation status
- Least Concern (IUCN 3.1)

Scientific classification
- Kingdom: Animalia
- Phylum: Chordata
- Class: Aves
- Order: Cuculiformes
- Family: Cuculidae
- Genus: Crotophaga
- Species: C. ani

Binomial name
- Crotophaga ani Linnaeus, 1758
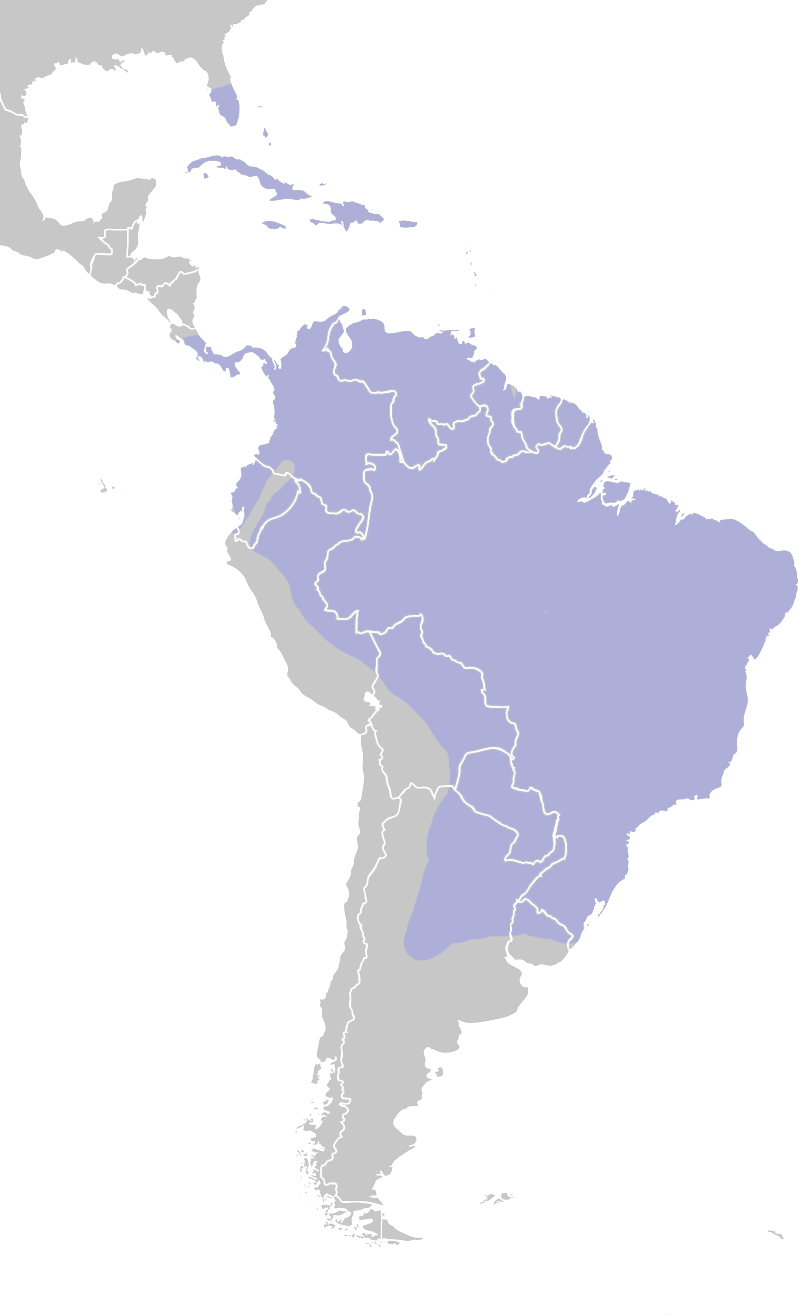

= Smooth-billed ani =

Species of bird

The smooth-billed ani (Crotophaga ani) is a bird in the cuckoo family. It is a resident breeding species from southern Florida, the Caribbean, parts of Central America, south to western Ecuador, Brazil, northern Argentina and southern Chile. It was introduced to Galápagos around the 1960s and is potentially impacting native and endemic species across the archipelago.

== Taxonomy ==
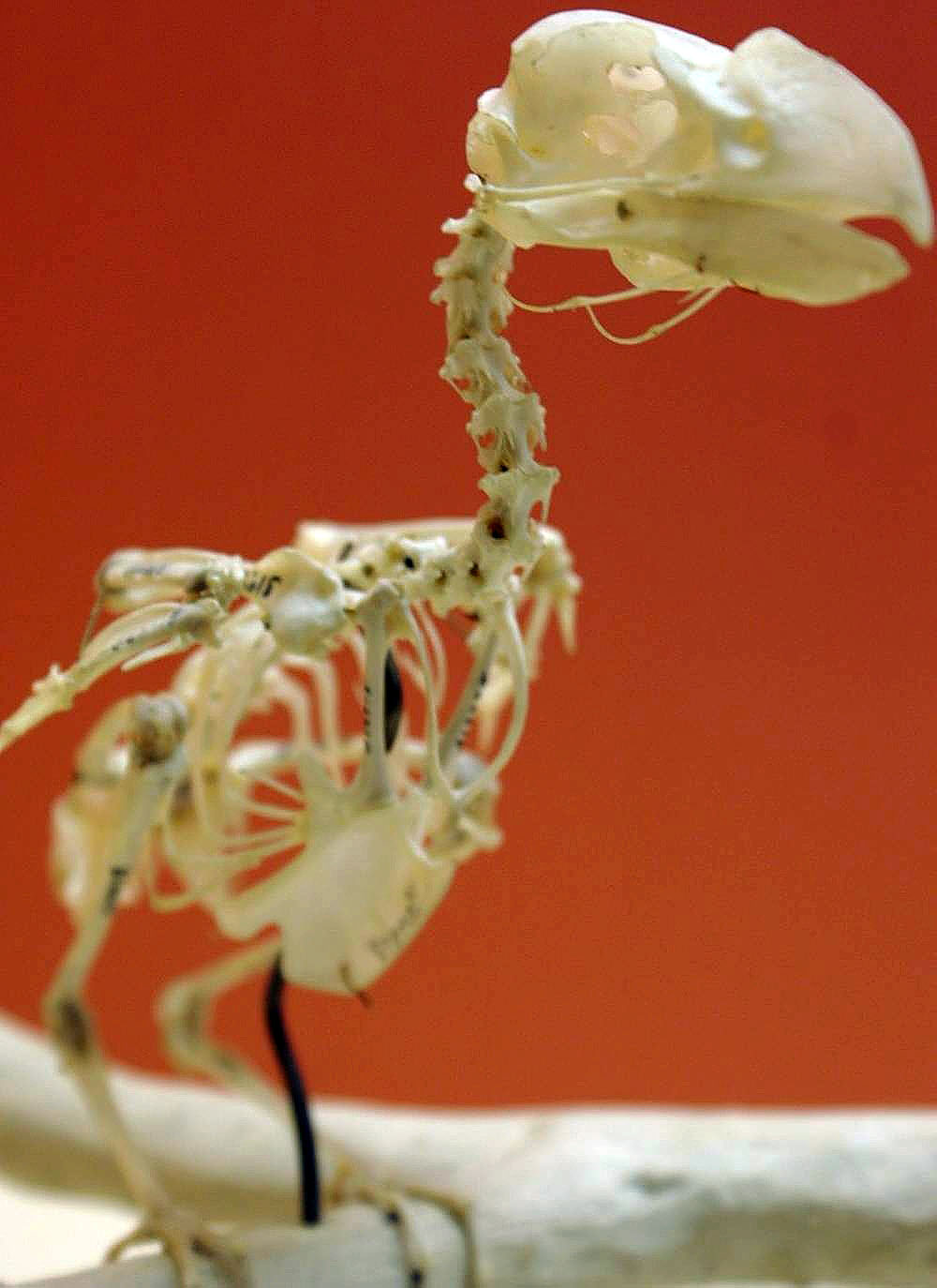
Skeleton

The smooth-billed ani was described and illustrated in 1648 by the German naturalist Georg Marcgrave in his Historia Naturalis Brasiliae. He used the name "Ani" but did not explain the origin of the word. It probably comes from the word Anim in the Tupi language which means "social bird". In 1756 the Irish physician Patrick Browne used the name Crotophaga for the species in his The Civil and Natural History of Jamaica. Browne's name combines the Ancient Greek krotōn meaning "tick" with -phagos meaning "-eating". Browne wrote that the smooth-billed anis "live chiefly upon ticks and other small vermin; and may be frequently seen jumping about all cows and oxen in the fields". When the Swedish naturalist Carl Linnaeus updated his Systema Naturae for the tenth edition in 1758 he included the smooth-billed ani. He placed it in its own genus Crotophaga and coined the binomial name Crotophaga ani. The type locality is Jamaica. The species is monotypic: no subspecies are recognised.

== Description ==
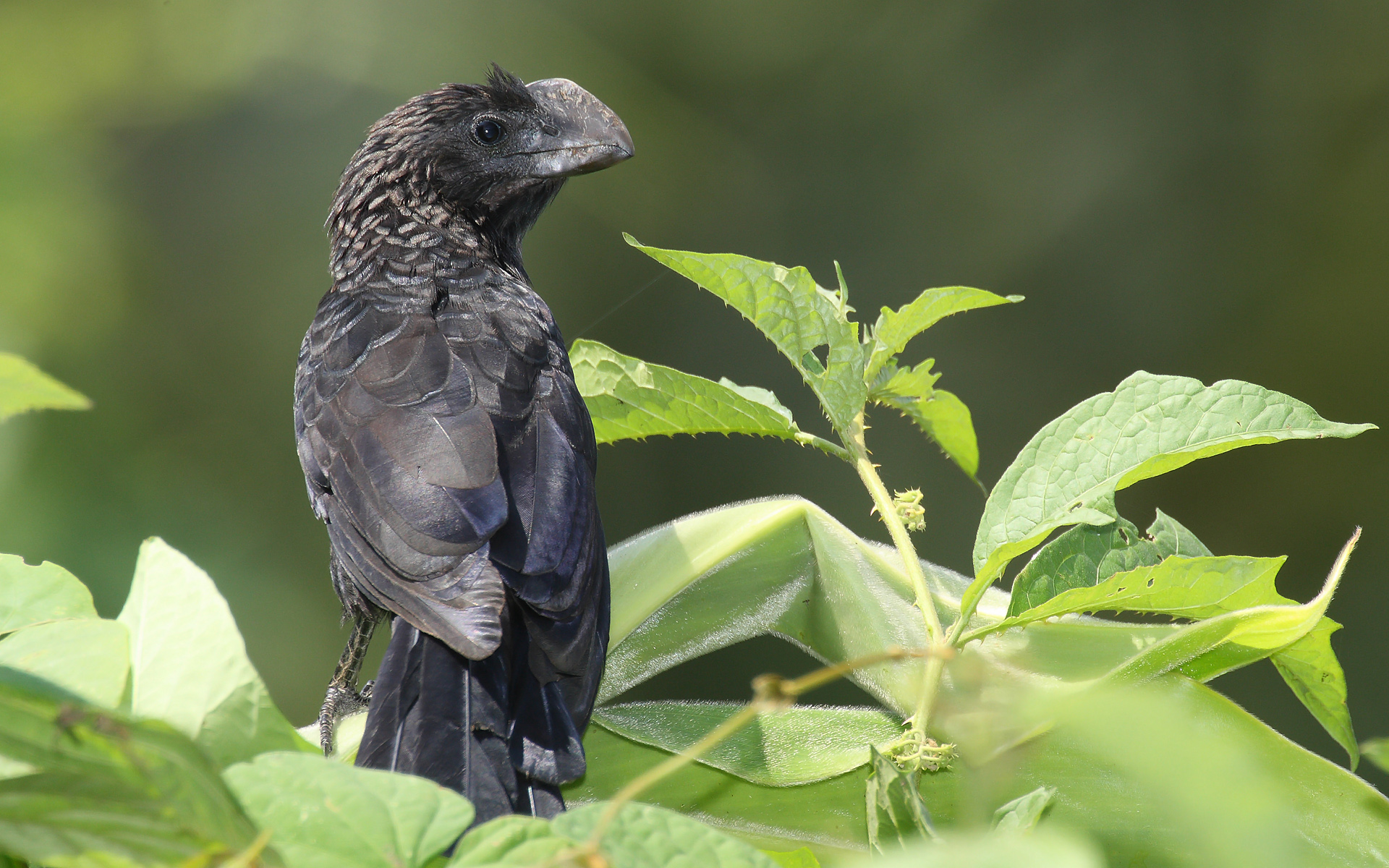
In Panama

The smooth-billed ani is a mid-sized species, larger on average than the groove-billed ani but smaller than the greater ani. It measures approximately 35 cm (14 in) in overall length. Males weigh around 115 g (4.1 oz) while females are lighter and with a weight of around 95 g (3.4 oz). The adult is mainly glossy black, with a long tail, deep ridged black bill and a brown iris. The flight is weak and wobbly, but the bird runs well and usually feeds on the ground. This species is called "el pijul" in Venezuelan folklore. The calls include a whining ooo-leeek.

== Distribution and habitat ==
This ani is found in open and semi-open country and areas under cultivation. This common and conspicuous species has greatly benefited from deforestation.

== Behaviour ==
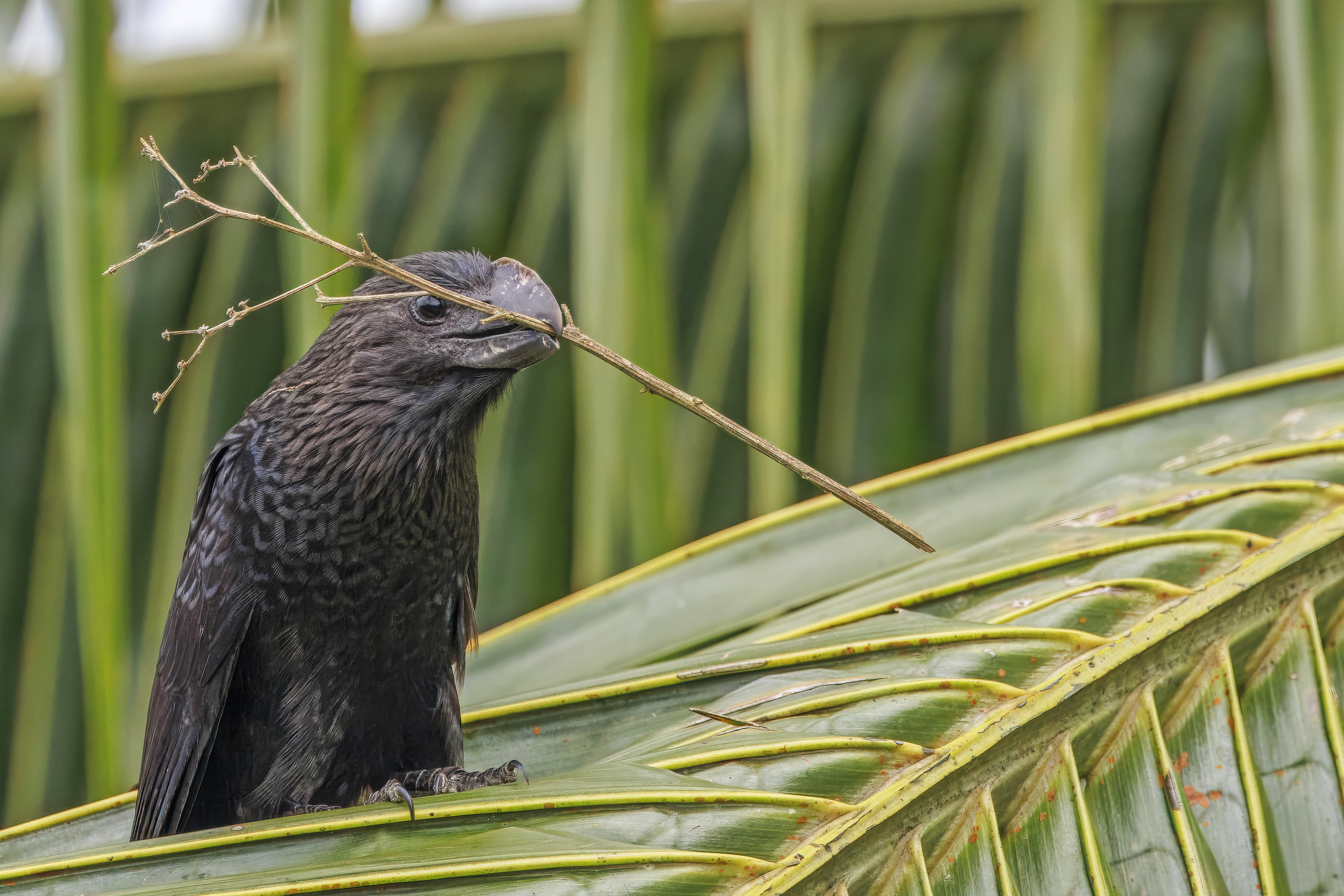
Smooth-billed ani carrying stick for building nest in Ecuador

This is a very gregarious species, always found in noisy groups.

=== Breeding ===
The nest, built communally by several pairs, is a deep cup made of twigs and lined with leaves and placed usually 2–6 m (6.6–19.7 ft) high in a tree. A number of females lay their chalky blue eggs in the nest and then share incubation and feeding. Each female is capable of laying up to seven eggs, and nests have been found containing up to 29 eggs, but it is rare for more than ten to hatch. Incubation is 13–15 days, with another 10 days to fledging. Up to three broods may be raised in a season, with the young of earlier broods helping to feed more recent chicks.

=== Food and feeding ===
The smooth-billed ani feeds on termites, large insects, other invertebrates and even lizards, frogs, eggs and hatchlings of other birds, and fruit. They will occasionally remove ticks and other parasites from grazing animals.

== Conservation status ==
The smooth-billed ani is considered Least Concern according to the IUCN Red List. Declines in the South Florida population were recorded as the state delayed its protection decision for the species.

== Gallery ==
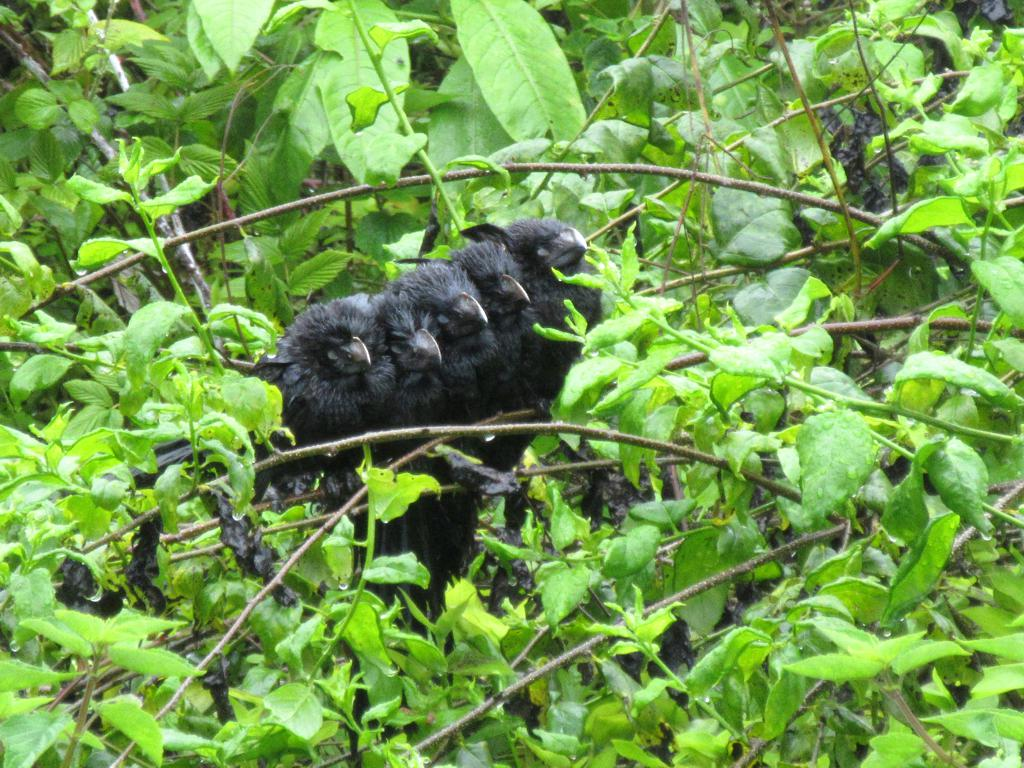
In the Galápagos

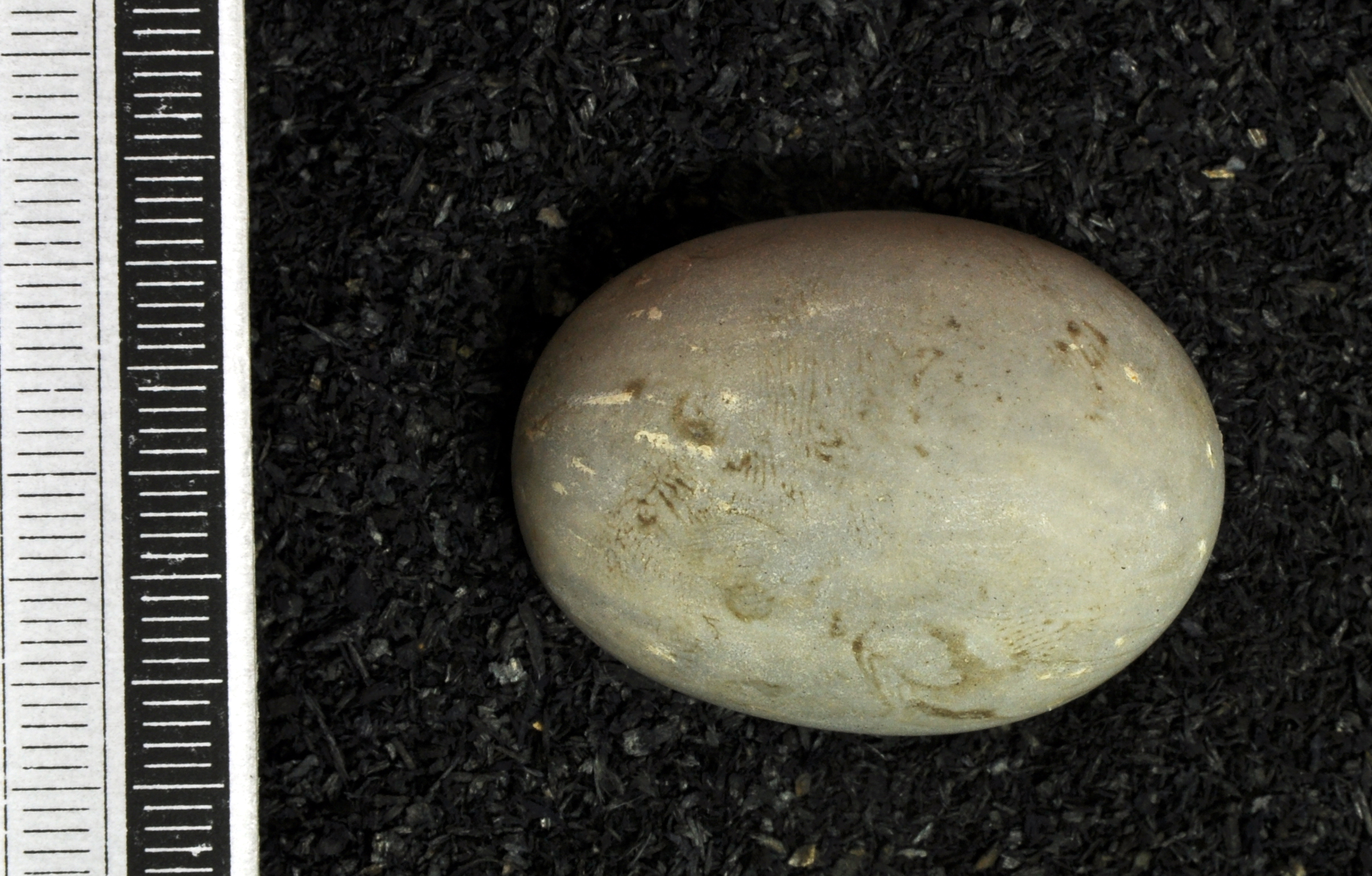
Egg, Collection Museum Wiesbaden

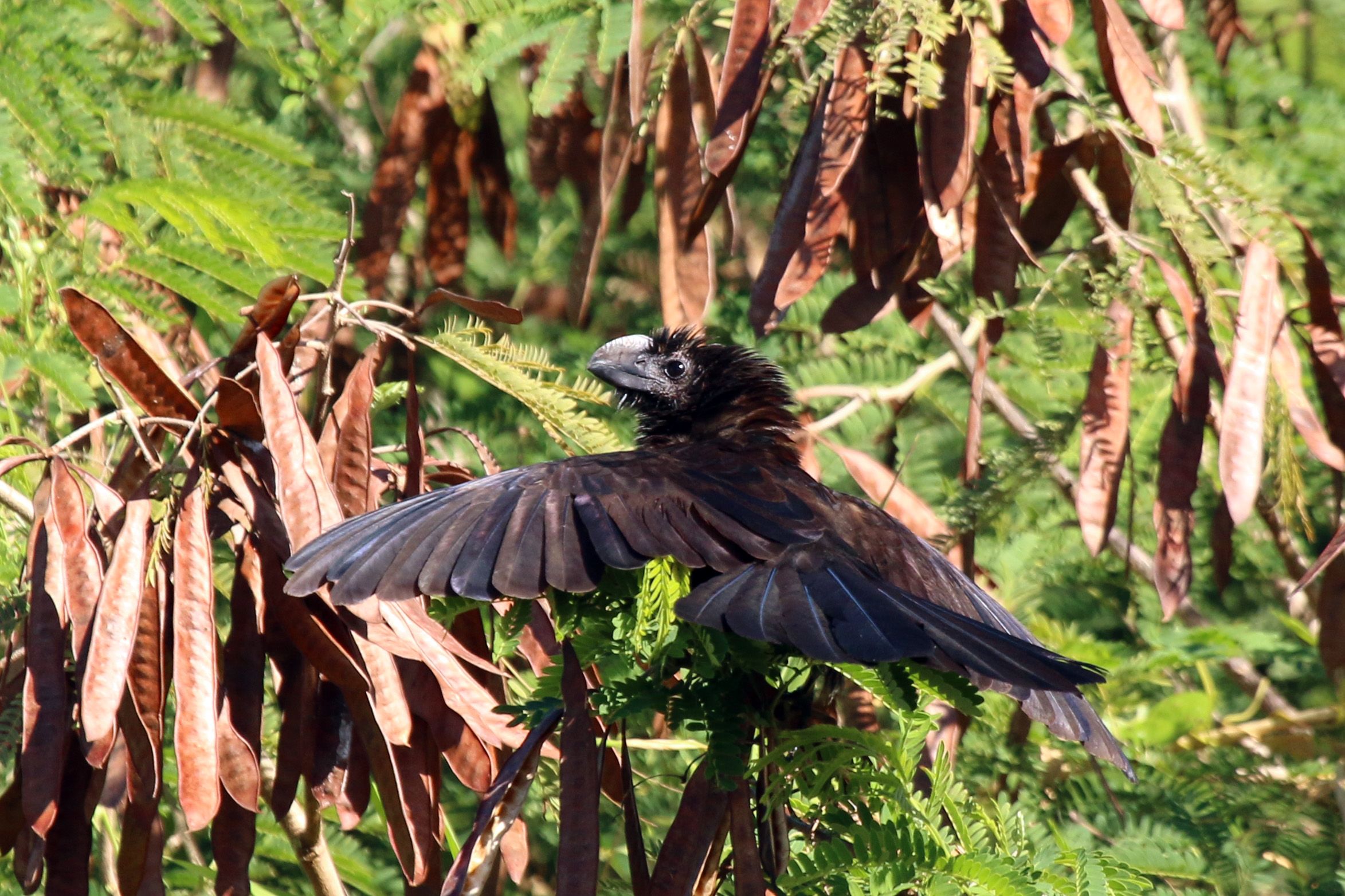
In Tobago

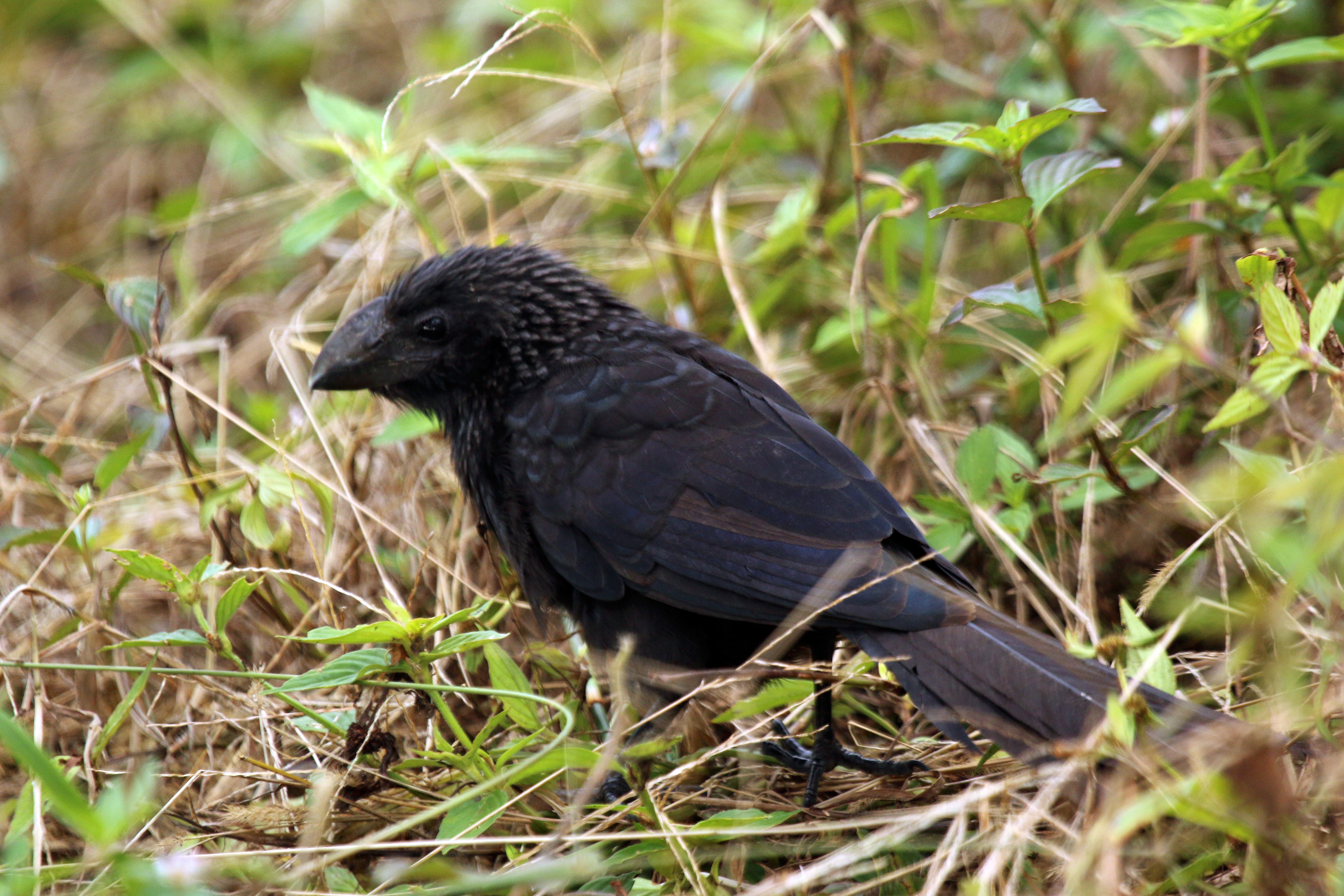
In Jamaica

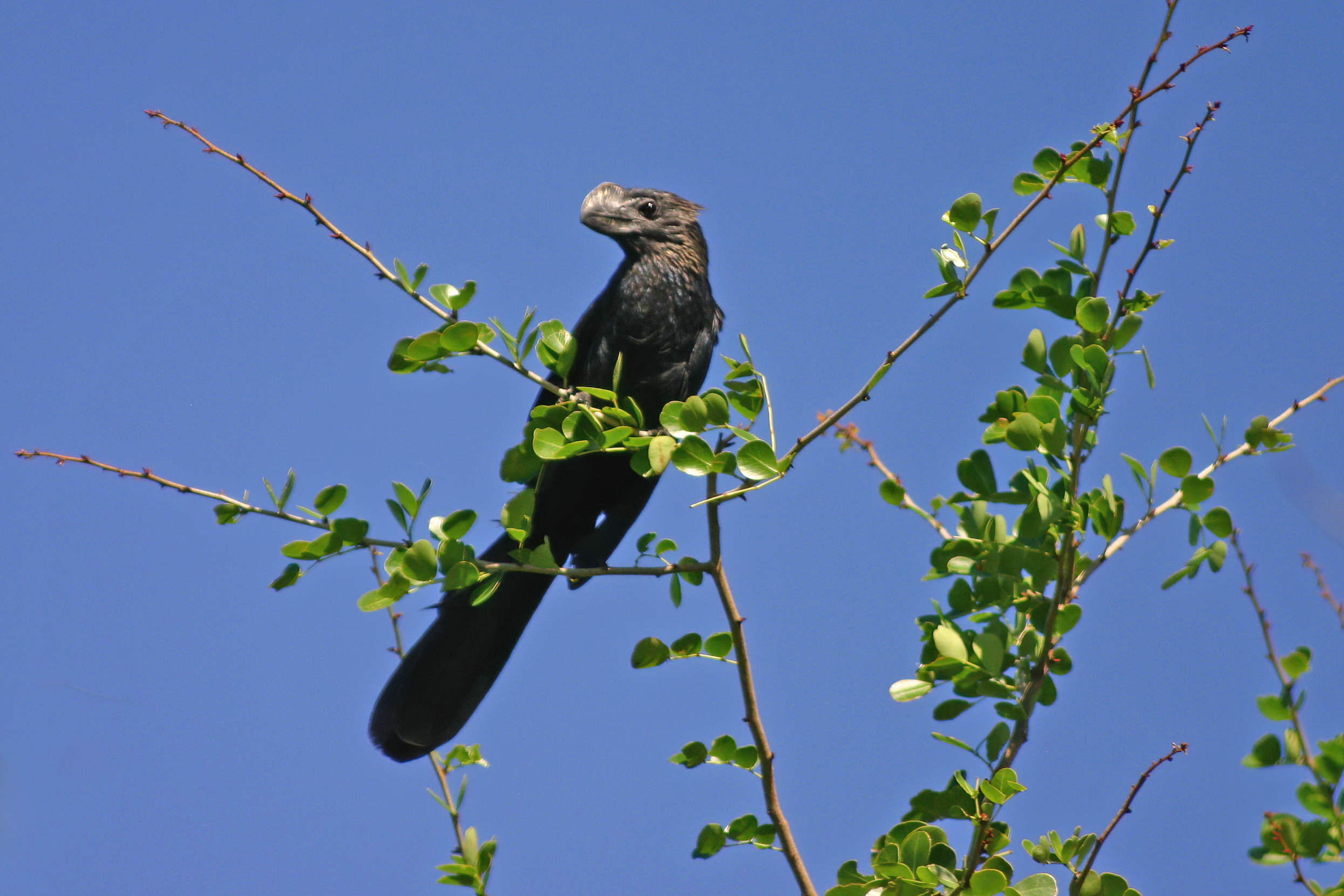
In Dominica

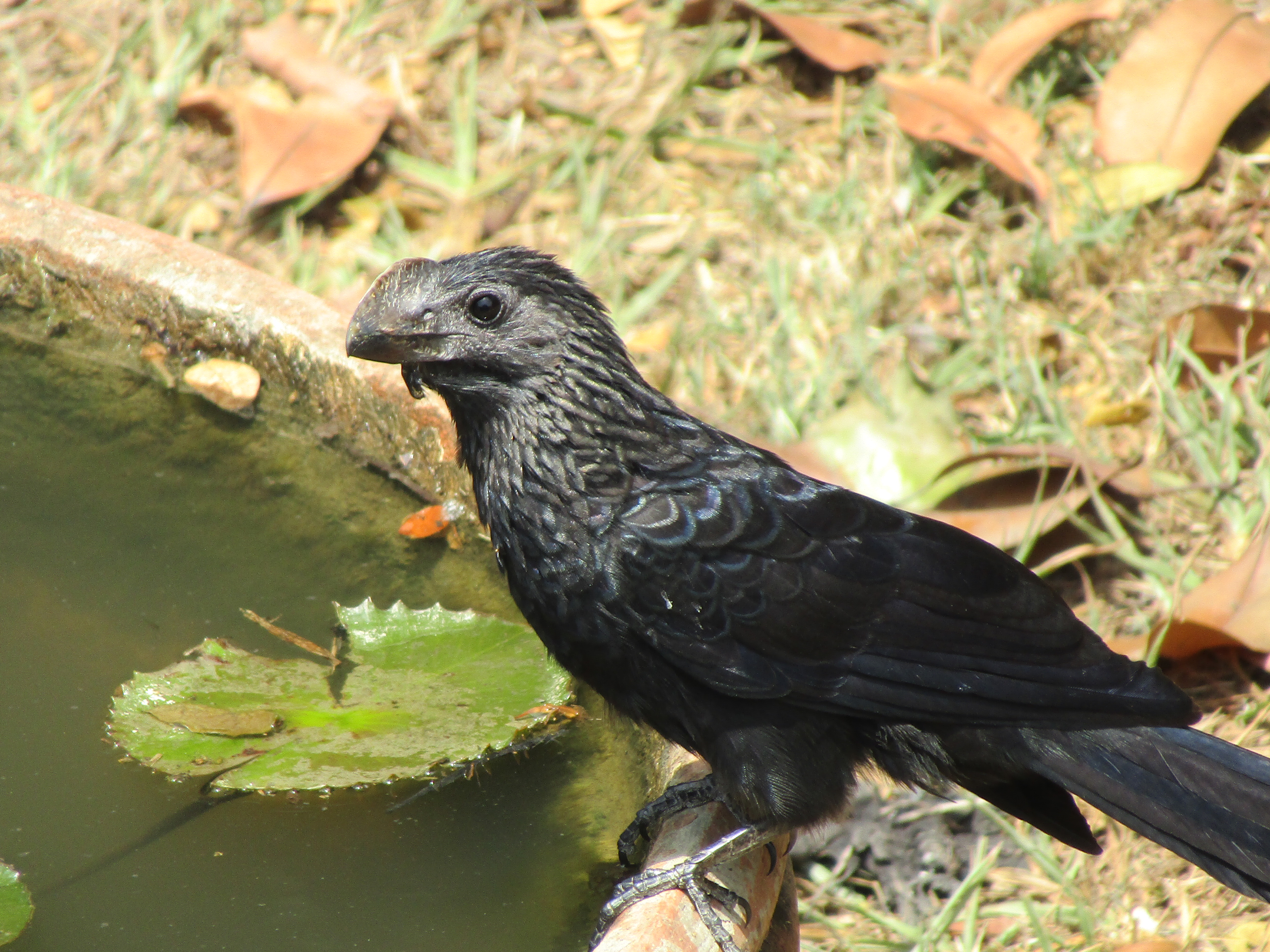
In Colombia

== Sources ==
- Jobling, James A. (2010). The Helm Dictionary of Scientific Bird Names. London: Christopher Helm. ISBN 978-1-4081-2501-4.
