= List of cuckoos =

The International Ornithological Committee (IOC) recognizes these 156 species of cuckoos in the family Cuculidae. In addition to the 91 species whose name includes "cuckoo", the family includes anis, roadrunners, coucals, couas, malkohas, and koels. They are distributed among 35 genera, some of which have only one species. Two extinct species (E), the snail-eating coua and the St. Helena cuckoo, are included.

This list is presented according to the IOC taxonomic sequence and can also be sorted alphabetically by common name and binomial.

Common name	Binomial name + authority	IOC sequence
Guira cuckoo	Guira guira (Gmelin, JF, 1788)	1
Greater ani	Crotophaga major Gmelin, JF, 1788	2
Smooth-billed ani	Crotophaga ani Linnaeus, 1758	3
Groove-billed ani	Crotophaga sulcirostris Swainson, 1827	4
Striped cuckoo	Tapera naevia (Linnaeus, 1766)	5
Pheasant cuckoo	Dromococcyx phasianellus (Spix, 1824)	6
Pavonine cuckoo	Dromococcyx pavoninus Pelzeln, 1870	7
Lesser ground cuckoo	Morococcyx erythropygus (Lesson, RP, 1842)	8
Greater roadrunner	Geococcyx californianus (Lesson, RP, 1829)	9
Lesser roadrunner	Geococcyx velox (Wagner, 1836)	10
Rufous-vented ground cuckoo	Neomorphus geoffroyi (Temminck, 1820)	11
Scaled ground cuckoo	Neomorphus squamiger Todd, 1925	12
Banded ground cuckoo	Neomorphus radiolosus Sclater, PL & Salvin, 1878	13
Rufous-winged ground cuckoo	Neomorphus rufipennis (Gray, GR, 1849)	14
Red-billed ground cuckoo	Neomorphus pucheranii (Deville, 1851)	15
Buff-headed coucal	Centropus milo Gould, 1856	16
White-necked coucal	Centropus ateralbus Lesson, RP, 1826	17
Ivory-billed coucal	Centropus menbeki Lesson, RP & Garnot, 1828	18
Biak coucal	Centropus chalybeus (Salvadori, 1876)	19
Rufous coucal	Centropus unirufus (Cabanis & Heine, 1863)	20
Green-billed coucal	Centropus chlororhynchos Blyth, 1849	21
Black-faced coucal	Centropus melanops Lesson, RP, 1830	22
Black-hooded coucal	Centropus steerii Bourns & Worcester, 1894	23
Short-toed coucal	Centropus rectunguis Strickland, 1847	24
Bay coucal	Centropus celebensis Quoy & Gaimard, 1832	25
Gabon coucal	Centropus anselli Sharpe, 1874	26
Black-throated coucal	Centropus leucogaster (Leach, 1814)	27
Senegal coucal	Centropus senegalensis (Linnaeus, 1766)	28
Blue-headed coucal	Centropus monachus Rüppell, 1837	29
Coppery-tailed coucal	Centropus cupreicaudus Reichenow, 1896	30
White-browed coucal	Centropus superciliosus Hemprich & Ehrenberg, 1829	31
Burchell's coucal	Centropus burchellii Swainson, 1838	32
Sunda coucal	Centropus nigrorufus (Cuvier, 1816)	33
Greater coucal	Centropus sinensis (Stephens, 1815)	34
Malagasy coucal	Centropus toulou (Müller, PLS, 1776)	35
Goliath coucal	Centropus goliath Bonaparte, 1850	36
Black coucal	Centropus grillii Hartlaub, 1861	37
Philippine coucal	Centropus viridis (Scopoli, 1786)	38
Lesser coucal	Centropus bengalensis (Gmelin, JF, 1788)	39
Violaceous coucal	Centropus violaceus Quoy & Gaimard, 1832	40
Black-billed coucal	Centropus bernsteini Schlegel, 1866	41
Kai coucal	Centropus spilopterus Gray, GR, 1858	42
Pheasant coucal	Centropus phasianinus (Latham, 1801)	43
Andaman coucal	Centropus andamanensis Beavan, 1867	44
Bornean ground cuckoo	Carpococcyx radiceus (Temminck, 1832)	45
Sumatran ground cuckoo	Carpococcyx viridis Salvadori, 1879	46
Coral-billed ground cuckoo	Carpococcyx renauldi Oustalet, 1896	47
Snail-eating coua	Coua delalandei (Temminck, 1827) (E)	48
Crested coua	Coua cristata (Linnaeus, 1766)	49
Verreaux's coua	Coua verreauxi Grandidier, A, 1867	50
Blue coua	Coua caerulea (Linnaeus, 1766)	51
Red-capped coua	Coua ruficeps Gray, GR, 1846	52
Olive-capped coua	Coua olivceiceps Sharpe, 1873	53
Red-fronted coua	Coua reynaudii Pucheran, 1845	54
Coquerel's coua	Coua coquereli Grandidier, A, 1867	55
Running coua	Coua cursor Grandidier, A, 1867	56
Giant coua	Coua gigas (Boddaert, 1783)	57
Red-breasted coua	Coua serriana Pucheran, 1845	58
Raffles's malkoha	Rhinortha chlorophaea (Raffles, 1822)	59
Blue malkoha	Ceuthmochares aereus (Vieillot, 1817)	60
Green malkoha	Ceuthmochares australis Sharpe, 1873	61
Sirkeer malkoha	Taccocua leschenaultii Lesson, RP, 1830	62
Red-billed malkoha	Zanclostomus javanicus (Horsfield, 1821)	63
Yellow-billed malkoha	Rhamphococcyx calyorhynchus (Temminck, 1825)	64
Chestnut-breasted malkoha	Phaenicophaeus curvirostris (Shaw, 1810)	65
Mentawai malkoha	Phaenicophaeus oeneicaudus (Verreaux, J & Verreaux, É, 1855)	66
Red-faced malkoha	Phaenicophaeus pyrrhocephalus (Pennant, 1769)	67
Chestnut-bellied malkoha	Phaenicophaeus sumatranus (Raffles, 1822)	68
Blue-faced malkoha	Phaenicophaeus viridirostris (Jerdon, 1840)	69
Black-bellied malkoha	Phaenicophaeus diardi (Lesson, RP, 1830)	70
Green-billed malkoha	Phaenicophaeus tristis (Lesson, RP, 1830)	71
Rough-crested malkoha	Dasylophus superciliosus (Dumont, 1823)	72
Scale-feathered malkoha	Dasylophus cumingi (Fraser, 1839)	73
Chestnut-winged cuckoo	Clamator coromandus (Linnaeus, 1766)	74
Great spotted cuckoo	Clamator glandarius (Linnaeus, 1758)	75
Levaillant's cuckoo	Clamator levaillantii (Swainson, 1829)	76
Jacobin cuckoo	Clamator jacobinus (Boddaert, 1783)	77
Little cuckoo	Coccycua minuta (Vieillot, 1817)	78
Dwarf cuckoo	Coccycua pumila (Strickland, 1852)	79
Ash-colored cuckoo	Coccycua cinerea (Vieillot, 1817)	80
Squirrel cuckoo	Piaya cayana (Linnaeus, 1766)	81
Black-bellied cuckoo	Piaya melanogaster (Vieillot, 1817)	82
Dark-billed cuckoo	Coccyzus melacoryphus Vieillot, 1817	83
Yellow-billed cuckoo	Coccyzus americanus (Linnaeus, 1758)	84
Pearly-breasted cuckoo	Coccyzus euleri Cabanis, 1873	85
Mangrove cuckoo	Coccyzus minor (Gmelin, JF, 1788)	86
Cocos cuckoo	Coccyzus ferrugineus Gould, 1843	87
Black-billed cuckoo	Coccyzus erythropthalmus (Wilson, A, 1811)	88
Grey-capped cuckoo	Coccyzus lansbergi Bonaparte, 1850	89
Chestnut-bellied cuckoo	Coccyzus pluvialis (Gmelin, JF, 1788)	90
Bay-breasted cuckoo	Coccyzus rufigularis Hartlaub, 1852	91
Jamaican lizard cuckoo	Coccyzus vetula (Linnaeus, 1758)	92
Great lizard cuckoo	Coccyzus merlini (d'Orbigny, 1839)	93
Puerto Rican lizard cuckoo	Coccyzus vieilloti (Bonaparte, 1850)	94
Hispaniolan lizard cuckoo	Coccyzus longirostris (Hermann, 1783)	95
Thick-billed cuckoo	Pachycoccyx audeberti (Schlegel, 1879)	96
Dwarf koel	Microdynamis parva (Salvadori, 1876)	97
Asian koel	Eudynamys scolopaceus (Linnaeus, 1758)	98
Black-billed koel	Eudynamys melanorhynchus Müller, S, 1843	99
Pacific koel	Eudynamys orientalis (Linnaeus, 1766)	100
Long-tailed koel	Urodynamis taitensis (Sparrman, 1787)	101
Channel-billed cuckoo	Scythrops novaehollandiae Latham, 1790	102
Asian emerald cuckoo	Chrysococcyx maculatus (Gmelin, JF, 1788)	103
Violet cuckoo	Chrysococcyx xanthorhynchus (Horsfield, 1821)	104
Diederik cuckoo	Chrysococcyx caprius (Boddaert, 1783)	105
Klaas's cuckoo	Chrysococcyx klaas (Stephens, 1815)	106
Yellow-throated cuckoo	Chrysococcyx flavigularis Shelley, 1880	107
African emerald cuckoo	Chrysococcyx cupreus (Shaw, 1792)	108
Long-billed cuckoo	Chalcites megarhynchus (Gray, GR, 1858)	109
Horsfield's bronze cuckoo	Chalcites basalis (Horsfield, 1821)	110
Black-eared cuckoo	Chalcites osculans (Gould, 1847)	111
Rufous-throated bronze cuckoo	Chalcites ruficollis (Salvadori, 1876)	112
Shining bronze cuckoo	Chalcites lucidus (Gmelin, JF, 1788)	113
White-eared bronze cuckoo	Chalcites meyerii Salvadori, 1874	114
Little bronze cuckoo	Chalcites minutillus Gould, 1859	115
Pied bronze cuckoo	Chalcites crassirostris Salvadori, 1878	116
Pallid cuckoo	Heteroscenes pallidus (Latham, 1801)	117
White-crowned cuckoo	Caliechthrus leucolophus (Müller, S, 1840)	118
Chestnut-breasted cuckoo	Cacomantis castaneiventris (Gould, 1867)	119
Fan-tailed cuckoo	Cacomantis flabelliformis (Latham, 1801)	120
Banded bay cuckoo	Cacomantis sonneratii (Latham, 1790)	121
Plaintive cuckoo	Cacomantis merulinus (Scopoli, 1786)	122
Grey-bellied cuckoo	Cacomantis passerinus (Vahl, 1797)	123
Sunda brush cuckoo	Cacomantis sepulcralis (Müller, S, 1843)	124
Sulawesi brush cuckoo	Cacomantis virescens (Brüggemann, 1876)	125
Sahul brush cuckoo	Cacomantis variolosus (Vigors & Horsfield, 1827)	126
Manus brush cuckoo	Cacomantis blandus (Rothschild & Hartert, 1914)	127
Solomons brush cuckoo	Cacomantis addendus (Rothschild & Hartert, 1901)	128
Moluccan brush cuckoo	Cacomantis aeruginosus Salvadori, 1878	129
Dusky long-tailed cuckoo	Cercococcyx mechowi Cabanis, 1882	130
Olive long-tailed cuckoo	Cercococcyx olivinus Sassi, 1912	131
Barred long-tailed cuckoo	Cercococcyx montanus Chapin, 1928	132
Philippine drongo-cuckoo	Surniculus velutinus Sharpe, 1877	133
Square-tailed drongo-cuckoo	Surniculus lugubris (Horsfield, 1821)	134
Fork-tailed drongo-cuckoo	Surniculus dicruroides (Hodgson, 1839)	135
Moluccan drongo-cuckoo	Surniculus musschenbroeki Meyer, AB, 1878	136
Moustached hawk-cuckoo	Hierococcyx vagans (Müller, S, 1845)	137
Large hawk-cuckoo	Hierococcyx sparverioides (Vigors, 1832)	138
Dark hawk-cuckoo	Hierococcyx bocki Wardlaw-Ramsay, RG, 1886	139
Common hawk-cuckoo	Hierococcyx varius (Vahl, 1797)	140
Northern hawk-cuckoo	Hierococcyx hyperythrus (Gould, 1856)	141
Philippine hawk-cuckoo	Hierococcyx pectoralis Cabanis & Heine, 1863	142
Malaysian hawk-cuckoo	Hierococcyx fugax (Horsfield, 1821)	143
Hodgson's hawk-cuckoo	Hierococcyx nisicolor (Blyth, 1843)	144
Black cuckoo	Cuculus clamosus Latham, 1801	145
Red-chested cuckoo	Cuculus solitarius Stephens, 1815	146
Lesser cuckoo	Cuculus poliocephalus Latham, 1790	147
Sulawesi cuckoo	Cuculus crassirostris (Walden, 1872)	148
Indian cuckoo	Cuculus micropterus Gould, 1838	149
Madagascar cuckoo	Cuculus rochii Hartlaub, 1863	150
African cuckoo	Cuculus gularis Stephens, 1815	151
Himalayan cuckoo	Cuculus saturatus Blyth, 1843	152
Oriental cuckoo	Cuculus optatus Gould, 1845	153
Sunda cuckoo	Cuculus lepidus Müller, S, 1845	154
Common cuckoo	Cuculus canorus Linnaeus, 1758	155
St. Helena cuckoo	Nannococcyx psix Olson, 1975 (E)	156
