= List of Cuculiformes by population =

This is a list of Cuculiformes species by global population. While numbers are estimates, they have been made by the experts in their fields. For more information on how these estimates were ascertained, see Wikipedia's articles on population biology and population ecology.

This list is incomprehensive, as not all Cuculiformes have had their numbers quantified.

The IOC World Bird List (version 15.1) recognizes 156 species of Cuculiformes, two of which are extinct. This list follows IUCN classifications for species names and taxonomy. Where IUCN classifications differ from other ornithological authorities, alternative names and taxonomies are noted.

Some species included as members of Cuculiformes are extinct:

- Snail-eating coua, or Delalande's coua (Coua delalandei) - last seen in 1834.
- St. Helena cuckoo (Nannococcyx psix) - last seen in 1550.

== Species by global population ==
Common name	Binomial name	Population	Status	Trend	Notes	Image
Black-hooded coucal	Centropus steerii	150-600	CR	▼		
Cocos cuckoo	Coccyzus ferrugineus	250-999	VU	Steady	The total population is probably significantly below 1,000 individuals.	
Bay-breasted cuckoo	Coccyzus rufigularis	300-2,900	EN	▼		
Sumatran ground-cuckoo	Carpococcyx viridis	1,500-6,000	EN	▼		
Puerto Rican lizard-cuckoo	Coccyzus vieilloti	2,200-3,000	LC	Steady	Total population is estimated to be 3,300-4,600 individuals.	
Javan coucal (Sunda coucal)	Centropus nigrorufus	2,500-9,999	VU	▼		
Banded ground-cuckoo	Neomorphus radiolosus	2,500-12,000	VU	▼		
Green-billed coucal	Centropus chlororhynchus	5,000-15,000	VU	▼		
Red-faced malkoha	Phaenicophaeus pyrrhocephalus	5,600-23,000	VU	▼		
Moluccan cuckoo	Cacomantis aeruginosus	6,000-15,000	LC	▼	Values likely an underestimate, given unsurveyed subpopulations on Obi, Buru, and Seram.	
Violaceous coucal	Centropus violaceus	6,700-61,000	LC	▼		
Biak coucal	Centropus chalybeus	>10,000	NT	▼	No population estimates are available. Population "is not thought to be below 10,000 mature individuals."	
Short-toed coucal	Centropus rectunguis	>10,000	VU	▼	The global population size has not been quantified. Population is "considered highly unlikely to meet or approach the population size threshold for listing as threatened (<10,000 mature individuals)."	
Lesser ground-cuckoo	Morococcyx erythropygus	50,000-499,999	LC	▼		Lesser_Ground_Cuckoo_(Morococcyx_erythropygus)
Pheasant cuckoo	Dromococcyx phasianellus	50,000-499,999	LC	▼		
Rufous-vented ground-cuckoo	Neomorphus geoffroyi	63,000-127,000	VU	▼	Total population is estimated to be 95,000-191,000 individuals. Note that IOC taxonomy splits an additional species, the scaled ground-cuckoo, from this species. IUCN/BirdLife International maintain both within N. geoffroyi.	
Mangrove cuckoo	Coccyzus minor	200,000	LC	▼		
Lesser roadrunner	Geococcyx velox	500,000-4,999,999	LC	Steady		
Little cuckoo	Coccycua minuta	500,000-4,999,999	LC	▼		
Striped cuckoo	Tapera naevia	500,000-4,999,999	LC	Steady		
Greater ani	Crotophaga major	500,000-4,999,999	LC	Steady		
Oriental cuckoo	Cuculus optatus	500,000-5,000,000	LC	▼		
Black-billed cuckoo	Coccyzus erythropthalmus	880,000	LC	▼		
Greater roadrunner	Geococcyx californianus	1,400,000	LC	▲		
Groove-billed ani	Crotophaga sulcirostris	2,000,000	LC	▲		
Great spotted cuckoo	Clamator glandarius	3,000,000-10,499,999	LC	Steady		
Yellow-billed cuckoo	Coccyzus americanus	9,600,000	LC	▼		
Smooth-billed ani	Crotophaga ani	20,000,000	LC	Steady		
Common cuckoo	Cuculus canorus	34,600,000-54,400,000	LC	Steady	Preliminary estimate.	

== Species without population estimates ==
Common name	Binomial name	Population	Status	Trend	Notes	Image
Coral-billed ground-cuckoo	Carpococcyx renauldi	unknown	EN	▼		
Bornean ground-cuckoo	Carpococcyx radiceus	unknown	VU	▼		
Giant coua	Coua gigas	unknown	VU	▼		
Black-bellied malkoha	Phaenicophaeus diardi	unknown	NT	▼		
Chestnut-bellied malkoha	Phaenicophaeus sumatranus	unknown	NT	▼		
Andaman coucal	Centropus andamanensis	unknown	LC	▼		
Gabon coucal	Centropus anselli	unknown	LC	Steady		
Pied coucal (White-necked coucal)	Centropus ateralbus	unknown	LC	Steady		
Lesser coucal	Centropus bengalensis	unknown	LC	▲	Several wide-ranging national estimates exist, but total population has not been quantified.	
Black-billed coucal (Lesser black coucal)	Centropus bernsteini	unknown	LC	Steady		
Bay coucal	Centropus celebensis	unknown	LC	▼		
Coppery-tailed coucal	Centropus cupreicaudus	unknown	LC	Steady		
Goliath coucal	Centropus goliath	unknown	LC	▼		
Black coucal	Centropus grillii	unknown	LC	Steady		
Black-throated coucal	Centropus leucogaster	unknown	LC	▼		
Black-faced coucal	Centropus melanops	unknown	LC	▼		
Ivory-billed coucal (Greater black coucal)	Centropus menbeki	unknown	LC	▼		
Buff-headed coucal	Centropus milo	unknown	LC	▼		
Blue-headed coucal	Centropus monachus	unknown	LC	▼		
Pheasant coucal	Centropus phasianinus	unknown	LC	▼		
Senegal coucal	Centropus senegalensis	unknown	LC	▼		
Greater coucal	Centropus sinensis	unknown	LC	Steady	Two wide-ranging national estimates exist, but total population has not been quantified.	
Kai coucal	Centropus spilopterus	unknown	LC	Steady		
White-browed coucal	Centropus superciliosus	unknown	LC	Steady	Note that IOC taxonomy splits an additional species, Burchell's coucal, from this species. IUCN/BirdLife International maintain both within C. superciliosus.	
Malagasy coucal	Centropus toulou	unknown	LC	▼		
Rufous coucal	Centropus unirufus	unknown	LC	▼		
Philippine coucal	Centropus viridis	unknown	LC	Steady		
Chattering yellowbill (Blue malkoha)	Ceuthmochares aereus	unknown	LC	▼	Note that IOC taxonomy splits an additional species, the green malkoha, from this species. IUCN/BirdLife International maintain both within C. aereus.	
Horsfield's bronze-cuckoo	Chalcites basalis	unknown	LC	Steady		
Long-billed cuckoo	Chalcites megarhynchus	unknown	LC	▼		
Black-eared cuckoo	Chalcites osculans	unknown	LC	Steady		
Diederik cuckoo	Chrysococcyx caprius	unknown	LC	Steady		
African emerald cuckoo	Chrysococcyx cupreus	unknown	LC	▼		
Yellow-throated cuckoo	Chrysococcyx flavigularis	unknown	LC	▼		
Klaas's cuckoo	Chrysococcyx klaas	unknown	LC	▼		
Asian emerald cuckoo	Chrysococcyx maculatus	unknown	LC	▼		
Violet cuckoo	Chrysococcyx xanthorhynchus	unknown	LC	▼		
Chestnut-winged cuckoo	Clamator coromandus	unknown	LC	▼	A wide-ranging national estimate exists for China, but total population has not been quantified.	
Jacobin cuckoo	Clamator jacobinus	unknown	LC	Steady		
Levaillant's cuckoo	Clamator levaillantii	unknown	LC	▼		
Ash-colored cuckoo	Coccycua cinerea	unknown	LC	▼		
Dwarf cuckoo	Coccycua pumila	unknown	LC	Steady		
Pearly-breasted cuckoo	Coccyzus euleri	unknown	LC	▼		
Grey-capped cuckoo	Coccyzus lansbergi	unknown	LC	▼		
Hispaniolan lizard-cuckoo	Coccyzus longirostris	unknown	LC	▼		
Dark-billed cuckoo	Coccyzus melacoryphus	unknown	LC	▼		
Cuban lizard-cuckoo (Great lizard cuckoo)	Coccyzus merlini	unknown	LC	▼		
Chestnut-bellied cuckoo	Coccyzus pluvialis	unknown	LC	Steady		
Jamaican lizard-cuckoo	Coccyzus vetula	unknown	LC	Steady		
Blue coua	Coua caerulea	unknown	LC	▼		
Coquerel's coua	Coua coquereli	unknown	LC	▼		
Crested coua	Coua cristata	unknown	LC	▼		
Running coua	Coua cursor	unknown	LC	▼		
Olive-capped coua	Coua olivaceiceps	unknown	LC	▼		
Red-fronted coua	Coua reynaudii	unknown	LC	▼		
Red-capped coua	Coua ruficeps	unknown	LC	Steady		
Red-breasted coua	Coua serriana	unknown	LC	▼		
Verreaux's coua	Coua verreauxi	unknown	LC	▼		
Scale-feathered malkoha	Dasylophus cumingi	unknown	LC	▼	IUCN/BirdLife International place species in genus Lepidogrammus.	
Red-crested malkoha (Rough-crested malkoha)	Dasylophus superciliosus	unknown	LC	▼		
Pavonine cuckoo	Dromococcyx pavoninus	unknown	LC	▼		
Eastern koel (Pacific koel)	Eudynamys orientalis	unknown	LC	▼	Note that IOC taxonomy splits an additional species, the black-billed koel, from this species. IUCN/BirdLife International maintain both within E. orientalis.	
Western koel (Asian koel)	Eudynamys scolopaceus	unknown	LC	Steady		
Guira cuckoo	Guira guira	unknown	LC	▲		
Red-billed ground-cuckoo	Neomorphus pucheranii	unknown	LC	▼		
Rufous-winged ground-cuckoo	Neomorphus rufipennis	unknown	LC	▼		
Dwarf koel	Microdynamis parva	unknown	LC	▼		
Thick-billed cuckoo	Pachycoccyx audeberti	unknown	LC	▼		
Chestnut-breasted malkoha	Phaenicophaeus curvirostris	unknown	LC	▼		
Mentawai malkoha	Phaenicophaeus oeneicaudus	unknown	LC	Steady		
Green-billed malkoha	Phaenicophaeus tristis	unknown	LC	Steady		
Blue-faced malkoha	Phaenicophaeus viridirostris	unknown	LC	▼		
Common squirrel-cuckoo	Piaya cayana	unknown	LC	▼	The global population has not been quantified due to recent taxonomic splits. Note that IOC taxonomy maintains this species as a single species with P. mexicana.	
Mexican squirrel-cuckoo	Piaya mexicana	unknown	LC	▼	The global population has not been quantified due to recent taxonomic splits. Note that IOC taxonomy maintains this species as a single species with P. cayana.	
Black-bellied cuckoo	Piaya melanogaster	unknown	LC	▼		
Yellow-billed malkoha	Rhamphococcyx calyorhynchus	unknown	LC	▼		
Raffles's malkoha	Rhinortha chlorophaea	unknown	LC	▼		
Channel-billed cuckoo	Scythrops novaehollandiae	unknown	LC	▼		
Sirkeer malkoha	Taccocua leschenaultii	unknown	LC	▼		
Long-tailed koel	Urodynamis taitensis	unknown	LC	▼		
Red-billed malkoha	Zanclostomus javanicus	unknown	LC	▼		

== See also ==
- Lists of birds by population
- Lists of organisms by population
