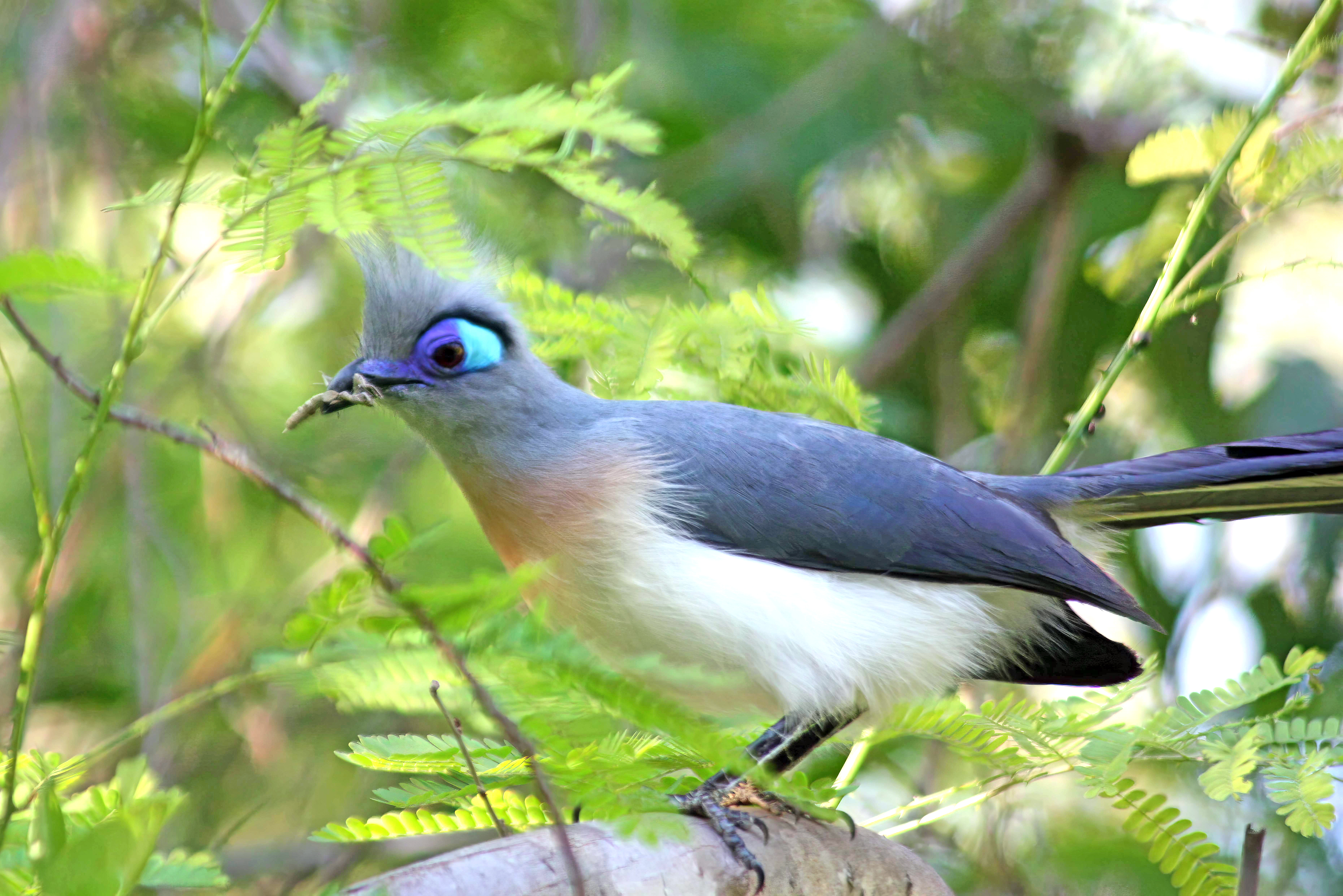
- At Anjajavy Forest, Madagascar

Conservation status
- Least Concern (IUCN 3.1)

Scientific classification
- Kingdom: Animalia
- Phylum: Chordata
- Class: Aves
- Order: Cuculiformes
- Family: Cuculidae
- Genus: Coua
- Species: C. cristata

Binomial name
- Coua cristata (Linnaeus, 1766)

Synonyms
- Cuculus cristatus Linnaeus, 1766

= Crested coua =

Species of bird

The crested coua (Coua cristata) is a common medium-sized bird member of the cuckoo family, Cuculidae. It is endemic to Madagascar, mainly found in the coastal regions of the island. The crested coua is a weak flyer, so it will often be observed hopping from branch to branch in high canopies. It is distinguished mainly by its greenish-grey back, its prominent grey head crest, rufous-coloured breast, white abdomen and bright turquoise and blue patches of bare skin around the eyes.

== Description ==
=== Adults ===
The adult crested coua is a medium-sized bird, averaging between 12 and 17 inches (30 to 44 cm) in length. It has a greenish-gray plumage on the back, a white abdomen, rufous-colored chest and brown eyes. Its long tail is purplish-blue with white tips and its bill and beak are black. Its defining characteristics are its prominent grey head crest and, as goes for all couas, its colourful patches of bare skin around the eyes, which is blue and turquoise in crested couas. In flight, it is recognizable from its short rounded wings and long white-tipped tail.

Furthermore, this bird's third toe is reversible, which helps it have a strong grip when hopping around high branches in the canopy. Although they are common birds in their range, they can be hard to see in the wild since their greenish-gray coloration tends to blend with shadows and act as camouflage. Males and females are similar physically.

=== Juveniles ===
Juveniles are comparable to adult crested couas however, they are paler in colour, have a shorter head crest and do not have the characteristic bright blue and turquoise ring around the eye.

=== Chicks ===
Young chicks are altricial, which means they are naked at birth and need full parental attention for their early development. During that time, they have unique red and white "bullseyes" inside their mouth, supposedly used to indicate to their parents where to put the food. This characteristic is thought to be particularly useful at darker hours of the day. They also have a dark skin and a reddish bill at that stage.

== Taxonomy ==
The crested coua is one of nine living bird species in the subfamily Couinae, which only has one genus, the Coua. These birds are part of the order Cuculiformes, which includes Cuckoos and Roadrunners. Couas are a monophyletic group of endemic birds of Madagascar.

Three of the coua species are arboreal (Blue Coua (C. caerulea), Crested Coua (C. cristata) and Verreaux's Coua (C. verreauxi)), and six species are ground dwelling (Coquerel's Coua (C. coquereli), Running Coua (C. cursor), Giant Coua (C. gigas), Red-fronted Coua (C. reynaudii), Red-capped Coua (C. ruficeps) and Red-breasted Coua (C. serriana)).

=== Subspecies ===
The crested coua has four subspecies:

- Coua cristata cristata
- Coua cristata dumonti
- Coua cristata pyropyga
- Coua cristata maxima

== Distribution and habitat ==
Crested couas are endemic to Madagascar and are the most widespread of all couas. Although their population numbers are unknown, their range is thought to be 562,000 km^{2} along the coast of the island. They are found at altitudes as high as 900m above sea level, but are most commonly seen around altitudes of 700m.

Despite being mostly found in littoral and deciduous forests, their habitats also consist open areas like savannas and brushlands. They will occasionally be found in mangroves and palms as well. Additionally, they usually avoid deciduous shrublands, selecting mainly for mosaics of forests and croplands. As arboreal species, they tend to use forest layers above five meters and they nest, on average, around nine meters from the ground.

== Threats ==
Although this species is marked as least concerned due to their stable populations, crested coua's numbers are believed to be declining due to habitat loss, degradation and hunting pressures.

It is mostly hunted by humans for meat, but its main natural predators are fossas, hawks and eagles.

== Behaviour ==
Despite being capable of flight, crested couas are weak flyers, and often bounce continuously between branches in tree canopies. Keeping balance with their long tail and grasping branches with their reversible toe, they are able to move with speed and agility. Secretive, they tend to stay in groups of three to five individuals outside of breeding season. They do not tend to flock, although they sometimes join mixed-species flocks.

=== Vocalization ===
They are highly vocal birds and have several different calls that we can hear in the wild. The most commons are "laser gun calls", which are a series of piercing sounds, and doubled, wooden "touk-touk" sounds. It is also possible to hear calls such as "koa-koa-koa" and "guay-guay-guay-guay-gwuck". Its call can sometimes serve as an indicator of predator presence in the environment.

Couas, like many birds, tend to be more vocal around sunset, often creating mixed chorus with other species. They also raise their head crest while calling.

=== Reproduction ===
Breeding crested couas are usually found in monogamous pairs. Unlike some other species of cuckoos, these birds do not take part in brood parasitism, but rather, both male and female co-parent the chicks. The pair builds their nest themselves out of twigs and hide it in trees or bushes to avoid detection by predators. Two single white eggs are laid and incubated by both parents. The chicks are born altricial with both parents equally helping in raising the young until they are about two weeks old, when they leave the nest. Couas have low fecundity, but they have a high adult longevity (up to 15 years in captivity), which is why they can afford to have a smaller brood size. Additionally, because of their short young-rearing period, it is possible for them to have several clutches in one breeding season, which is from September to March.

=== Diet ===
They have an omnivorous diet consisting of arthropods, fruits, berries, snails, chameleons, leaves, seeds and others. They essentially feed on everything size appropriate that they find in their environment.

== Gallery ==
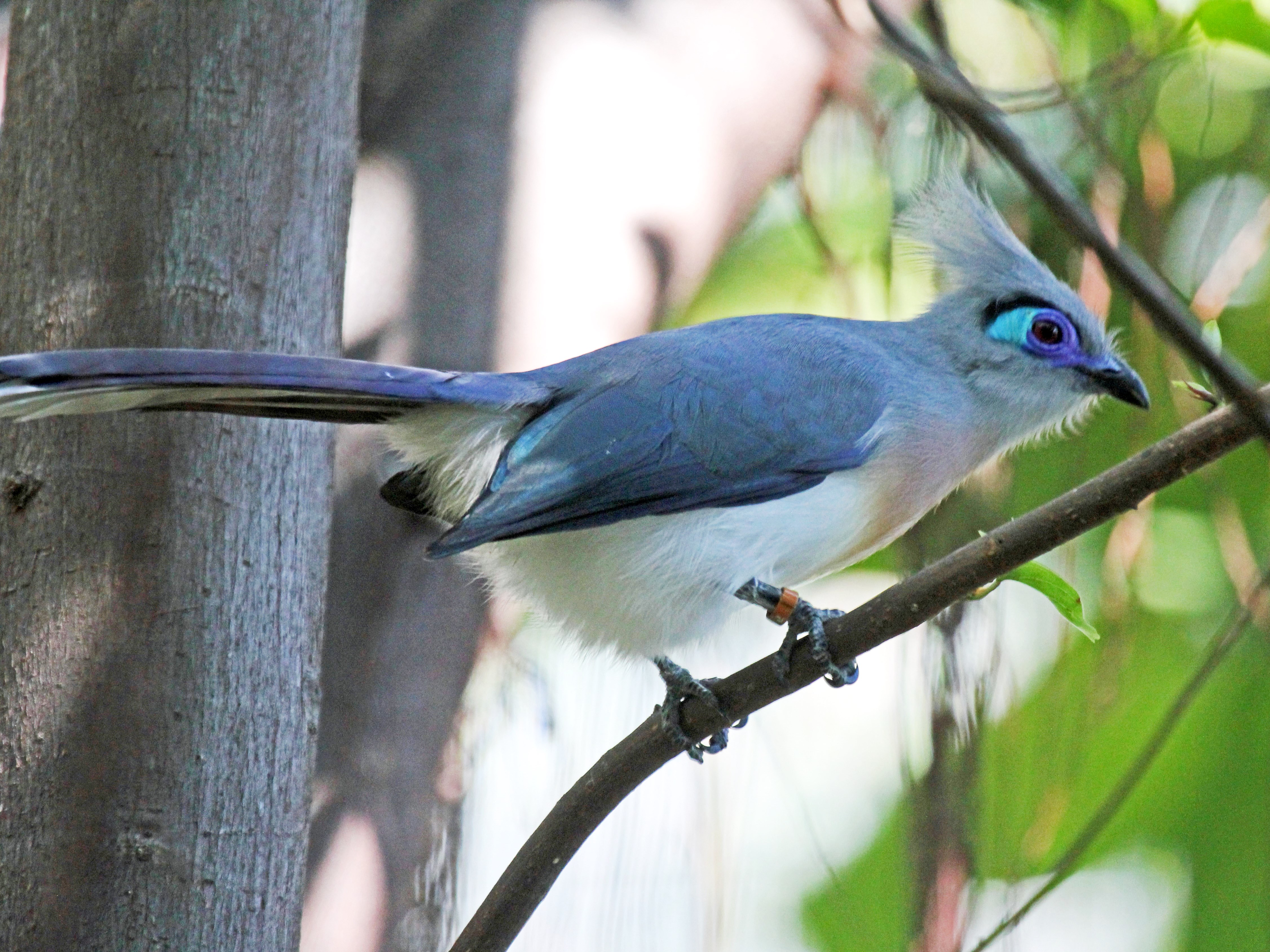
At San Diego Zoo

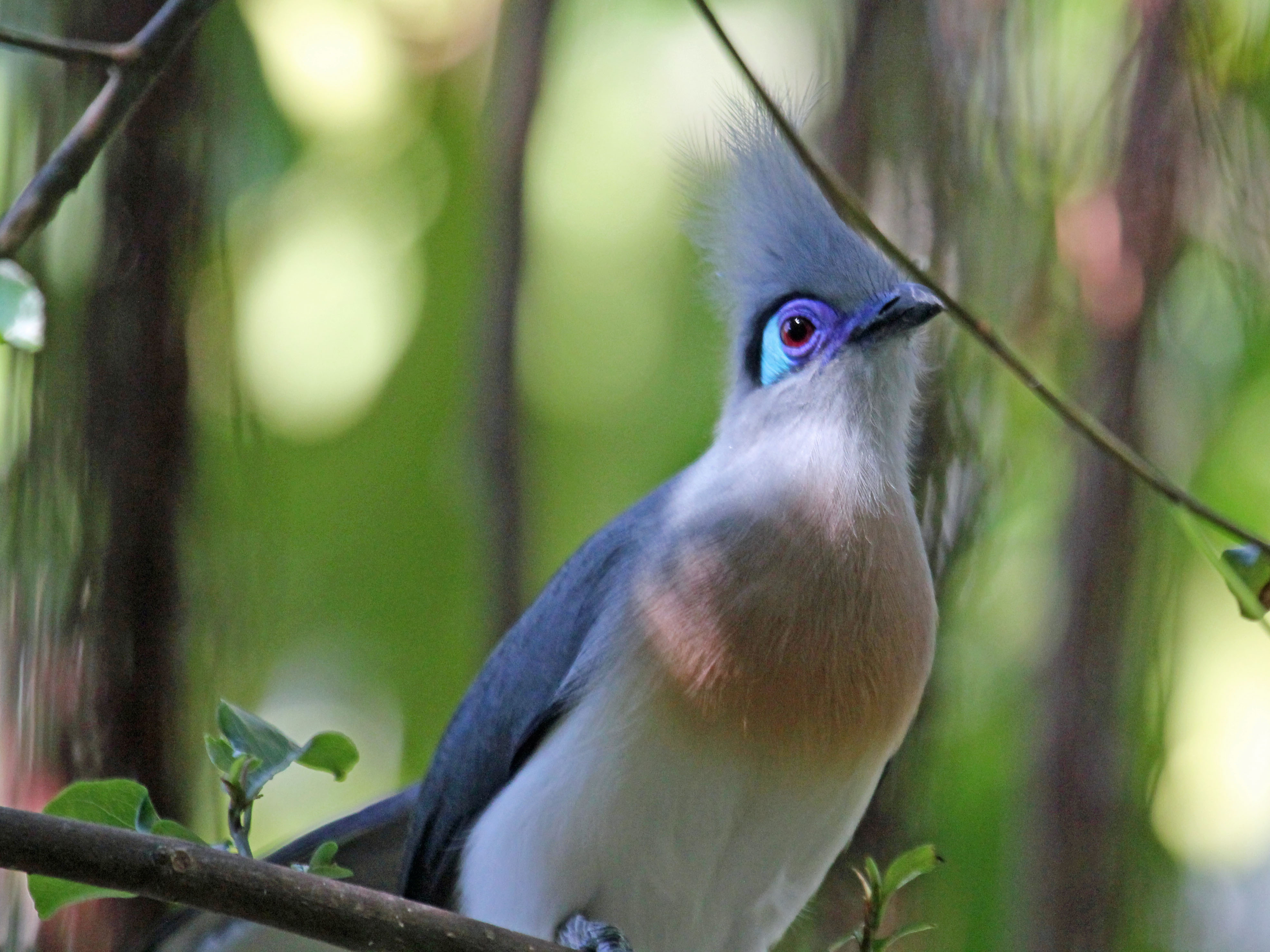
At San Diego Zoo

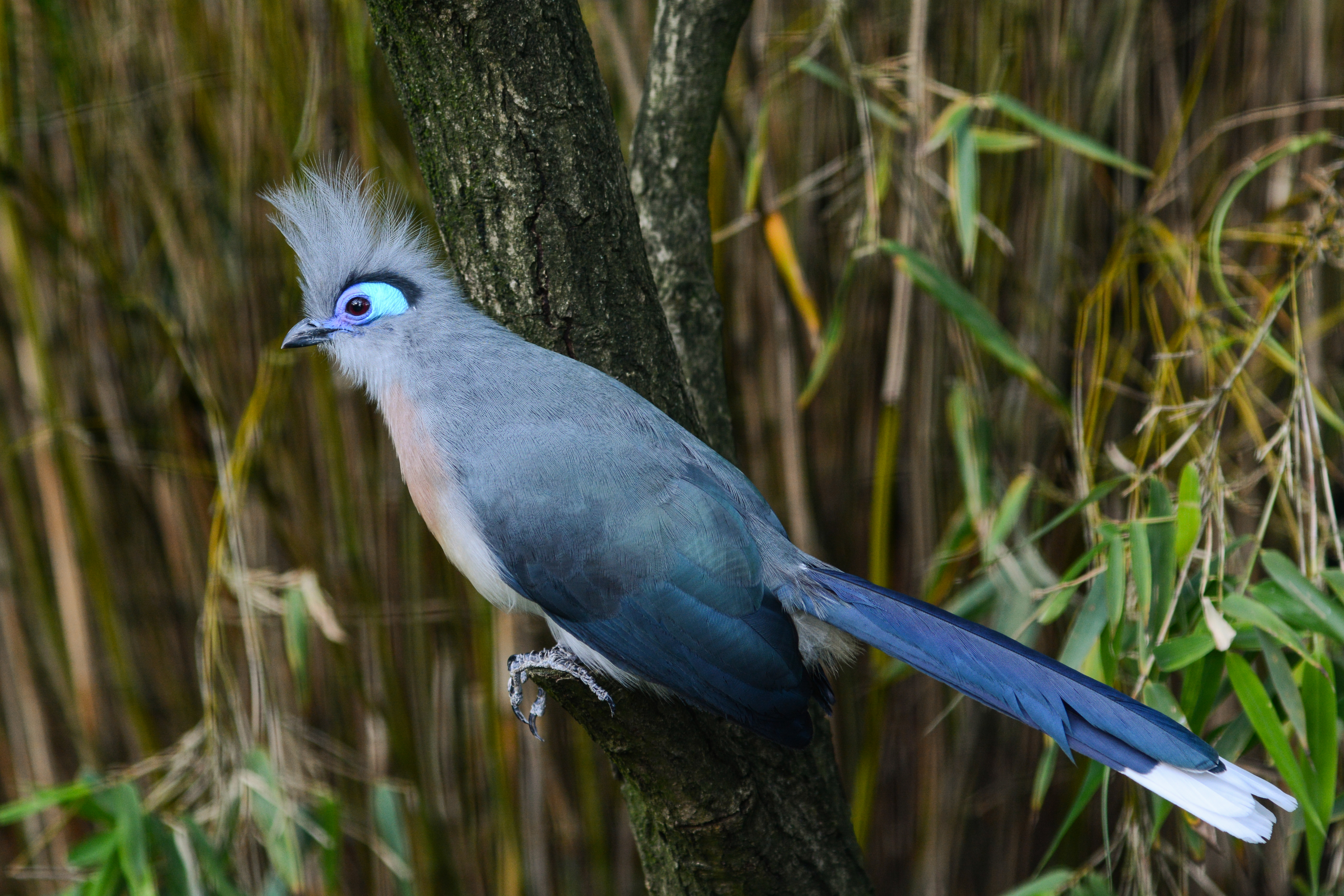
At Weltvogelpark Walsrode, Germany
