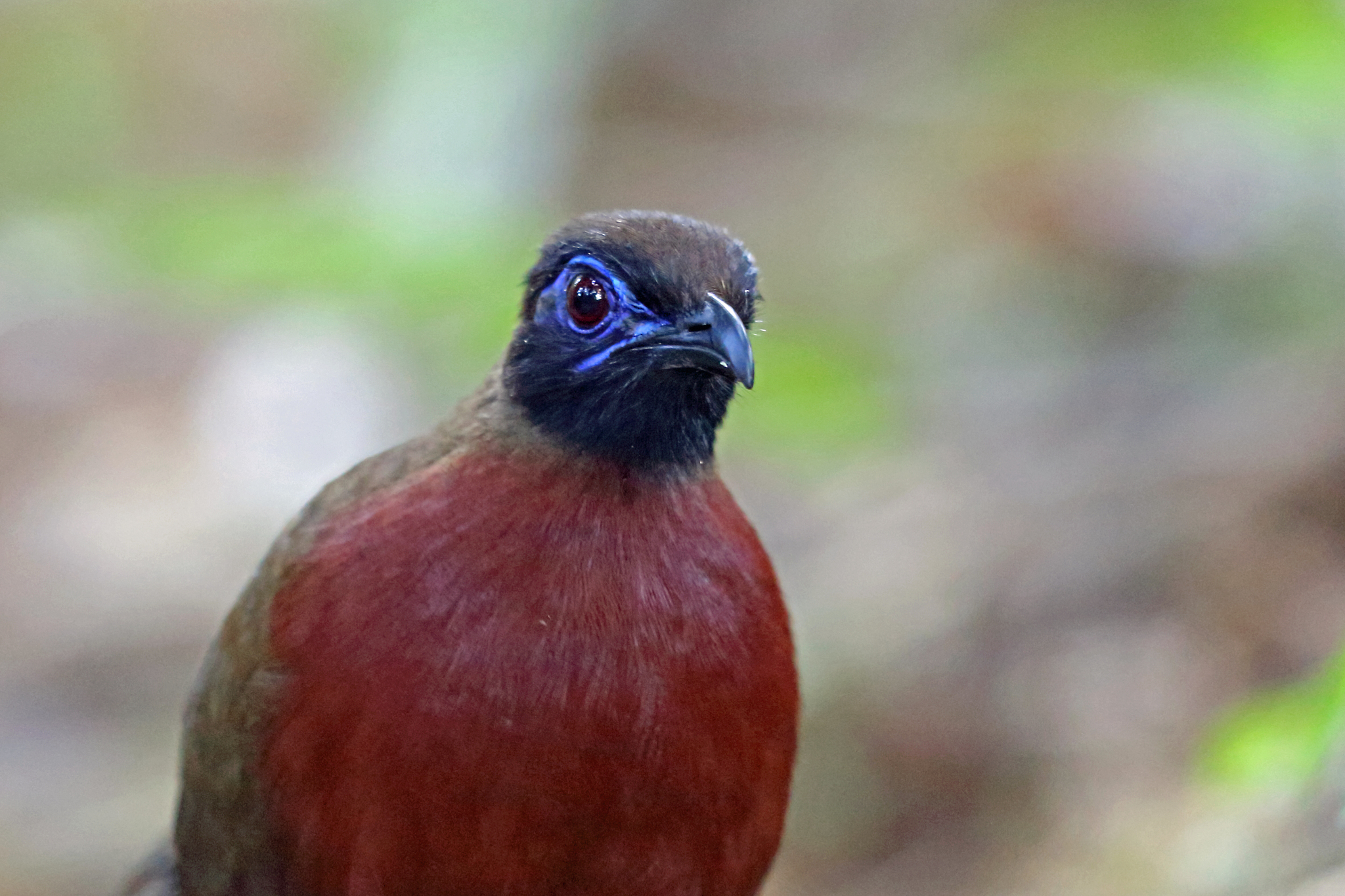

Conservation status
- Least Concern (IUCN 3.1)

Scientific classification
- Kingdom: Animalia
- Phylum: Chordata
- Class: Aves
- Order: Cuculiformes
- Family: Cuculidae
- Genus: Coua
- Species: C. serriana

Binomial name
- Coua serriana Pucheran, 1845

= Red-breasted coua =

Species of bird

The red-breasted coua (Coua serriana) is a species of cuckoo in the family Cuculidae. Unlike many birds in this family, couas do not exhibit brood parasitism. The species is endemic to northeastern Madagascar, where the tropical rainforest provides an ideal habitat to support the bird's needs. The red-breasted coua is a lowland specialist, and thus threatened by the conversion of forest into agricultural fields. It is an understudied species, despite it being quite abundant and vocal.

The bird's loud and repetitive vocalizations represent one of the best ways to distinguish it from other couas. Additionally, the bird has a characteristic red breast, as well as bicoloured blue, bare skin around its eyes. Juveniles are much duller in colour, though they have buff-coloured spots on their upperparts.

== Description ==
In the field, red-breasted couas are generally distinguished from other couas by from their stocky shape. With a length of 42 cm, a weight of 298 g and an average wingspan of 164 cm, the red-breasted coua is average-sized compared to its counterparts.

Males and females show no sexual dimorphism. Adults have dark, green-brown upperparts (head, upper back, and wings), with the crown representing the darkest feature of the bird. The underparts are dark olive-brown to blackish-brown, with the exception of the breast, which is a deep brownish-red or rusty colour. The tail is long and glossy blue-black in colour. The red-breasted coua's eyes are surrounded by bicoloured sky blue and ultramarine blue, bare skin. The iris can be red or brown, the bill is black, and the legs and feet are dark grey.

The red-breasted coua's primaries increase in length from the innermost feather to the fourth one. Primaries four to seven are equal in length, and the longest, while eight to ten are the shortest, decreasing in length as they move outwards.

Juveniles have dark bronze upperparts with pale, yellowish spots (excluding the head, which is fully dark brown). The wing coverts and the primary and secondary feathers possess a paler edge, either rusty or buff in colour. The tail is completely black, having not yet developed its blue glow. The breast is a dull chestnut colour while the belly is olive. The skin around the eye is usually feathered and the bill is paler, with a darker tip.

== Taxonomy ==
Coua serriana was formally described by Jacques Pucheran in 1845 in the scientific journal Revue zoologique par la société Cuvérienne. The genus name, Coua, stems from Koa, the traditional Malagasy expression for couas, derived from the birds vocalizations. The species name, serriana, is named after the geologist and naturalist Pierre Marcel Toussainte de Serrès.

The red-breasted coua is part of Order Cuculiformes, sister taxon to Order Musiphagiformes. The Cuculiformes contains two families: Cuculidae (cuckoos, roadrunners, couas, etc.) and Opisthocomidae (hoatzin). Six subfamilies within the Cuculidae were originally identified by ornithologist James Lee Peters in 1940: Cuculinae, Phaenicophaeinae, Crotophaginae, Neomorphinae, Centropodinae, and Couinae. Peters based his classifications on geographical distribution and the presence or absence of brood parasitism. Couas were grouped in the Couinae subfamily because of their endemism to the island of Madagascar.

In 1997, ornithologist Robert B. Payne placed couas in the Phaenicophaeinae subfamily based on DNA-DNA hybridization studies, before reinstating them as part of the Couinae subfamily in 2005 after in-depth mitochondrial DNA analyses. It is in this same 2005 study that he also grouped the Cuculinae and Phaenicophaenae into one subfamily, for a total of 5 subfamilies within the Cuculidae. There is an ongoing debate as to whether there are five or six subfamilies within the Cuculidae family.

Couas are a monophyletic group, as evidenced by mitochondrial DNA analyses. Within the Coua genus, species are split into arboreal or terrestrial species, with the red-breasted coua being in the latter group. Uncertainty remains as to the sister taxa of the species. While some mitochondrial DNA analyses find that the species is most closely related to Coua cursor (the running coua), other studies who have conducted the same analyses find that its sister taxa would either be Coua gigas (Giant coua) or Coua delalandei (Delalande's coua). Coua serriata is a monotypic species.

== Habitat and Distribution ==
The red-breasted coua is endemic, and a year-round resident, to the evergreen Malagasy humid forest in northeastern Madagascar. It is most abundant in the untouched Masoala rainforest, which is mostly unreachable by humans. It's distribution spans from Zahamena National Park, north to the city of Sambava. It has also been observed in the north-western region of Sambirano.

The bird is a low-altitude specialist, always found in the lowest possible elevation range of a given region. It is terrestrial and prioritizes undisturbed and open microhabitats in the forest understory. The Masoala forests are low in altitude, and therefore perfect for the lowland species.

== Behaviour ==
Red-breasted couas are secretive and shy despite their loud vocalizations. They are ground-dwelling birds, and can be found alone, in pairs or in groups. They rarely use flight to move around. In fact, when threatened, they run in a horizontal position until they find a place to hide. The bird also takes advantages of sunny, open areas to warm up or dry itself while standing with drooped wings and a fanned out tail.

=== Vocalizations ===
The red-breasted coua is a very vocal species, often being heard before being observed. It possesses several different types of vocalizations. First, the song from which it bears its name is a repeated and loud Koo-ah composed of three notes. Second, its call is a song-likeTee oooo. Finally, it is also known to grunt on occasion.

The red-breasted coua has a similar song to the red-fronted coua (Coua reynaudii), though the latter's Koo-ah decreases in volume while the former's stays at a constant volume throughout.

=== Diet ===
Brood parasitism can be linked to a specialist diet, as species who do not have the obligation of parental care can invest more energy into searching for more specific foods. Couas do not exhibit brood parasitism, as many cuckoos do, and therefore tend do be generalist feeders. The red-breasted coua lies in the middle of the specialist-generalist spectrum, having a more specialized diet than most couas, but a more generalist diet than most other cuckoos.

Red-breasted couas mainly feed on berries and fruits, though they are also known to eat seeds and insects (beetles and flies). One observation of fledgling being fed a small lizard by its parent has also been recorded, suggesting a potentially more diverse diet than previously described.

Their foraging strategy is intrinsically related to their ground-dwelling behaviour. They very rarely fly, preferring to walk or run on the ground or on a fallen logs. They also often take advantage of fallen fruits left behind by flocks of flying frugivorous birds by positioning themselves underneath the flock.

=== Reproduction ===
Very little is known about the red-breasted coua's reproduction behaviours. Unlike many birds of the Cuculiformes, couas are not brood parasites. Breeding season occurs in December. A nest is built out of twigs in an epiphytic fern or a palm tree, approximately 2-4 meters off the ground. The bird has a clutch size of 2 eggs, which are white in colour. A singular observation of an adult feeding a fledgling suggests parental care behaviour within the species.

Other terrestrial couas have been studied in more detail (Coua ruficeps, Coua coquereli, Coua gigas), and were found to be monogamous pairs throughout their lifetime. Both adults work together to build the nest and raise their chicks. The young leave the nest early, but they continue to be fed until they can fly. Their slow reproductive rate is compensated by their longevity and high survival rate. These species are closely related to the red-breasted coua, suggesting that this species may also exhibit these traits.

== Conservation Status ==
The red-breasted coua is classified as least concern on the IUCN Red List. However, it remains susceptible to habitat loss due to its very narrow distribution range. Lowland specialists like the red-breasted coua are especially vulnerable to human activity because these low-altitude regions of the Malagasy rainforest are the first to be transformed into agricultural fields. Habitat destruction therefore represents one of the main threats to the species.

Feral cats represent another important threat to the species, who tends to avoid areas where these felines are present.

Couas are also threatened by local hunters who set out traps with bait to attract the birds, although this remains an understudied issue.
