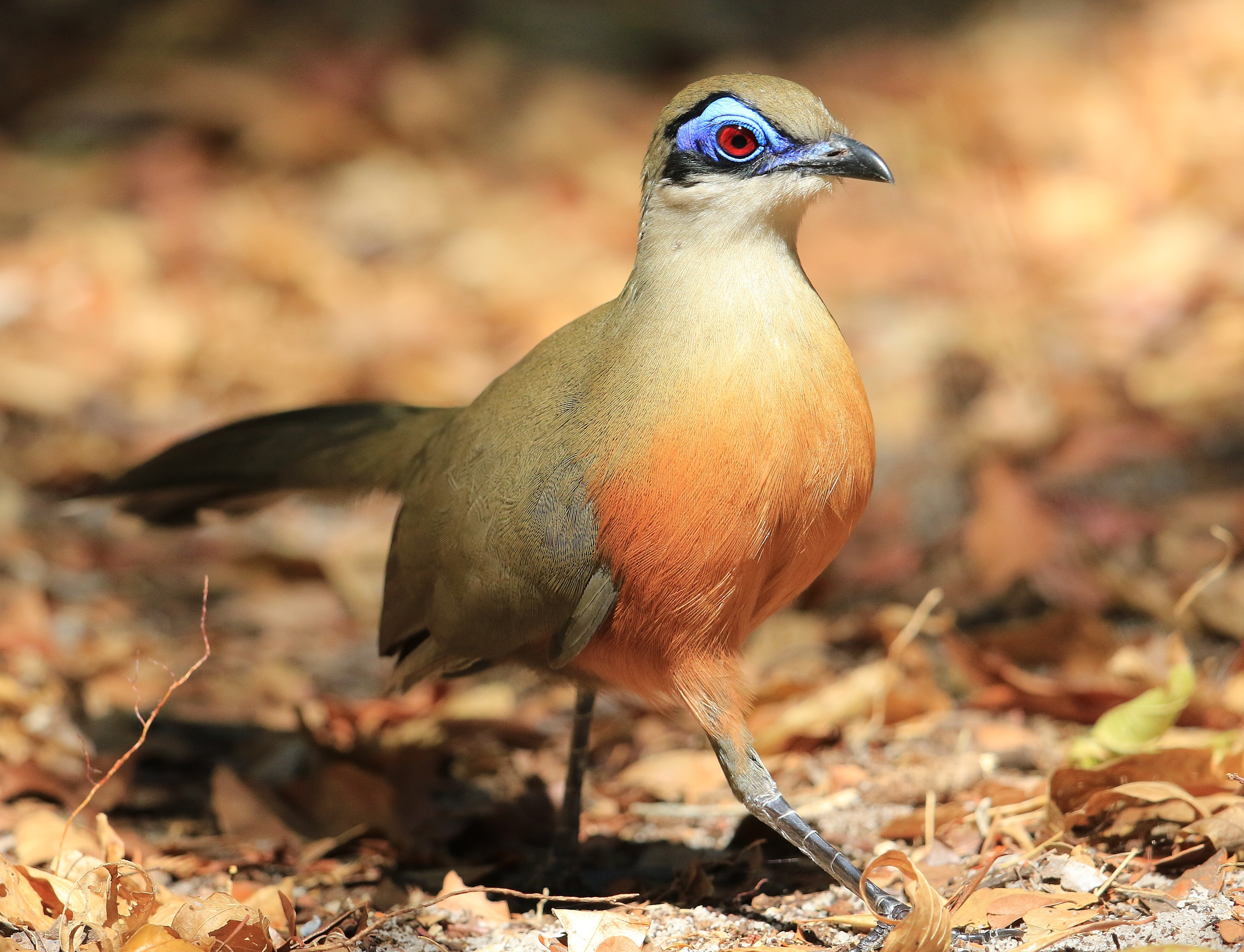
- Coquerel's coua (Coua coquereli)

Scientific classification
- Kingdom: Animalia
- Phylum: Chordata
- Class: Aves
- Order: Cuculiformes
- Family: Cuculidae
- Genus: Coua; Schinz, 1821

Type species
- Cuculus madagascariensis Gmelin, 1788

Species
- See text
- range of genus

= Coua =

Couas

Genus of birds

Couas are large, mostly terrestrial birds of the cuckoo family, endemic to the island of Madagascar.

Couas are reminiscent of African turacos when walking along tree branches, and they likewise feature brightly coloured, bare skin around the eyes. Some resemble coucals in their habit of clambering through jungle while foraging, while the arboreal species move between tree canopies with gliding flight. Four species have been recorded in rainforests, while the remaining six are found in the dry forests of western and southern Madagascar.

They have large feet, with a reversible third toe like all cuckoos. Their long tibiae suggest a relationship with the Carpococcyx ground-cuckoos of Asia, a genus with similar nestlings. Consequently, they are sometimes united in the subfamily Couinae. Couas build their own nests and lay white eggs. Couas' calls are a short series of evenly spaced notes, which are sometimes answered by other individuals.

== Taxonomy ==
The genus Coua was erected by Swiss naturalist Heinrich Rudolf Schinz in 1821, with Cuculus madagascariensis (a synonym of Cuculus gigas) as the type species. The name is from koa, the Malagasy word for the couas.

=== Species ===
The 10 extant species placed in the genus Coua are:

Image	Scientific name	Common name	Distribution
	C. cursor	Running coua	Madagascar
	C. gigas	Giant coua	western and southern Madagascar
	C. coquereli	Coquerel's coua	Madagascar
	C. serriana	Red-breasted coua	Madagascar
	C. reynaudii	Red-fronted coua	Madagascar
	C. ruficeps	Red-capped coua	Madagascar
	C. olivaceiceps	Olive-capped coua	Madagascar
	C. cristata	Crested coua	Madagascar
	C. verreauxi	Verreaux's coua	Madagascar
	C. caerulea	Blue coua	Madagascar

=== Fossils and extinct species ===
- Ancient coua, C. primaeva – prehistoric
- Bertha's coua, C. berthae – only known from Holocene fossil remains
- Delalande's coua or the snail-eating coua, C. delalandei – extinct (late 19th century)
