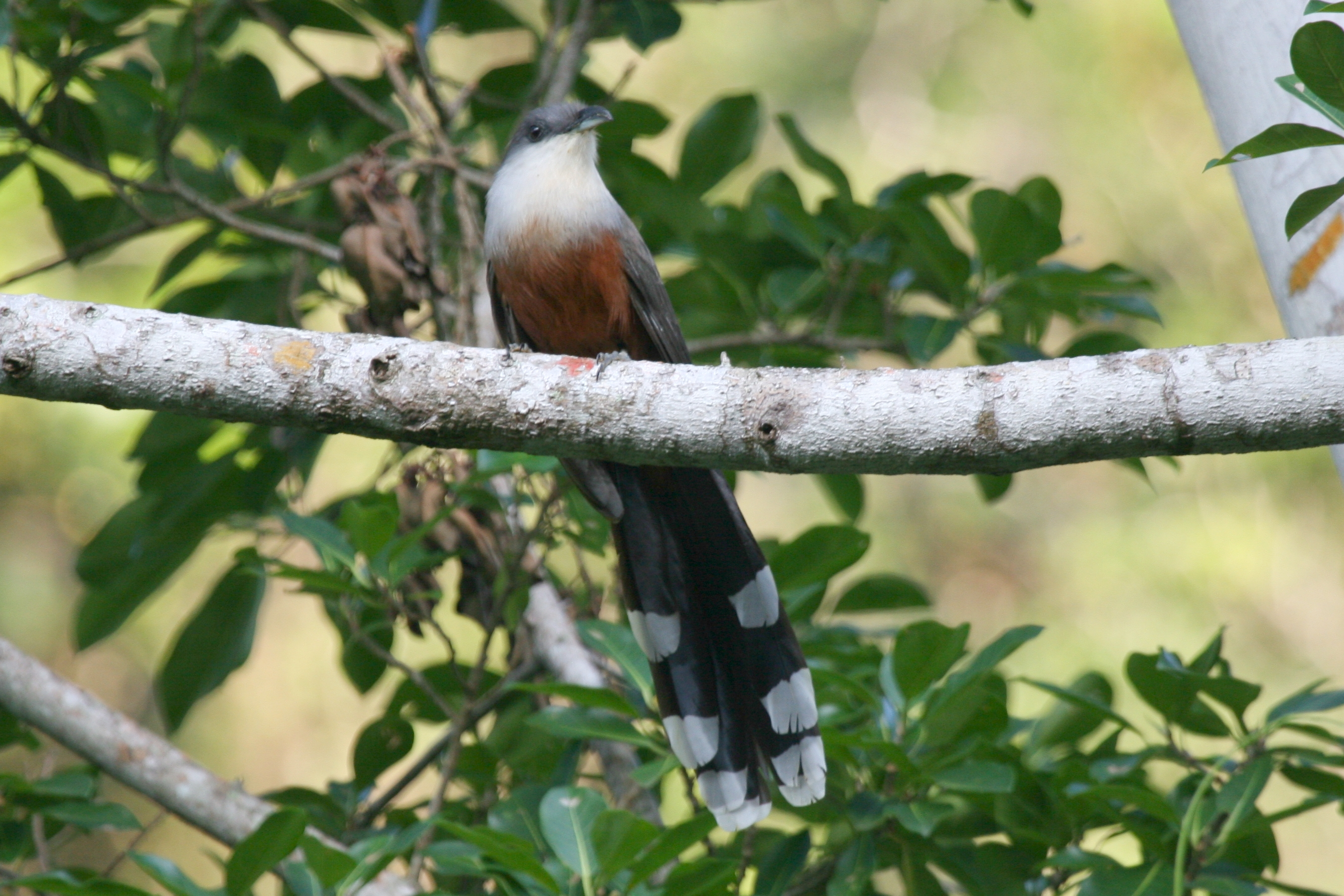

Conservation status
- Least Concern (IUCN 3.1)

Scientific classification
- Kingdom: Animalia
- Phylum: Chordata
- Class: Aves
- Order: Cuculiformes
- Family: Cuculidae
- Genus: Coccyzus
- Species: C. pluvialis

Binomial name
- Coccyzus pluvialis (Gmelin, JF, 1788)

Synonyms
- Hyetornis pluvialis

= Chestnut-bellied cuckoo =

Species of bird

The chestnut-bellied cuckoo (Coccyzus pluvialis) is a species of bird in the tribe Phaenicophaeini, subfamily Cuculinae of the cuckoo family Cuculidae. It is endemic to Jamaica.

== Taxonomy and systematics ==
The chestnut-bellied cuckoo was formally described in 1788 by the German naturalist Johann Friedrich Gmelin in his revised and expanded edition of Carl Linnaeus's Systema Naturae. He placed it with all the other cuckoos in the genus Cuculus and coined the binomial name Cuculus pluvialis. Gmelin based his account on those of earlier authors include that of the Irish physician, naturalist and collector Hans Sloane. Between 1687 and 1689 Sloane lived in Jamaica. In the account of his stay, which was not published until 1725, he described the chestnut-bellied cuckoo under the names "Old-Man" and "Raine-bird" and explained that "It makes a noise generally before rain, whence it had its name of Rain Bird". The chestnut-bellied cuckoo is now placed with 12 other species in the genus Coccyzus that was introduced in 1816 by the French ornithologist Louis Pierre Vieillot. The genus name is from the Ancient Greek kokkuzō meaning "to cry cuckoo". The specific epithet pluvialis is Latin meaning "relating to rain".

The chestnut-bellied cuckoo was at one time placed in genus Piaya which was later merged into genus Hyetornis. That genus was in turn merged into the current Coccyzus. The species is monotypic.

== Description ==
The chestnut-bellied cuckoo is 48 to 56 cm (19 to 22 in) long, about half of which is the tail, and weighs 130 to 189 g (4.6 to 6.7 oz). The species' blackish bill is stout and decurved. Males and females have the same plumage. Adults have dull brown upperparts, a light gray face and breast with a paler throat, and a dark rufous belly. Their tail is black with large white tips and a purple gloss. Juveniles have a dark brown tail with white tips but no gloss.

== Distribution and habitat ==
The chestnut-bellied cuckoo is found throughout most of Jamaica. It inhabits mature evergreen forest, secondary forest, thickets and brushy areas, and semi-open woodlands. In elevation it ranges from sea level to above 1,500 m (4,900 ft).

== Behavior ==
=== Movement ===
The chestnut-bellied cuckoo moves to the lower elevations of its range during winter.

=== Feeding ===
The chestnut-bellied cuckoo has a varied diet that includes adult insects, caterpillars, lizards, nestling birds, and eggs. It forages mostly from the forest mid-story to the canopy, running along branches and gliding from tree to tree. It usually forages alone.

=== Breeding ===
The chestnut-bellied cuckoo's breeding season is usually between March and June but may start in February. It makes a shallow twig nest in a tree at up to 10 m (30 ft) above the ground. The clutch size is two to four eggs; the incubation period and time to fledging are not known.

=== Vocalization ===
The chestnut-bellied cuckoo's principal vocalization is a "[h]oarse 'quak-quak-ak-ak-ak-ak', slow, then accelerating towards [the] end."

== Status ==
The IUCN has assessed the chestnut-bellied cuckoo as being of Least Concern. It has a large range, and though its population size is not known it is believed to be stable. No immediate threats have been identified. It is considered uncommon and not well known, and "further research and a proper survey of this species' population and status are needed."
