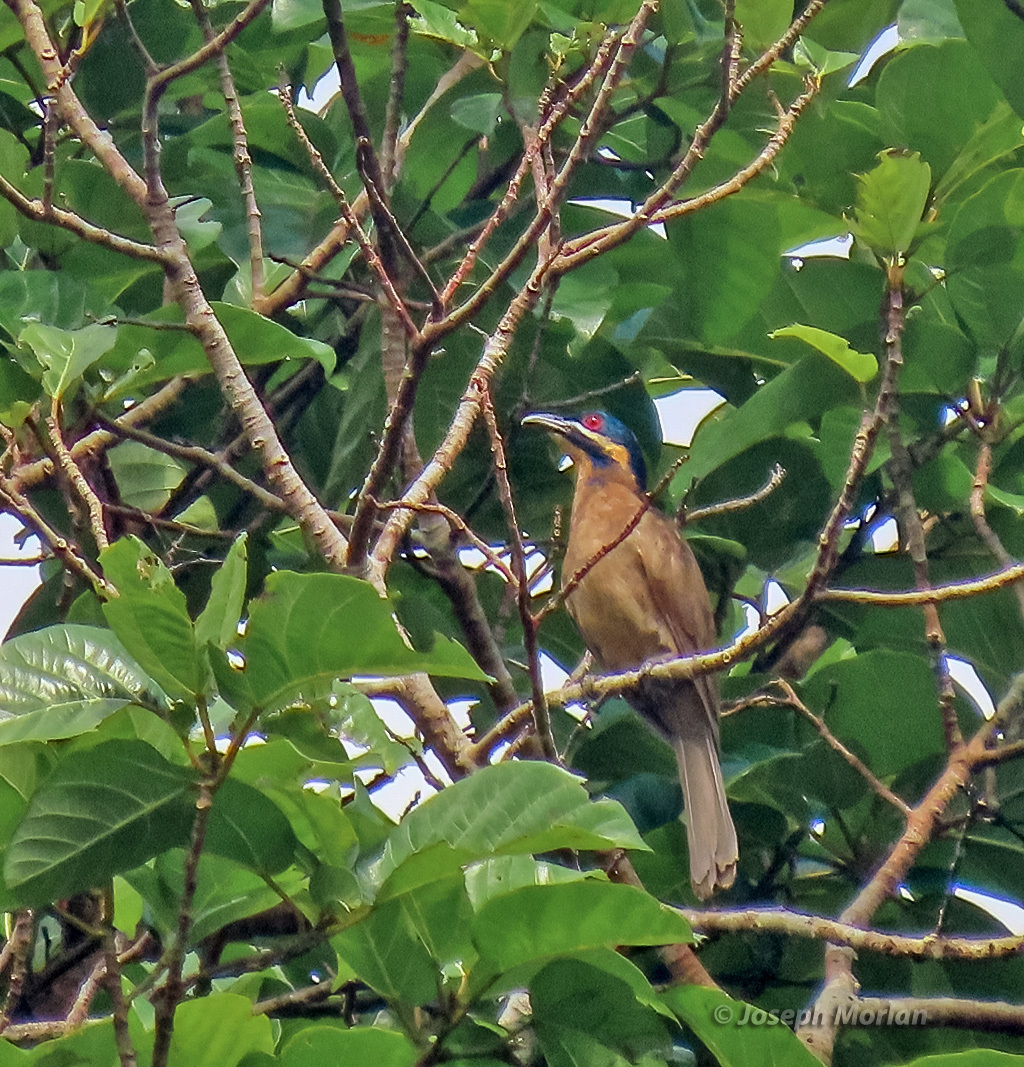

Conservation status
- Least Concern (IUCN 3.1)

Scientific classification
- Kingdom: Animalia
- Phylum: Chordata
- Class: Aves
- Order: Cuculiformes
- Family: Cuculidae
- Genus: Microdynamis; Salvadori, 1878
- Species: M. parva

Binomial name
- Microdynamis parva (Salvadori, 1876)

= Dwarf koel =

Species of bird

The dwarf koel (Microdynamis parva) is a species of cuckoo in the family Cuculidae. It is monotypic within the genus Microdynamis. It is found in New Guinea, where its natural habitat is subtropical or tropical moist lowland forests. Its closest relatives are the Eudynamys (the true koels).
