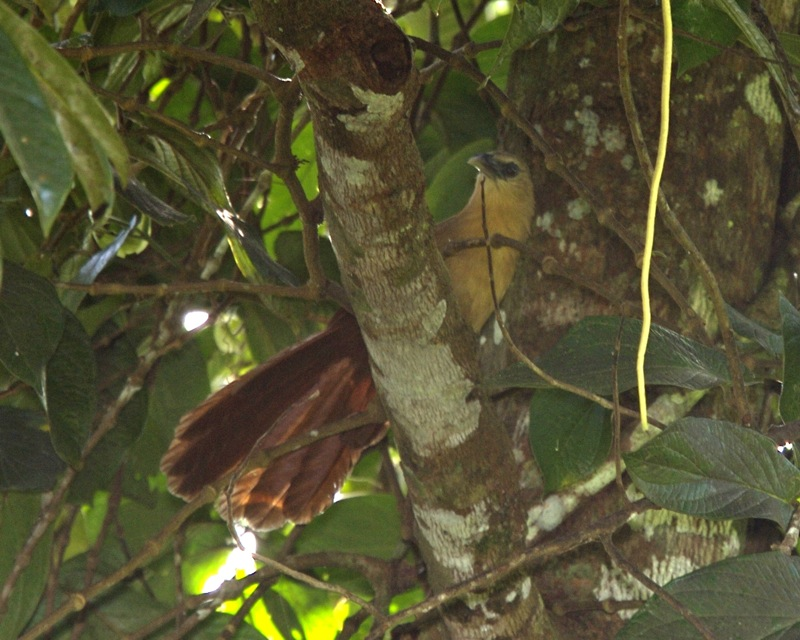

Conservation status
- Least Concern (IUCN 3.1)

Scientific classification
- Kingdom: Animalia
- Phylum: Chordata
- Class: Aves
- Order: Cuculiformes
- Family: Cuculidae
- Genus: Centropus
- Species: C. celebensis

Binomial name
- Centropus celebensis Quoy & Gaimard, 1832

= Bay coucal =

Species of bird

The bay coucal (Centropus celebensis) is a species of cuckoo in the family Cuculidae. It is endemic to Indonesia.

Its natural habitats are subtropical or tropical moist lowland forest and subtropical or tropical moist montane forest.
