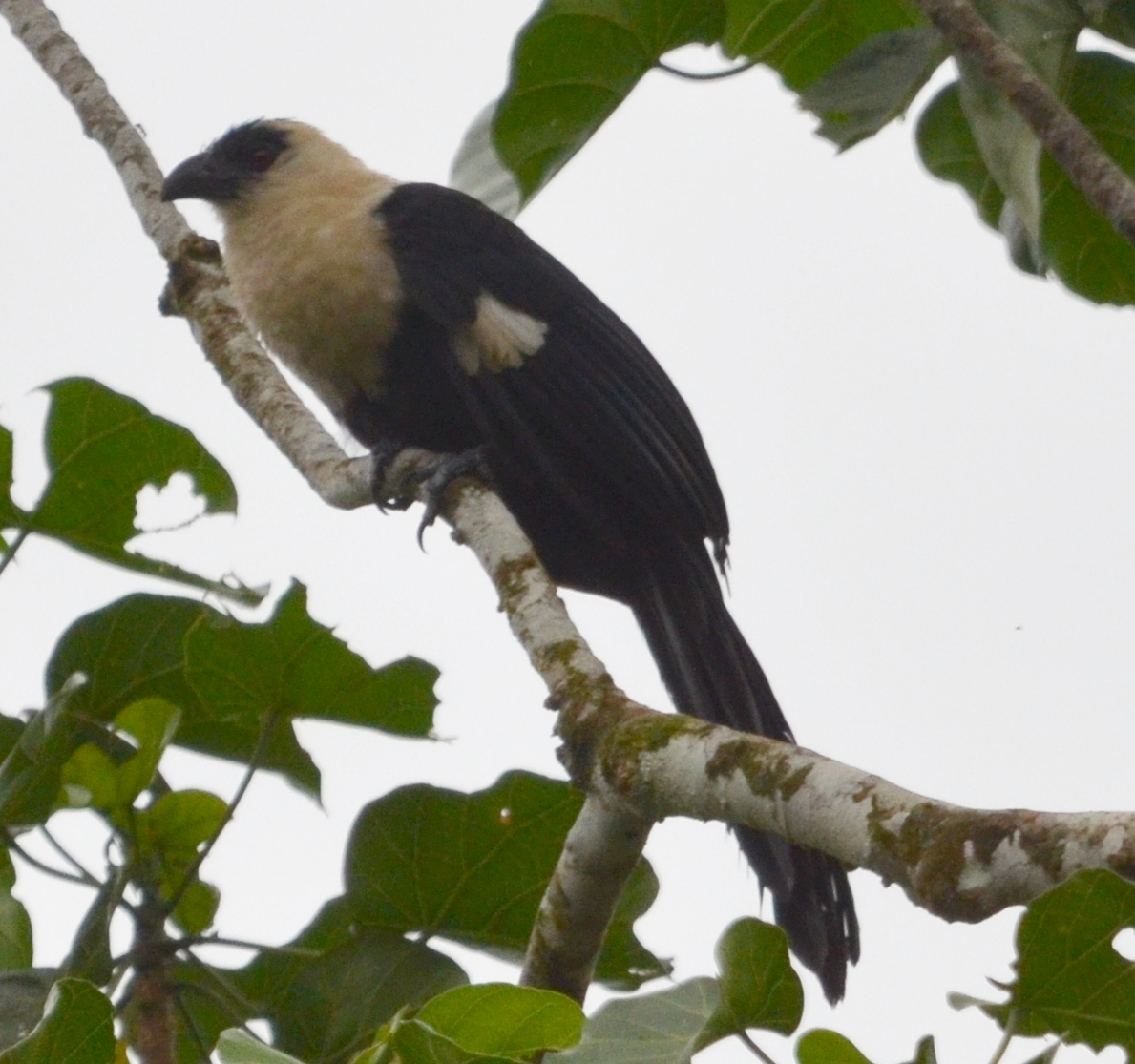

Conservation status
- Least Concern (IUCN 3.1)

Scientific classification
- Kingdom: Animalia
- Phylum: Chordata
- Class: Aves
- Order: Cuculiformes
- Family: Cuculidae
- Genus: Centropus
- Species: C. ateralbus

Binomial name
- Centropus ateralbus Lesson, 1826

= White-necked coucal =

Species of bird

The white-necked coucal or pied coucal (Centropus ateralbus) is a species of cuckoo in the family Cuculidae. It is endemic to the Bismarck Archipelago. Its natural habitat is subtropical or tropical moist lowland forest.
