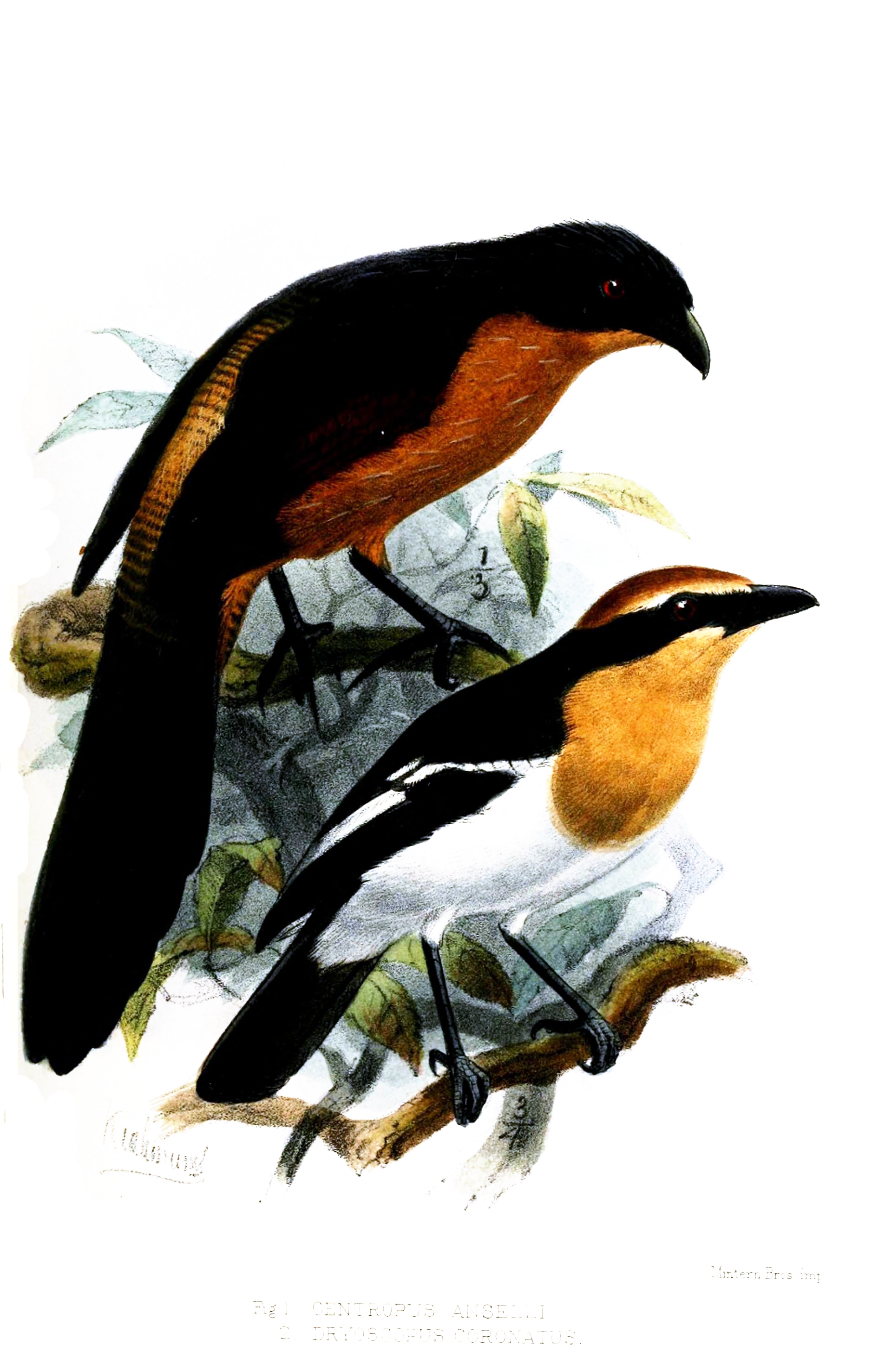
- A Gabon coucal (above)
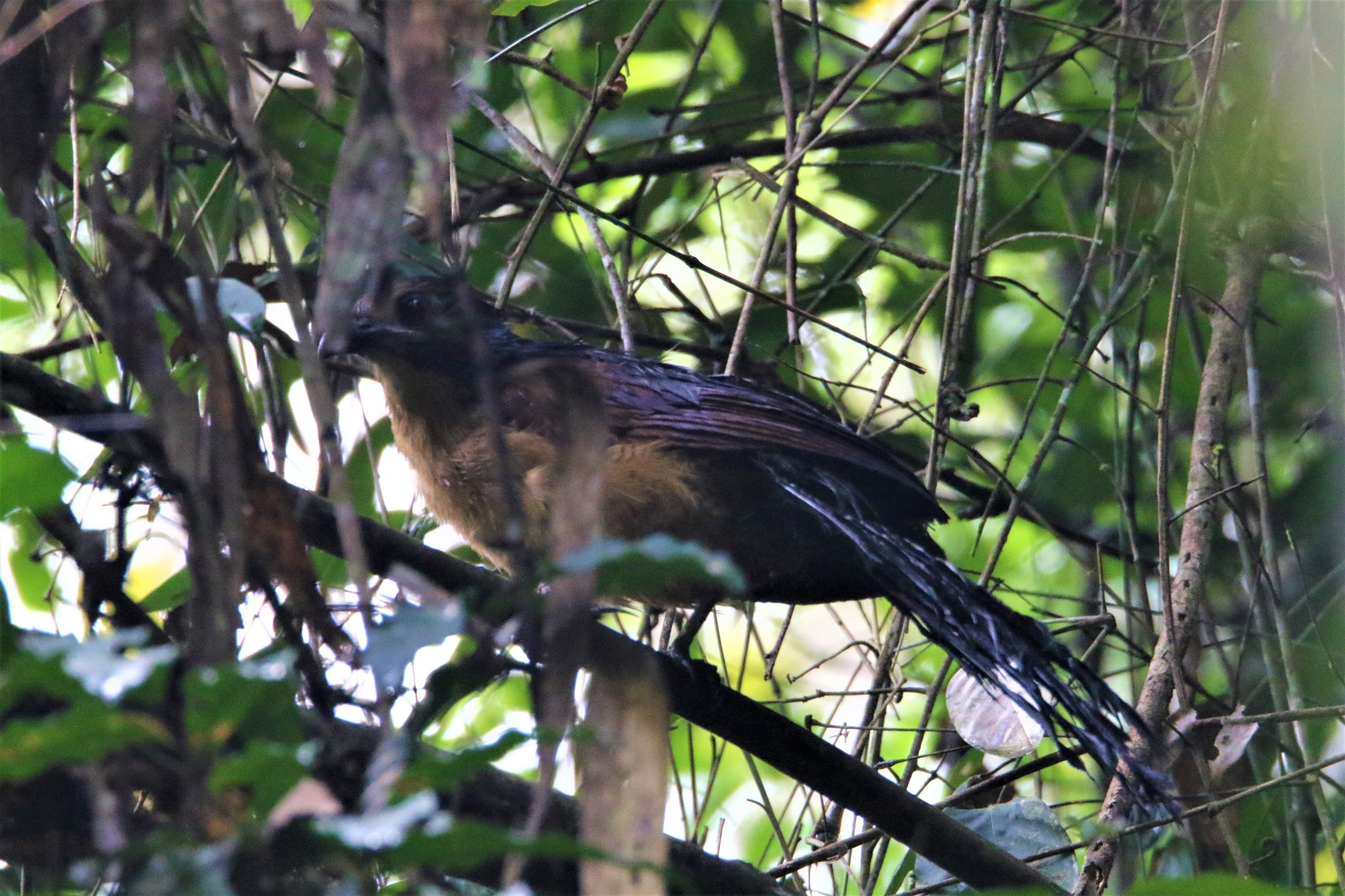

Conservation status
- Least Concern (IUCN 3.1)

Scientific classification
- Kingdom: Animalia
- Phylum: Chordata
- Class: Aves
- Order: Cuculiformes
- Family: Cuculidae
- Genus: Centropus
- Species: C. anselli

Binomial name
- Centropus anselli Sharpe, 1874

= Gabon coucal =

Species of bird

The Gabon coucal (Centropus anselli) is a species of cuckoo in the family Cuculidae. It is mainly found in Gabon but also occurs in neighboring areas of Cameroon, Angola, the Central African Republic, the western Congo Basin and Equatorial Guinea.

== Description ==
The Gabon coucal is a large-sized species growing to 46 to 58 cm (18 to 23 in) in length. The sexes are similar, the adult having the head, sides of neck and back black, glossed with purple, the lower back and rump whitish buff, barred with black, the wings dark brown and dark chestnut and the tail blackish-bronze glossed green. The underparts are rufous-buff or tawny. The eyes are reddish, the beak black and the feet black. The juvenile is similar to the adult but the black colouring is mostly replaced by dark brown and is unglossed, and the wings are heavily barred and rufous.

== Distribution and habitat ==
The Gabon coucal is native to tropical western central Africa. Its range includes Gabon and the surrounding countries of southern Cameroon, southwestern Central African Republic, western Congo, central Democratic Republic of Congo and northwestern Angola. It inhabits virgin forest, secondary forest, forest edges, swampland and abandoned farmland.

== Ecology ==
The Gabon coucal is a skulking bird, not easy to see in the thick undergrowth, but it can be heard calling, particularly early and late in the day. It forages, mostly on the ground, feeding on grasshoppers, beetles, molluscs, frogs, birds, lizards and small snakes. It also scavenges around villages and encampments. Breeding takes place mostly in the rainy season, or in wetter regions, during the drier interlude between two wet seasons.
