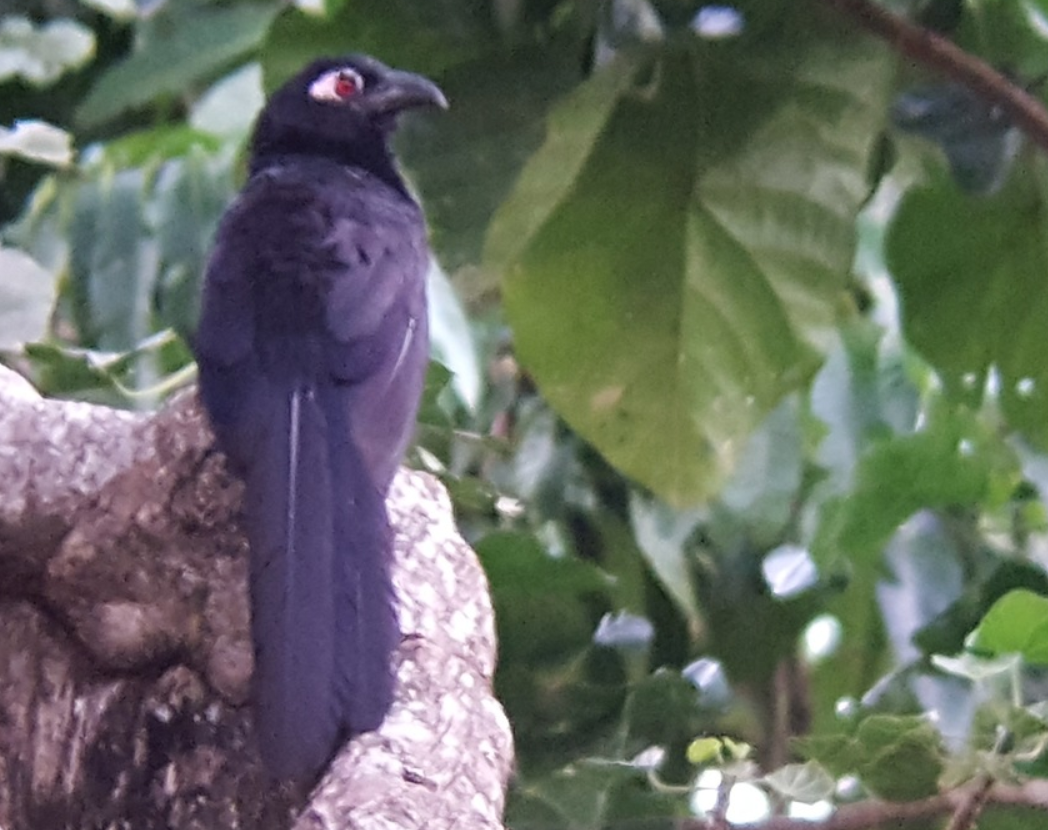

Conservation status
- Least Concern (IUCN 3.1)

Scientific classification
- Kingdom: Animalia
- Phylum: Chordata
- Class: Aves
- Order: Cuculiformes
- Family: Cuculidae
- Genus: Centropus
- Species: C. violaceus

Binomial name
- Centropus violaceus Quoy & Gaimard, 1832
- Approximate distribution map (Papua New Guinea) Year-round

= Violaceous coucal =

Species of bird

The violaceous coucal or violet coucal (Centropus violaceus) is a cuckoo species in the family Cuculidae. It is endemic to the Bismarck Archipelago (Papua New Guinea). Its natural habitat is subtropical or tropical moist lowland forests.

Due to a large range and a population that is not decreasing at a sufficient rate for immediate concern, it is classified as Least concern.
