= Delalande's coua =

- Turnaround video of specimen RMNH 110100, Naturalis Biodiversity Center

Conservation status
- Extinct (1834) (IUCN 3.1)

Scientific classification
- Kingdom: Animalia
- Phylum: Chordata
- Class: Aves
- Order: Cuculiformes
- Family: Cuculidae
- Genus: Coua
- Species: †C. delalandei

Binomial name
- †Coua delalandei (Temminck, 1827)

Synonyms
- Coccycus delalandei Temminck, 1827

Extinct species of bird

Delalande's coua (Coua delalandei), also known as the snail-eating coua or Delalande's coucal, is an extinct species of nonparasitic cuckoo from Madagascar. It was only known to science as an extant bird for a very short time in the early 19th century. Some disagreement exists about its area of occurrence. Although claims were made that the bird was also found in the area of Fito and Maroantsetra, as well as near Toamasina (Tamatave), i.e., the coastal areas of northern Toamasina Province, all specimens with good locality data are from the offshore island of Nosy Boraha. As the vernacular name implies, land snails were a favored food item of this species.

== Extinction ==
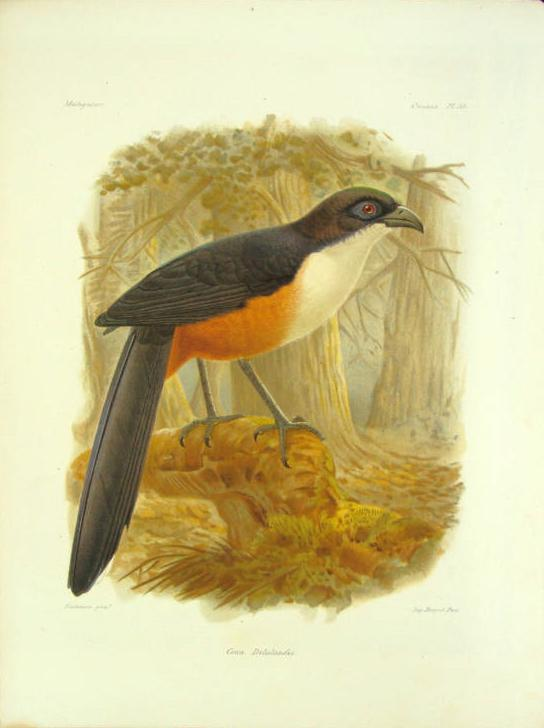
Chromolithic print

Of the 14 specimens that exist nowadays, all but two are known to have been taken between 1827 and 1834, many by surgeon and naturalist Chevalier Joseph Alphonse Bernier. The Paris type specimen was in the collection of the Muséum national d'Histoire naturelle before that date, and one specimen may have been taken as late as 1850. As this species – the second-largest coua extant in modern times – was very spectacular, it was much sought-after as a museum piece. However, it probably was restricted to coastal rainforest on Nosy Boraha, and its habitat was largely destroyed by deforestation in the course of the 19th century. Introduction of black rats may also have contributed to its demise, probably less by direct predation than by competition for food, but a thriving rat population probably was on Nosy Boraha as soon as 1700, considering that the island was a favorite place for pirates to overhaul. Cats, which would have preyed on the bird, were probably introduced only in the 19th century and make a more likely candidate for an introduced species that had a negative impact on Delalande's coua.

Locals on the adjacent mainland reportedly were still occasionally hunting this bird for its decorative plumage in the 1920s, but these seem in error and probably refer to the blue coua. In 1932, though, large sums were offered to well-connected animal dealers in Antananarivo for specimens of Delalande's coua, but they were unable to procure any. The color pattern of the species is unique among couas, which may be a hint that it evolved, in fact, in the isolation of Nosy Boraha and never occurred anywhere else. Specimens from "Tamatave" probably just indicate their port of shipment or the location of the animal dealer who procured them.
