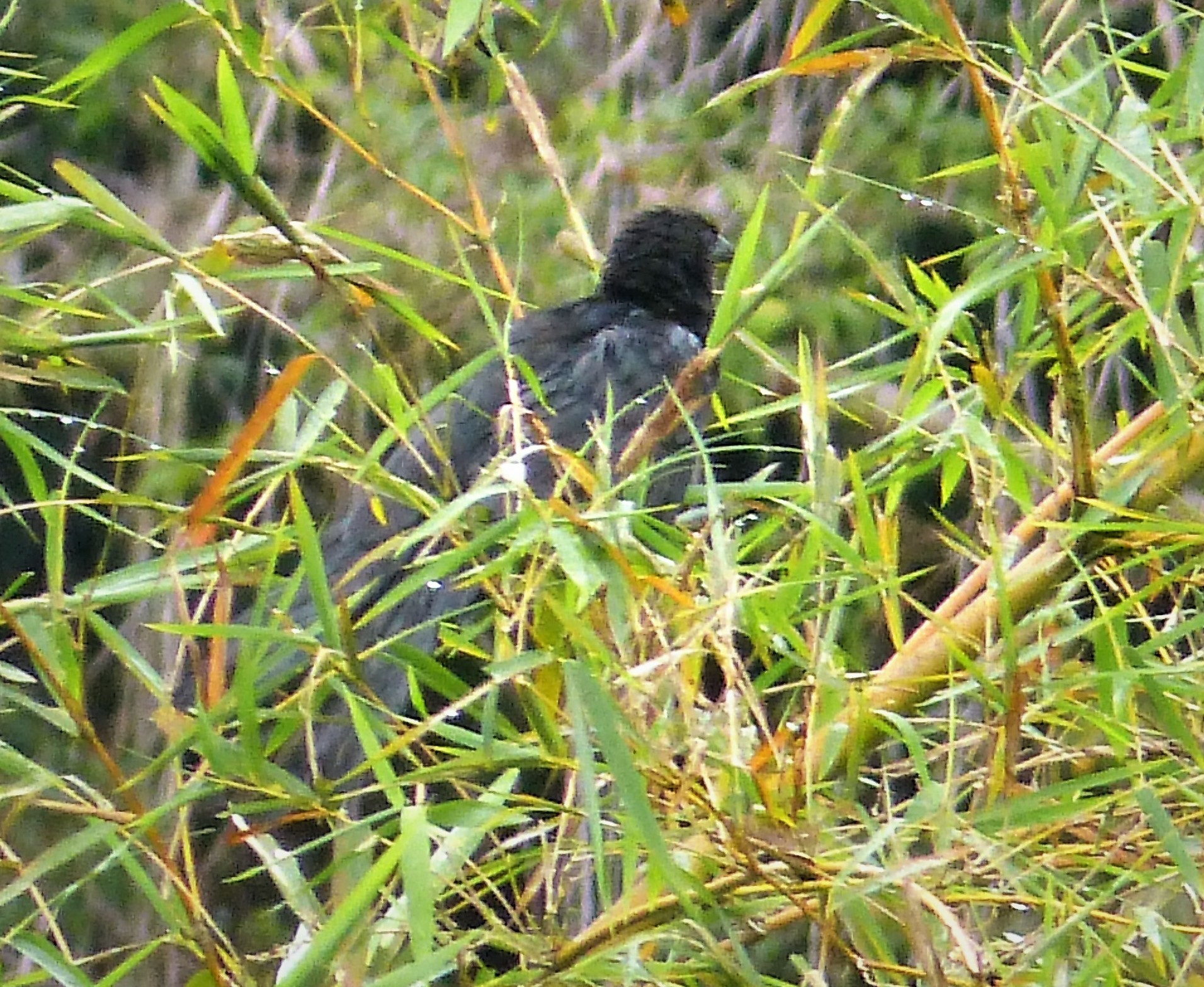

Conservation status
- Least Concern (IUCN 3.1)

Scientific classification
- Kingdom: Animalia
- Phylum: Chordata
- Class: Aves
- Order: Cuculiformes
- Family: Cuculidae
- Genus: Centropus
- Species: C. bernsteini

Binomial name
- Centropus bernsteini Schlegel, 1866

= Black-billed coucal =

Species of bird

The black-billed coucal or lesser black coucal (Centropus bernsteini) is a species of cuckoo in the family Cuculidae. It is found in New Guinea.
