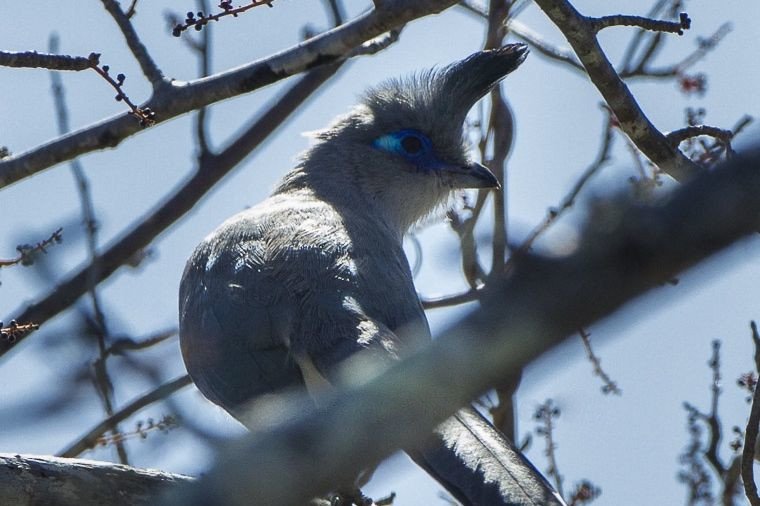

Conservation status
- Least Concern (IUCN 3.1)

Scientific classification
- Kingdom: Animalia
- Phylum: Chordata
- Class: Aves
- Order: Cuculiformes
- Family: Cuculidae
- Genus: Coua
- Species: C. verreauxi

Binomial name
- Coua verreauxi Grandidier, A, 1867

= Verreaux's coua =

Species of bird

Verreaux's coua (Coua verreauxi) is a species of cuckoo in the family Cuculidae. It is endemic to Madagascar. According to a BBC documentary, it is found only near a salt lake in the southern part of the island. The lake is 16 km long but only a couple of metres deep. The area has been drying out for the last 40,000 years and the organisms living here have become adapted to conserve water.

The bird's name commemorates French ornithologist and collector Jules Verreaux.

Its natural habitat is subtropical or tropical dry shrubland. The birds are found in southern part of the spiny forest zone. They live in coastal euphorbia scrub, and are most active at dawn and dusk. Birders listen for its descending series of loud contact calls, "corick-corick-corick-corick". A sympatric species is the crested coua, C. cristata.

== Identification ==
The species is described thus: "A small, greyish arboreal coua. Overall mid-grey, whitish on lower breast and belly, and darker on flight-feathers. Tail dark greyish, long and tipped whitish on outer feathers. Head with long, dark-tipped crest, pale blue bare skin around eye and black bill."

== Distribution and habitat ==
Verreaux's coua is endemic to the southwestern tip of Madagascar within the spiny forest zone. Its typical habitat is thick scrub on coral rag but it also occurs in other habitat types including within degraded areas.

== Behaviour ==
The bird forages for invertebrates among trees and bushes and on the ground. It also eats Cassia fruit. It occurs from sea-level to 100 metres (330 ft). Little is known of its reproductive habits but males are sometimes seen singing from the tops of trees in November suggesting that this is the breeding season.

== Status ==
The IUCN has rated Verreaux's coua as being "Least Concern". It has a small range and is threatened by habitat loss. The main threat it faces is the cutting of trees in the scrubland where it lives to make charcoal which happens especially alongside roads and near towns. Nevertheless, it is quite common in suitable habitats.
