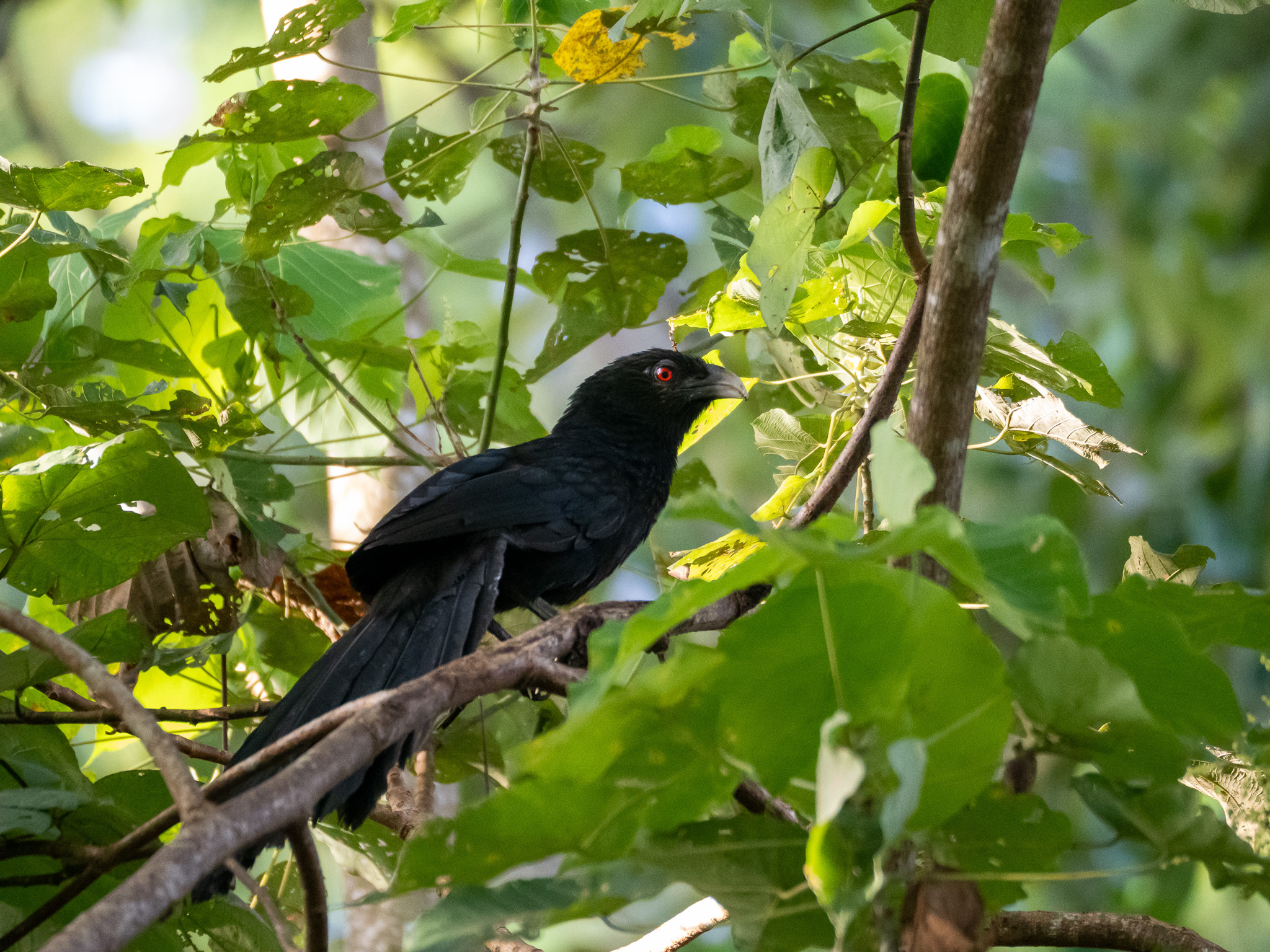

Conservation status
- Least Concern (IUCN 3.1)

Scientific classification
- Kingdom: Animalia
- Phylum: Chordata
- Class: Aves
- Order: Cuculiformes
- Family: Cuculidae
- Genus: Centropus
- Species: C. menbeki

Binomial name
- Centropus menbeki Lesson & Garnot, 1828

= Ivory-billed coucal =

Species of bird

The ivory-billed coucal or greater black coucal (Centropus menbeki) is a species of cuckoo in the family Cuculidae. It is found in the Aru Islands and New Guinea. Its natural habitat is subtropical or tropical moist lowland forest.
