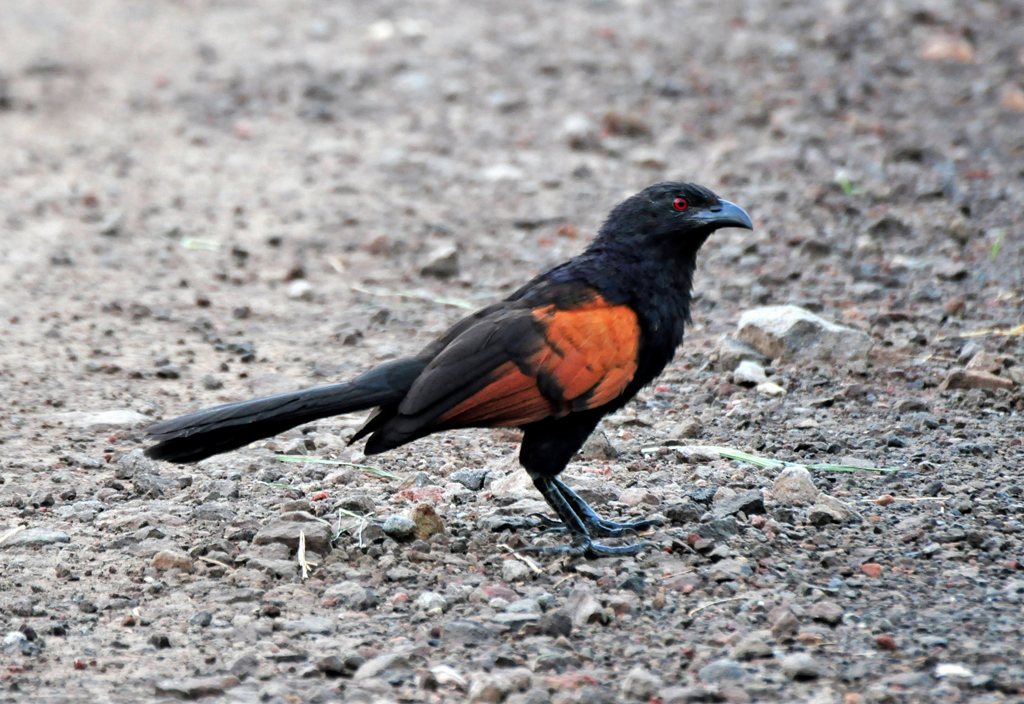
- At mangroves near Surabaya, East Java

Conservation status
- Vulnerable (IUCN 3.1)

Scientific classification
- Kingdom: Animalia
- Phylum: Chordata
- Class: Aves
- Order: Cuculiformes
- Family: Cuculidae
- Genus: Centropus
- Species: C. nigrorufus

Binomial name
- Centropus nigrorufus (Cuvier, 1816)

= Sunda coucal =

Species of bird

The Sunda coucal (Centropus nigrorufus), also known as the Javanese lathe, is a cuckoo species in the family Cuculidae that is endemic to Java, Indonesia. It inhabits mangroves, freshwater swamp forests and grasslands near brackish water. It has been listed as Vulnerable on the IUCN Red List since 1994, as the small population is threatened by habitat destruction and trapping. It feeds on grasshoppers, ground beetles, moths, geckos, snakes and frogs; it was also observed while picking rice seeds in a paddy field.
