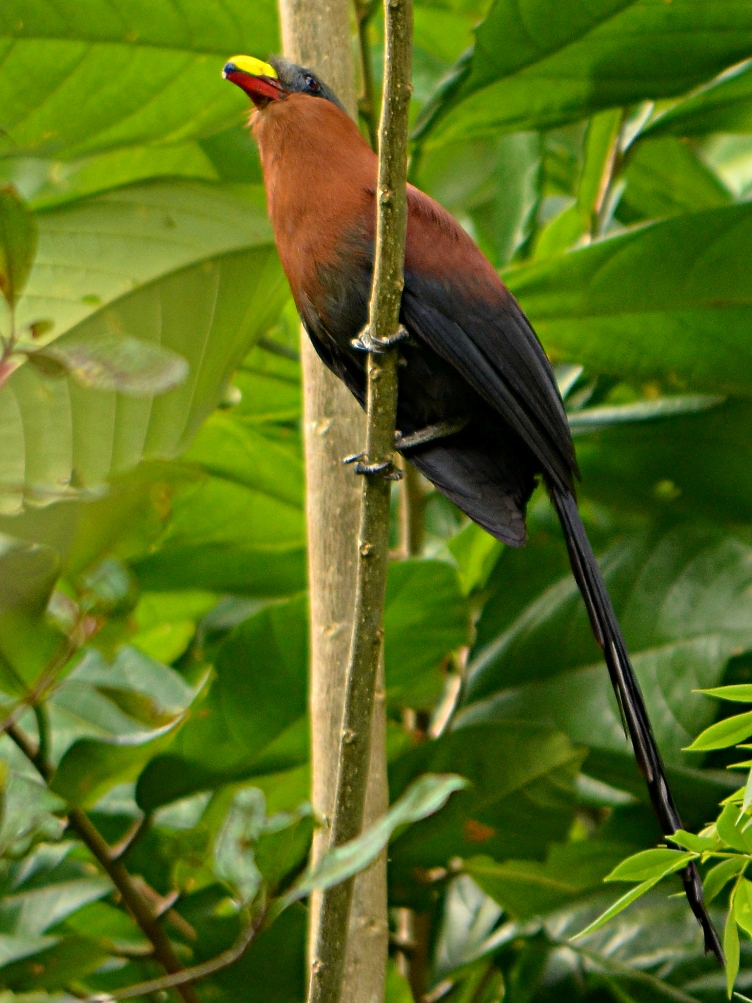

Conservation status
- Least Concern (IUCN 3.1)

Scientific classification
- Kingdom: Animalia
- Phylum: Chordata
- Class: Aves
- Order: Cuculiformes
- Family: Cuculidae
- Genus: Rhamphococcyx; Cabanis & Heine, 1863
- Species: R. calyorhynchus

Binomial name
- Rhamphococcyx calyorhynchus (Temminck, 1825)

Synonyms
- Phaenicophaeus calyorhynchus

= Yellow-billed malkoha =

Species of bird

The yellow-billed malkoha (Rhamphococcyx calyorhynchus) is a species of cuckoo in the family Cuculidae. It is endemic to Sulawesi, Indonesia. Its natural habitat is subtropical or tropical moist lowland forests.

It often follows moor macaques.
