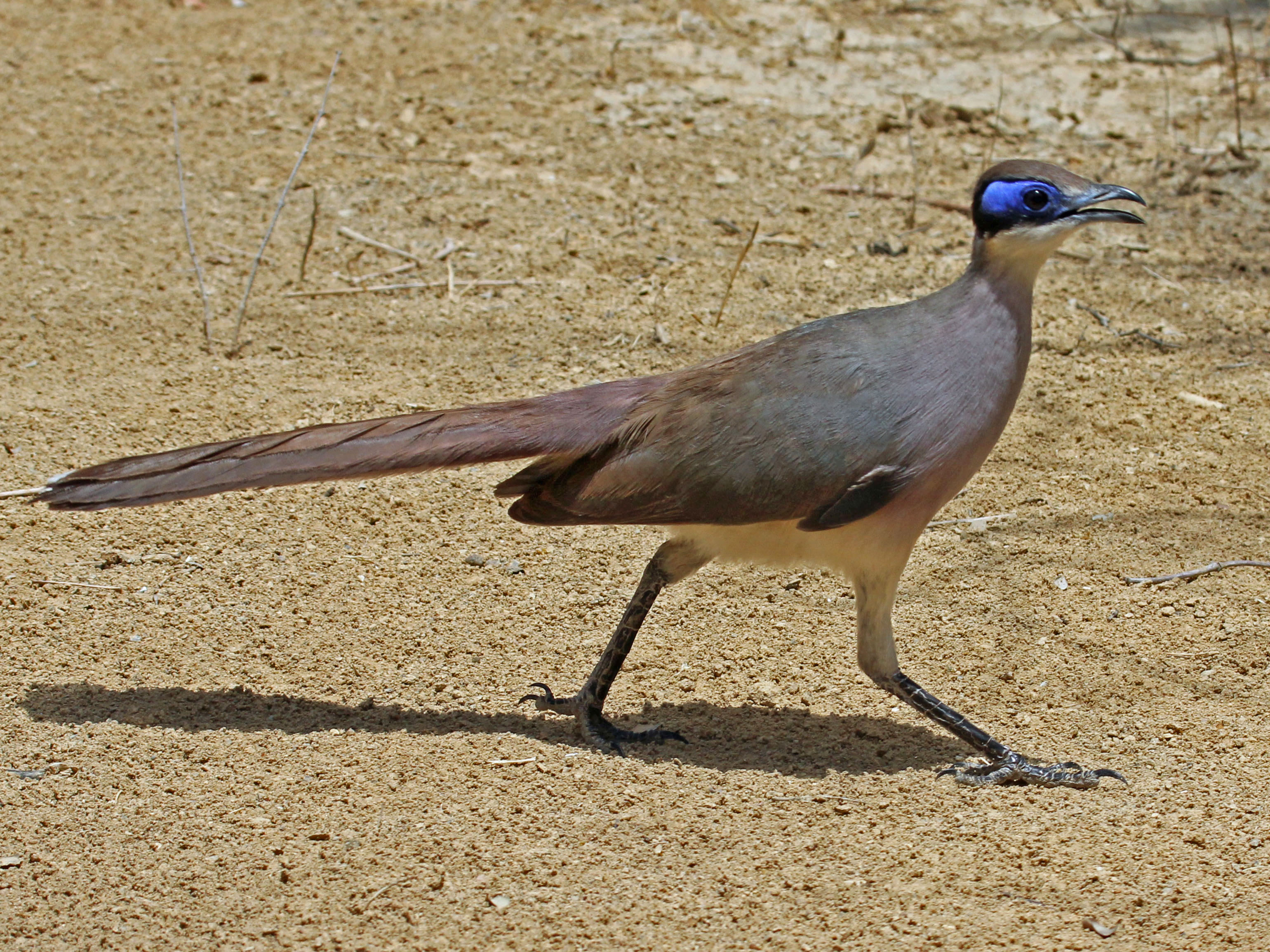

Conservation status
- Least Concern (IUCN 3.1)

Scientific classification
- Kingdom: Animalia
- Phylum: Chordata
- Class: Aves
- Order: Cuculiformes
- Family: Cuculidae
- Genus: Coua
- Species: C. olivaceiceps

Binomial name
- Coua olivaceiceps (Sharpe, 1873)

= Olive-capped coua =

Species of bird

The olive-capped coua (Coua olivaceiceps) is a species of cuckoo in the family Cuculidae. It is endemic to southwest Madagascar.

The olive-capped coua was formally described in 1873 by the English ornithologist Richard Bowdler Sharpe under the binomial name Sericosomus olivaceiceps. Sharpe specified the type locality as southwestern Madagascar. He had been sent a specimen by the French naturalist Alfred Grandidier. The olive-capped coua is now one of ten species placed in the genus Coua, all of which are endemic to Madagascar. The specific epithet olivaceiceps combines the Modern Latin olivaceus meaning "olive-coloured" with Latin -ceps meaning "capped".

The olive-capped coua was formerly treated as a subspecies of the red-capped coua (Coua ruficeps). It was elevated to species status based on differences in plumage and vocalisation.
