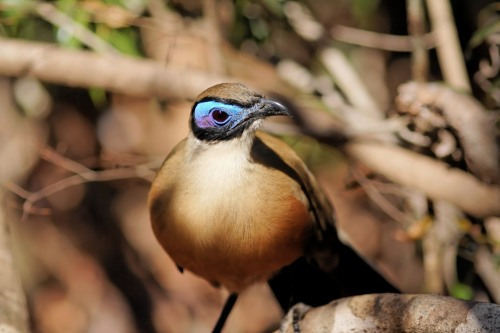

Conservation status
- Vulnerable (IUCN 3.1)

Scientific classification
- Kingdom: Animalia
- Phylum: Chordata
- Class: Aves
- Order: Cuculiformes
- Family: Cuculidae
- Genus: Coua
- Species: C. gigas

Binomial name
- Coua gigas (Boddaert, 1783)
- General Range of giant coua in Madagascar

= Giant coua =

Species of bird

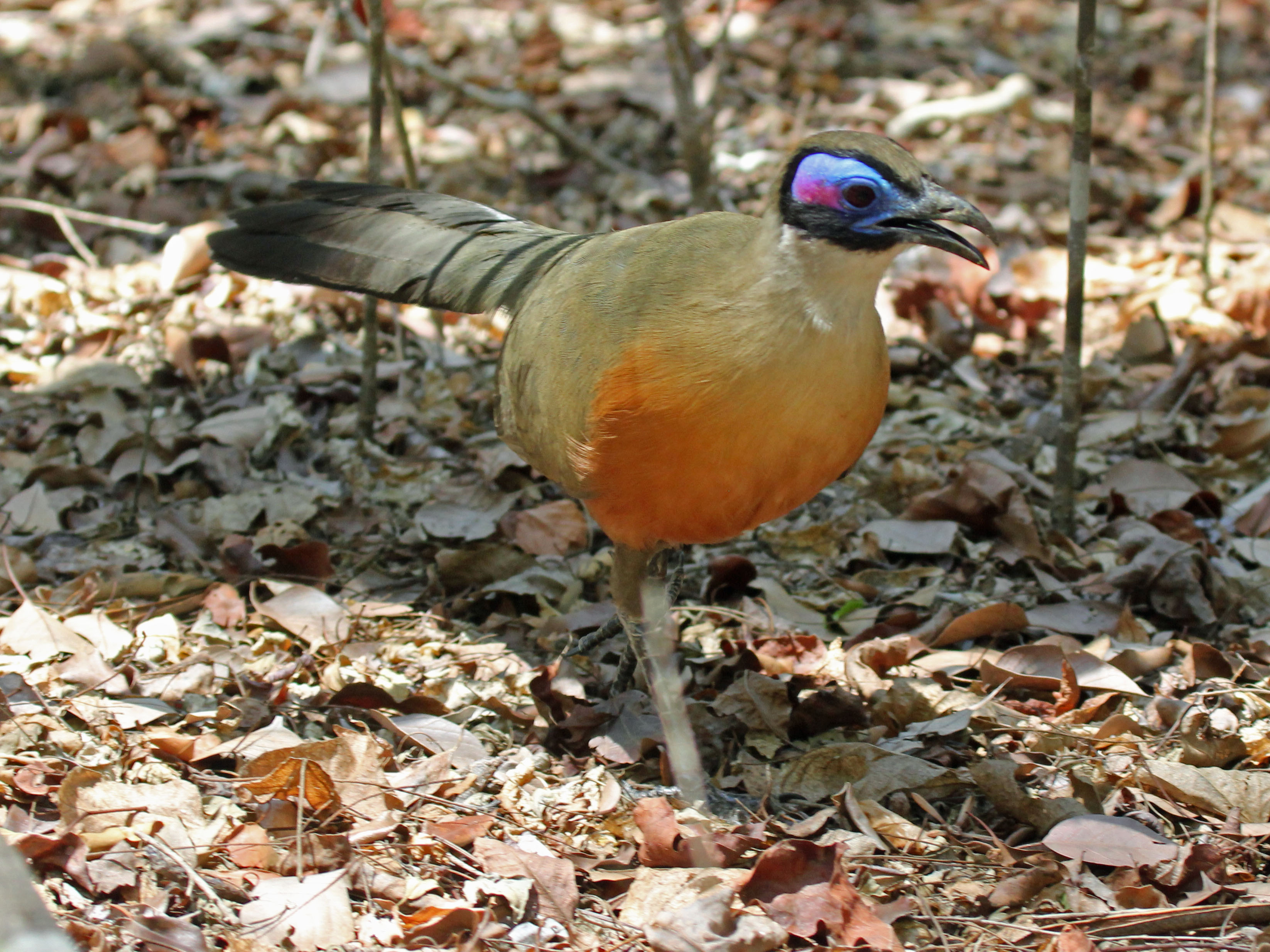
Kirindy Forest, Madagascar

The giant coua (Coua gigas) is a bird species from the Coua genus in the cuckoo family that is endemic to the dry forests of western and southern Madagascar. Couas probably originated from a particular Asian ground-cuckoo. The genus Coua contains 10 species, more than any other genus in Madagascar. This species is listed as Vulnerable by the IUCN due to a rapidly decreasing population, resulting from defroestation and hunting pressures.

== Taxonomy ==
The giant coua was described by French polymath Georges-Louis Leclerc, Comte de Buffon in 1780 in his Histoire Naturelle des Oiseaux. The bird was also illustrated in a hand-coloured plate engraved by François-Nicolas Martinet in the Planches Enluminées D'Histoire Naturelle, which was produced under the supervision of Edme-Louis Daubenton to accompany Buffon's text. Neither the plate caption nor Buffon's description included a scientific name, but in 1783, Dutch naturalist Pieter Boddaert coined the binomial name Cuculus gigas in his catalogue of the Planches Enluminées. The giant coua is now placed in the genus Coua that was erected by the Swiss naturalist Heinrich Rudolf Schinz in 1821. The generic name is from koa, the Malagasy word for the couas. The specific epithet gigas is the Latin word for "giant". The species is monotypic.

== Description ==
Giant couas are about 62 cm (24 in) in length (nearly double the size of Coua coquereli) and have a blue patch around their eyes, characteristic of the genus and similar to African turacos. As a member of the cuckoo family, they have a reversible third toe and resemble coucals in their method of scrambling through entangled vines for food. Observations indicate that they can climb 10 m (33 ft) high from the ground.

Coua gigas subsists on seeds (Capurodendron madagascariensis and Buxus madagascariensis), insects, and some small vertebrates such as chameleons (Furcifer spp.). This species is often encountered in large, unlogged gallery forests that lack dense shrub layers, which provides greater mobility and implies a preference for undisturbed forest with tall trees. In logged forests, giant couas usually glean during dry seasons and more often leap and sally during rainy seasons. In contrast, they have been found to do the opposite in forested areas (more often glean during rainy seasons and more often probe during dry seasons), which suggests the significant role that environment plays in foraging behaviour. Giant coua tend to use microhabitats in logged forests with a greater canopy cover, and forage in logged gallery forests with higher canopies than other areas, while avoiding sites with more stems and obstacles .

== Distribution and habitat ==
Coua gigas is found in the lowlands of western and southern Madagascar up to 700 m elevation. The range of this bird species is considered large with an estimated global extent of occurrence of 50,000-100,000 km^{2}. Global population size has not been quantified. but is believed to be large, since it is described as common in at least parts of its range. Similarly, global population trends are not available, and though the species is not believed to be approaching the population decline thresholds for the criterion of the IUCN Red List (i.e. declining more than 30% in 10 years or three generations), some evidence for population decline exists. This summarizes the reasons for evaluating giant coua as least concern by the official Red List Authority for birds for IUCN.

== Conservation status ==
Several studies support the need to conserve the giant coua. C. gigas is among the locally vulnerable species of Madagascar that are occasionally hunted and trapped by children. Disturbance by fire or logging can potentially compromise their resource use and result in an added threat to these species. Human alteration modifies the habitat structure and affects foraging behavior and habitat selection. Selective logging is a major disturbance for forest insectivorous birds such as the giant coua. Logging reduces C. gigas density, and increased logging or burning could reduce the optimal habitat and decrease the population density of this species. It behoves the conservation authorities to retain a diversity of foraging nutrients in different habitat types to sustain the normal foraging activities of these birds.

Continual studies of giant coua's foraging compliments forest conservation. Selective logging could be restricted to the typically dry forest, while gallery forests could be kept as corridors for conservation, especially for this species. Conservation of the gallery forest would be improved by logging both forest types (gallery and dry) at the same rate and implementing fire-control measures.

Recent sightings in Sainte Luce testify that the tail of the giant coua appears to be longer than in other regions. This negates the supposition that the genus has no morphological specialization, instead indicating distinctive morphological differences that warrant further studies for species change. Sainte Luce is currently one of the best areas to see these birds in certain forest fragments that should have long-term management to foster limited populations. As one of the proposed conservation zones currently managed by the local community, the region has great potential for ecotourism to promote continued conservation of the species.

== See also ==
- Endemic birds of Madagascar and western Indian Ocean islands
