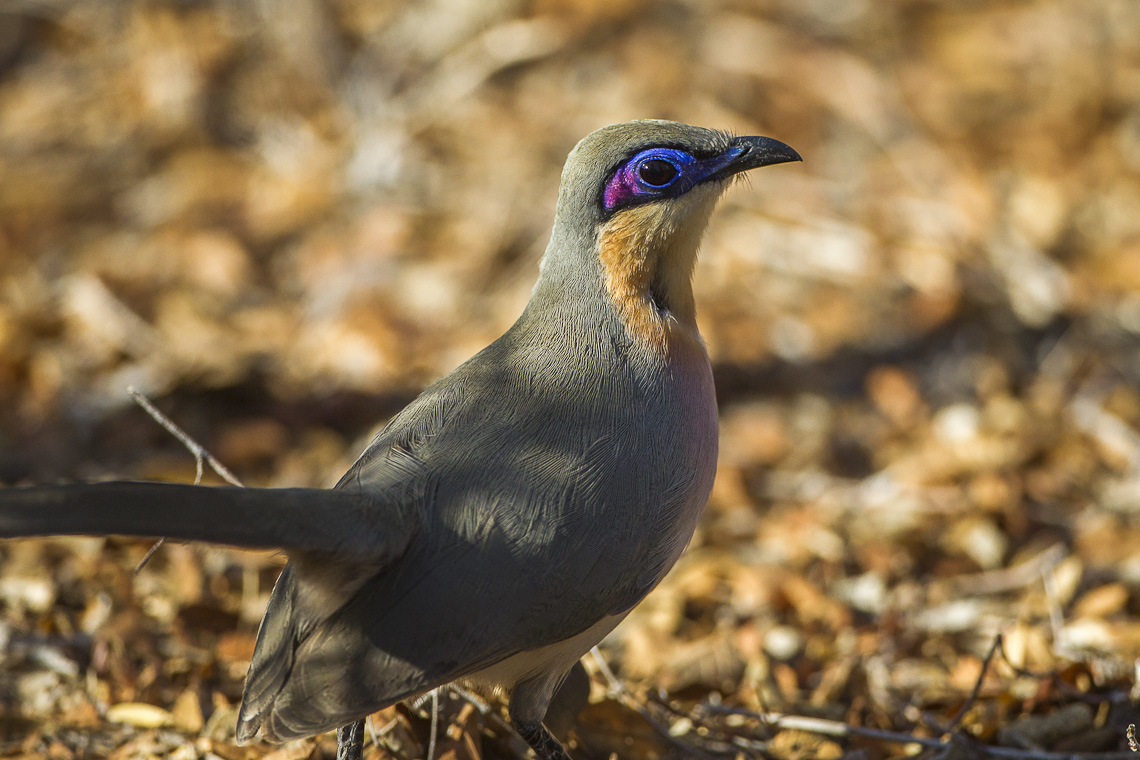

Conservation status
- Least Concern (IUCN 3.1)

Scientific classification
- Kingdom: Animalia
- Phylum: Chordata
- Class: Aves
- Order: Cuculiformes
- Family: Cuculidae
- Genus: Coua
- Species: C. cursor

Binomial name
- Coua cursor Grandidier, 1867

= Running coua =

Species of bird

The running coua (Coua cursor) is a species of cuckoo in the family Cuculidae. It is endemic to Madagascar.

Its natural habitat is subtropical or tropical dry forests.

== Description ==
Adult running coua are approximately 34–40 centimetres (13–16 in) in length. Adults appear grey-green above, with a blue and pink face outlined in black and dark blue skin around the eye. The back is bright pink, outlined by black feathers. The running coau's breast is purplish. Juveniles have similar coloration, although duller, and without black on the face.

== Distribution and habitat ==
The running coua is endemic to Madagascar, and is found to the south and south-west of the island. Its typical habitat is sub-arid thorn scrub, spiny desert, dry woodlands, and low forest bush. The running coau is not globally threatened.

== Behavior and ecology ==
The running coau is a terrestrial bird, typically found alone or in a pair. It walks and hops on the ground, running when threatened. Its diet consists of beetles, ants, spiders, and plants.

The running coau breeds during the rainy season, and lays its eggs during October. It nests in a bush about two metres (6 ft 7 in) above the ground, building its nest of twigs and bark, lined with leaf stalks.
