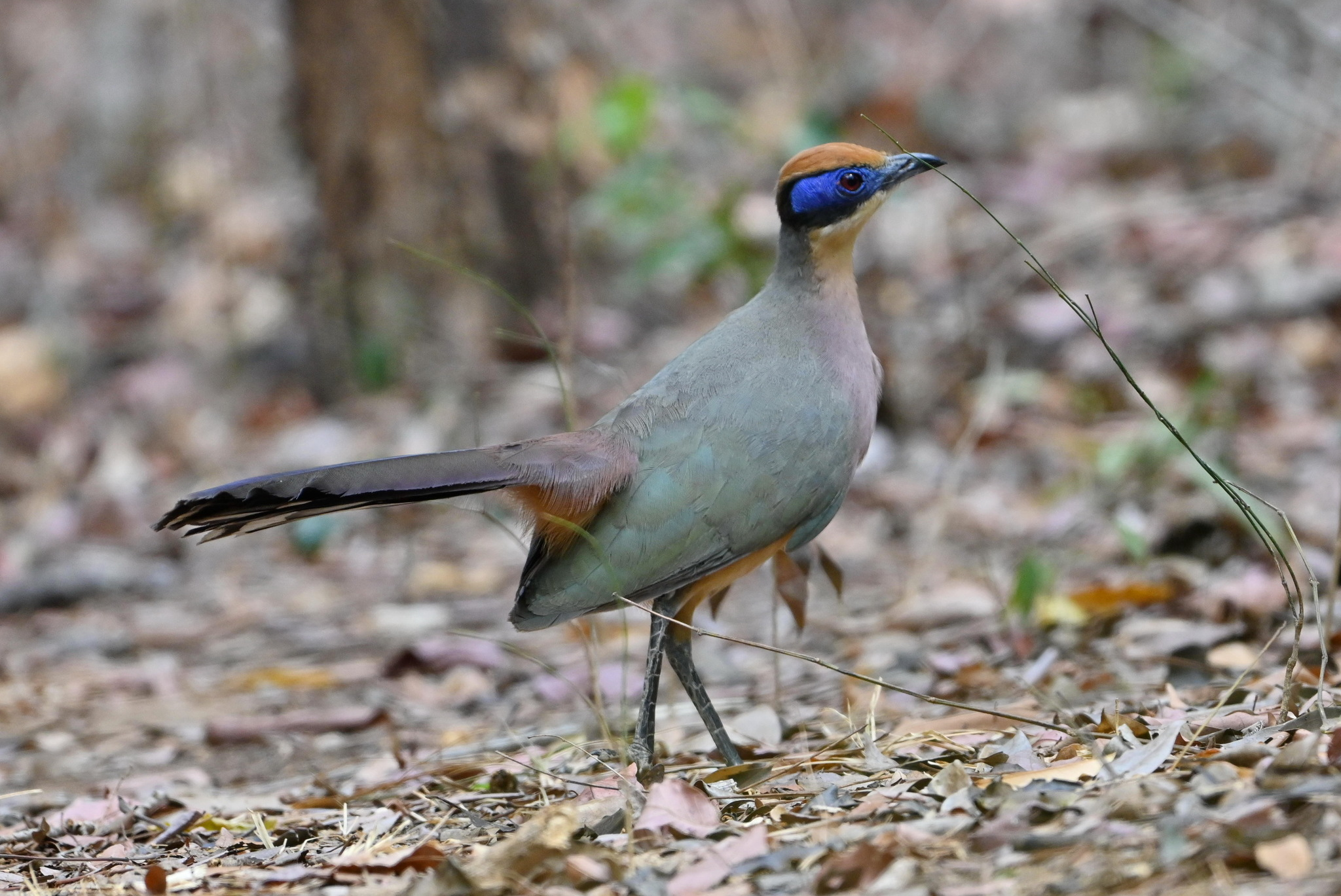

Conservation status
- Least Concern (IUCN 3.1)

Scientific classification
- Kingdom: Animalia
- Phylum: Chordata
- Class: Aves
- Order: Cuculiformes
- Family: Cuculidae
- Genus: Coua
- Species: C. ruficeps

Binomial name
- Coua ruficeps G.R. Gray, 1846

= Red-capped coua =

Species of bird

The red-capped coua (Coua ruficeps) is a species of cuckoo in the family Cuculidae. It is endemic to northwest Madagascar.

Its natural habitats are subtropical or tropical dry forest and subtropical or tropical moist lowland forest.

The olive-capped coua was formerly treated as a subspecies of the red-capped coua but has been elevated to species status based on the differences in plumage and vocalisation.
