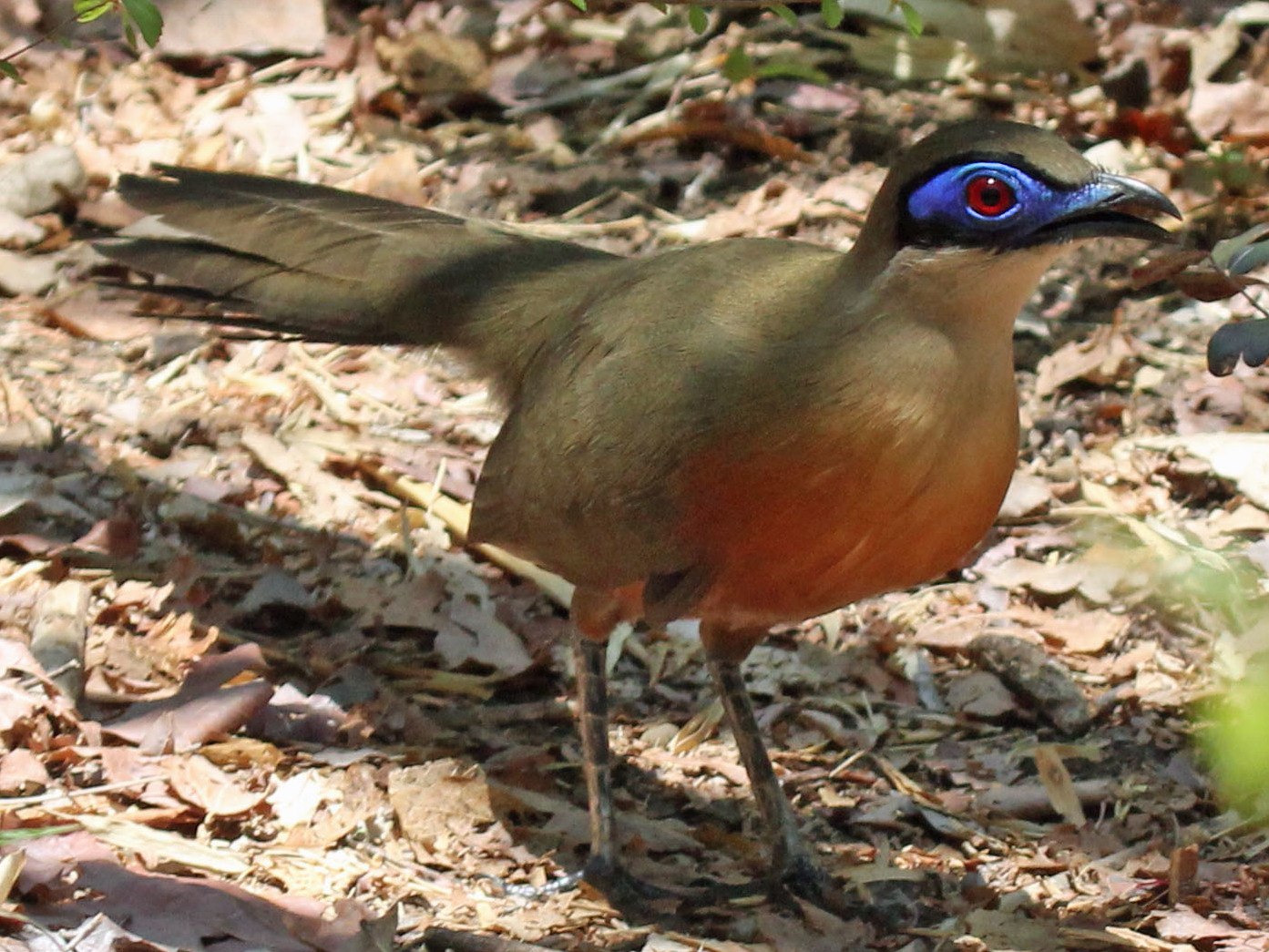
- at Kirindy Forest, Madagascar

Conservation status
- Least Concern (IUCN 3.1)

Scientific classification
- Kingdom: Animalia
- Phylum: Chordata
- Class: Aves
- Order: Cuculiformes
- Family: Cuculidae
- Genus: Coua
- Species: C. coquereli

Binomial name
- Coua coquereli Grandidier, 1867

= Coquerel's coua =

Species of bird

Coquerel's coua (Coua coquereli) is a species of cuckoo in the family Cuculidae. It is endemic to Madagascar. Its habitat is subtropical or tropical dry forests. It was named in 1867 by the French naturalist Alfred Grandidier in honor of the French navy surgeon and naturalist Charles Coquerel.

== Description ==
Coquerel's coua is approximately 40 cm (16 in) in length and has a large blue patch of bare skin around the eye, a characteristic of the Coua genus that is similar to African turacos. The plumage is silky, the crown is black, the upper parts and tail are light brown or greyish-brown, and the lower breast and belly is suffused with red. The iris is red and the beak and legs are slaty grey. As a member of the cuckoo family, it has a reversible third toe and resembles the coucal in its method of scrambling through tangled bushes and lianas while searching for food. Observations indicate that it can climb about 10 m (30 ft) above the ground.

== Distribution and habitat ==
Coquerel's coua is endemic to Madagascar where it lives in the dry deciduous forest and gallery forest in the west of the island. It shares this habitat with the giant coua (Coua gigas). In this area, the wet season is from December to February, and this is followed by a long dry season.

== Behaviour ==
Coquerel's coua is predominantly a ground-dwelling bird. It feeds mainly on insects and other arthropods, with seeds also forming part of the diet. The diet and the feeding strategies used vary with the season, and include gleaning, probing the litter, chasing prey, leaping and sallying into the air to catch insects.

Coquerel's coua is a solitary bird during most of the year, each bird having a home range. Towards the end of the dry season, birds form monogamous pairs, usually jointly occupying their individual home ranges. Breeding takes place in the wet season, between November and April. On several occasions males have been observed approaching females carrying a gift (a caterpillar or a grasshopper), but after mating, has consumed the insect himself. The nests are built a few metres off the ground in dense vegetation. Unlike most other cuckoos, this bird builds its own nest, incubates its own eggs and rears its young. Clutch size averages 1.8 and the minimum incubation time is 13 days. The young have a patterned interior to the mouth (as do several related species) which may visually stimulate the parent to feed the juvenile. They leave the nest after about nine days, when still covered with down and unable to fly. They then perch on the ground or among the undergrowth awaiting visits by the adults, which feed them caterpillars and crickets. This early fledging may be because of the danger of nest predation by such predators as the narrow-striped mongoose, the small Indian civet and the common brown lemur, snakes such as the Malagasy giant hognose, and birds such as the Madagascar harrier-hawk, the cuckoo roller and the Malagasy coucal.

== Status ==
Although Coquerel's coua has a limited range in western Madagascar and the population appears to be decreasing, this is a slow trend and the bird is plentiful within its range. For these reasons, the International Union for Conservation of Nature has assessed its conservation status as being of least concern.
