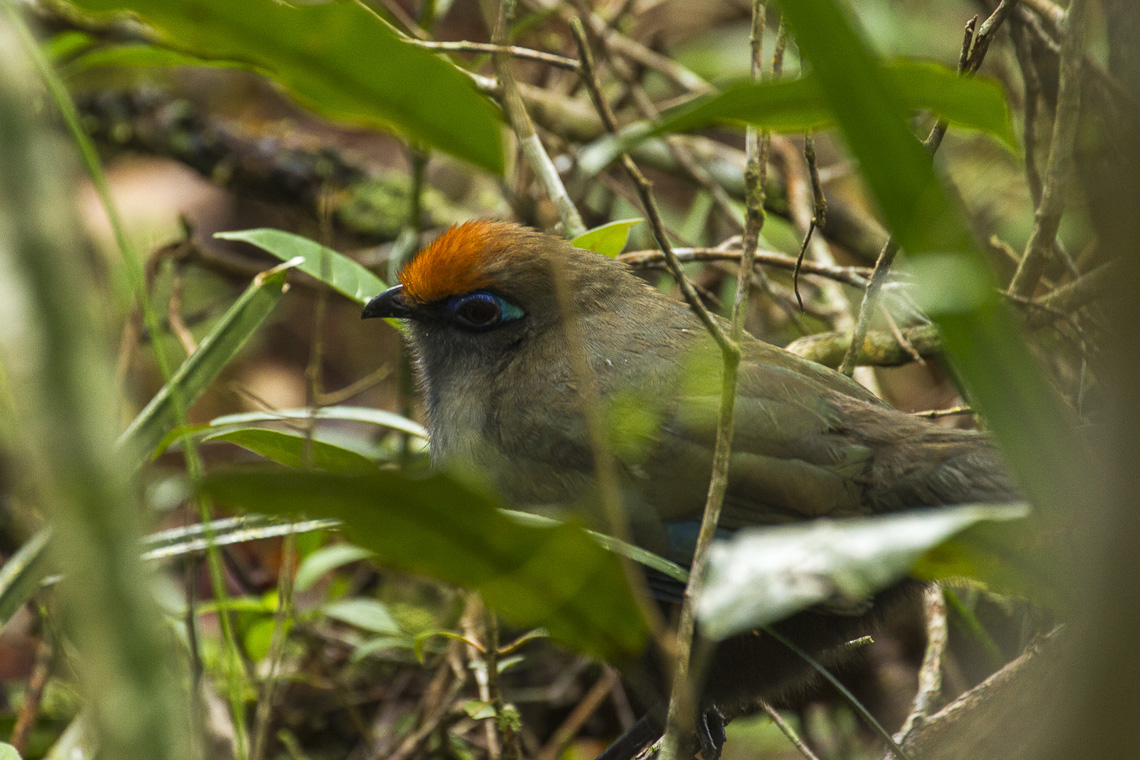

Conservation status
- Least Concern (IUCN 3.1)

Scientific classification
- Kingdom: Animalia
- Phylum: Chordata
- Class: Aves
- Order: Cuculiformes
- Family: Cuculidae
- Genus: Coua
- Species: C. reynaudii

Binomial name
- Coua reynaudii Pucheran, 1845

= Red-fronted coua =

Species of bird

The red-fronted coua (Coua reynaudii) is a species of cuckoo in the family Cuculidae. It is endemic to Madagascar.

Its natural habitat is subtropical or tropical moist lowland forests.
