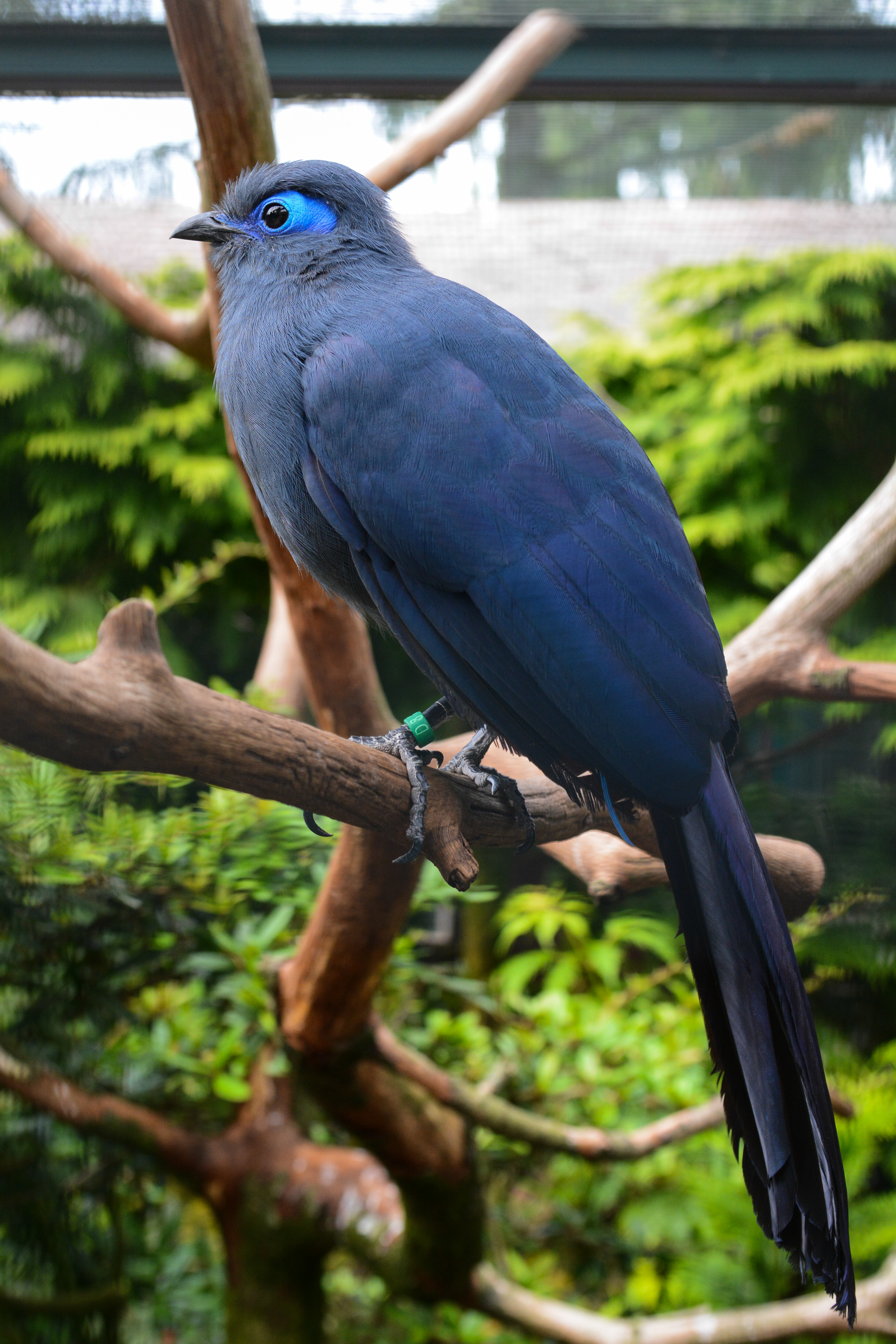

Conservation status
- Least Concern (IUCN 3.1)

Scientific classification
- Kingdom: Animalia
- Phylum: Chordata
- Class: Aves
- Order: Cuculiformes
- Family: Cuculidae
- Genus: Coua
- Species: C. caerulea

Binomial name
- Coua caerulea (Linnaeus, 1766)

Synonyms
- Cuculus caeruleus Linnaeus, 1766

= Blue coua =

Species of bird

The blue coua (Coua caerulea) is a species of bird in the cuckoo family, Cuculidae. It is endemic to the island of Madagascar.

== Taxonomy ==
This species was described by Carl Linnaeus in 1766. There was once twelve species of Coua but only eight or nine are still extant. The genus Coua derives from koa, the Malagasy name for a cuckoo. In French the bird is known as Coua bleu.

== Description ==
The bird's feathers are a deep blue and there is a distinctive blue oval area around the eye which is free of feathers. Like all cuckoos they have large feet, with a reversible third toe. It has a bulky silhouette and short, broad wings and long tail, all of which can be seen when gliding between trees. The average size of the birds is 48 to 50 cm (18.9 to 19.7 in) in length and 30 to 60 grams (1.1 to 2.1 ounces) in weight with the females slightly larger. The calls are evenly spaced ″koa koa koa″ notes and a brief ″brreee″.

== Ecology ==
The blue coua is an omnivore eating insects, fruits and small reptiles in subtropical or tropical dry forest, subtropical or tropical moist lowland forest, subtropical or tropical mangrove forest, and subtropical or tropical moist montane forest. The females lays one white egg on a platform nest, constructed of leaves and twigs on a trees branch.

== Distribution ==
This species is found in the forest of northwestern and eastern areas of Madagascar and is considered to be common.

== Status and conservation ==
This species is reported to be common in suitable habitat and its population trend appears stable. The International Union for Conservation of Nature (IUCN) has classified the conservation status of this bird as of least concern.
