= Eastern sirystes =

The eastern sirystes has been split into the following species:

- Sibilant sirystes Sirystes sibilator
- White-rumped sirystes Sirystes albocinereus
- Todd's sirystes Sirystes subcanescens
