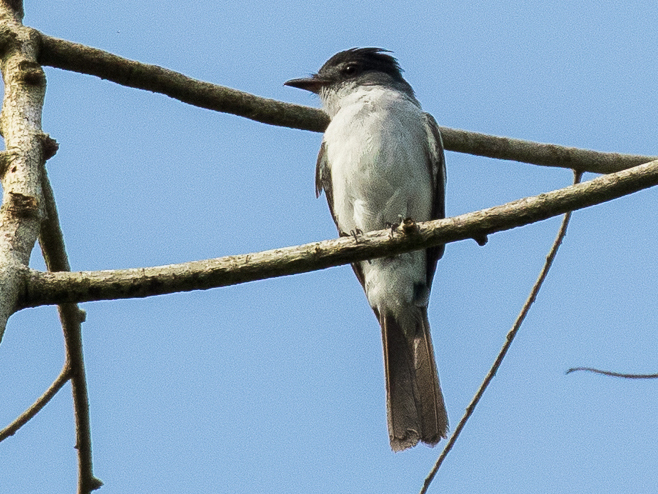

Conservation status
- Least Concern (IUCN 3.1)

Scientific classification
- Kingdom: Animalia
- Phylum: Chordata
- Class: Aves
- Order: Passeriformes
- Family: Tyrannidae
- Genus: Sirystes
- Species: S. albogriseus

Binomial name
- Sirystes albogriseus (Lawrence, 1863)

= Choco sirystes =

Species of bird

The Choco sirystes (Sirystes albogriseus), formerly known as the western sirystes, is a species of passerine bird in the tyrant flycatcher family Tyrannidae. It is found Colombia, Ecuador, and Panama.

== Taxonomy and systematics ==
The Choco sirystes was formally described in 1863 by the American amateur ornithologist George Newbold Lawrence under the binomial name Lipaugus albogriseus, mistakenly placing it with the cotingas. Lawrence did not mention a type locality but Osbert Salvin and Frederick DuCane Godman, in their book Biologia Centrali-Americana, reported that the specimen had come from "Lion Hill". This was a railway station in the Panama Canal Zone that was submerged when the Gatun Lake was created. It was later moved into genus Sirystes that was introduced in 1860 by the German ornithologists Jean Cabanis and Ferdinand Heine.

By the 1930s what is now the Choco sirystes was generally treated as a subspecies of S. sibilator, at that time called simply "sirystes" and now called the sibilant sirystes. By the beginning of the twenty-first century it was again treated by some authors as a full species, the "western sirystes". As a result of a study published in 2013, "sirystes" was split into four species, one of which is Sirystes albogriseus which received its current English name Choco sirystes.

The Choco sirystes' specific epithet combines the Latin albus ("white") with the Medieval Latin griseum meaning "gray".

The Choco sirystes is monotypic.

== Description ==
The Choco sirystes is 17.5 to 19 cm (6.9 to 7.5 in) long and weighs 32 to 36 g (1.1 to 1.3 oz). The sexes have the same plumage. Adults have a black crown with a slight crest. The rest of their face is slate gray. Their nape and back are pale gray, their rump white, and their uppertail coverts dark with white fringes. Their wings are dusky black with wide white edges on the coverts and secondaries. Their tail is dusky with grayish white tips on the feathers. Their throat and upper breast are grayish white that becomes white on the rest of the underparts. They have a dark brown iris, a black bill whose base is sometimes paler, and black or dark gray legs and feet. Juveniles are similar to adults with a faint buffy overall tinge.

== Distribution and habitat ==
The Choco sirystes is found from the Panama Canal Zone and Panamá Province east and south through western Colombia into northwestern Ecuador as far as Los Ríos Province. It mostly inhabits humid primary and mature secondary forests in the tropical and lower subtropical zones, where it usually is found in the canopy but comes lower at the forest edge. In elevation it reaches 1,000 m (3,300 ft) in Panama, 600 m (2,000 ft) in Colombia, and 500 m (1,600 ft) in Ecuador.

== Behavior ==
=== Movement ===
The Choco sirystes is a year-round resident.

=== Feeding ===
The Choco sirystes' diet is not known in detail but includes a variety of insects and also seeds. It often joins mixed-species feeding flocks, taking prey and fruit with sallies from a perch.

=== Breeding ===
The Choco sirystes' breeding season is not known but appears to include February. Nothing else is known about the species' breeding biology.

=== Vocalization ===
The Choco sirystes' most frequent call is "a husky shup-chip-chip or prup-prip-prip-prip". When it is excited it gives "a much faster che-che-che-che-che-che-chut".

== Status ==
The IUCN has assessed the Choco sirystes as being of Least Concern. It has a large range; its estimated population of between 20,000 and 50,000 mature individuals is believed to be decreasing. No immediate threats have been identified. It is considered uncommon in Panama and Colombia and "uncommon and local" in Ecuador.
