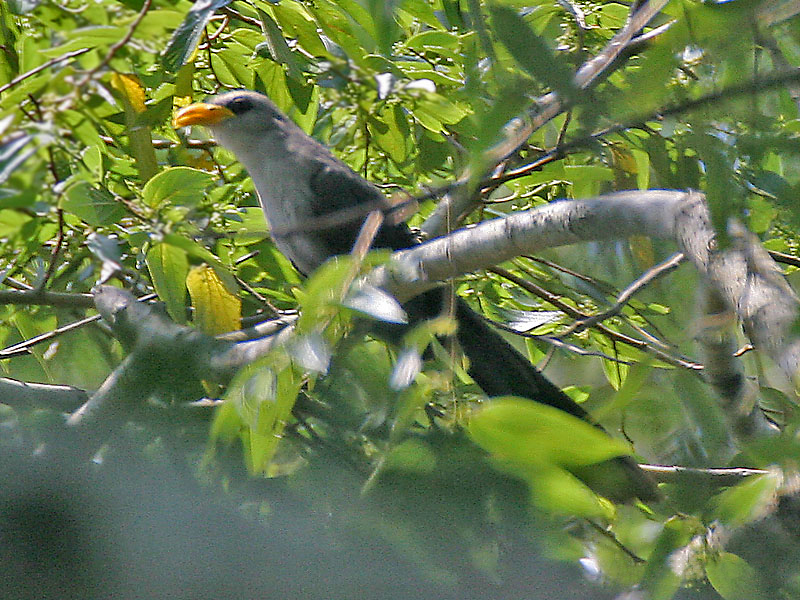

Conservation status
- Least Concern (IUCN 3.1)

Scientific classification
- Kingdom: Animalia
- Phylum: Chordata
- Class: Aves
- Order: Cuculiformes
- Family: Cuculidae
- Genus: Ceuthmochares
- Species: C. australis

Binomial name
- Ceuthmochares australis Sharpe, 1873

= Green malkoha =

Species of bird

The green malkoha or whistling yellowbill (Ceuthmochares australis) is a species of cuckoo in the family Cuculidae. This species and the blue malkoha were previously considered conspecific and together known as the yellowbill.

It has a green tail, wings and back.

It has a widespread distribution down the coast of Eastern Africa from Kenya to South Africa. It ranges from dense forest to riverine forest and forest edges. In the forest it typically lives in the subcanopy at between 8–30 m.

The green malkoha feeds primarily on insects, particularly caterpillars, beetles, grasshoppers and crickets; it will also take frogs, slugs, fruit, seeds and leaves. It moves through the tangled vegetation with a series of small hops, snatching prey as it travels. It will accompany other birds and squirrels, taking the insects flushed by them.

Unlike some other cuckoos the green malkoha is not a brood parasite, instead it cares for its own young. Breeding behaviour has been observed. The male and female face each other, first wagging their tails from side to side, then spreading them. The male also engages in gift giving, presenting the female with prey, then mounting her and feeding her while mounted. Two white and creamy eggs are laid in a nest that is a rough mass of sticks suspended around 2–5 m above the ground. Both parents care for the young.

The green malkoha is an uncommon species and rarely observed due to its secretive behaviour. However it is not considered threatened, and is listed as least concern by the IUCN.
