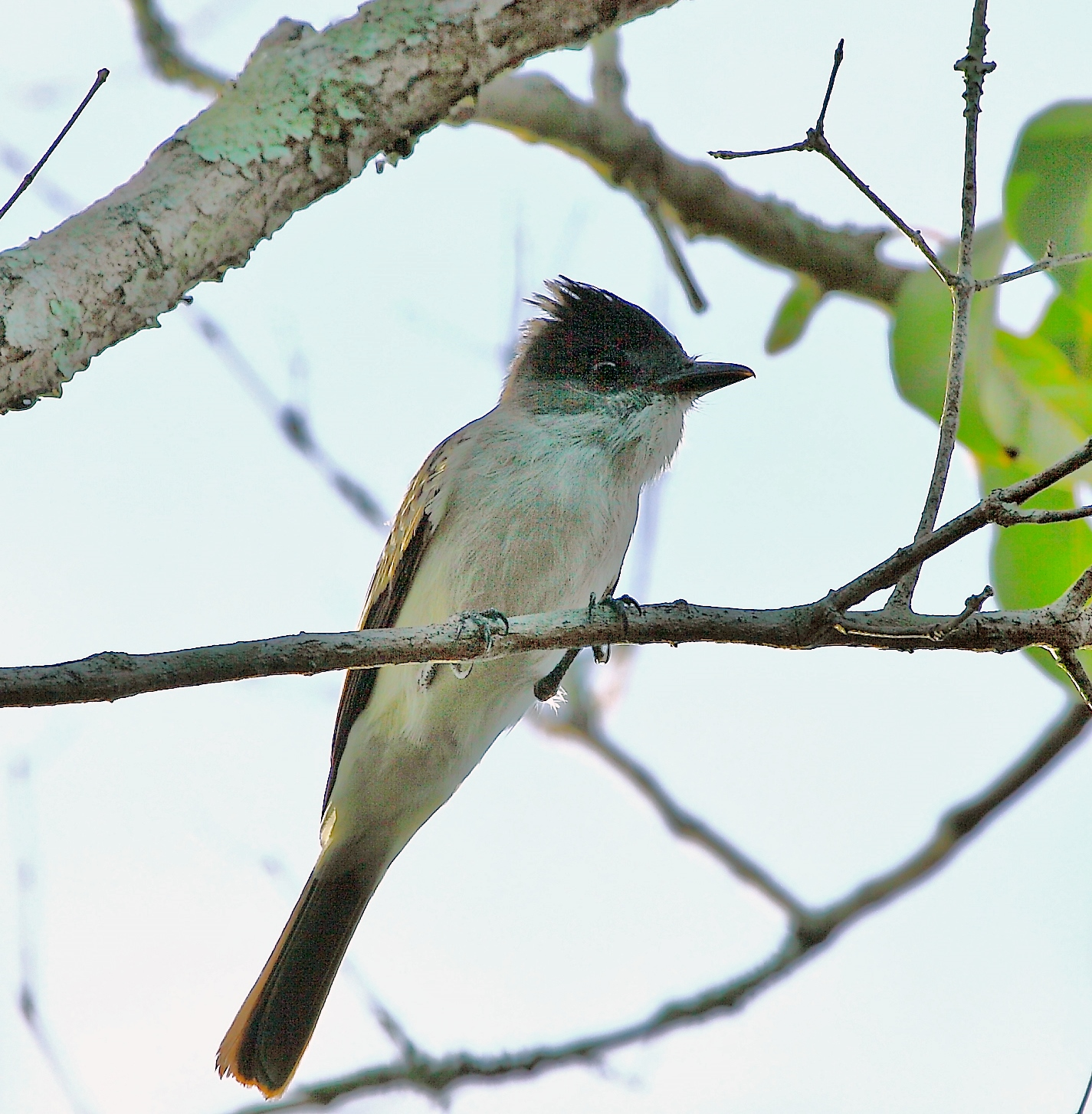
- Sibilant sirystes Sirystes sibilator

Scientific classification
- Kingdom: Animalia
- Phylum: Chordata
- Class: Aves
- Order: Passeriformes
- Family: Tyrannidae
- Genus: Sirystes; Cabanis & Heine, 1860

Type species
- Muscicapa sibilator Vieillot, 1818

= Sirystes =

Genus of birds

Sirystes is a genus of birds in the tyrant flycatcher family, Tyrannidae that are found in Middle and South America. They used to be all considered conspecific. Vocal differences were used to separated the superspecies into four distinct taxa.

== Taxonomy ==
The genus Sirystes was introduced in 1860 by the German ornithologists Jean Cabanis and Ferdinand Heine to accommodate a single species, Muscicapa sibilator Vieillot, 1818, the sibilant sirystes. This is therefore considered to be the type species. The genus name is from Ancient Greek συριστης/suristēs meaning "piper" from συριζω/surizō meaning "to play the pipes". The four species in the genus were formerly all considered to be conspecific. The subspecies were separated based primarily on the differences in their vocalization.

The genus contains four species:

- Sibilant sirystes, Sirystes sibilator
- Choco sirystes, Sirystes albogriseus
- White-rumped sirystes, Sirystes albocinereus
- Todd's sirystes, Sirystes subcanescens
