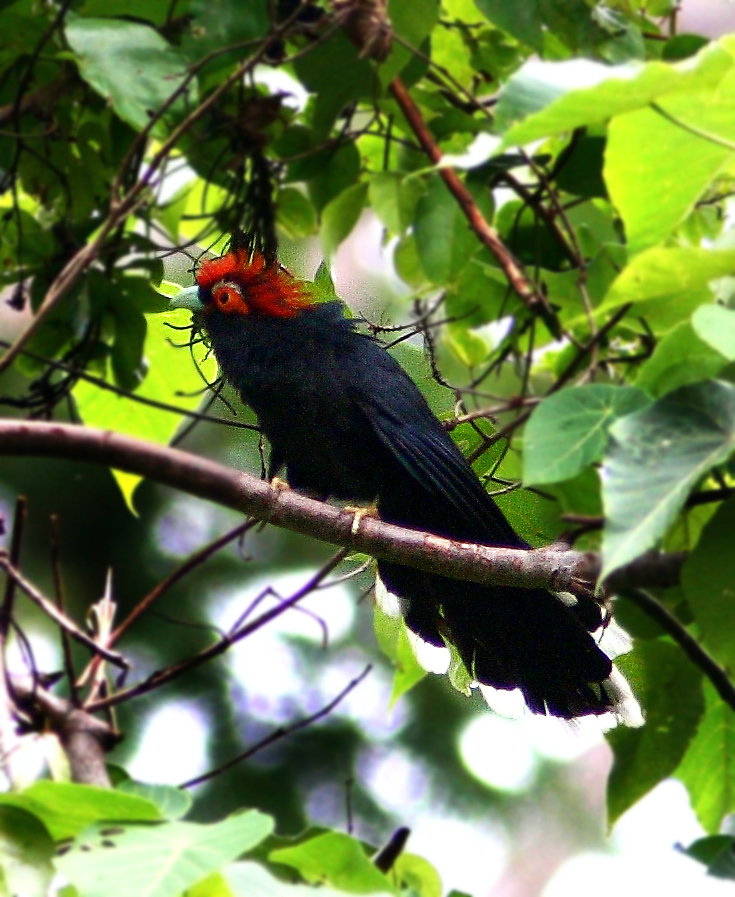

Conservation status
- Least Concern (IUCN 3.1)

Scientific classification
- Kingdom: Animalia
- Phylum: Chordata
- Class: Aves
- Order: Cuculiformes
- Family: Cuculidae
- Genus: Dasylophus
- Species: D. superciliosus

Binomial name
- Dasylophus superciliosus (Dumont, 1823)

Synonyms
- Phaenicophaeus superciliosus

= Rough-crested malkoha =

Species of bird

The rough-crested malkoha (Dasylophus superciliosus) is a species of cuckoo in the family Cuculidae. It is endemic to Luzon Island in the Philippines. Its natural habitat is tropical moist lowland forest. It is declining due to habitat loss and hunting.

== Description and taxonomy ==
It is large, with a long tail and a unique crest. It is sexually monomorphic. Its upperparts, wings, and tail are black with bluish green gloss. Its superciliary, or eyebrow, is composed of long, loosely-webbed red feathers running from its lores to its nape. Its graduated tail feathers are tipped white, and its underparts are black with a dull greenish tinge.

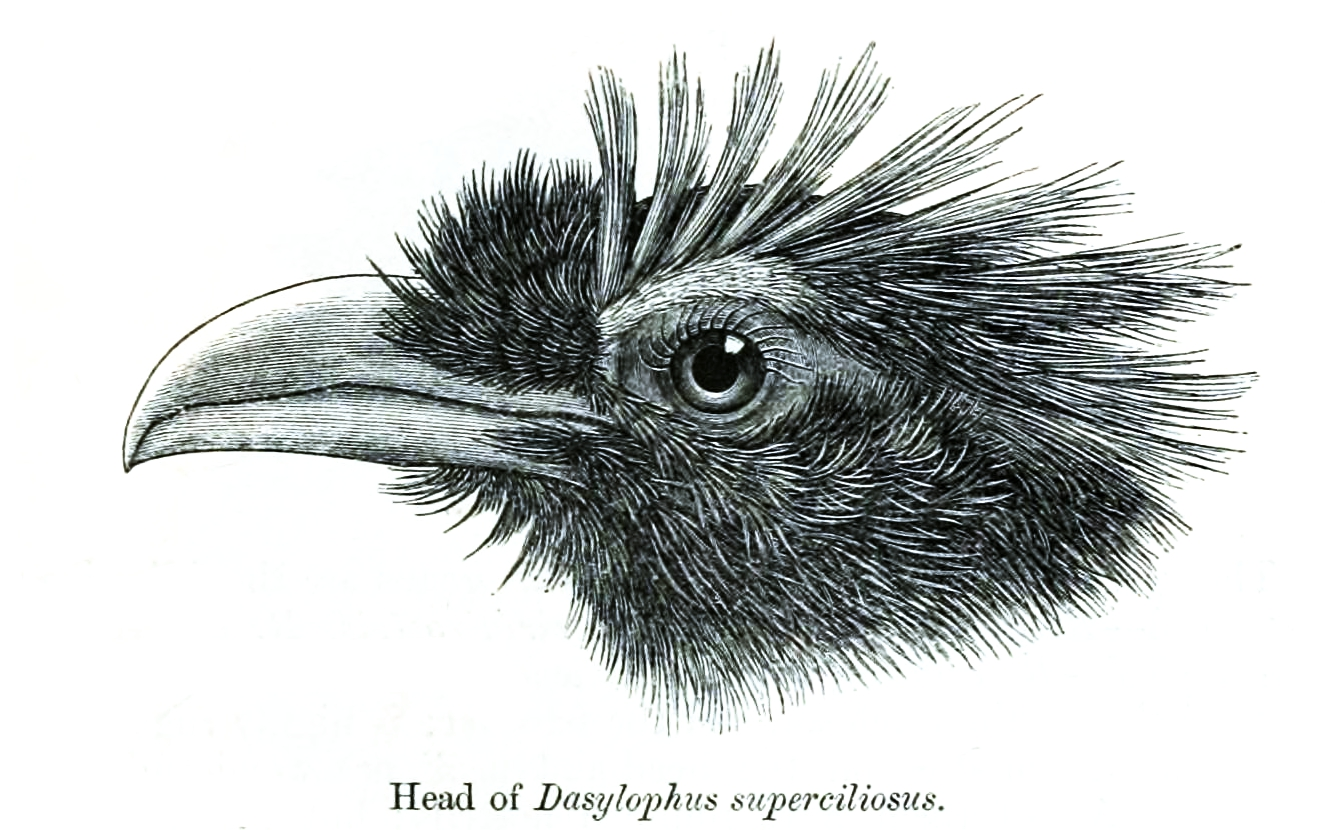
Head feather pattern

=== Subspecies ===
Two subspecies are recognized

- D.s. superciliosus: Southern Luzon; red wattle and longer crest
- D. s. cagayanesis: Northern Luzon; yellow wattle and short crest. Cagayanensis is smaller, with less extensive and shorter superciliary crest and with olive wash on underparts compared to superciliosus.

== Ecology and behavior ==
It feeds on insects, especially favouring caterpillars and small mammals, reptiles and amphibians. Forages in the lower levels and likes climbing vines and tangles. Usually observed alone or in small groups. Not much information on breeding data but believed to breed from May to June. A nest was found to have 3 eggs but not enough data to assume clutch size.

== Habitat and conservation status ==
Its natural habitats are tropical moist lowland forest up to 800 meters above sea level. The IUCN has classified the species as least Concern where it is said to be locally common. However, the population is believed to be declining due to deforestation from land conversion, Illegal logging and slash-and-burn farming.

It is found in multiple protected areas such as Mount Banahaw, Mount Makiling, Mount Isarog, Bataan National Park and Northern Sierra Madre Natural Park but like all areas in the Philippines, protection is lax and deforestation and hunting continues despite this protection on paper.
