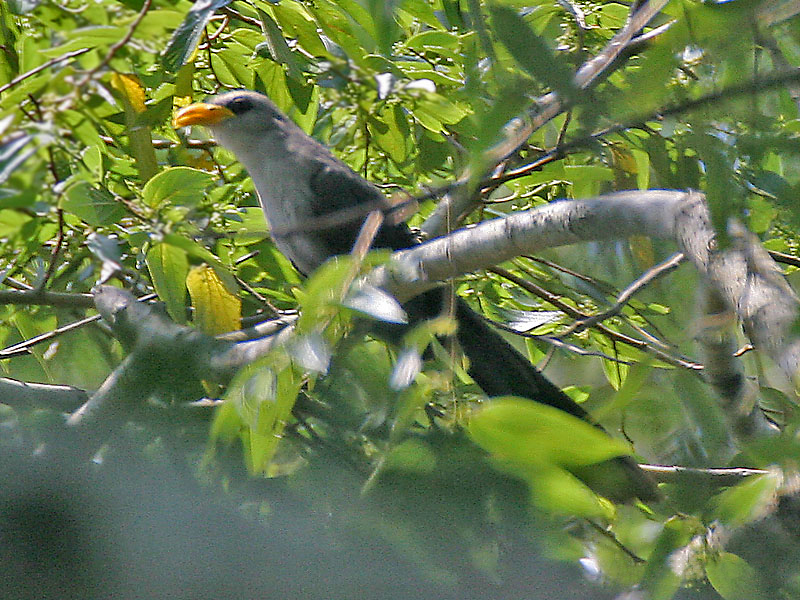
- Green malkoha (Ceuthmochares australis)

Scientific classification
- Kingdom: Animalia
- Phylum: Chordata
- Class: Aves
- Order: Cuculiformes
- Family: Cuculidae
- Genus: Ceuthmochares; Cabanis & Heine, 1863

Type species
- Cuculus aereus Vieillot, 1817

= Ceuthmochares =

Genus of birds

Ceuthmochares is a genus of 2 species of cuckoos in the family Cuculidae. The two species were once treated as a single species, known as the yellowbill. Both species are found in evergreen forest in Africa. Although they are cuckoos they are not brood parasites. This indicates that they do not lay their eggs in the nests of other bird species.

== Species ==
Genus Ceuthmochares – Cabanis & Heine, 1863 – two species
Common name	Scientific name and subspecies	Range	Size and ecology	IUCN status and estimated population
Blue malkoha	Ceuthmochares aereus (Vieillot, 1817) Two subspecies: C. a. flavirostris (Swainson, 1837); C. a. aereus (Vieillot, 1817)	African tropical rainforest	Size: Habitat: Diet:	LC
Green malkoha	Ceuthmochares australis Sharpe, 1873	littoral areas of eastern Africa, from Kenya to South Africa	Size: Habitat: Diet:	LC
