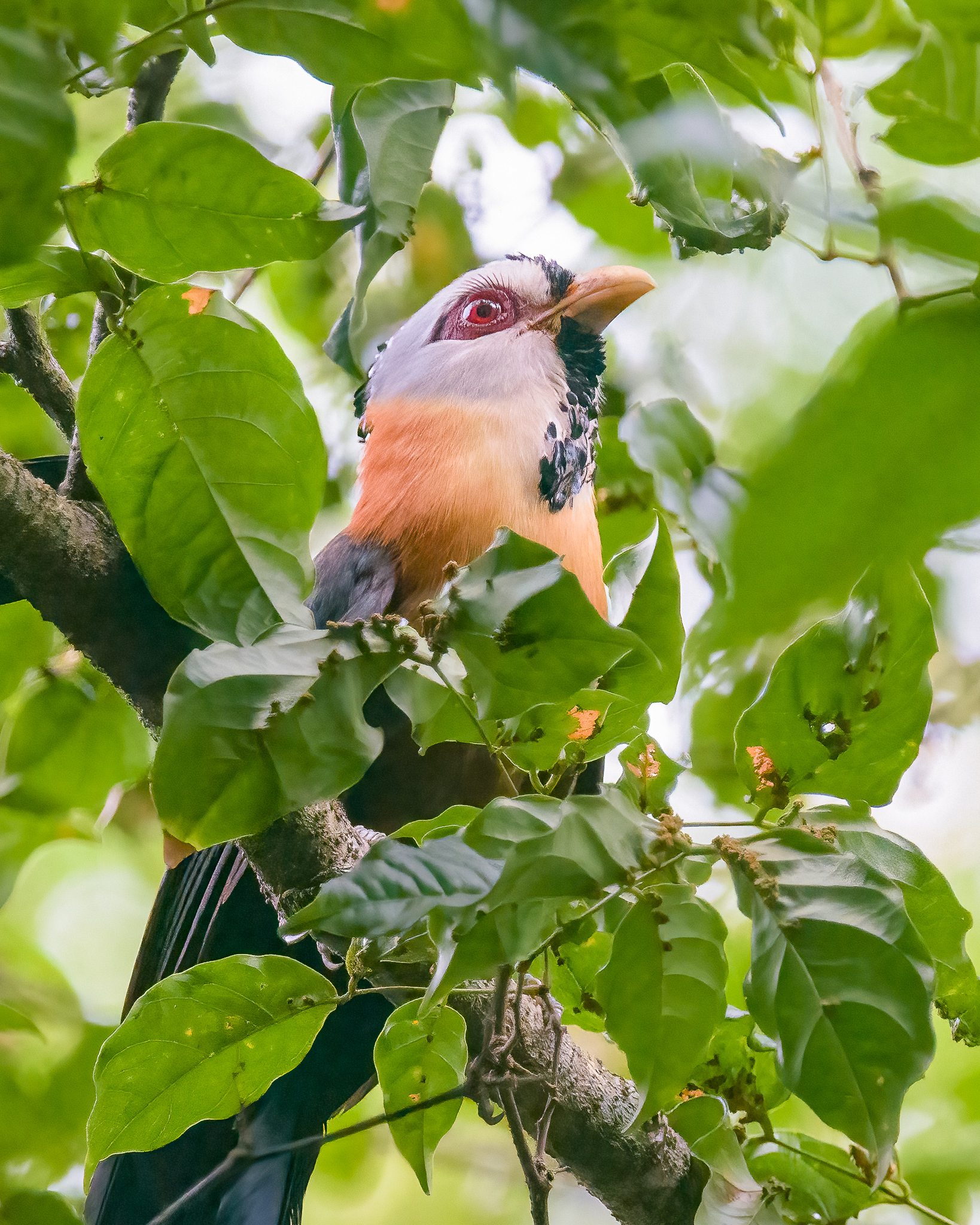

Conservation status
- Least Concern (IUCN 3.1)

Scientific classification
- Kingdom: Animalia
- Phylum: Chordata
- Class: Aves
- Order: Cuculiformes
- Family: Cuculidae
- Genus: Dasylophus
- Species: D. cumingi

Binomial name
- Dasylophus cumingi (Fraser, 1839)

Synonyms
- Phaenicophaeus cumingi Lepidogrammus cumingi

= Scale-feathered malkoha =

Species of bird

The scale-feathered malkoha (Dasylophus cumingi) is a species of cuckoo in the family Cuculidae. It is a spectacular looking bird with its white hood, red eyes and yellowish bill with a line of scaled feathers down from the bill and up over the crown, contrasted with rufous neck and back and a black lower body and tail. It is endemic to the Philippines found only in the islands of Luzon, Catanduanes and Marinduque. The species was named after the collector Hugh Cuming.

== Description and taxonomy ==
Large, with unique plastic-like feathers on head and throat, sexes alike. And whole head grey, almost white on the throat with feather on top of head and Down center of throat to upper breast tipped with black scale-like feathers; upper back forming a continuous bend with chestnut on lower breast; back, wings, and graduated white-tipped tail glossy black on lower belly and under tail coverts.

This species is monotypic.

== Ecology and behavior ==
It feeds on insects, especially favouring caterpillars and small mammals, reptiles and amphibians. Forages in the lower levels and likes climbing vines and tangles. Usually observed alone or in small groups but also joins mixed species flocks. Not much information on breeding data but believed to breed from March to May based on the enlarged gonads of collected specimens during this time period.

== Habitat and conservation status ==
Its natural habitats are tropical moist lowland forest and tropical moist montane forest up to 2,000 meters above sea level although this species seems to be most common in the lower and middle levels of 300 to 760 meters above sea level. The IUCN has classified the species as being of Least Concern where it is said to be locally common. However, the population is believed to be declining due to deforestation from land conversion, Illegal logging and slash-and-burn farming.

It is found in multiple protected areas such as Mount Banahaw, Mount Makiling, Mount Isarog, Bataan National Park and Northern Sierra Madre Natural Park but like all areas in the Philippines, protection is lax and deforestation and hunting continues despite this protection on paper.
