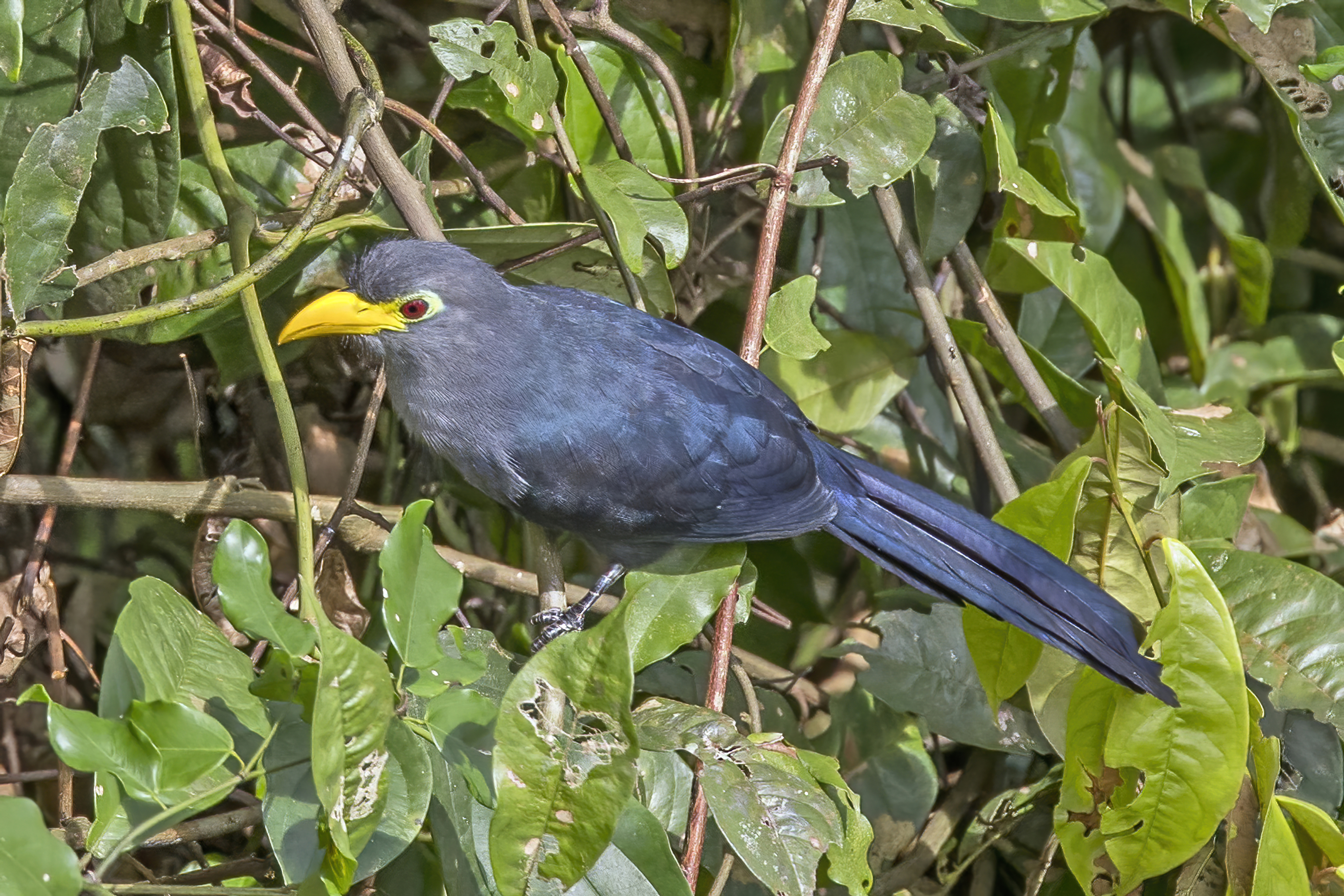
- C. a. flavirostris Ghana

Conservation status
- Least Concern (IUCN 3.1)

Scientific classification
- Kingdom: Animalia
- Phylum: Chordata
- Class: Aves
- Order: Cuculiformes
- Family: Cuculidae
- Genus: Ceuthmochares
- Species: C. aereus

Binomial name
- Ceuthmochares aereus (Vieillot, 1817)

Subspecies
- See text

= Blue malkoha =

Species of bird

The blue malkoha or chattering yellowbill (Ceuthmochares aereus) is a species of cuckoo in the family Cuculidae. It was formerly conspecific with the green malkoha until split in 2016. It is widely distributed across the African tropical rainforest.

== Description ==
The blue malkoha has a greyish belly, head and throat and a heavy yellow bill but subspecies display some differences in plumage colouration. C. aereus aereus has a greenish and blue tail, wings and back, while C. aereus flavirostris has a blue tail, wings and back.

The blue malkoha feeds primarily on insects, particularly caterpillars, beetles, grasshoppers and crickets; it will also take frogs, slugs, fruit, seeds and leaves. It moves through the tangled vegetation with a series of small hops, snatching prey as it travels. It will accompany other birds and squirrels, taking the insects flushed by them.

Unlike some other cuckoos the blue malkoha is not a brood parasite, instead it cares for its own young. Two white and creamy eggs are laid in a nest that is a rough mass of sticks suspended around 2–5 m above the ground. Both parents care for the young.

The blue malkoha is an uncommon species and rarely observed due to its secretive behaviour. However it is not considered threatened, and is listed as least concern by the IUCN.

== Subspecies ==
The blue malkoha has two subspecies:

- C. a. flavirostris (Swainson, 1837) - Gambia to southwest Nigeria
- C. a. aereus (Vieillot, 1817) - Nigeria to western Kenya, northern Zambia and Angola, Bioko
