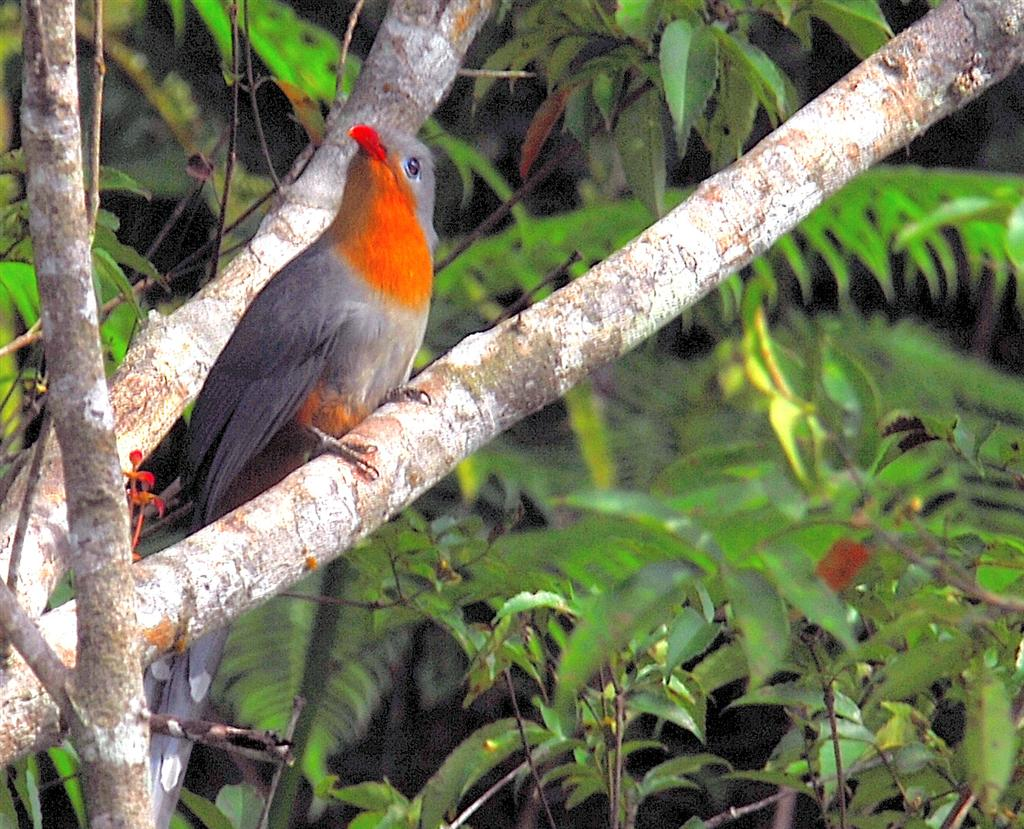

Conservation status
- Least Concern (IUCN 3.1)

Scientific classification
- Kingdom: Animalia
- Phylum: Chordata
- Class: Aves
- Order: Cuculiformes
- Family: Cuculidae
- Genus: Zanclostomus; Swainson, 1837
- Species: Z. javanicus

Binomial name
- Zanclostomus javanicus (Horsfield, 1821)

Synonyms
- Phaenicophaeus javanicus

= Red-billed malkoha =

Species of bird

The red-billed malkoha (Zanclostomus javanicus) is a species of cuckoo in the family Cuculidae. It is found in Brunei, Indonesia, Malaysia, Myanmar, and Thailand. Its natural habitat is subtropical or tropical dry forests.

The genus Zanclostomus was introduced in 1837 by the English naturalist William Swainson to accommodate the red-billed malkoha. The genus name combines the Ancient Greek zanklon meaning "sickle" or "reaping hook" with stoma meaning "mouth".

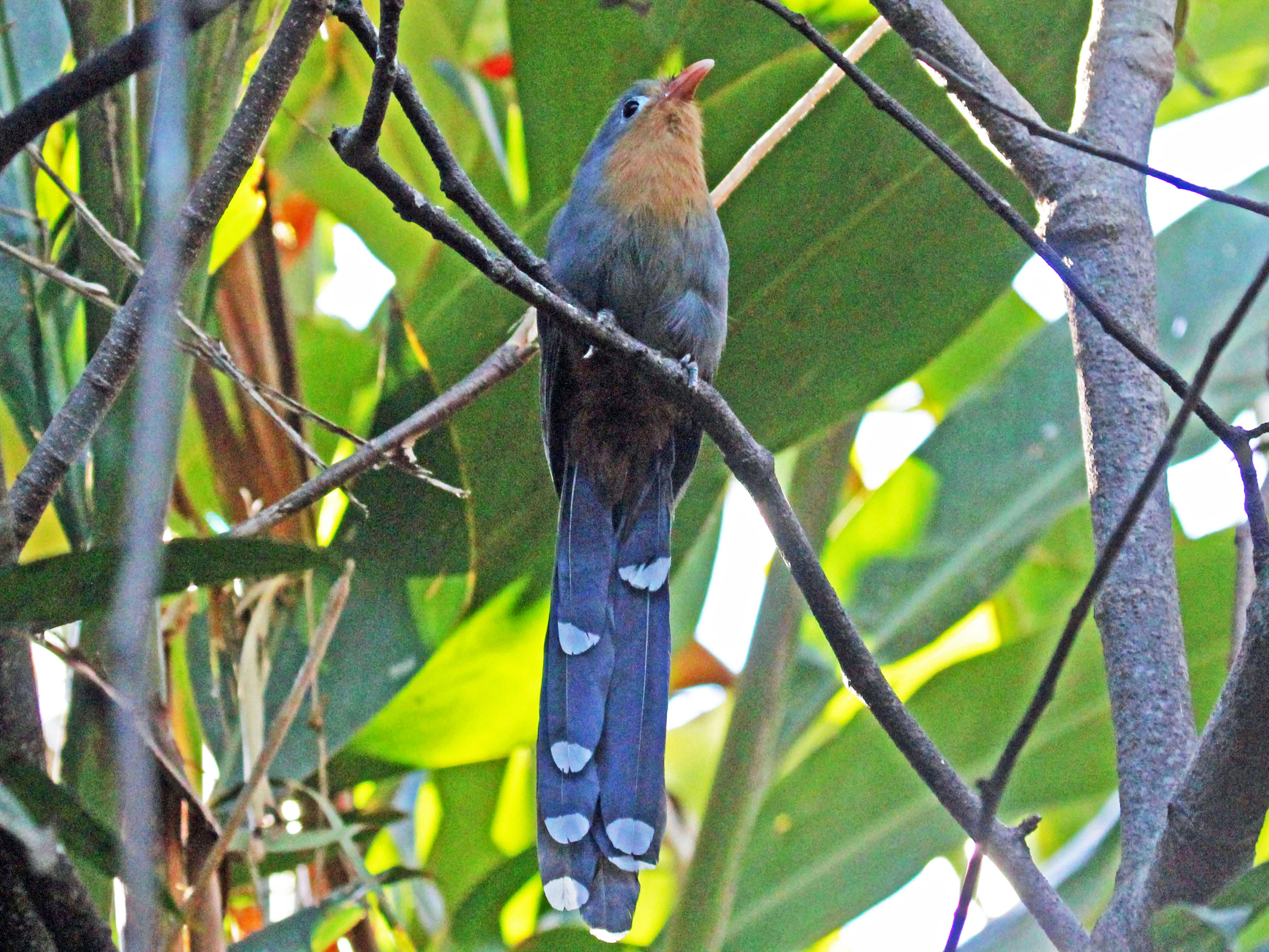
At San Diego Zoo
