= Eocuculus =

Eocuculus Temporal range: Oligocene

Scientific classification
- Domain: Eukaryota
- Kingdom: Animalia
- Phylum: Chordata
- Class: Aves
- Order: Cuculiformes
- Family: Cuculidae
- Genus: †Eocuculus; Chandler, 1999
- Species: †E. cherpinae

Binomial name
- †Eocuculus cherpinae Chandler, 1999

Extinct species of bird

Eocuculus cherpinae is a prehistoric bird, known from postcranial remains from the late Eocene Florissant beds in Colorado.
