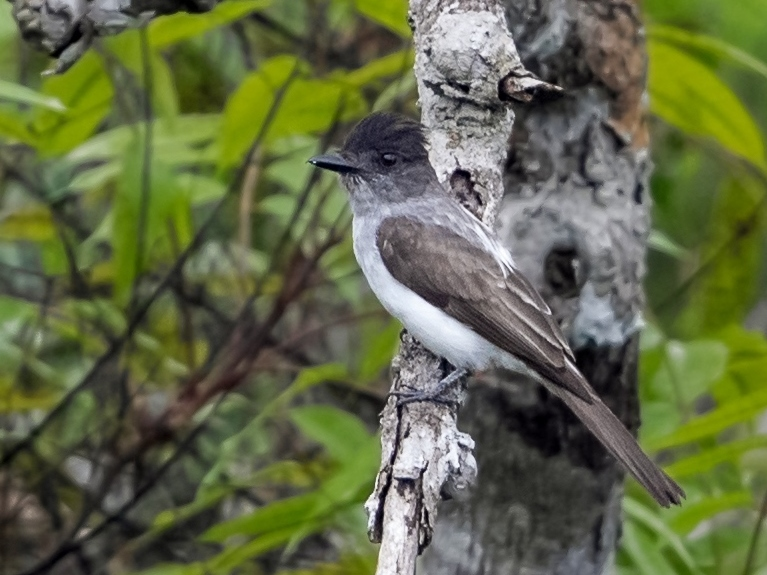

Conservation status
- Least Concern (IUCN 3.1)

Scientific classification
- Kingdom: Animalia
- Phylum: Chordata
- Class: Aves
- Order: Passeriformes
- Family: Tyrannidae
- Genus: Sirystes
- Species: S. subcanescens

Binomial name
- Sirystes subcanescens Todd, 1920

= Todd's sirystes =

Species of bird

Todd's sirystes (Sirystes subcanescens) is a species of bird in the family Tyrannidae, the tyrant flycatchers. It is found in Brazil, French Guiana, Guyana, and Suriname.

== Taxonomy and systematics ==
Todd's sirystes was originally described as Sirystes albocinereus subcanescens, a subspecies of the white-rumped sirystes. By the 1930s both were generally treated as subspecies of S. sibilator, at that time called simply "sirystes" and now called the sibilant sirystes. As a result of a study published in 2013, "sirystes" was split into four species, one of which is Todd's sirystes.

Todd's sirystes is monotypic.

== Description ==
Todd's sirystes is 18 to 18.5 cm (7.1 to 7.3 in) long and weighs 34 to 36.5 g (1.2 to 1.3 oz). The sexes have the same plumage. Adults have a black crown with a slight crest. The rest of their face is slate gray. Their nape and back are mottled medium gray with a large white rump patch. Their wings are blackish with gray edges on the coverts and white edges on the inner flight feathers. Their tail is long, blackish, and has a square tip. Their throat and breast are gray that becomes white on the belly. They have a dark brown iris, a black bill, and black or gray legs and feet.

== Distribution and habitat ==
Todd's sirystes is found across the Guianas and northern Brazil north of the Amazon from the Rio Negro east to the Atlantic in Pará. It inhabits the canopy of primary and secondary forests. In elevation it ranges from sea level to 1,000 m (3,300 ft).

== Behavior ==
=== Movement ===
Todd's sirystes is a year-round resident.

=== Feeding ===
The diet of Todd's sirystes is not known in detail but is primarily insects. Its foraging behavior has not been described but is believed to be similar to that of the sibilant sirystes, which see here.

=== Breeding ===
Nothing is known about the breeding biology of Todd's sirystes, though it is assumed to nest in cavities in trees like others of its genus.

=== Vocalization ===
Todd's sirystes typically gives a series of wheer whistles though sometimes gives only single notes. It also gives a "chattering song" written as "wuh-wíwi-wuh".

== Status ==
The IUCN has assessed Todd's sirystes as being of Least Concern. It has a large range; its population size is not known and is believed to be decreasing. No immediate threats have been identified. It is "locally not uncommon" in Brazil's Amazonas state but very rare in Pará, scarce in Guyana, and uncommon in Suriname and French Guiana. It does occur in several protected areas both public and private.
