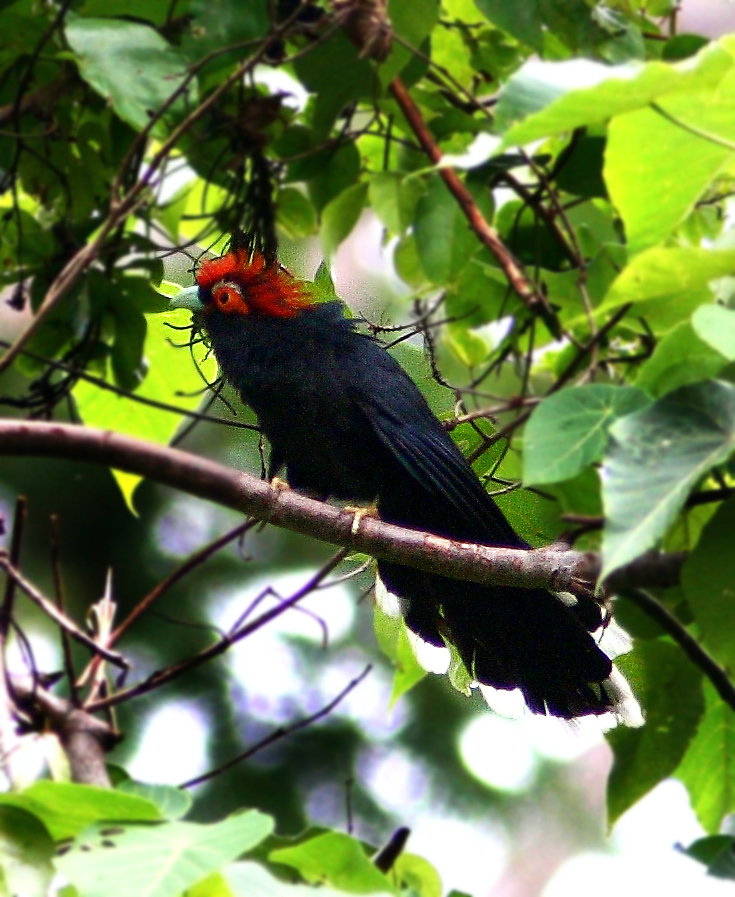
- Rough-crested malkoha (Dasylophus superciliosus)

Scientific classification
- Kingdom: Animalia
- Phylum: Chordata
- Class: Aves
- Order: Cuculiformes
- Family: Cuculidae
- Genus: Dasylophus; Swainson, 1837

Type species
- Phaenicophaus superciliosus Dumont, 1823

= Dasylophus =

Genus of birds

Dasylophus is a genus of 2 species of cuckoos in the family Cuculidae. Both species are found in forests in the Philippines.

== Species ==
Genus Dasylophus – Swainson, 1837 – two species
Common name	Scientific name and subspecies	Range	Size and ecology	IUCN status and estimated population
Rough-crested malkoha	Dasylophus superciliosus (Dumont, 1823) Two subspecies: D. s. superciliosus; D. s. cagayanesis	north Philippines	Size: Habitat: Diet:	LC
Scale-feathered malkoha	Dasylophus cumingi (Fraser, 1839)	north Philippines (Luzon, Marinduque and Catanduanes)	Size: Habitat: Diet:	LC
