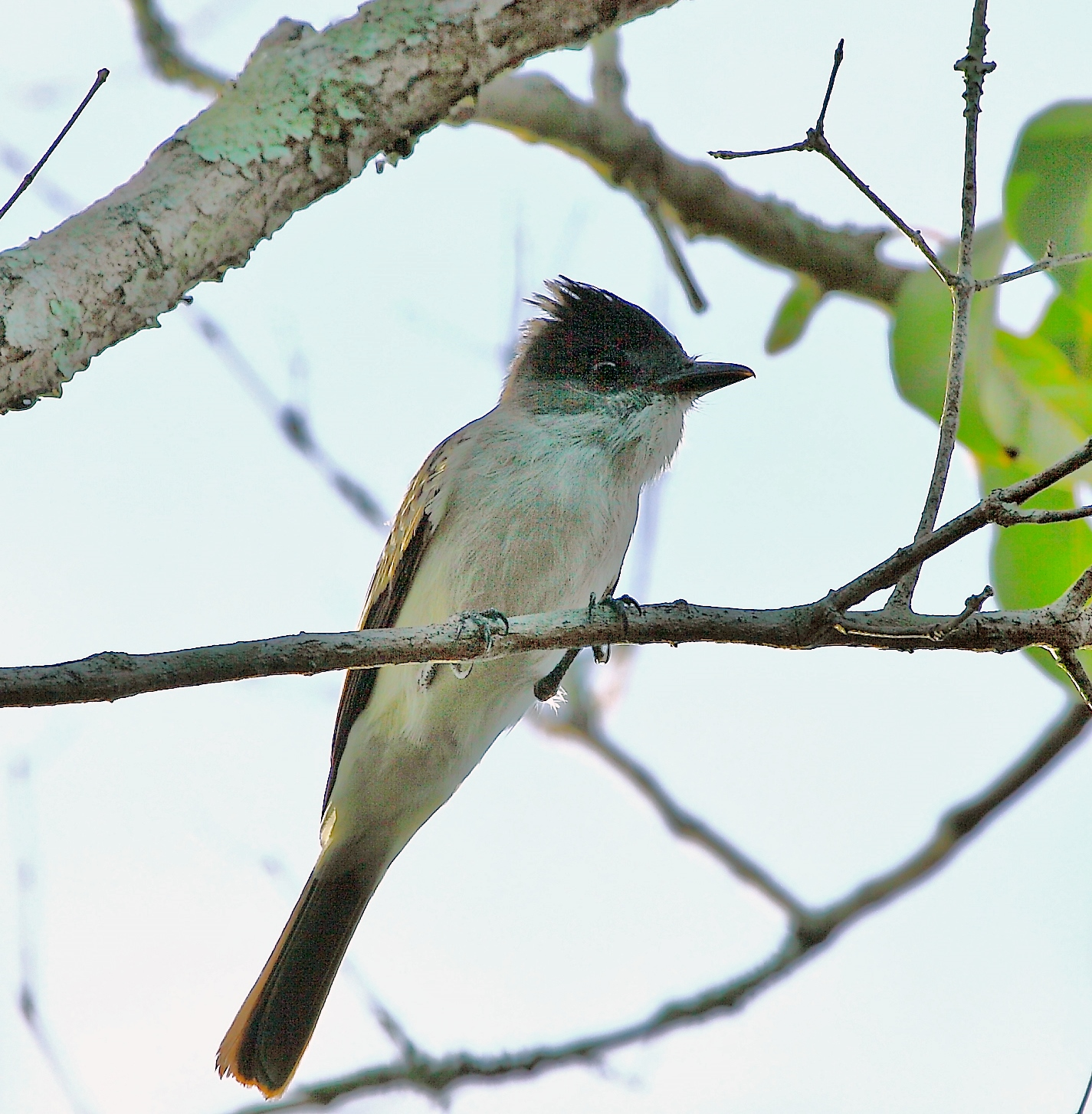
- At Bonito, Mato Grosso do Sul, Brazil

Conservation status
- Least Concern (IUCN 3.1)

Scientific classification
- Kingdom: Animalia
- Phylum: Chordata
- Class: Aves
- Order: Passeriformes
- Family: Tyrannidae
- Genus: Sirystes
- Species: S. sibilator

Binomial name
- Sirystes sibilator (Vieillot, 1818)

= Sibilant sirystes =

Species of bird

The sibilant sirystes (Sirystes sibilator) is a species of bird in the family Tyrannidae, the tyrant flycatchers. It is found in Argentina, Bolivia, Brazil, and Paraguay.

== Taxonomy and systematics ==
The sibilant sirystes was originally described as Muscicapa sibilator, mistakenly placing it with the Old World flycatchers. In 1860 the genus Sirystes was erected for it. Some authors included the genus in family Cotingidae but by the 1930s it was placed in its current family. The sibilant sirystes was eventually expanded by what are now the white-rumped sirystes (S. albocinereus) and Todd's sirystes (S. subcanescens); some systems also included what is now the Choco sirystes (S. albogriseus). The combined species was simply called "sirystes". As a result of a study published in 2013, "sirystes" was split into four species.

The sibilant sirystes has two subspecies, the nominate S. s. sibilator (Vieillot, 1818) and S. s. atimastus (Oberholser, 1902).

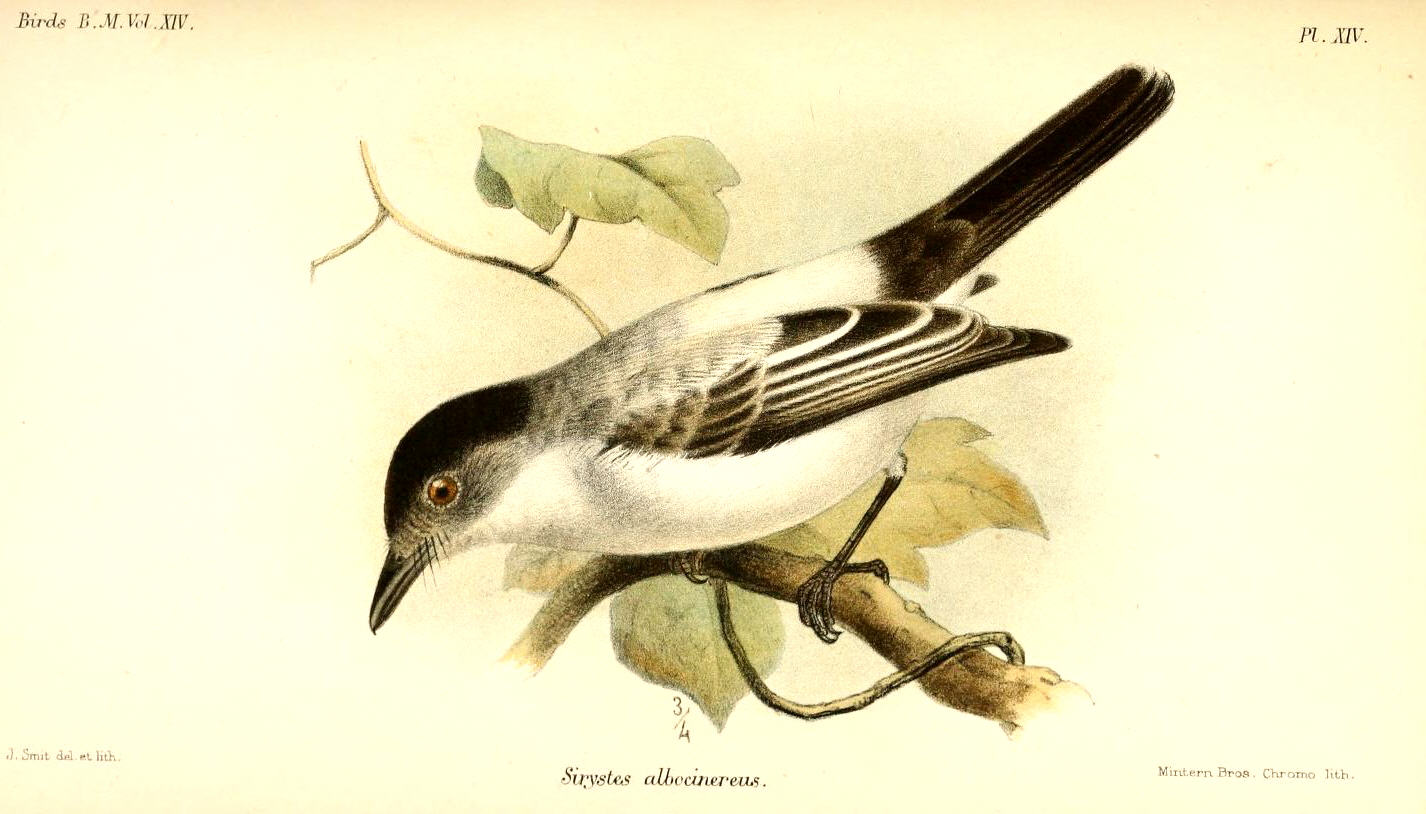
Sirystes sibilator illustration by Joseph Smit, 1888

== Description ==
The sibilant sirystes is 18 to 18.5 cm (7.1 to 7.3 in) long and weighs about 26 to 28 g (0.92 to 0.99 oz). The sexes have the same plumage. Adults of the nominate subspecies have a black crown with a slight crest. The rest of their face is slate gray. Their nape and back are mottled gray with an olivaceous cast in most individuals and their rump has a gray wash, with white tips in the northern part of its range. Their wings are blackish with wide gray edges on the coverts and inner flight feathers. Their tail is long, blackish, and has a square tip. Their throat and breast are gray that becomes grayish white on the belly. Subspecies S. s. atimastus has yellowish tips on the rump feathers, a pale ashy throat, and a white breast and belly. However, the differences between the two subspecies appear to be clinal. Juveniles resemble adults with a faint overall buffy wash. Both subspecies have a dark reddish brown iris, a black bill, and blackish legs and feet.

== Distribution and habitat ==
The nominate subspecies of the sibilant sirystes has by far the larger range. It is found in Brazil in an area roughly bounded by central Amazonas and northeastern Pará, narrowing southward through Mato Grosso and Goiás, and then widening east to Minas Gerais and Espírito Santo and continuing south to northern Rio Grande do Sul. Its range continues into eastern Paraguay and northern Argentina to northeastern Corrientes Province. It also occurs as a non-breeder in Bolivia. Subspecies S. s. atimastus is found only in the vicinity of Chapada dos Guimarães in Mato Grosso.

The sibilant sirystes inhabits several forested landscapes including primary forest, mature secondary woodland, riparian forest, and dry cerradão forest. It almost always keeps to the forest canopy. In elevation it reaches at least 1,000 m (3,300 ft) in Brazil but may occur as high as 1,400 m (4,600 ft).

== Behavior ==
=== Movement ===
The sibilant sirystes is a year-round resident in most of its range. It appears to move from Rio Grande do Sul between June and August. It is present in Bolivia only during the non-breeding season.

=== Feeding ===
The sibilant sirystes feeds primarily on large insects and includes some fruit in its diet. It typically forages in pairs and readily joins mixed-species feeding flocks; in some areas it is the flock leader. It tends to forage over a wide area. It perches in a treetop and takes prey and fruit with a sally to grab it from vegetation; sometimes it takes them during a brief hover.

=== Breeding ===
The sibilant sirystes' breeding season has not been defined but includes August to October in far southern Brazil. Nothing else is known about the species' breeding biology.

=== Vocalization ===
The sibilant sirystes' principle vocalization is a "[l]oud ringing wheer-péw [that is]sometimes lengthened into excited-sounding series, wheer-pe-pe-pew-pew-péw". Both subspecies also give "a long, flat whistling alarm call and a fast trill of unknown context".

== Status ==
The IUCN has assessed the sibilant sirystes as being of Least Concern. It has a large range; its population size is not known and is believed to be decreasing. No immediate threats have been identified. It is considered generally uncommon to fairly common and locally common. It is found in many national parks and preserves. "[L]ocal extinctions [are] reported in [southeastern Brazil], the species being particularly susceptible to forest loss and fragmentation, and disappears following fires."
