= Ferdinand Heine (junior) =

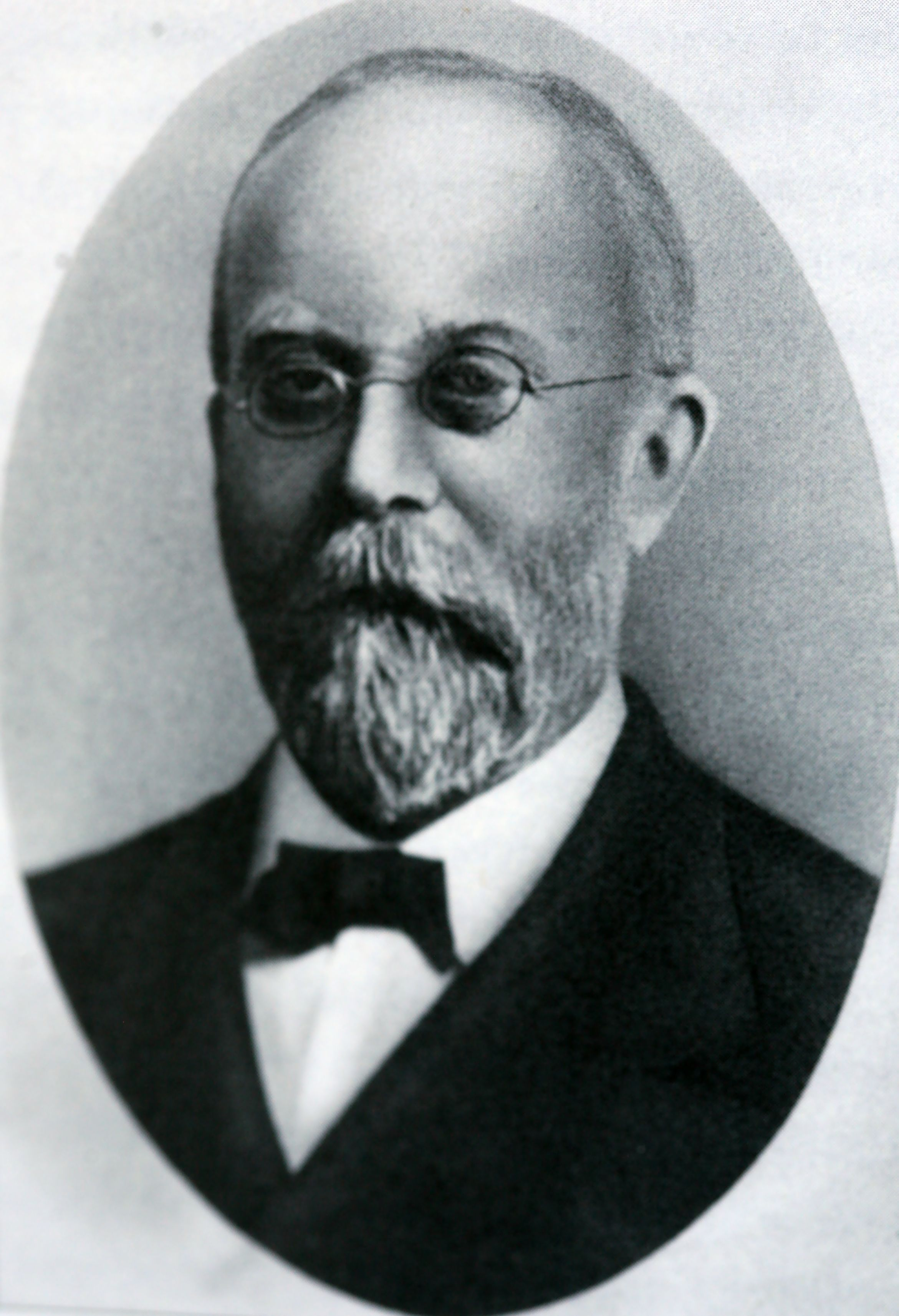

Jakob Gottlieb Ferdinand Heine (9 February 1840 – 12 February 1920) was a German ornithologist, agronomist and plant-breeder. Heine was the eldest son of ornithologist Ferdinand Heine (1809–1894).

Heine was born in Halberstadt, the eldest of eight children of Julie (1823–78) and Ferdinand Heine. He was educated at the Halberstadt cathedral high school and took an interest in birds from his father. He studied ornithology at Heidelberg briefly but was conscripted into the Prussian army in 1863 and took part in the Battle of Königgrätz. He then obtained an education in agriculture at Mansfeld before taking up the management of his father's estate from 1871. He married Elisabeth Rimpau in 1869. After the Franco-German War he began to breed potato varieties and producing their seeds for cultivation. He was inspired by the work of Pierre Louis François Levéque de Vilmorin. He began to collect sugar beets and breed them from 1879. He established breeding of wheat, barley and oats at Hadmersleben in Magdeburg. This was later incorporated as the seed company F. Heine & Co., Hadmersleben. He helped found the German Agricultural Society. Along with Jean Cabanis he catalogued the contents of the museum, Museum Heineanum, of his father.
