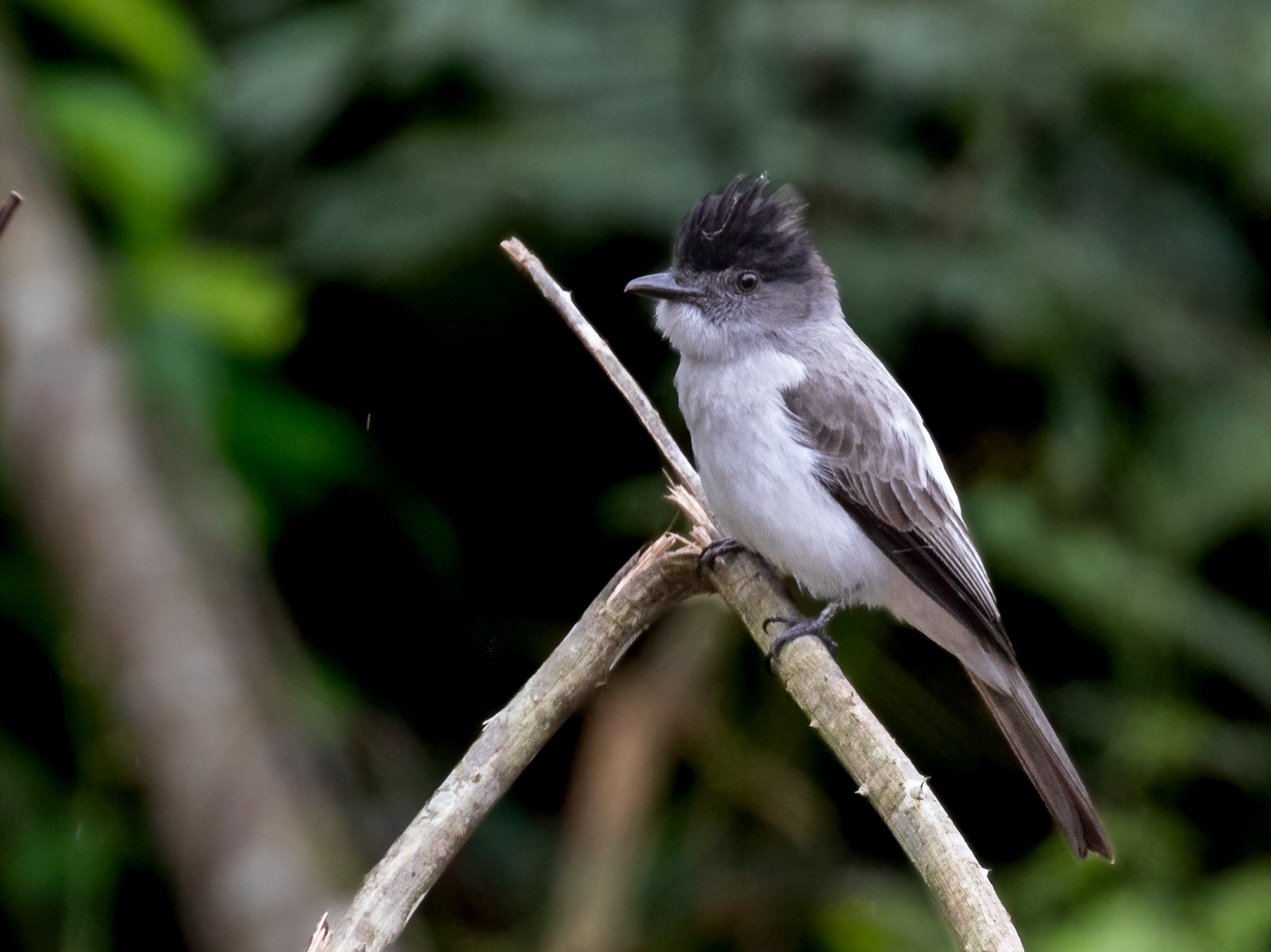

Conservation status
- Least Concern (IUCN 3.1)

Scientific classification
- Kingdom: Animalia
- Phylum: Chordata
- Class: Aves
- Order: Passeriformes
- Family: Tyrannidae
- Genus: Sirystes
- Species: S. albocinereus

Binomial name
- Sirystes albocinereus Sclater, PL & Salvin, 1880

= White-rumped sirystes =

Species of bird

The white-rumped sirystes (Sirystes albocinereus), is a species of bird in the family Tyrannidae, the tyrant flycatchers. It is found in Bolivia, Brazil, Colombia, Ecuador, Peru, and Venezuela.

== Taxonomy and systematics ==
The white-rumped sirystes was originally described as a species with its current binomial Sirystes albocinereus. By the 1930s it was generally treated as a subspecies of S. sibilator, at that time called simply "sirystes" and now called the sibilant sirystes. As a result of a study published in 2013, "sirystes" was split into four species, returning S. albocinereus to species status.

The white-rumped sirystes is monotypic.

== Description ==
The white-rumped sirystes is 18 to 19 cm (7.1 to 7.5 in) long and weighs 24 to 32 g (0.85 to 1.1 oz). The sexes have the same plumage. Adults have a black crown with a slight crest. The rest of their face is slate gray. Their nape and back are mottled gray with a large white rump patch. Their wings are blackish with pale gray edges on the coverts and white edges on the inner flight feathers. Their tail is long, blackish, and has a square tip. Their throat and breast are pale gray that becomes white on the belly. They have a coffee-brown iris, a black bill, and blackish legs and feet.

== Distribution and habitat ==
The white-rumped sirystes is found from southwestern Venezuela south along the base of Colombia's Eastern Andes through eastern Ecuador, eastern Peru, and far western Brazil into northern Bolivia to northern Santa Cruz Department. It primarily inhabits the canopy and edges of humid várzea forest, riparian forest, and the transitions between them and other forest types. In Bolivia it also occurs in dry and semi-deciduous forest. In elevation it reaches 600 m (2,000 ft) in Colombia, 400 m (1,300 ft) in Ecuador, and 700 m (2,300 ft) in Peru.

== Behavior ==
=== Movement ===
The white-rumped sirystes is a year-round resident.

=== Feeding ===
The white-rumped sirystes's diet is thought to be primarily large arthropods. It typically forages singly or in pairs and frequently joins mixed-species feeding flocks, and probably forages over a wide area. It perches erect and mostly takes prey from twigs while briefly hovering after a sally.

=== Breeding ===
The white-rumped sirystes' breeding season has not been established but includes October in Peru. Its one known nest was in a natural cavity in a tree about 32 m (105 ft) above the ground. It apparently held a nestling that both parents provisioned. Nothing else is known about the species' breeding biology.

=== Vocalization ===
One song of the white-rumped sirystes's is "a mellow series of whistles, e.g. p'weer PEW-pu". Another is a chattering "wheer-pi'pi'pi'pi'pi'pi'". Its calls include a "variable series of pew notes", "quieter kew or pew" notes, and "a whistle, followed immediately by a short note wher-péw".

== Status ==
The IUCN has assessed the white-rumped sirystes as being of Least Concern. It has a large range; its population size is not known and is believed to be decreasing. No immediate threats have been identified. It is known in Venezuela only from a few specimens. It is considered uncommon in Colombia and Ecuador and "relatively uncommon" in Peru. It occurs in several protected areas both public and private.
