= Ferdinand Heine =

German ornithologist and collector

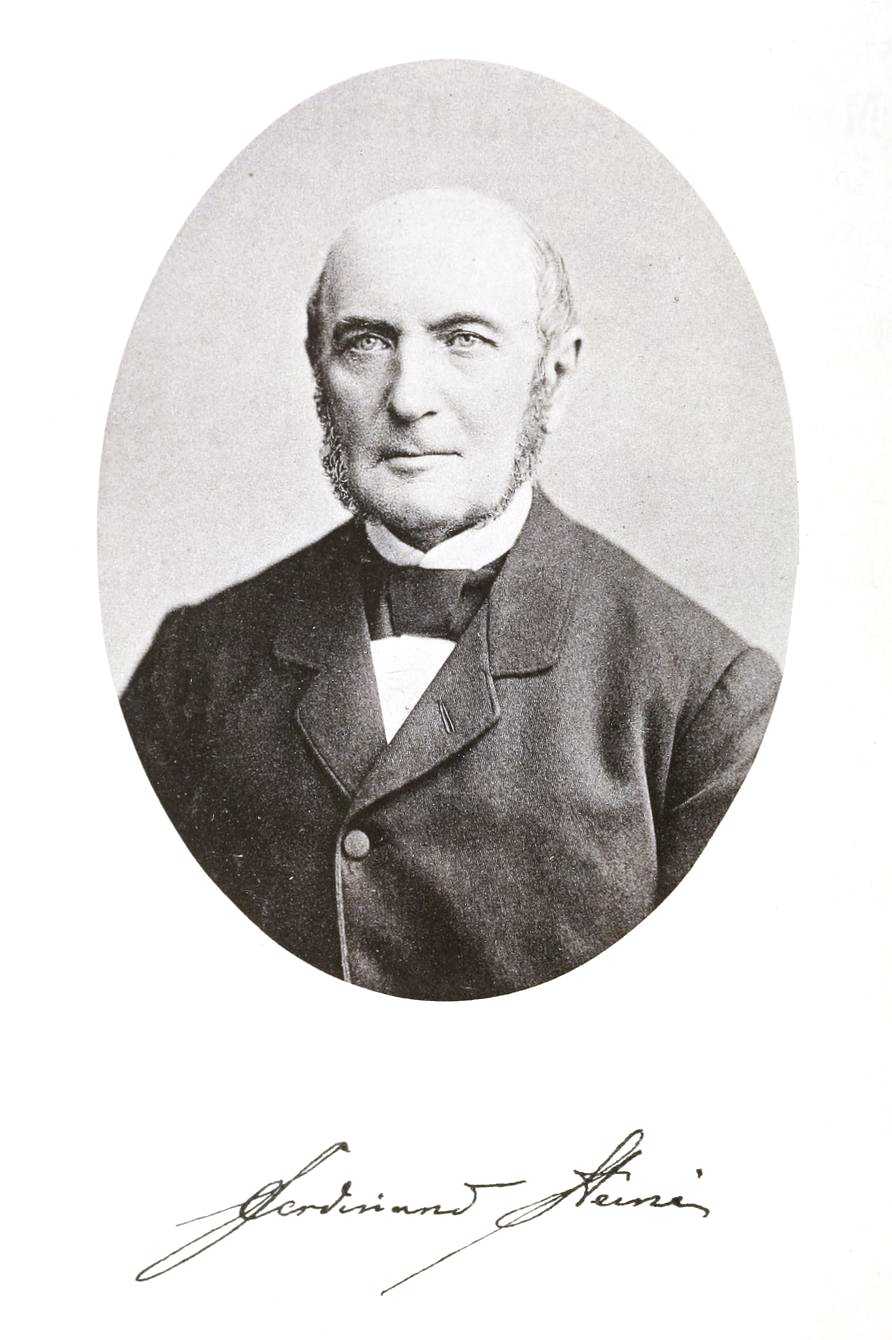

Jakob Gottlieb Ferdinand Heine (9 March 1809 in Halberstadt – 28 March 1894) was a German ornithologist and collector.

Heine had one of the largest private collection of birds in the mid-19th century. The collection now housed at the Heineanum Halberstadt Museum in Halberstadt (27,000 specimens, 15,000 books). Jean Cabanis wrote about the collection in Museum Heineanum. Verzeichniss der ornithologischen Sammlung des Oberamtmann Ferdinand Heine, auf Gut St. Burchard vor Halberstadt (4 volumes, 1850–63). His son Ferdinand Heine (1840-1920) was also an ornithologist.

== Eponymy ==
- Calandrella heinei; Homeyer, 1873.
- Clytorhynchus vitiensis heinei; Finsch & Hartlaub, 1870.
- Tangara heinei (Black-capped tanager) Cabanis, 1850.
- Zoothera heinei (Russet-tailed thrush) Cabanis, 1850.
