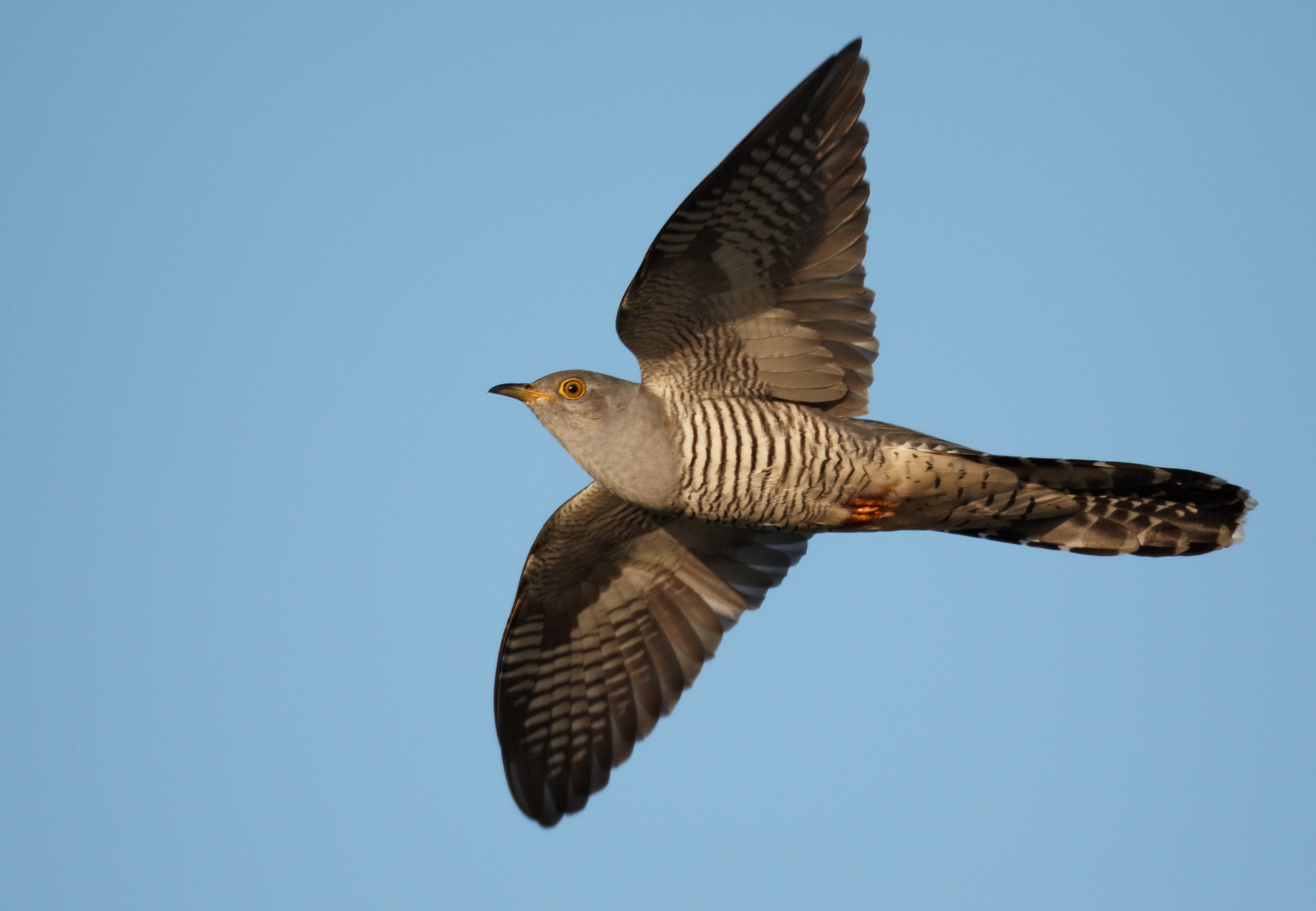
- Common cuckoo (Cuculus canorus)

Scientific classification
- Kingdom: Animalia
- Phylum: Chordata
- Class: Aves
- Clade: Otidimorphae
- Order: Cuculiformes; Wagler, 1830
- Family: Cuculidae; Leach, 1819

Type genus
- Cuculus Linnaeus, 1758

Genera
- 33 genera, see text

= Cuckoo =

Cuckoos Temporal range: Eocene - Holocene, 34–0 Ma

Family of birds

Cuckoos and roadrunners are birds in the family Cuculidae, the sole taxon in the order Cuculiformes. The cuckoo family includes the common cuckoo, roadrunners, koels, malkohas, couas, coucals, and anis. The coucals and anis are sometimes separated as distinct families, the Centropodidae and Crotophagidae, respectively. The cuckoo order Cuculiformes is one of three that make up the Otidimorphae, the other two being the turacos and the bustards. The family Cuculidae contains 150 species, which are divided into 33 genera.

The cuckoos are generally medium-sized, slender birds. Most species live in trees, though a sizeable minority are ground-dwelling. The family has a cosmopolitan distribution; the majority of species are tropical. Some species are migratory, including all those breeding in cooler temperate climates. The cuckoos feed on insects, insect larvae, and a variety of other animals, as well as fruit. Some species (for example, the majority of cuckoo species living in Eurasia) are brood parasites, laying their eggs in the nests of other species and giving rise to the terms "cuckoo's egg" and "cuckold" as metaphors. However, most species raise their own young.

Cuckoos have played a role in human culture for thousands of years, appearing in Greek mythology as sacred to the goddess Hera. In Europe, the cuckoo is associated with spring, and with cuckoldry, for example in Shakespeare's Love's Labour's Lost. In India, cuckoos are sacred to Kamadeva, the god of desire and longing, whereas in Japan, the cuckoo symbolises unrequited love.

== Description ==
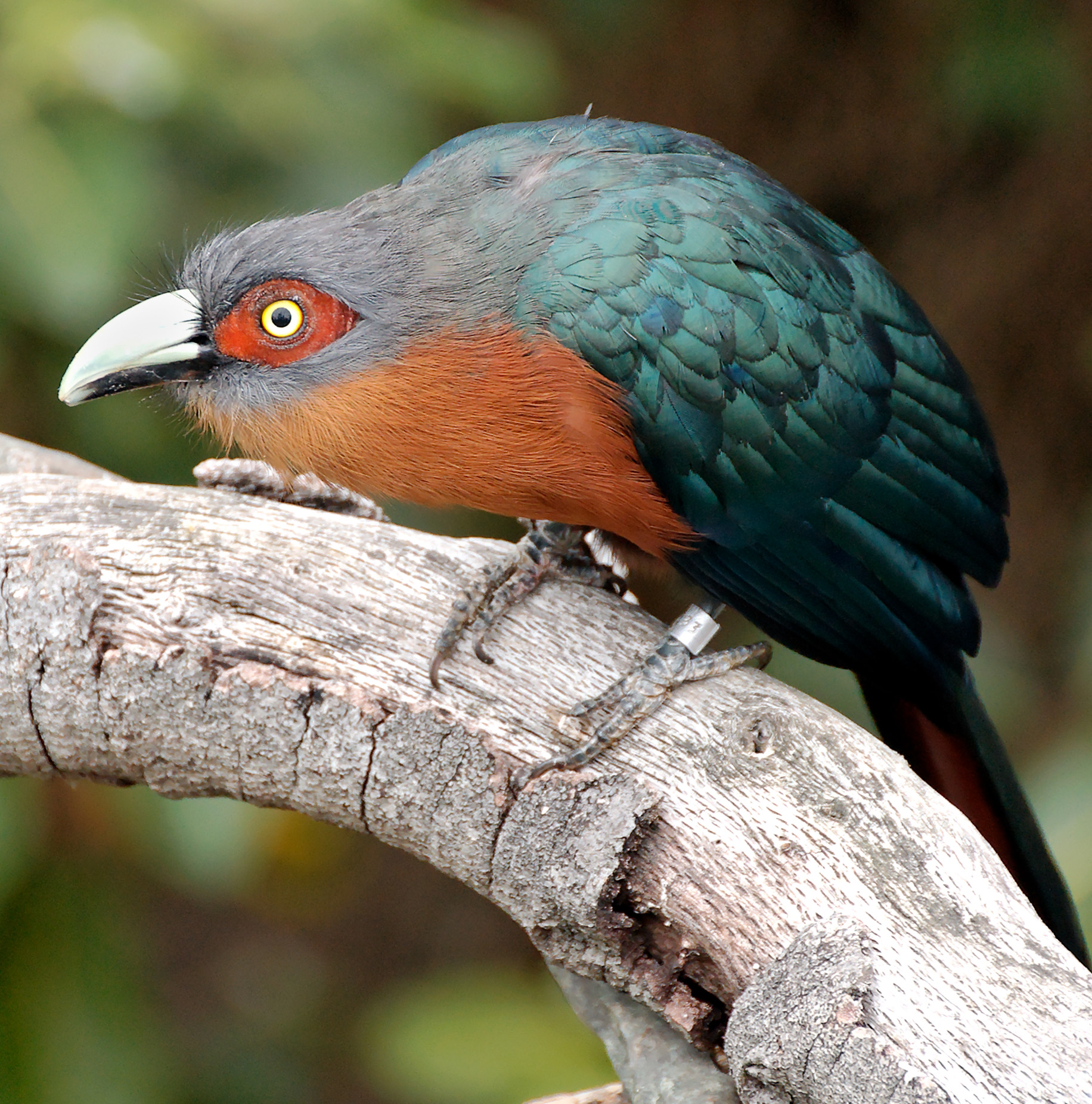
The chestnut-breasted malkoha is typical of the Phaenicophaeinae in having brightly coloured skin around the eye.

Cuckoos are medium-sized birds that range in size from the little bronze cuckoo, at 17 g (0.6 oz) and 15 cm (6 in), to moderately large birds, ranging from 60–80 cm (24–31 in) in length, such as the giant coua of Madagascar, the coral-billed ground cuckoo of Indochina, and various large Indo-Pacific coucals such as the goliath coucal of Halmahera, Timor coucal, buff-headed coucal, ivory-billed coucal, violaceous coucal, and larger forms of the pheasant coucal.

The channel-billed cuckoo, at 630 g (1 lb 6 oz) and 63 cm (25 in) is the largest parasitic cuckoo. Generally, little sexual dimorphism in size occurs, but where it exists, it can be either the male or the female that is larger. One of the most important distinguishing features of the family is the feet, which are zygodactyl, meaning that the two inner toes point forward and the two outer backward. The two basic body forms are arboreal species, such as the common cuckoo, which are slender and have short tarsi, and terrestrial species, such as the roadrunners, which are more heavy set and have long tarsi.

Almost all species have long tails that are used for steering in terrestrial species and as a rudder during flight in the arboreal species. The wing shape also varies with lifestyle, with the more migratory species such as the black-billed cuckoo possessing long, narrow wings capable of strong, direct flight, and the more terrestrial and sedentary cuckoos such as the coucals and malkohas having shorter rounded wings and a more laboured, gliding flight.

The subfamily Cuculinae comprises the brood-parasitic cuckoos of the Old World. They tend to conform to the classic shape, with usually long tails, short legs, long, narrow wings, and an arboreal lifestyle. The largest species, the channel-billed cuckoo, also has the most outsized bill in the family, resembling that of a hornbill. The subfamily Phaenicophaeinae comprises the nonparasitic cuckoos of the Old World, and include the couas, malkohas, and ground cuckoos. They are more terrestrial cuckoos, with strong and often long legs and short, rounded wings. The subfamily typically has brighter plumage and brightly coloured bare skin around the eye.

The coucals are another terrestrial Old World subfamily of long-tailed, long-legged, and short-winged cuckoos. They are large, heavy-set birds with the largest, the greater black coucal, being around the same size as the channel-billed cuckoo. Genera of the subfamily Coccyzinae are arboreal and long-tailed, as well, with a number of large insular forms. The New World ground cuckoos are similar to the Asian ground cuckoos in being long legged and terrestrial, and includes the long-billed roadrunner, which can reach speeds of 30 km/h (19 mph) when chasing prey. The final subfamily includes the atypical anis, which are the small, clumsy anis and the larger guira cuckoo. The anis have massive bills and smooth, glossy feathers.

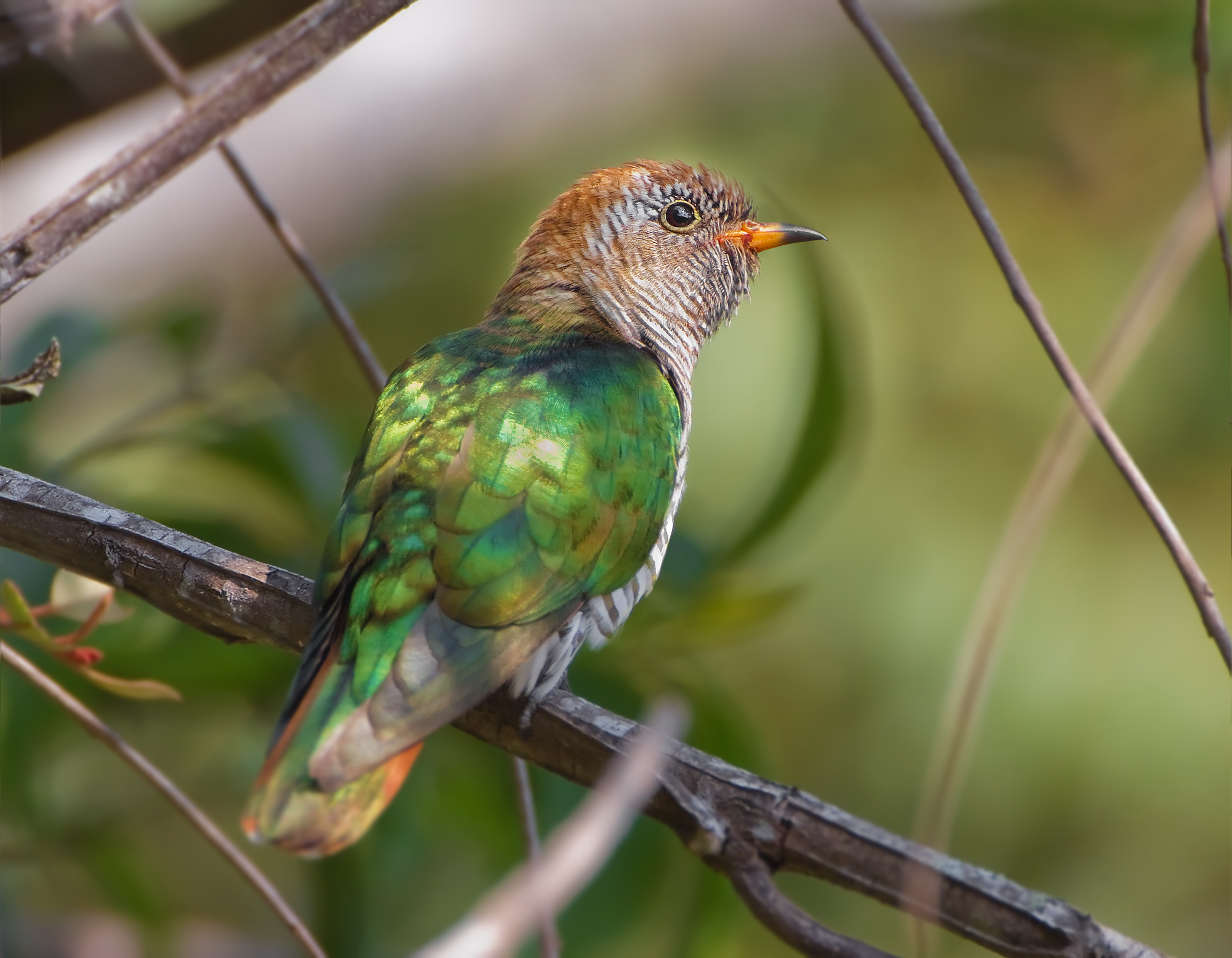
Some species, such as the Asian emerald cuckoo (Chrysococcyx maculatus) exhibit iridescent plumage.

The feathers of the cuckoos are generally soft, and often become waterlogged in heavy rain. Cuckoos often sun themselves after rain, and the anis hold their wings open in the manner of a vulture or cormorant while drying. Considerable variation in the plumage is exhibited by the family. Some species, particularly the brood parasites, have cryptic plumage, whereas others have bright and elaborate plumage. This is particularly true of the Chrysococcyx or glossy cuckoos, which have iridescent plumage. Some cuckoos have a resemblance to hawks in the genus Accipiter with barring on the underside; this apparently alarms potential hosts, allowing the female to access a host nest.

The young of some brood parasites are coloured to resemble the young of the host. For example, the Asian koels breeding in India have black offspring to resemble their crow hosts. In the Australian koels, the chicks are brown like their honeyeater hosts. Sexual dimorphism in plumage is uncommon in the cuckoos, being most common in the parasitic Old World species. Cuckoos have 10 primary flight feathers and 9–13 secondary flight feathers. All species have 10 tail feathers, apart from the anis, which have eight.

== Distribution and habitat ==
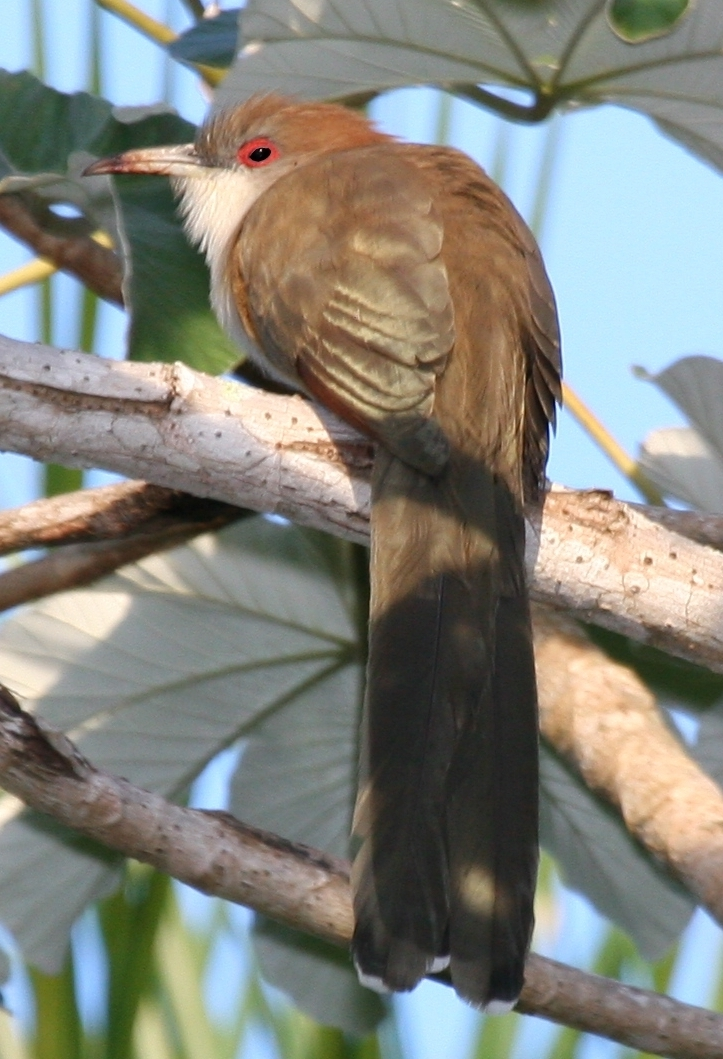
The great lizard cuckoo is a large, insular cuckoo of the Caribbean.

Cuckoos have a cosmopolitan distribution, ranging across all the world's continents except Antarctica. They are absent from the southwest of South America, the far north and northwest of North America, and the driest areas of the Middle East and North Africa, although they occur there as passage migrants. In the oceanic islands of the Atlantic and Indian Oceans they generally only occur as vagrants, but one species breeds on a number of Pacific islands and another is a winter migrant across much of the Pacific.

The Cuculinae are the most widespread subfamily of cuckoos, and are distributed across Europe, Asia, Africa, Australia, and Oceania. Amongst the Phaenicophaeinae, the malkohas and Asian ground cuckoos are restricted to southern Asia, the couas are endemic to Madagascar, and the yellowbill is widespread across Africa. The coucals are distributed from Africa through tropical Asia south into Australia and the Solomon Islands. The remaining three subfamilies have a New World distribution, all are found in both North and South America. The Coccyzinae reach the furthest north of the three subfamilies, breeding in Canada, whereas the anis reach as far north as Florida and the typical ground cuckoos are in the Southwest United States.

For the cuckoos, suitable habitat provides a source of food, principally insects and especially caterpillars, and a place to breed. For brood parasites the need is for suitable habitat for the host species. Cuckoos occur in a wide variety of habitats. The majority of species occur in forests and woodland, principally in the evergreen rainforests of the tropics, where they are typically but not exclusively arboreal. Some species inhabit or are even restricted to mangrove forests. These include the little bronze cuckoo of Australia, some malkohas, coucals, and the aptly named mangrove cuckoo of the New World.

In addition to forests, some species of cuckoos occupy more open environments. This can include even arid areas such as deserts in the case of the greater roadrunner or the pallid cuckoo. Temperate migratory species, such as the common cuckoo, inhabit a wide range of habitats to make maximum use of the potential brood hosts, from reed beds (where they parasitise reed warblers) to treeless moors, where they parasitise meadow pipits.

=== Migration ===
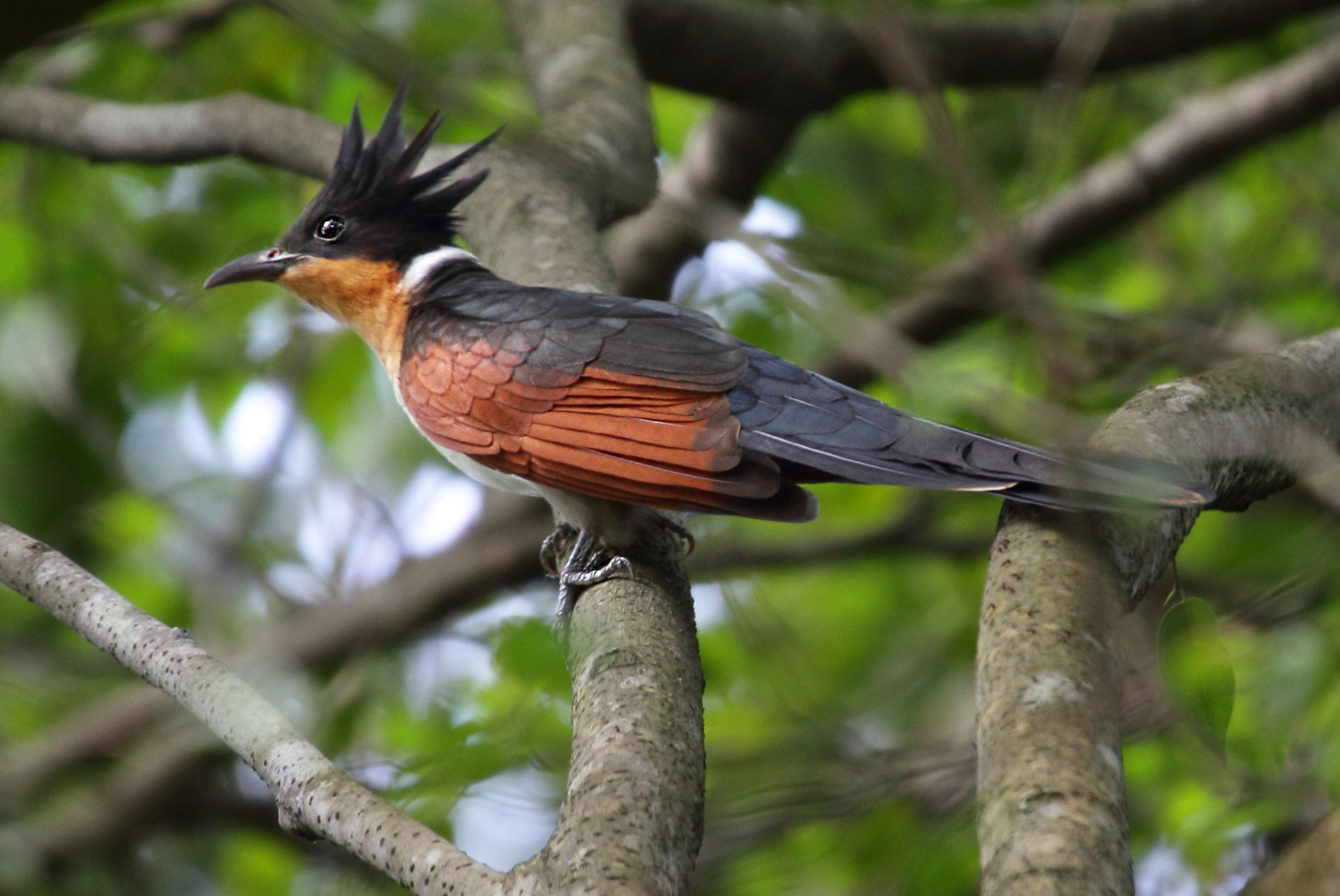
A chestnut-winged cuckoo in Singapore

Most species of cuckoo are sedentary, but some undertake regular seasonal migrations, and others undertake partial migrations over part of their range.

Species breeding at higher latitudes migrate to warmer climates during the winter due to food availability. The long-tailed koel, which breeds in New Zealand, flies to its wintering grounds in Polynesia, Micronesia, and Melanesia, a feat described as "perhaps the most remarkable overwater migration of any land bird." The yellow-billed cuckoo and black-billed cuckoo breed in North America and fly across the Caribbean Sea, a nonstop flight of 4,000 km (2,500 mi). Other long migration flights include the lesser cuckoo, which flies from Africa to India, and the common cuckoo of Europe, which flies nonstop over the Mediterranean Sea and Sahara Desert on the voyage between Europe and central Africa.

Within Africa, 10 species make regular intracontinental migrations that are described as polarised. That is, they spend the nonbreeding season in the tropical centre of Africa and move north and south to breed in the more arid and open savannah and deserts. This is the same as the situation in the Neotropics, where no species have this migration pattern, or tropical Asia, where a single species does. About 83% of the Australian species are partial migrants within Australia or travel to New Guinea and Indonesia after the breeding season.

In some species, the migration is diurnal, as in the channel-billed cuckoo, or nocturnal, as in the yellow-billed cuckoo.

== Behaviour and ecology ==
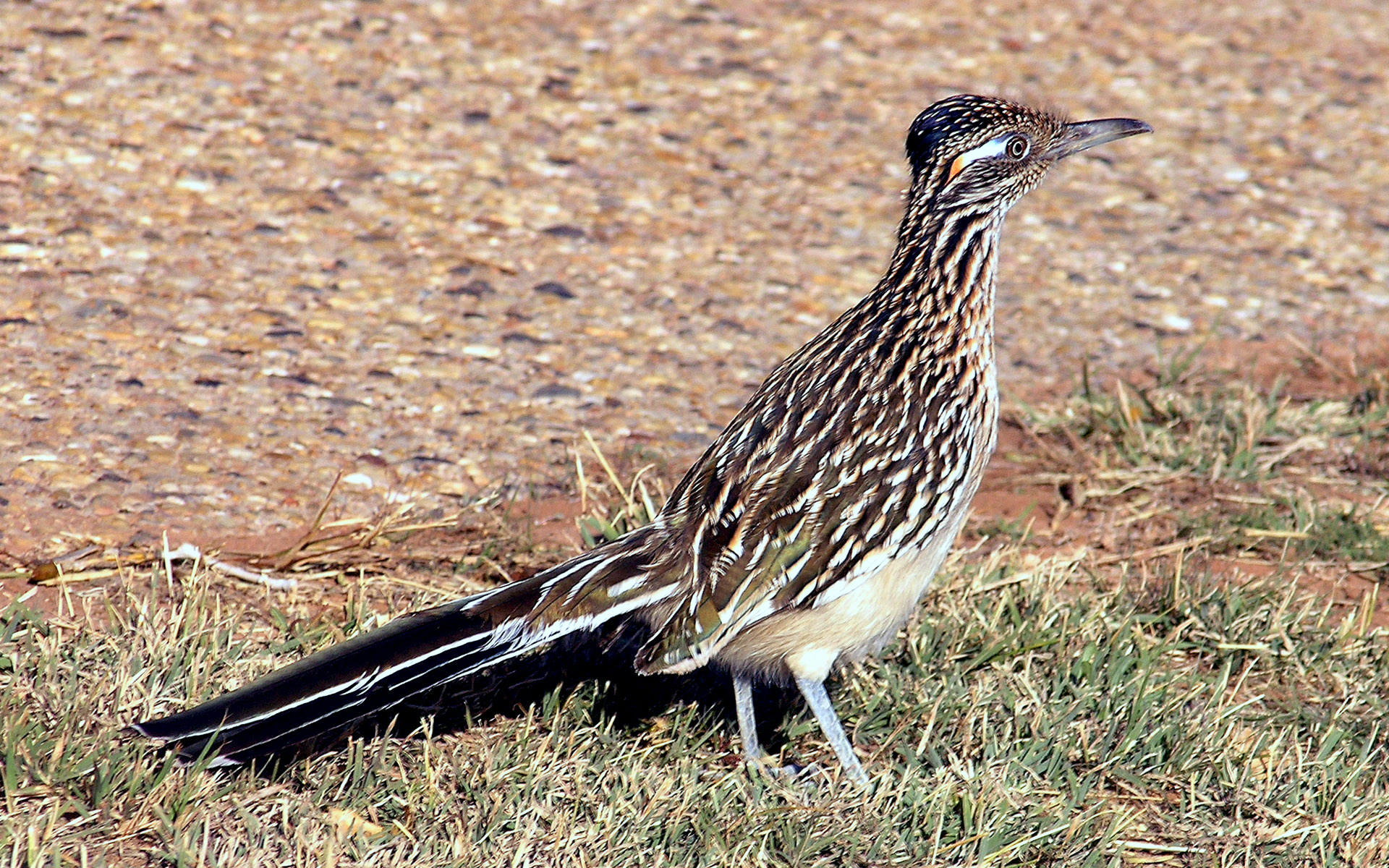
The greater roadrunner is rarely seen flying.

The cuckoos are, for the most part, solitary birds that seldom occur in pairs or groups. The biggest exception to this are the anis of the Americas, which have evolved cooperative breeding and other social behaviour. For the most part, the cuckoos are also diurnal as opposed to nocturnal, but many species call at night (see below). The cuckoos are also generally a shy and retiring family, more often heard than seen. The exception to this is again the anis, which are often extremely trusting towards humans and other species.

=== Diet and feeding ===
Most cuckoos are insectivores, and in particular are specialised in eating larger insects and caterpillars, including noxious, hairy types avoided by other birds. They are unusual among birds in processing their prey prior to swallowing, rubbing it back and forth on hard objects such as branches and then crushing it with special bony plates in the back of the mouth. They also take a wide range of other insects and animal prey.

Larger, ground types, such as coucals and roadrunners, also feed variously on snakes, lizards, small rodents, and other birds, which they bludgeon with their strong bills. The lizard cuckoos of the Caribbean have, in the relative absence of birds of prey, specialised in taking lizards. Ground species may employ different techniques to catch prey. A study of two coua species in Madagascar found that Coquerel's coua obtained prey by walking and gleaning on the forest floor, whereas the red-capped coua ran and pounced on prey. Both species also showed seasonal flexibility in prey and foraging techniques.

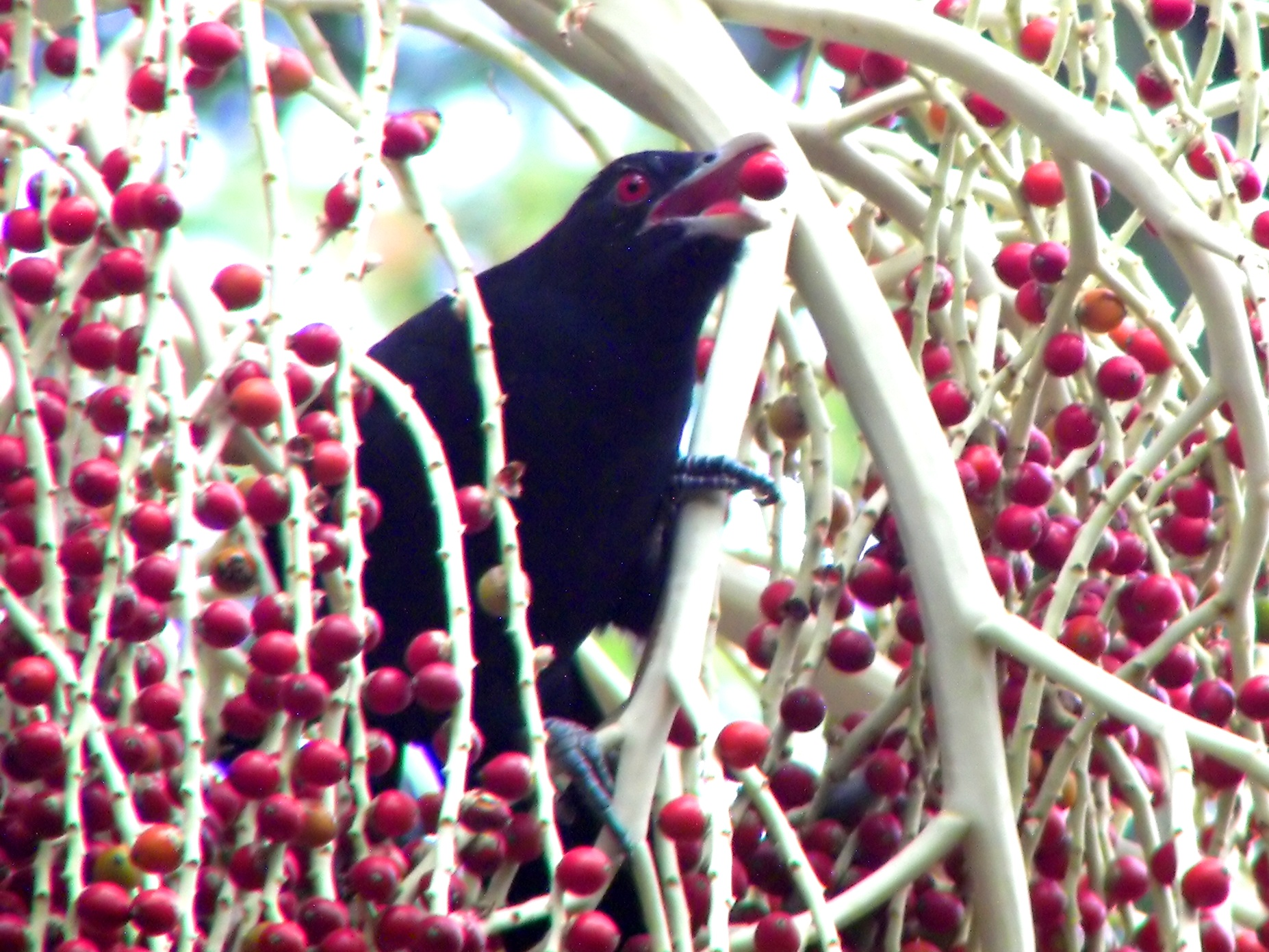
Unlike most cuckoos, the Asian koel is mostly frugivorous.

The parasitic cuckoos are generally not recorded as participating in mixed-species feeding flocks, although some studies in eastern Australia found several species participated in the nonbreeding season, but were mobbed and unable to do so in the breeding season. Ground cuckoos of the genus Neomorphus are sometimes seen feeding in association with army ant swarms, although they are not obligate ant followers, as are some antbirds. The anis are ground feeders that follow cattle and other large mammals when foraging. In a similar fashion to cattle egrets, they snatch prey flushed by the cattle, so enjoy higher foraging success rates in this way.

Several koels, couas, and the channel-billed cuckoo feed mainly on fruit, but they are not exclusively frugivores. The parasitic koels and channel-billed cuckoo in particular consume mainly fruit when raised by frugivore hosts such as the Australasian figbird and pied currawong. Other species occasionally take fruit, as well. Couas consume fruit in the dry season when prey is harder to find.

=== Breeding ===
The cuckoos are an extremely diverse group of birds with regards to breeding systems. Most are monogamous, but exceptions exist. The anis and the guira cuckoo lay their eggs in communal nests, which are built by all members of the group. Incubation, brooding, and territorial defence duties are shared by all members of the group. Within these species, the anis breed as groups of monogamous pairs, but the guira cuckoos are not monogamous within the group, exhibiting a polygynandrous breeding system.

This group nesting behaviour is not completely cooperative. Females compete and may remove others' eggs when laying theirs. Eggs are usually only ejected early in the breeding season in the anis, but can be ejected at any time by guria cuckoos. Polyandry has been confirmed in the African black coucal and is suspected to occur in the other coucals, perhaps explaining the reversed sexual dimorphism in the group.

Most cuckoo species, including malkohas, couas, coucals, and roadrunners, and most other American cuckoos, build their own nests, although a large minority engages in brood parasitism (see below). Most of these species nest in trees or bushes, but the coucals lay their eggs in nests on the ground or in low shrubs. Though on some occasions nonparasitic cuckoos parasitize other species, the parent still helps feed the chick.

The nests of cuckoos vary in the same way as the breeding systems. The nests of malkohas and Asian ground cuckoos are shallow platforms of twigs, but those of coucals are globular or domed nests of grasses. The New World cuckoos build saucers or bowls in the case of the New World ground cuckoos.

Nonparasitic cuckoos, like most other nonpasserines, lay white eggs, but many of the parasitic species lay coloured eggs to match those of their passerine hosts.

The young of all species are altricial. Nonparasitic cuckoos leave the nest before they can fly, and some New World species have the shortest incubation periods among birds.

==== Brood parasitism ====
A pallid cuckoo juvenile being fed by three separate foster-parent species

About 56 of the Old World species and three of the New World cuckoo species (pheasant, pavonine, and striped) are brood parasites, laying their eggs in the nests of other birds and giving rise to the metaphor "cuckoo's egg". These species are obligate brood parasites, meaning that they only reproduce in this fashion. The best-known example is the European common cuckoo. In addition to the above noted species, others sometimes engage in nonobligate brood parasitism, laying their eggs in the nests of members of their own species, in addition to raising their own young.

Brood parasitism has even been seen in greater roadrunners, where their eggs were seen in the nests of common ravens and northern mockingbirds. The shells of the eggs of brood-parasitic cuckoos are usually thicker and stronger than those of their hosts. This protects the egg if a host parent tries to damage it, and may make it resistant to cracking when dropped into a host nest.

Cuckoo eggshells have two distinct layers. In some nesting cuckoos, there is a thick outer chalky layer that is not present on the eggs of most brood-parasitic species, although there are some exceptions and the eggshells of Old World parasitic cuckoos have a thick outer layer that is different from that of nesting cuckoos.

==== Parasitic cuckoo advanced laying and hatching ====
The cuckoo egg hatches earlier than the host eggs, and the cuckoo chick grows faster. In most cases, the chick evicts the eggs and/or young of the host species. The chick has no time to learn this behaviour, nor does any parent stay around to teach it, so it must be an instinct passed on genetically.

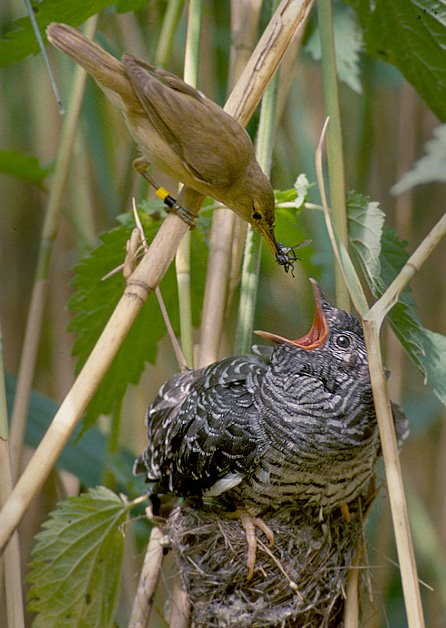
A reed warbler raising the young of a common cuckoo

One reason for the cuckoo egg's hatching sooner is that, after the egg is fully formed, the female cuckoo holds it in her oviduct for another 24 hours prior to laying. This means that the egg has already had 24 hours of internal incubation. The cuckoo's internal temperature is 3–4 °C higher than the temperature at which the egg is incubated in the nest, and the higher temperature means that the egg incubates faster, so at the time it is laid, the egg has already had the equivalent of 30 hours incubation in a nest.

The chick encourages the host to keep pace with its high growth rate with its rapid begging call and the chick's open mouth which serves as a sign stimulus.

==== Evolutionary arms race between cuckoo and host ====
Since obligate brood parasites need to successfully trick their host for them to reproduce, they have evolved adaptations at several stages of breeding. High costs of parasitism are exerted on the host, which exerts strong selective pressures on the host species to recognize and reject parasitic eggs. The adaptations and counter-adaptations between hosts and parasites have led to a coevolution "arms race". This means that if one of the species involved were to stop adapting, it would lose the race to the other species, resulting in decreased fitness of the losing species. The egg-stage adaptation is the best studied stage of this arms race.

Cuckoos have various strategies for getting their eggs into host nests. Different species use different strategies based on host defensive strategies. Female cuckoos have secretive and fast laying behaviour, but in some cases, males have been shown to lure host adults away from their nests so that the females can lay their eggs in the nest. Some host species may directly try to prevent cuckoos laying eggs in their nest in the first place; birds whose nests are at high risk of cuckoldry are known to "mob" attack cuckoos to drive them out of the area. Parasitic cuckoos are grouped into gentes, with each gens specializing in a particular host. Some evidence suggests that the gentes are genetically different from one another.

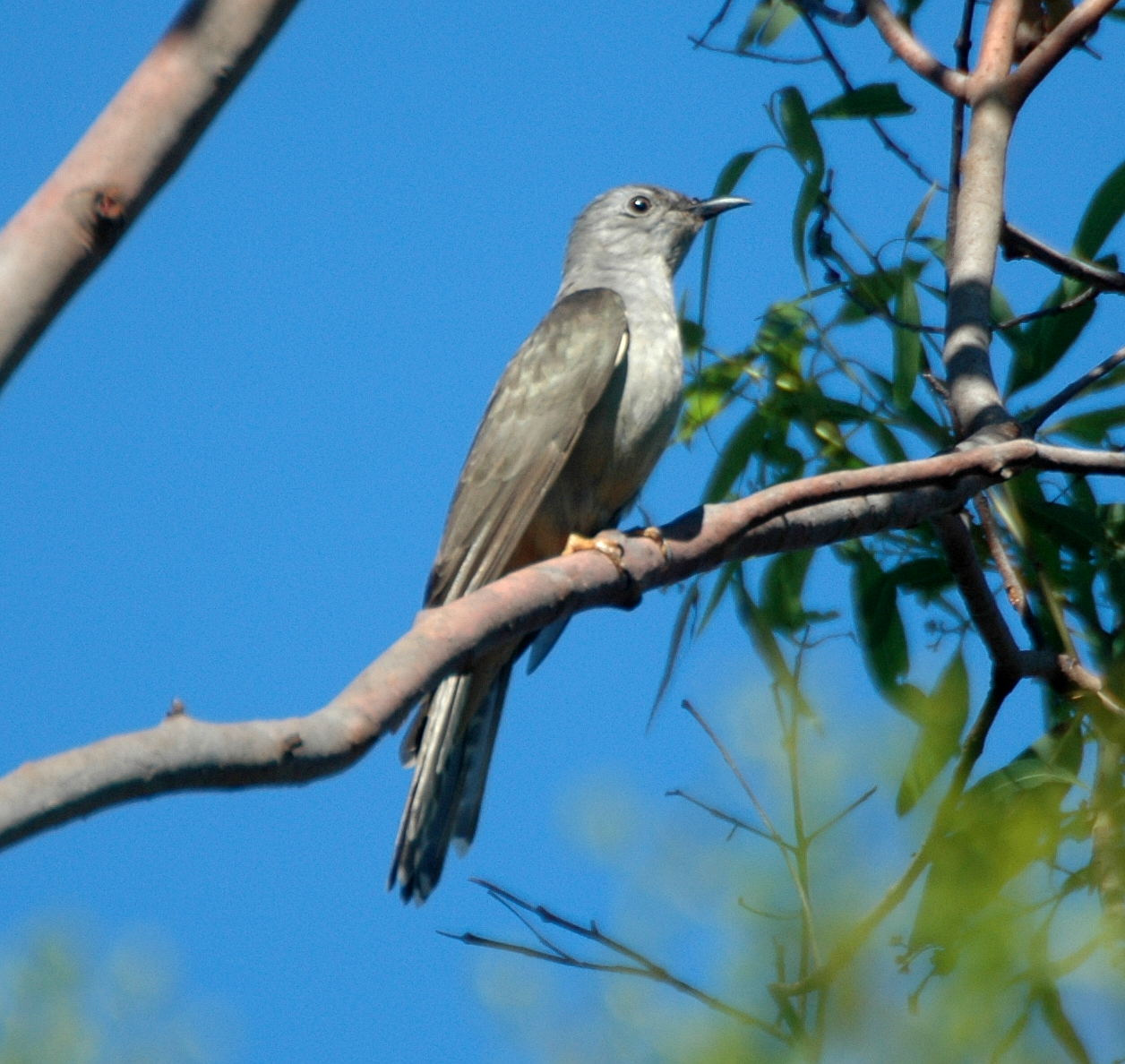
The call of the brush cuckoo

==== Host egg mimicry ====
Female parasitic cuckoos sometimes specialize and lay eggs that closely resemble the eggs of their chosen host. Some birds are able to distinguish cuckoo eggs from their own, leading to those eggs least like the host's being thrown out of the nest. Parasitic cuckoos that show the highest levels of egg mimicry are those whose hosts exhibit high levels of egg rejection behaviour. Some hosts do not exhibit egg rejection behaviour and the cuckoo eggs look very dissimilar from the host eggs. It has also been shown in a study of the European common cuckoos that females lay their egg in the nest of a host that has eggs that look similar to its own.

Other species of cuckoo lay "cryptic" eggs, which are dark in colour when their hosts' eggs are light. This is a trick to hide the egg from the host, and is exhibited in cuckoos that parasitize hosts with dark, domed nests. Some adult parasitic cuckoos completely destroy the host's clutch if they reject the cuckoo egg. In this case, raising the cuckoo chick is less of a cost than the alternative, total clutch destruction.

Cuckoo egg physiology can limit the degree of mimetic accuracy. Due to larger chick size on average for parasites compared to hosts, this is a physiological constraint on egg size, a minimum egg size needed to support a healthy cuckoo chick. In these cases, there is selective pressure on cuckoos to lessen their egg size to be a more effective mimic, but physiological constraints hinder the species from doing so.

Mimicry may also be imperfect due to a lack of strong selection pressures towards the parasite. Oriental reed warbler hosts do not discriminate between warbler-sized model eggs and slightly larger model cuckoo eggs. Since cuckoos in this situation can effectively parasitize despite laying eggs slightly larger than those of their hosts, there are little selective pressures to evolve "perfect" mimicry.

To select the most suitable host nests, cuckoos may "egg-match" as well. Daurian redstarts (Phoenicurus auroreus), another cuckoo host, lay clutches of either pink or blue eggs. Cuckoo eggs are more similar in reflectance and colour to blue redstart eggs than pink ones. In-field observations revealed parasitism occurred more frequently in blue-egg redstart nests (19.3%) than in pink-egg redstart nests (7.9%). This suggests cuckoos prefer parasitizing nests containing eggs resembling their own. Experiments in the lab show similar findings: cuckoos parasitized artificial nests containing blue eggs more frequently than pink ones, and mathematical simulations further showed that cuckoos with moderate range of cheating success rate for egg colour (and/or shape) has higher long-term survival capacity.

Two main hypotheses on the cognitive mechanisms mediate host distinguishing of eggs. One hypothesis is true recognition, which states that a host compares eggs present in its clutch to an internal template (learnt or innate), to identify if parasitic eggs are present. However, memorizing a template of a parasitic egg is costly and imperfect and likely not identical to each host's egg. The other one is the discordancy hypothesis, which states that a host compares eggs in the clutch and identifies the odd ones. However, if parasitic eggs made the majority of eggs in the clutch, then hosts ends up rejecting their own eggs. More recent studies have found that both mechanisms more likely contribute to host discrimination of parasitic eggs since one compensates for the limitations of the other.

==== Possible evidence of host benefits in the face of cuckoo parasitism ====
The parasitism is not necessarily entirely detrimental to the host species. A 16-year dataset was used in 2014 to find that carrion crow nests in a region of northern Spain were more successful overall (more likely to produce at least one crow fledgling) when parasitised by the great spotted cuckoo. The researchers attributed this to a strong-smelling predator-repelling substance secreted by cuckoo chicks when attacked, and noted that the interactions were not necessarily simply parasitic or mutualistic. This relationship was not observed for any other host species, or for any other species of cuckoo. Great spotted cuckoo chicks do not evict host eggs or young, and are smaller and weaker than carrion crow chicks, so both of these factors may have contributed to the effect observed.

Subsequent research using a dataset from southern Spain failed to replicate these findings, and the second research team also criticised the methodology used in experiments described in the first paper. The authors of the first study have responded to points made in the second and both groups agree that further research is needed before the mutualistic effect can be considered proven.

=== Calls ===
Cuckoos are often highly secretive, and in many cases, best known for their wide repertoire of calls. These are usually relatively simple, resembling whistles, flutes, or hiccups. The calls are used to demonstrate ownership of a territory and to attract a mate. Within a species, the calls are remarkably consistent across the range, even in species with very large ranges. This suggests, along with the fact that many species are not raised by their true parents, that the calls of cuckoos are innate and not learnt. Although cuckoos are diurnal, many species call at night.

The cuckoo family gets its English and scientific names from the call of the male common cuckoo, also familiar from cuckoo clocks. In most cuckoos, the calls are distinctive to particular species, and are useful for identification. Several cryptic species are best identified on the basis of their calls.

== Phylogeny and evolution ==
The family Cuculidae was introduced by English zoologist William Elford Leach in a guide to the contents of the British Museum published in 1819.

Very little fossil record of cuckoos has been found, and their evolutionary history remains unclear. Dynamopterus was an Oligocene genus of large cuckoo, though it may have been related to cariamas, instead.

A 2014 genome analysis by Erich Jarvis and collaborators found a clade of birds that contains the orders Cuculiformes (cuckoos), Musophagiformes (turacos), and Otidiformes (bustards). This has been named the Otidimorphae. Relationships between the orders is unclear.

The following cladogram shows the phylogenetic relationships between the genera. It is from a 2005 study by Michael Sorenson and Robert Payne and is based solely on an analysis of mitochondrial DNA sequences. The number of species in each genus is taken from the list maintained by Frank Gill, Pamela Rasmussen and David Donsker on behalf of the International Ornithological Committee (IOC).

- Cuculidae
  - - Crotophaginae
      - Guira – guira cuckoo
      - Crotophaga – anis (3 species)
    - Neomorphinae
      - - Tapera – striped cuckoo
        - Dromococcyx – cuckoos (2 species)
      - - Morococcyx – lesser ground cuckoo
        - - Geococcyx – roadrunners (2 species)
          - Neomorphus – ground cuckoos (5 species)
  - - - Centropodinae
        Centropus – coucals (29 species)
      - Couinae
        - Carpococcyx – ground cuckoos (3 species)
        - Coua – couas (9 species)
    - Cuculinae
      - Rhinortha – Raffles's malkoha
      - - Phaenicophaeini
          - Ceuthmochares – malkohas (2 species)
          - - - Taccocua – sirkeer malkoha
              - - Zanclostomus – red-billed malkoha
                - Phaenicophaeus – malkohas (6 species)
            - - - Dasylophus – malkohas (2 species)
                - Rhamphococcyx – yellow-billed malkoha
              - - Clamator – cuckoos (4 species)
                - - Coccycua – cuckoos (3 species)
                  - - Piaya – cuckoos (2 species)
                    - Coccyzus – cuckoos (13 species)
        - Cuculini
          - - Pachycoccyx – thick-billed cuckoo
            - - Microdynamis – dwarf koel
              - Eudynamys – koels (3 species)
          - - - Scythrops – channel-billed cuckoo
              - Urodynamis – Pacific long-tailed cuckoo
            - - Chrysococcyx – cuckoos (13 species)
              - - Cacomantis – cuckoos (10 species)
                - - - Surniculus – drongo-cuckoos (4 species)
                    - Cercococcyx – long-tailed cuckoos (4 species)
                  - - Hierococcyx – hawk-cuckoos (8 species)
                    - Cuculus – typical cuckoos (11 species)

== Taxonomy and systematics ==
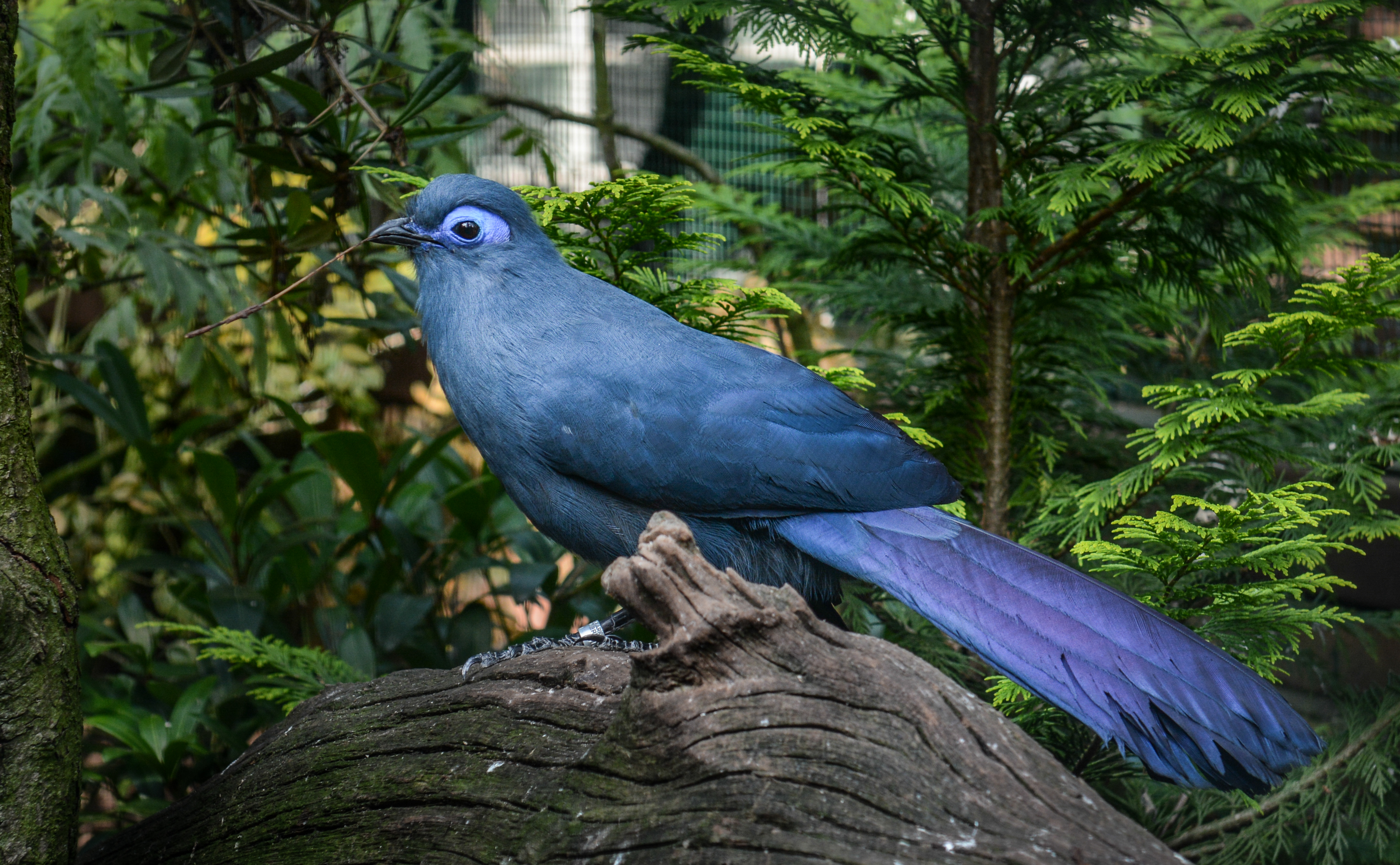
Blue coua (Coua caerulea)

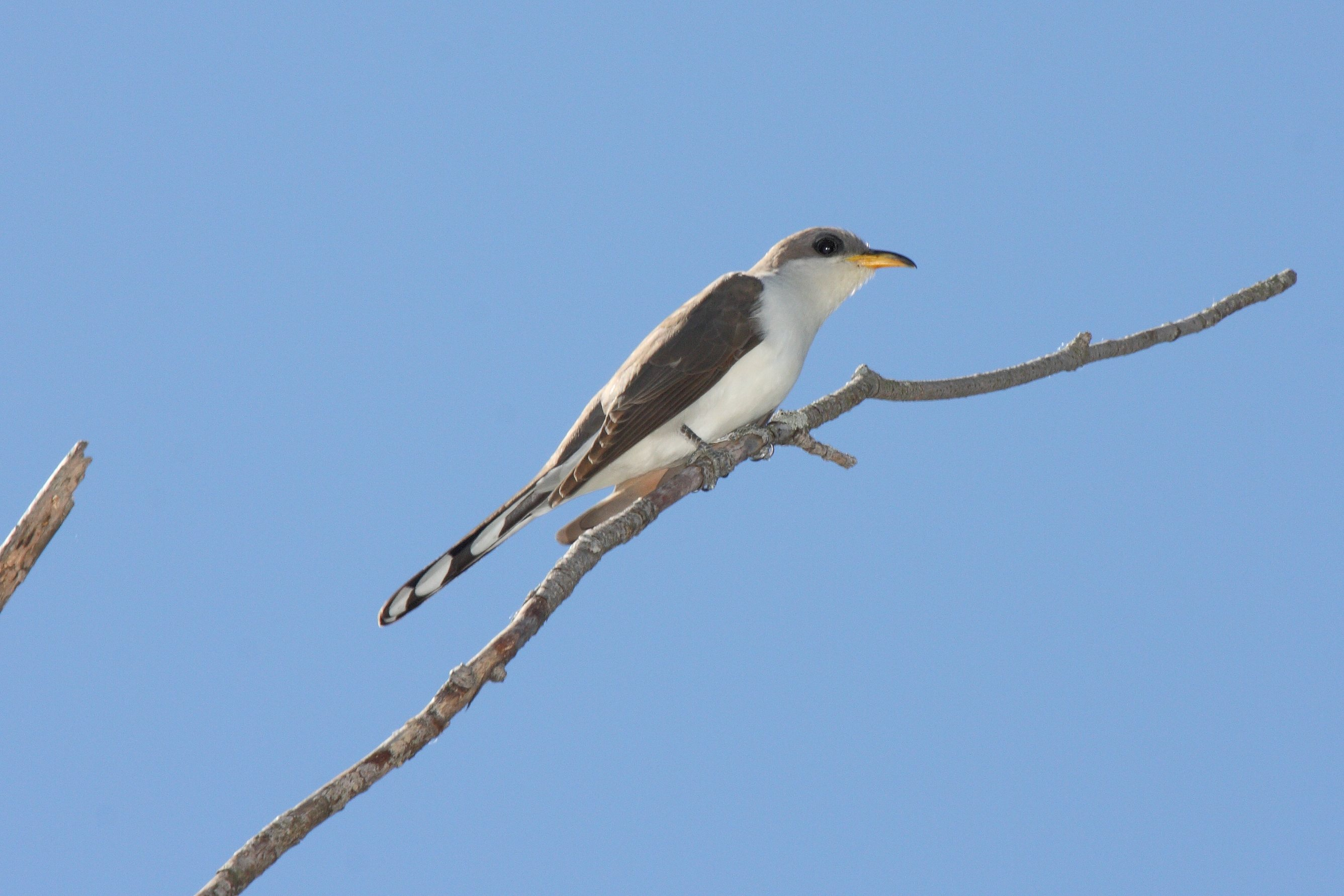
Yellow-billed cuckoo (Coccyzus americanus)

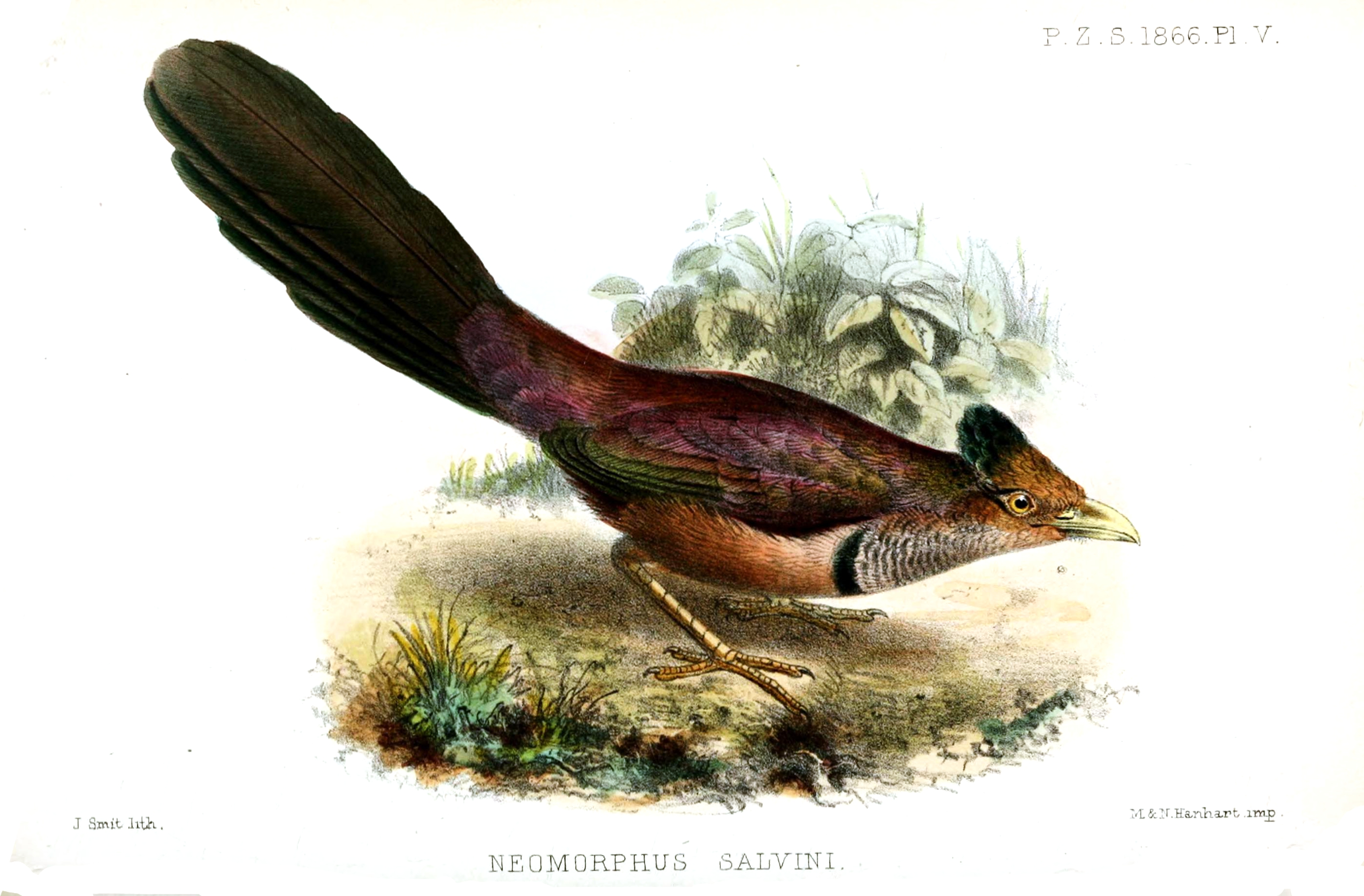
Rufous-vented ground cuckoo (Neomorphus geoffroyi)

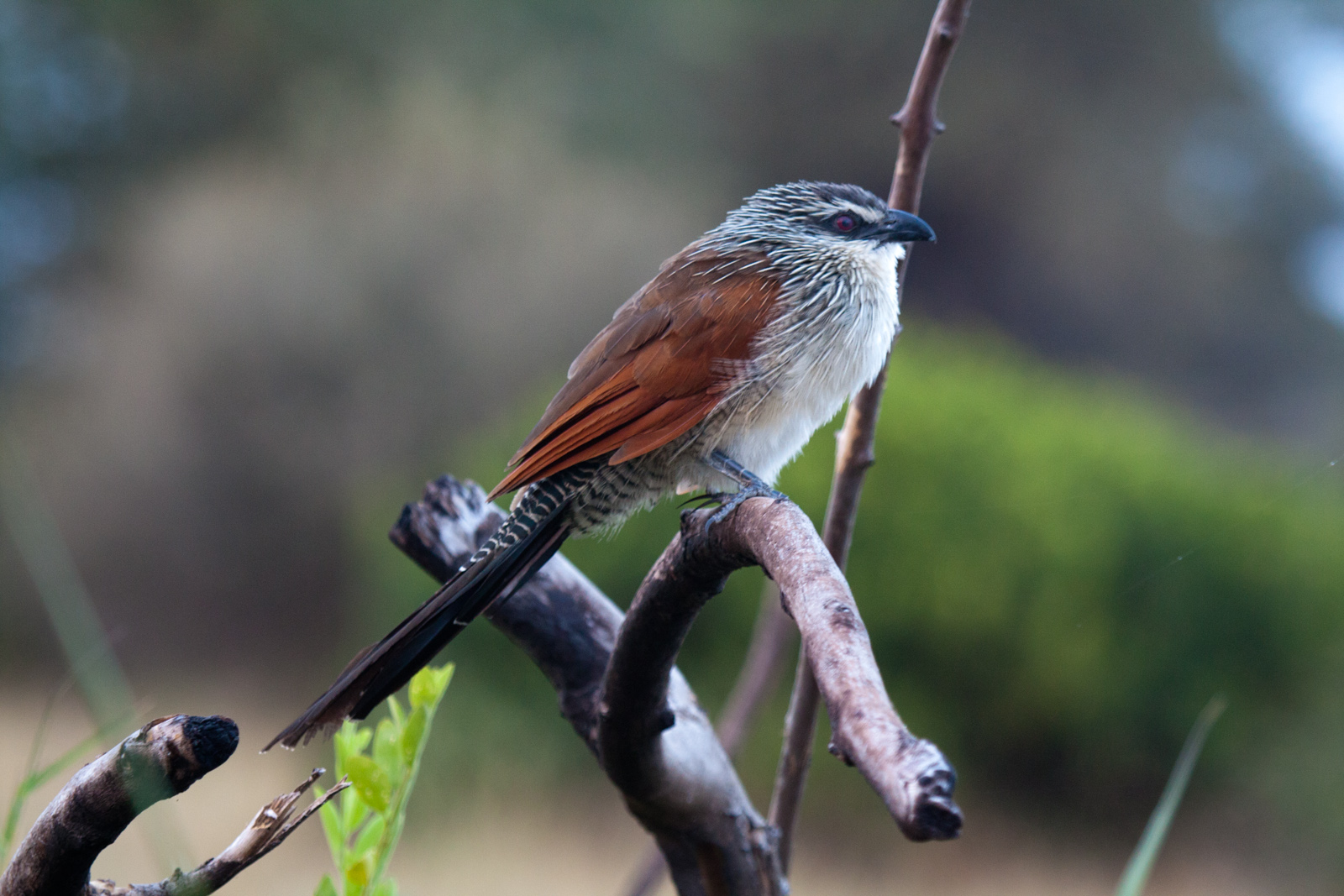
White-browed coucal (Centropus superciliosus)

For the living members of each genus, see the article List of cuckoo species.

The family Cuculidae contains 150 species which are divided into 33 genera. These numbers include two species that have become extinct in historical times: the snail-eating coua from Madagascar and the Saint Helena cuckoo which is placed in its own genus Nannococcyx.

- Subfamily Crotophaginae – New World group-living cuckoos
  - Genus Guira – guira cuckoo
  - Genus Crotophaga – true anis (3 species)
- Subfamily Neomorphinae – New World ground cuckoos
  - Genus Tapera – striped cuckoo
  - Genus Dromococcyx (2 species)
  - Genus Morococcyx – lesser ground cuckoo
  - Genus Geococcyx – roadrunners (2 species)
  - Genus Neomorphus – Neotropical ground cuckoos (5 species)
- Subfamily Centropodinae – coucals
  - Genus Centropus – (29 species)
- Subfamily Couinae – Malagasy and South East Asian ground cuckoos
  - Genus Carpococcyx – Asian ground cuckoos (3 species)
  - Genus Coua – couas (9 living species, 1 recently extinct)
- Subfamily Cuculinae
  - Genus Rhinortha – Raffles's malkoha
  - Tribe Phaenicophaeini
  - Genus Ceuthmochares – yellowbills (2 species)
  - Genus Taccocua – Sirkeer malkoha
  - Genus Zanclostomus – red-billed malkoha
  - Genus Phaenicophaeus – typical malkohas (6 species)
  - Genus Dasylophus – (2 species)
  - Genus Rhamphococcyx – yellow-billed malkoha
  - Genus Clamator – (4 species)
  - Genus Coccycua – formerly in Coccyzus and Piaya, includes Micrococcyx (3 species)
  - Genus Piaya – (3 species)
  - Genus Coccyzus – includes Saurothera and Hyetornis (13 species)
  - Tribe Cuculini – brood-parasitic cuckoos of the Old World
  - Genus Pachycoccyx – thick-billed cuckoo
  - Genus Microdynamis – dwarf koel
  - Genus Eudynamys – typical koels (3 species)
  - Genus Scythrops – channel-billed cuckoo
  - Genus Urodynamis – Pacific long-tailed cuckoo
  - Genus Chrysococcyx – bronze cuckoos (13 species)
  - Genus Cacomantis – (10 species)
  - Genus Surniculus – drongo-cuckoos (4 species)
  - Genus Cercococcyx – long-tailed cuckoos (4 species)
  - Genus Hierococcyx – hawk-cuckoos (8 species)
  - Genus Cuculus – typical cuckoos (11 species)
  - † Genus Nannococcyx – Saint Helena cuckoo (extinct)
- Fossils
  - Genus Dynamopterus (fossil: Late Eocene/Early Oligocene of Caylus, Tarn-et-Garonne, France)
  - Genus Cursoricoccyx (fossil: Early Miocene of Logan County, US) – Neomorphinae?
  - Cuculidae gen. et sp. indet. (fossil: Early Pliocene of Lee Creek Mine, US)
  - Genus Neococcyx (fossil: Early Oligocene of Central North America)
  - Genus Eocuculus (fossil: Late Eocene of Teller County, US)

== In culture ==
A golden cuckoo in the coat of arms of Suomenniemi, Finland

In Greek mythology, the god Zeus transformed himself into a cuckoo so that he could seduce the goddess Hera, to whom the bird was sacred. Three sacred cuckoos appear in the Finnish epic the Kalevala, connected to the death of a young girl who was being forced into marriage. In England, William Shakespeare alludes to the common cuckoo's association with spring, and with cuckoldry, in the courtly springtime song in his play Love's Labours Lost.

In India, cuckoos are sacred to Kamadeva, the god of desire and longing, whereas in Japan, the cuckoo symbolises unrequited love. Cuckoos are a sacred animal to the Bon religion of Tibet. Additionally, the brood parasitism of some cuckoo species gave rise to the term "cuckold", referring to the husband of an adulterous wife.

The orchestral composition "On Hearing the First Cuckoo in Spring" by Frederick Delius imitates sounds of the cuckoo. The musician Cosmo Sheldrake used cuckoo calls in his album "Wake Up Calls" in "Cuckoo Song". It uses cuckoo calls specifically made near Benjamin Britten's grave, Britten being the original composer/writer of the song.

The brood parasitism of cuckoos has been used in fiction, especially in horror. Often a humanoid creature places its children in human societies, sometimes by impregnating women, to take over their homes as cuckoo chicks take over another bird's nest. The book The Midwich Cuckoos and its adaptions (Village of the Damned 1960 and 1995), Cuckoo, and Vivarium all feature direct references to cuckoos and their brood parasitism.

== Sources ==
- Payne, R.B. (1997). "Family Cuculidaee (Cuckoos)". In del Hoyo, J.; Elliott, A.; Sargatal, J. (eds.). Handbook of the Birds of the World. Vol. 4: Sandgrouse to Cuckoos. Barcelona, Spain: Lynx Edicions. pp. 508–545. ISBN 978-84-87334-22-1.
- Payne, Robert B. (2005). The Cuckoos. Oxford: Oxford University Press. ISBN 978-0-19-850213-5.
