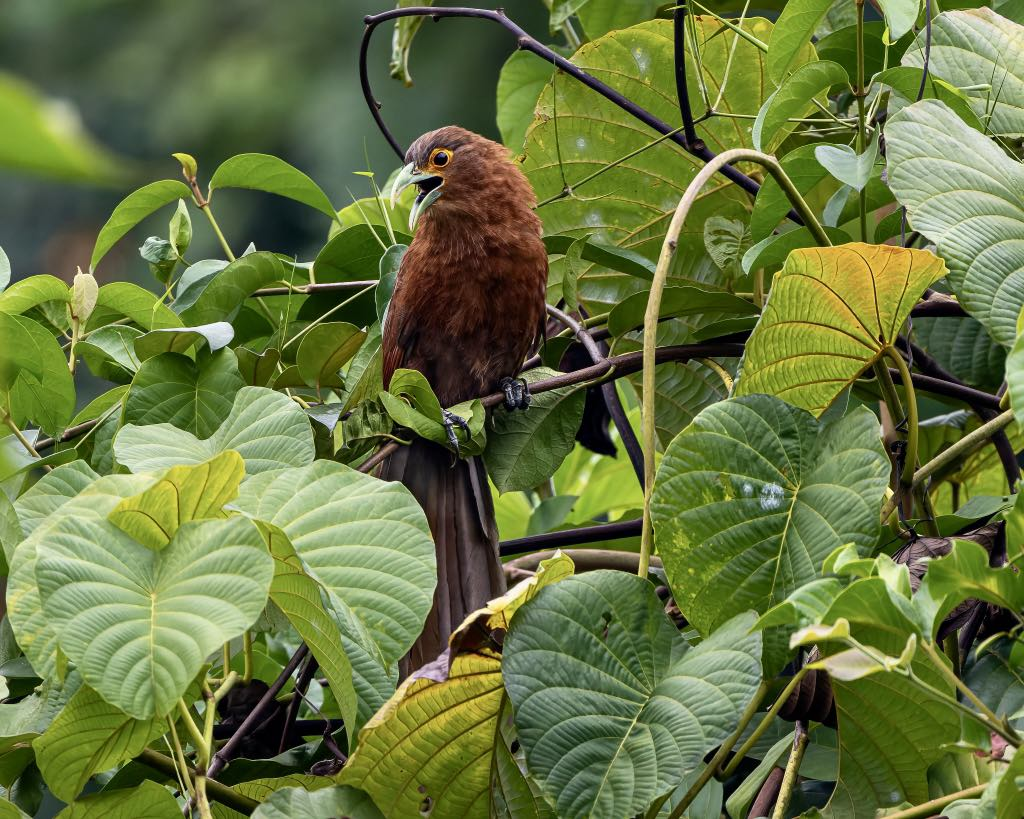

Conservation status
- Least Concern (IUCN 3.1)

Scientific classification
- Kingdom: Animalia
- Phylum: Chordata
- Class: Aves
- Order: Cuculiformes
- Family: Cuculidae
- Genus: Centropus
- Species: C. unirufus

Binomial name
- Centropus unirufus (Cabanis & Heine, 1863)

= Rufous coucal =

Species of bird

The rufous coucal (Centropus unirufus) is a species of cuckoo in the family Cuculidae. It is found in Luzon and proximate islands in the Philippines. Its natural habitat is tropical moist lowland forest. It is threatened by habitat loss. Along with the Philippine coucal, Black-faced coucal and the critically endangered Black-hooded coucal, it is one of the 4 endemic coucals in Philippines.

== Description and taxonomy ==
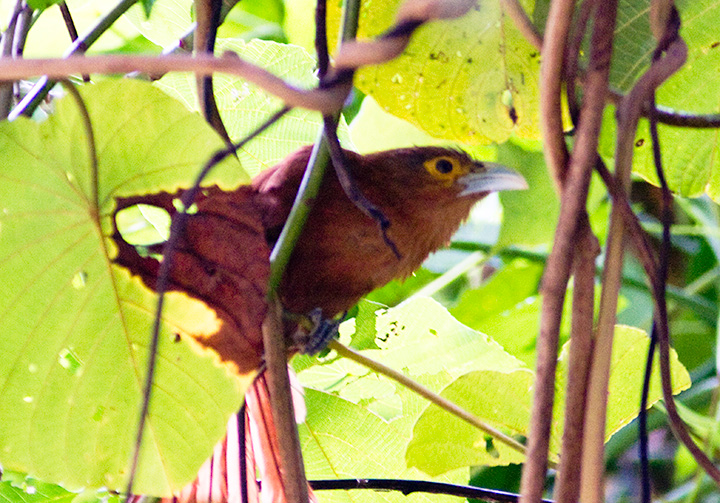

This is described as a large and long tailed bird of the lowland forests of Luzon. THis species is primarily reddish brown or rufous with a yellow orange eyering and a greenish yellow bill.

Its calll is describes as a frantic series of sharp and upslurred notes.

Further work should be done on this species' taxonomy as it is generally believed that its behaviour and appearance are more similar to that of a Malkoha rather than a Coucal.

== Ecology and behavior ==
Not much is known about its diet and breeding habits. It is pressumed to feed on insects. It is the only coucal in the country that forms large groups of up to 20 individuals. Forages in thick tangled vines and bamboo.

== Habitat and conservation status ==
Its natural habitat is tropical moist lowland forest where it prefers areas with dense undergrowth and tangles,

As of 2025, It is classified as Least-concern species by the International Union for Conservation of Nature but its population is said to be declining. Its threats are mainly habitat loss due to deforestation for lumber, mining and farmlands. There are no known targeted conservation actions for this bird, but it will indirectly benefit from the conservation of other North Luzon species like the Critically Endangered Isabela oriole.

It occurs in a few protected areas such as Northern Sierra Madre Natural Park and Bataan National Park but despite this legal protection, enforcement is lax and these areas continue to be deforested.
