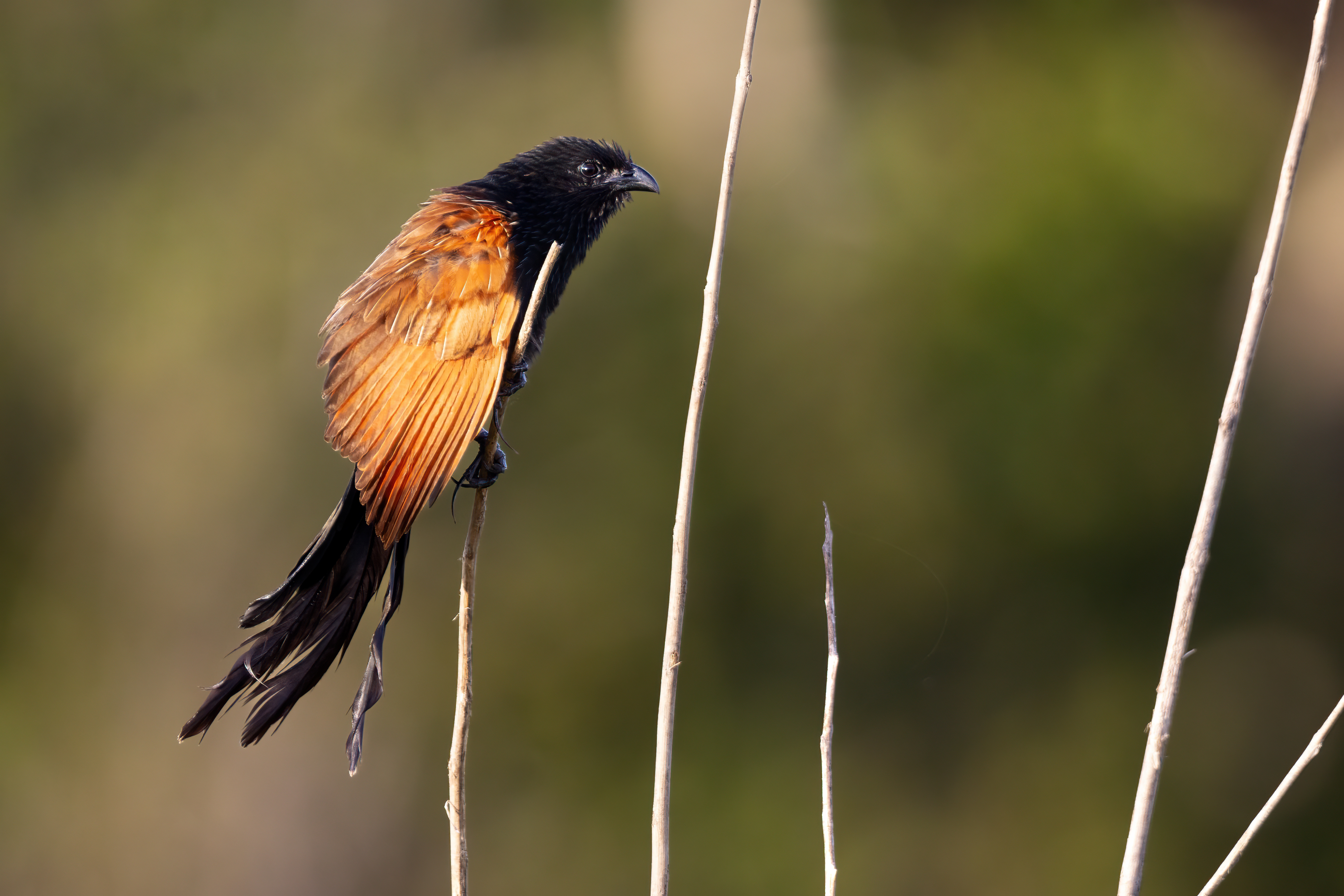

Conservation status
- Least Concern (IUCN 3.1)

Scientific classification
- Kingdom: Animalia
- Phylum: Chordata
- Class: Aves
- Order: Cuculiformes
- Family: Cuculidae
- Genus: Centropus
- Species: C. bengalensis

Binomial name
- Centropus bengalensis (Gmelin, JF, 1788)

Subspecies
- See text

= Lesser coucal =

Species of bird

Lesser Coucal, non breeding

The lesser coucal (Centropus bengalensis) is a species of cuckoo in the family Cuculidae. It has a wide distribution range that overlaps with several other similar species. The habitat in which it is found is often marshy land with grass and tree cover. It is distinguished by its smaller size, less prominent bill, pale shaft streaks on the feathers of the head and back. It has a much longer claw on its hind toe and a distinct call. It is also among the few coucals that show season plumage differences but like in other coucals, the sexes cannot be distinguished in the field.

== Taxonomy ==
The lesser coucal was formally described in 1788 by the German naturalist Johann Friedrich Gmelin in his revised and expanded edition of Carl Linnaeus's Systema Naturae. He placed it with all the other cuckoos in the genus Cuculus and coined the binomial name Cuculus bengalensis. Gmelin based his description on the "lark-heeled cuckoo" from Bengal that had been described and illustrated in 1776 by the English naturalist Peter Brown. The lesser coucal is now one of around 30 species placed in the genus Centropus that was introduced in 1811 by the German zoologist Johann Karl Wilhelm Illiger. The genus name combines the Ancient Greek kentron meaning "spur" or "spike" with pous meaning "foot".

Six subspecies are recognised:

- C. b. bengalensis (Gmelin, JF, 1788) – India and Nepal to Myanmar, Thailand and Indochina
- C. b. lignator Swinhoe, 1861 – south, southeast China, Hainan and Taiwan
- C. b. javanensis Dumont, 1818 – Malay Peninsula to Sumatra, Riau and Lingga Island (east of central Sumatra), Bangka and Belitung (east of south Sumatra), Java, Borneo, Palawan group and Sulu Archipelago (southwest, south Philippines)
- C. b. philippinensis Mees, 1971 – Philippines (except Palawan group and Sulu Archipelago) Sometimes included in javanensis.
- C. b. sarasinorum Stresemann, 1912 – Sulawesi, Sangihe and Talaud Islands (north of northeast Sulawesi) and Lesser Sunda Islands
- C. b. medius Bonaparte, 1850 – Moluccas (except Kai Islands, southeast Moluccas)

In the past, this species was lumped along with the Malagasy coucal (Centropus toulou) but comparison of DNA sequences suggest that the lesser coucal is more closely related to the black coucal (Centropus grillii) and Philippine coucal (Centropus viridis) than to any other relatives.

== Description ==
Subspecies javanensis in Taman Negara, Malaysia

This slightly smaller-sized and shorter-billed coucal has a very long hind claw, the longest within the genus. The overall plumage, as in many other coucals, is of a blackish bird with a long tail and rufous wings. They have two plumages, a breeding plumage in which the head and upper back are glossy with dark shafts to the feather and a duller non-breeding plumage in which the feather shafts on the head and back are whitish. The wing coverts also have pale shafts showing as whitish streaks on the brown feathers. The central upper tail coverts are barred and very long. The iris is darker brown and not the crimson red as in the greater coucal. Juveniles have black spots, bars and have a browner colour. The calls of the lesser coucal include a series of low double "whoot-woot" or "kurook" notes that increase in tempo and descend in pitch. The Indonesian name of dudut is onomatopoeic.

Call recorded in southern India (April)

The species is widely distributed west from the Indian subcontinent (but not in Sri Lanka despite an old report of a skin of doubtful provenance) extending east across Southeast Asia. Slight differences in size and plumage are noted in different parts of their range and several subspecies have been designated. The nominate form is found from India to Thailand. Subspecies lignator is larger and found in southeastern China and Taiwan. Subspecies javanensis is smaller and found across the larger islands along the Malay Peninsula extending east to the Philippines. Some island forms are larger and these include sarasinorum and found on Sulawesi, the Sula Islands, Lesser Sundas and Timor. The form on the Moluccas, medius is the largest. Some other subspecies like philippinensis from the Philippines and chamnongi from Thailand are not always recognized and are thought to form either variants or intermediate plumages. The population patchily distributed in the Western Ghats of southern India may constitute a distinct subspecies.

== Behaviour and ecology ==
The lesser coucal is found singly or in pairs low in the undergrowth in marshy or grassy areas adjoining forest. They appear to be found mainly in lowlands. Like other coucals, they are not brood-parasitic cuckoos. They nest from May to September but mainly after the rains in June in India, building a dome of grass blades on a low tree. The usual clutch is 3 eggs in India, 2 in Southeast Asia and 4 in Taiwan. Both sexes incubate the eggs and care for the young.
