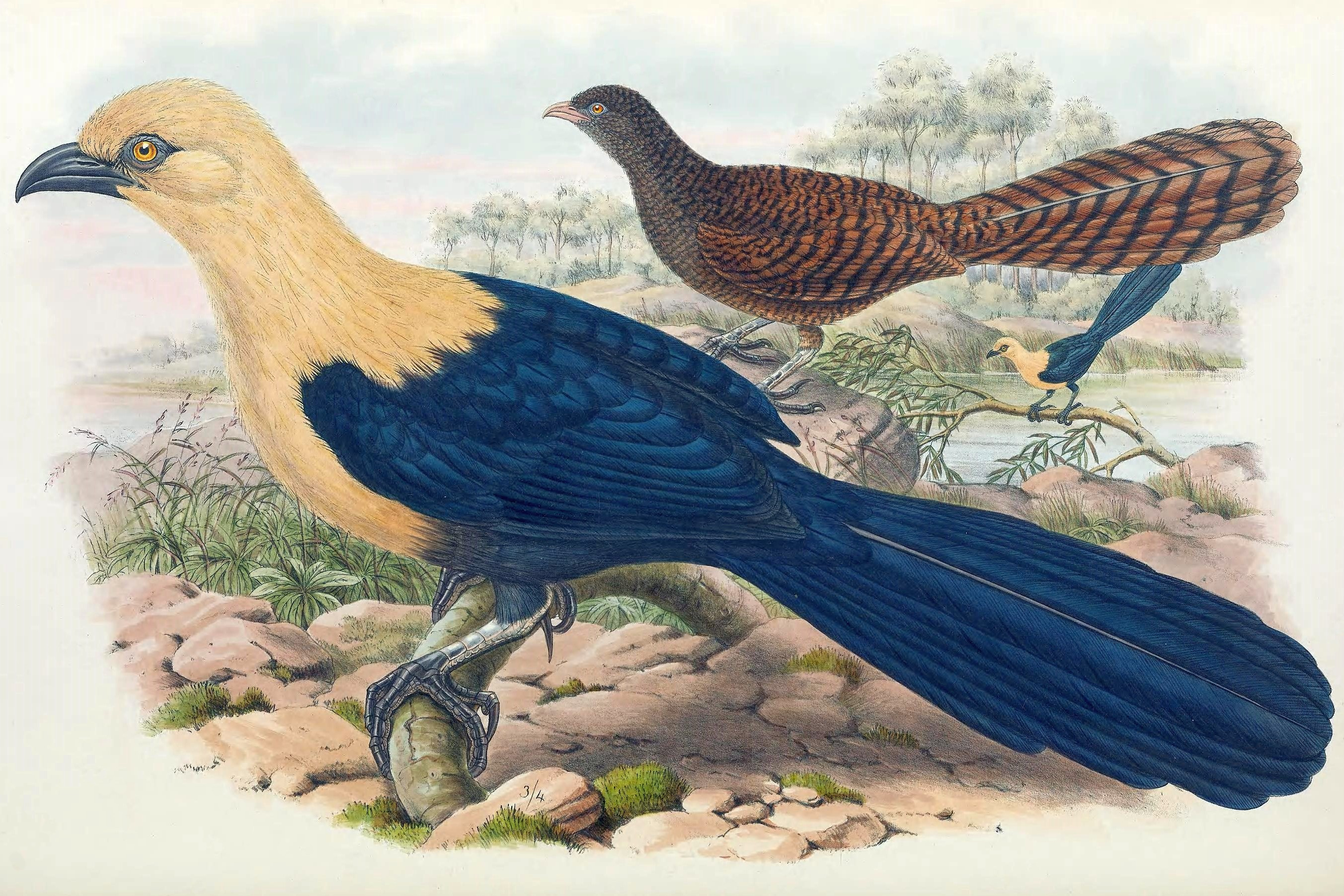

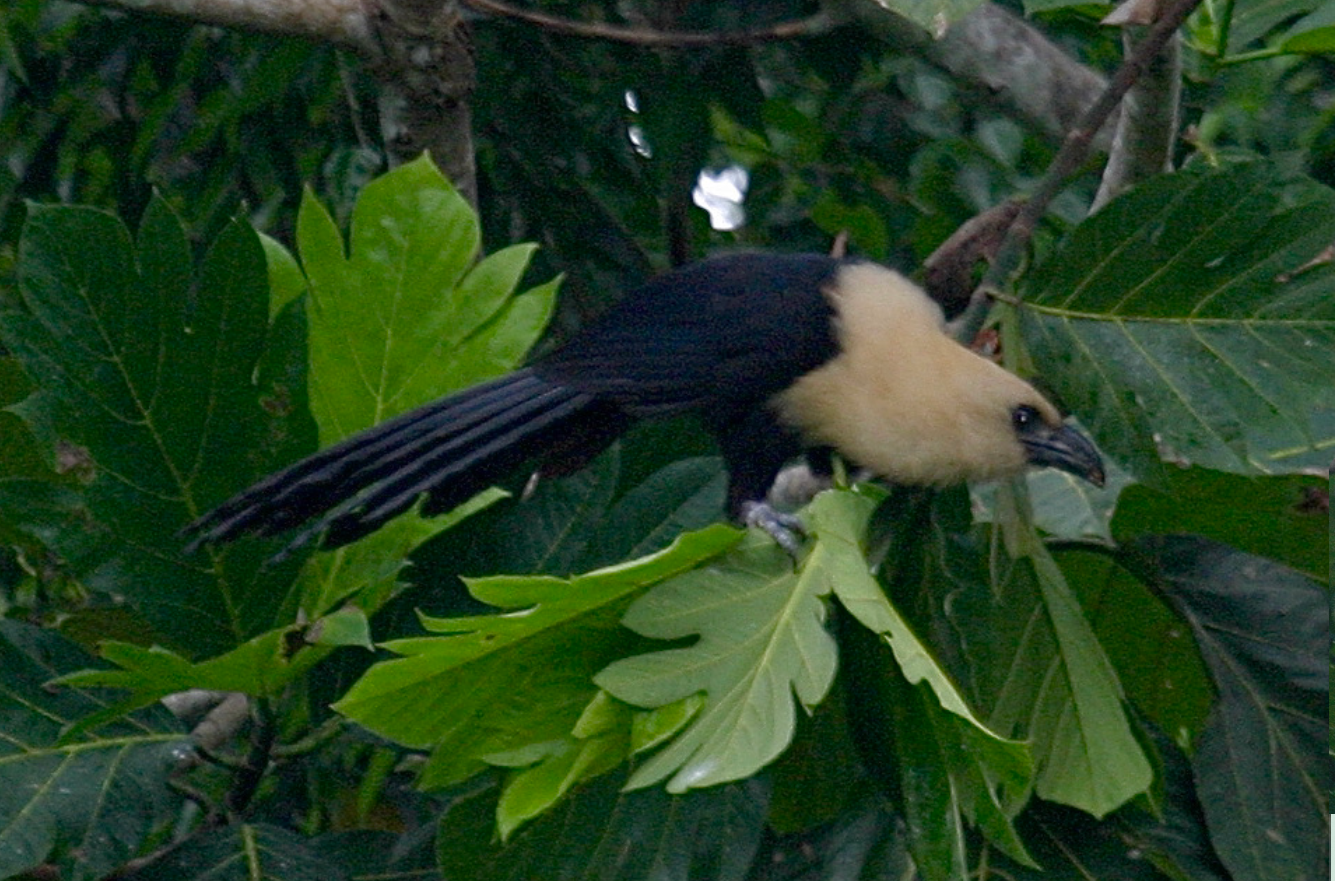

Conservation status
- Least Concern (IUCN 3.1)

Scientific classification
- Kingdom: Animalia
- Phylum: Chordata
- Class: Aves
- Order: Cuculiformes
- Family: Cuculidae
- Genus: Centropus
- Species: C. milo

Binomial name
- Centropus milo Gould, 1856
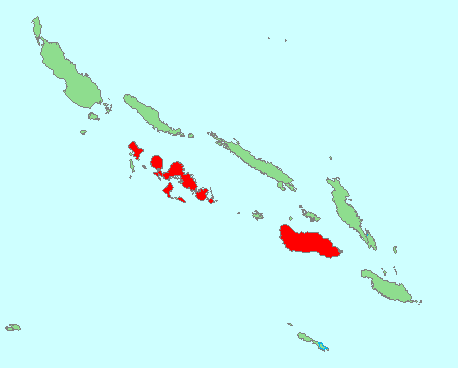
- Global range (In red)

= Buff-headed coucal =

Species of bird

The buff-headed coucal (Centropus milo) is a species of coucal. These are often placed in the cuckoo family (Cuculidae) but seem to warrant recognition as a distinct family. C. milo is a common endemic of the central islands of the Solomon Islands. Its natural habitat is tropical moist lowland and mountain forests, mostly in primary and secondary growth.

This species is a large cuckoo with a heavy bill and short wings. In total length, this species may measure 60 to 69 cm (24 to 27 in). With a body mass of 769 g (1.695 lb), this may be not only the largest coucal, apparently outweighing other very large coucals like the goliath coucal, but possibly the largest of all cuckoos, with a slightly higher cited weight than even the channel-billed cuckoo, usually considered the world's largest cuckoo. The plumage of adults is striking with a buff head, upper back and undersides, and glossy black wings, lower back and tail. The iris is red and legs and bill are dark grey. Juveniles are very differently colored, with the wings and tail reddish brown with black barring somewhat like in the allopatric pheasant coucal, and the rest of the plumage brown mottled with black. The iris is brown-grey and the bill is bicolored, brown above and pale horn below.

In local languages, the adult and juvenile are treated as different kinds of bird and each has a name of its own. For example, in Touo, Roviana and Marovo, the adult is called mozu, nao and ao, respectively, while the names for the juveniles are sagaza, sengenge and chehohu.
