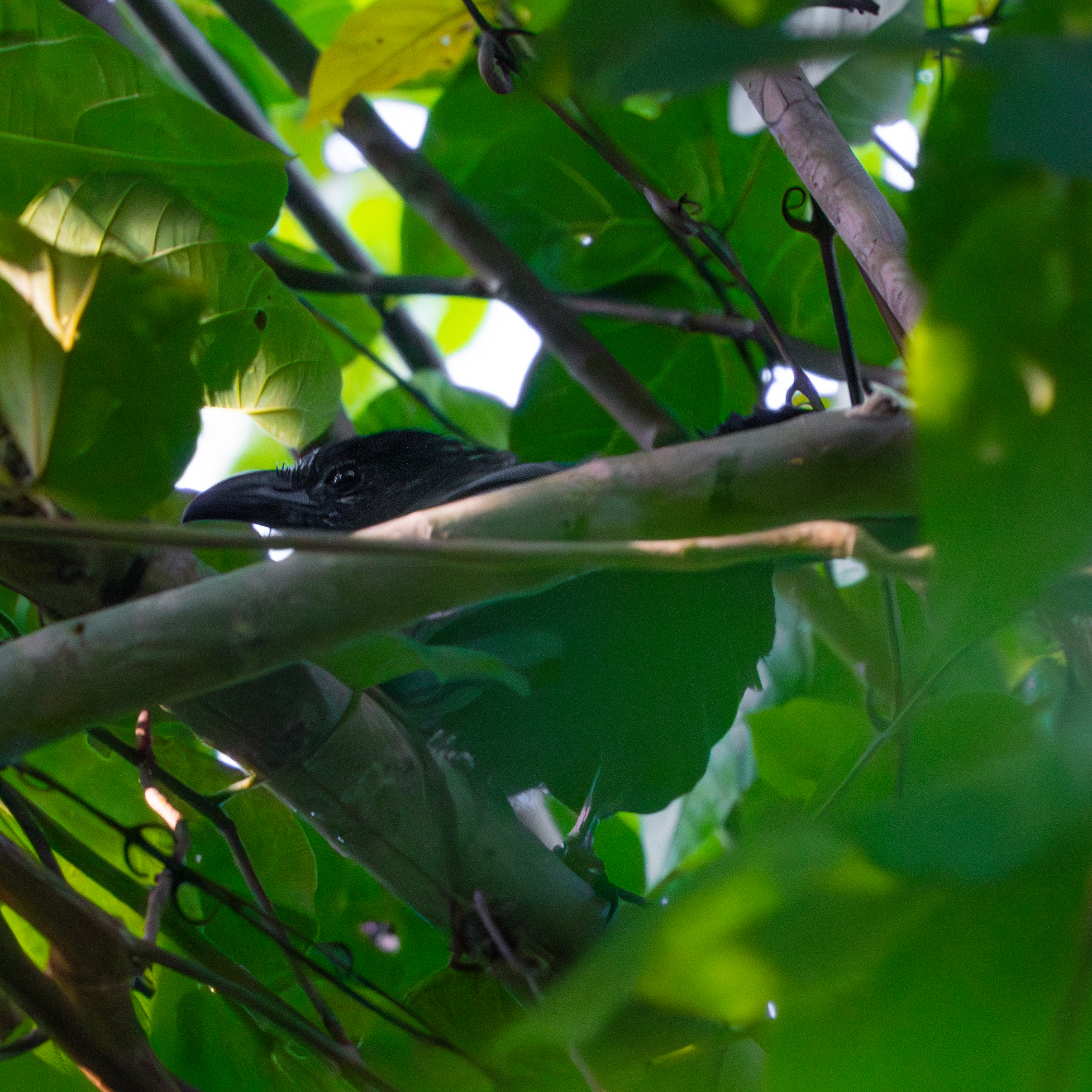

Conservation status
- Critically Endangered (IUCN 3.1)

Scientific classification
- Kingdom: Animalia
- Phylum: Chordata
- Class: Aves
- Order: Cuculiformes
- Family: Cuculidae
- Genus: Centropus
- Species: C. steerii

Binomial name
- Centropus steerii Bourns & Worcester, 1894

= Black-hooded coucal =

Species of bird

The black-hooded coucal (Centropus steerii) is a species of cuckoo in the family Cuculidae. It is endemic to Mindoro in the Philippines and is one of the most endangered birds in the country and is the only critically endangered coucal in the world. It is found in primary tropical lowland forest. It is threatened by habitat loss and trapping.

== Description and taxonomy ==
This species is described as a dark plummaged large long tailed bird found in the remaining lowland forests of Mindoro. It has a black head, brownish black wings, a brown throat. It also has a large bills especially in comparison to other coucal species.

While there are no sexual dimorphism in terms of plumage, females are around 20% larger than males.

Its call is a lound series of 5 to 9 hoots with the first note the loudest while the succeeding notes are slightly softer.

It is considered to be a sister species to the Black-faced coucal and the Short-toed coucal. It is monotypic.

== Ecology and behavior ==
Its diet has not yet been recorded at all but presumed to have the typical coucal diet of mostly insects and occasionally small reptiles and amphibians.

There is no information about its breeding habits and nesting.

== Habitat and conservation status ==
Its natural habitat is tropical moist lowland forest up to 750 meters above sea level where it frequents areas with tangled thickets and dense bamboo. It does not seem to be able to tolerate secondary growth where it is replaced by the Philippine coucal.

It is threatened by habitat loss with Mindoro having a great loss of forest in recent decades. By 1988, extensive deforestation on Mindoro had reduced forest cover to a mere 120 km^{2} (46 sq mi), of which only a small proportion is below this species's upper altitudinal limit. The lowland forest that does remain is highly fragmented and it is believed that at the current rate of deforestation all forest may disappear by 2020–2030. Slash-and-burn cultivation, occasional selective logging and rattan collection threaten the forest fragments that still support the species. Dynamite blasting for marble is an additional threat to forest at Puerto Galera. The species's genetic viability may be at risk given the small size and fragmented nature of remaining populations. As a consequence, it is now classified as critically endangered by the IUCN with an estimated population of just 50 - 249 mature individuals.

It occurs in a few protected areas such as the Mount Calavite Wildlife Sanctuary, Mounts Iglit–Baco Natural Park, Mount Halcon and most importantly the Sablayan Penal Colony which is the known stronghold for this species. Unfortunately, while protected on paper, actual protection from illegal logging and hunting are lax.

In order to combat extinction, in 2008 local education programs have been initiated and surveys have been executed, and ecotourism has been promoted in order to encourage locals to take to more sustainable occupations. The Zoological Society of London has described the bird as an EDGE species, listed as the top 21, based on evolutionary distinctiveness and its risk of extinction However, this coucal's population and habitat continue to decrease and shrink closer to extinction.

Conservation actions proposed by the IUCN include more surveys to better understand population, to better protect the remaining lowland forests and to raise awareness on this species.
