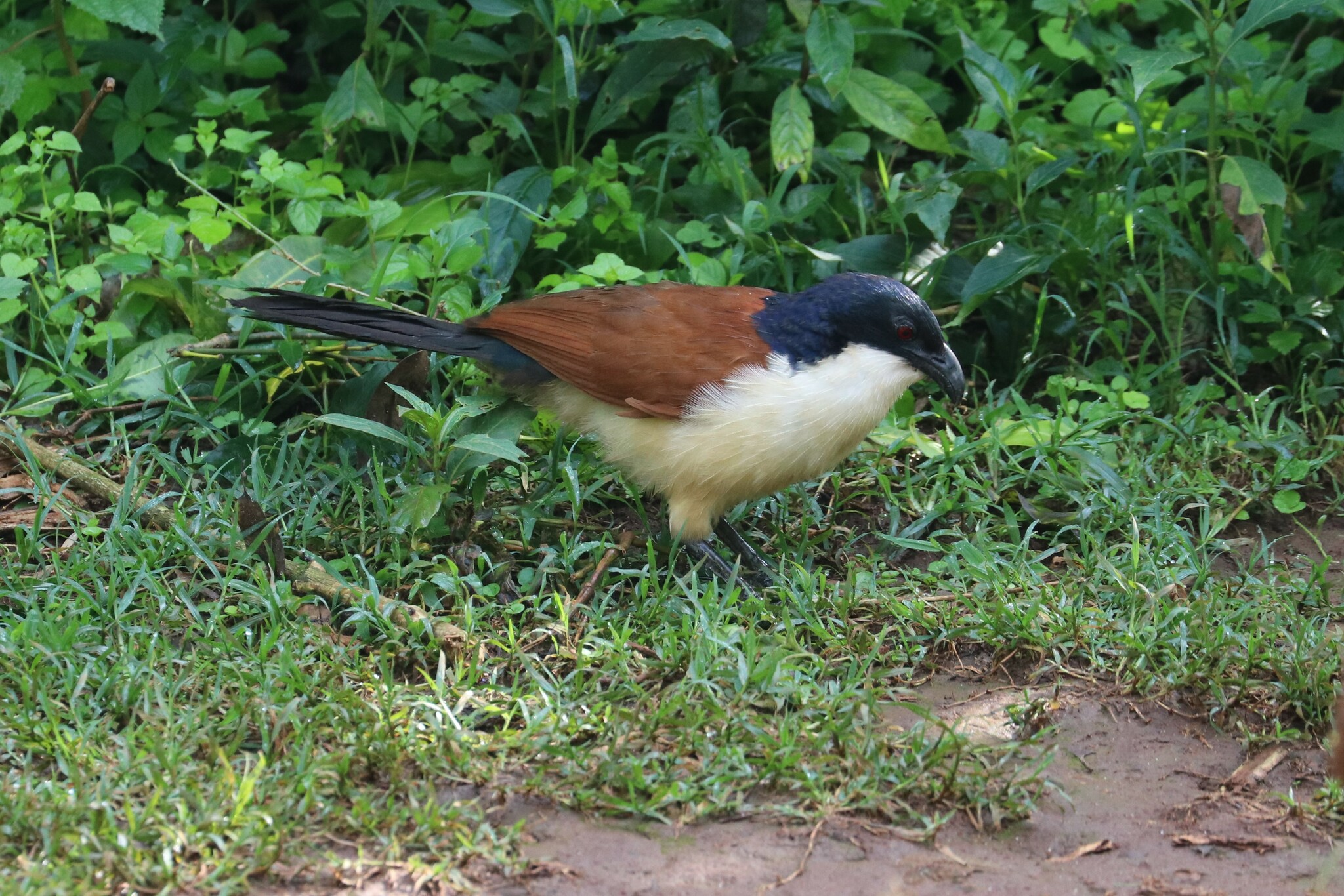

Conservation status
- Least Concern (IUCN 3.1)

Scientific classification
- Kingdom: Animalia
- Phylum: Chordata
- Class: Aves
- Order: Cuculiformes
- Family: Cuculidae
- Genus: Centropus
- Species: C. monachus

Binomial name
- Centropus monachus Rüppell, 1837

= Blue-headed coucal =

Species of bird

The blue-headed coucal (Centropus monachus) is a species of cuckoo in the family Cuculidae. It is native to tropical central Africa where its typical habitat is swamps, river banks, forest edges and generally wet locations. It is a common bird with a wide range, and the International Union for Conservation of Nature has rated its conservation status as being of "least concern".

== Description ==
The blue-headed coucal is a medium-sized species growing to 45 to 52 cm (18 to 20 in) in length. The sexes are similar, the adult having the head, sides of neck and back black, glossed with blue, the lower back and rump black, the wings predominantly deep chestnut and the tail black, glossed with green or bronze. The underparts are white or pale buff. The eyes are dark red, the beak black and the legs and feet greyish-black. The juvenile is similar to the adult but the black areas are dull rather than glossy; the head is streaked with rufous-buff, the wings are dark chestnut heavily barred with dark brown, and the back and tail are barred with buff. The throat and breast feathers are spotted with black.

== Distribution and habitat ==
The blue-headed coucal occurs in tropical central Africa at altitudes of up to 3,000 m (9,800 ft), generally at higher altitudes than the Senegal coucal (Centropus senegalensis). It is found in Angola, Benin, Burundi, Cameroon, Central African Republic, Chad, Republic of the Congo, Democratic Republic of the Congo, Ivory Coast, Equatorial Guinea, Eritrea, Ethiopia, Gabon, Ghana, Guinea, Guinea-Bissau, Kenya, Liberia, Mali, Nigeria, Rwanda, Sudan, Tanzania, Togo, and Uganda. Its habitat is swamps and marshes, tall grassland, river banks, wet savannah, plantations, secondary growth forest, farmland and villages.
