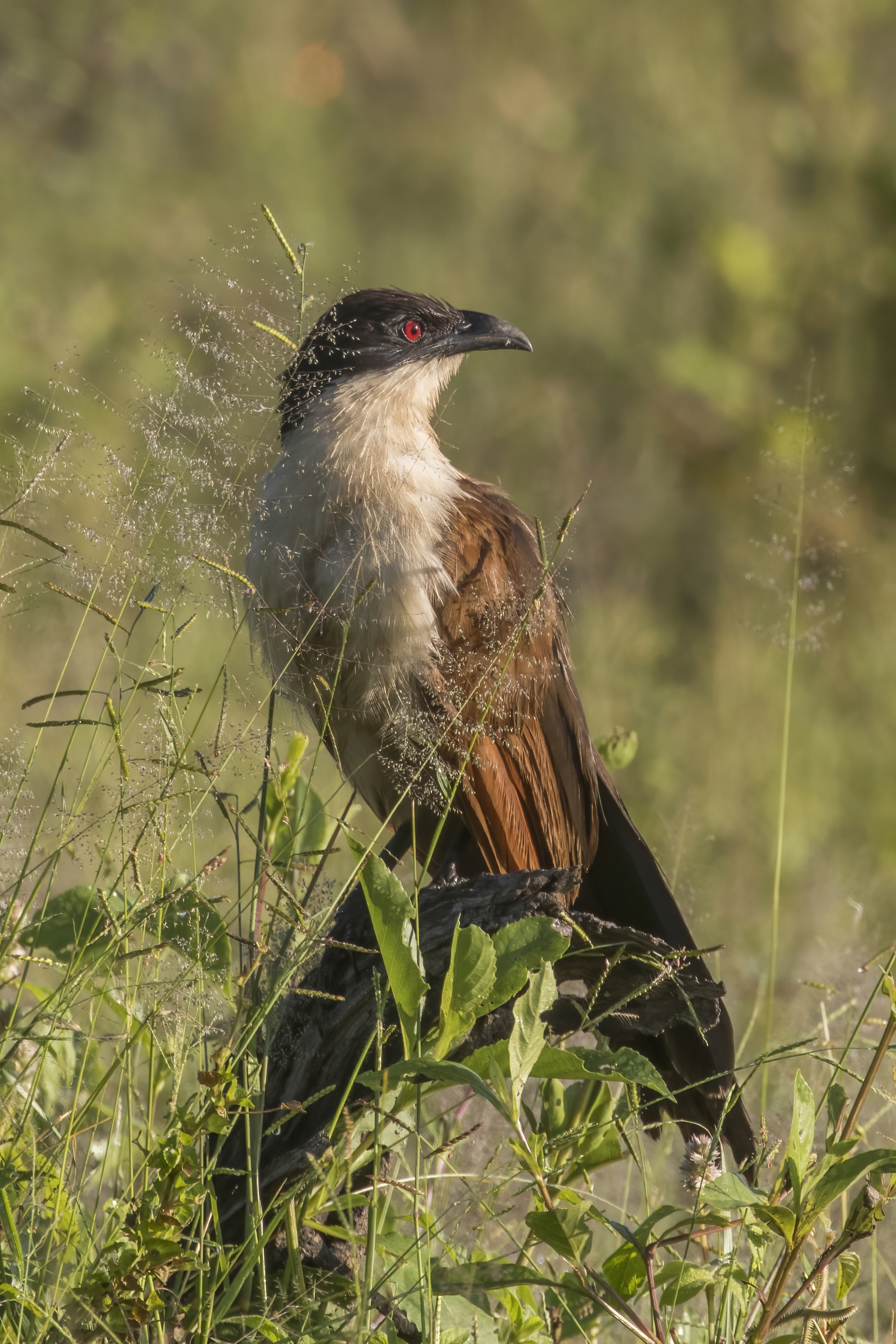
- Matetsi Safari Area, Zimbabwe

Conservation status
- Least Concern (IUCN 3.1)

Scientific classification
- Kingdom: Animalia
- Phylum: Chordata
- Class: Aves
- Order: Cuculiformes
- Family: Cuculidae
- Genus: Centropus
- Species: C. cupreicaudus

Binomial name
- Centropus cupreicaudus Reichenow, 1896

= Coppery-tailed coucal =

Species of bird

The coppery-tailed coucal (Centropus cupreicaudus) is a species of cuckoo in the family Cuculidae. It is found in Angola, Botswana, the Democratic Republic of the Congo, Malawi, Namibia, Tanzania, Zambia, and Zimbabwe. It was first described by the German ornithologist Anton Reichenow in 1896.

== Description ==
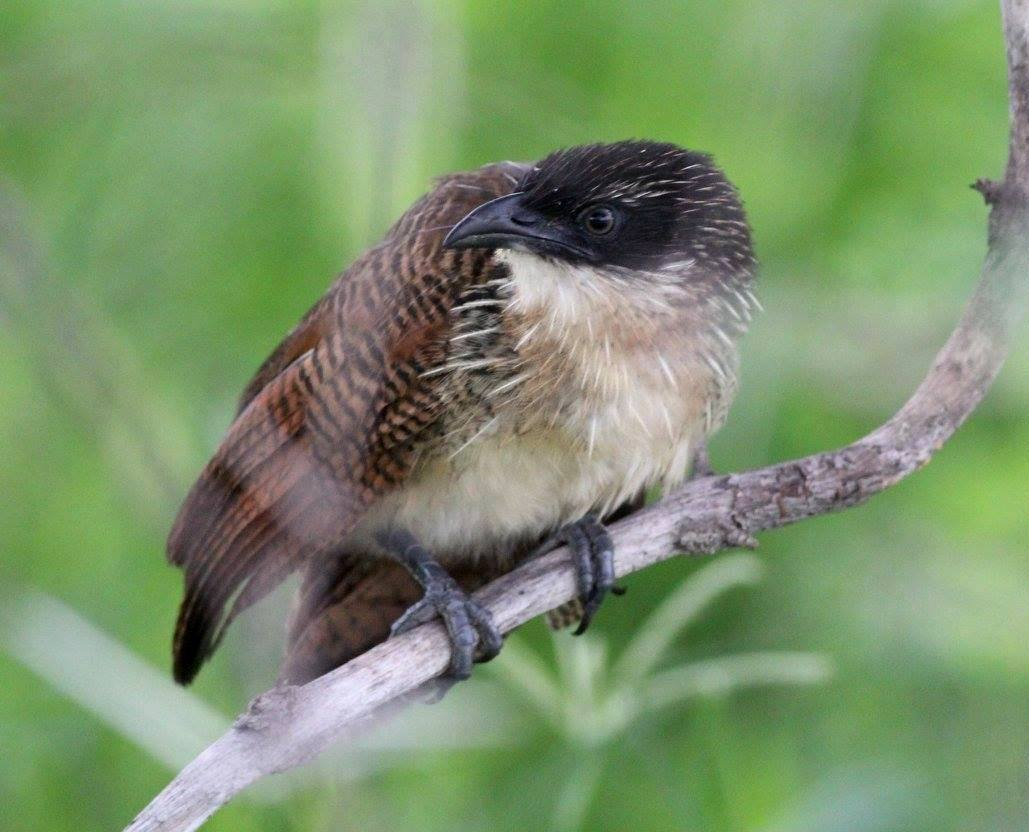
Immature bird in Mahango Game Park, Namibia

An adult coppery-tailed coucal is about 48 cm (19 in) long and has a curved beak and long, broad tail. Males are slightly smaller than females. The coppery-tailed coucal's plumage is similar to that of the Senegal coucal (Centropus senegalensis). It has a black head and upperparts, white or cream-coloured underparts, a brown rump with a coppery-sheen and a blackish-brown tail. Immature birds have pale streaks on the head and their flight feathers are barred. The call of the coppery-tailed coucal consists of deep, bubbling notes.

== Distribution and habitat ==
The coppery-tailed coucal is native to parts of south central Africa. Its range stretches from Angola in the west to southwestern Tanzania, northern Botswana and the Caprivi Strip in Namibia. Its typical habitat is swampland and dense vegetation near rivers, but it is also found on inundated floodplains and near seasonal lakes. The total size of its range is around 1,750,000 square kilometres (680,000 sq mi).

== Behaviour ==
The coppery-tailed coucal is territorial throughout the year and is mostly active soon after dawn and in the evening. It forages on land and feeds on amphibians, fish, small birds, reptiles and rodents as well as such invertebrate prey as grasshoppers, crabs and snails. It scavenges for dead fish and other edible matter and eats some green plant food. It tears open the nests of weaver birds (Ploceus spp.) and sometimes swallows blue quail (Coturnix adansonii) whole. The breeding season occurs from January to March and the bird is believed to be monogamous. A domed nest, built of grasses, reed fragments and twigs and lined with leaves, is constructed low down among reeds or in tangled waterside vegetation. Both parents are involved in nesting activities but the male may play the larger role. A clutch of two to four eggs is laid and incubation starts as soon as the first egg is laid, which is sometimes before the nest has been completed. The eggs hatch at intervals and both parents care for the young. The chicks are fed on such foods as frogs and locusts. The young leave the nest when about seventeen days old, sometimes when part grown and not yet able to fly.

== Status ==
The coppery-tailed coucal has a very wide range and although the population has not been quantified, it is common in some parts of the range. The population trend seems stable. For these reasons, the IUCN has listed its conservation status as "Least concern".
