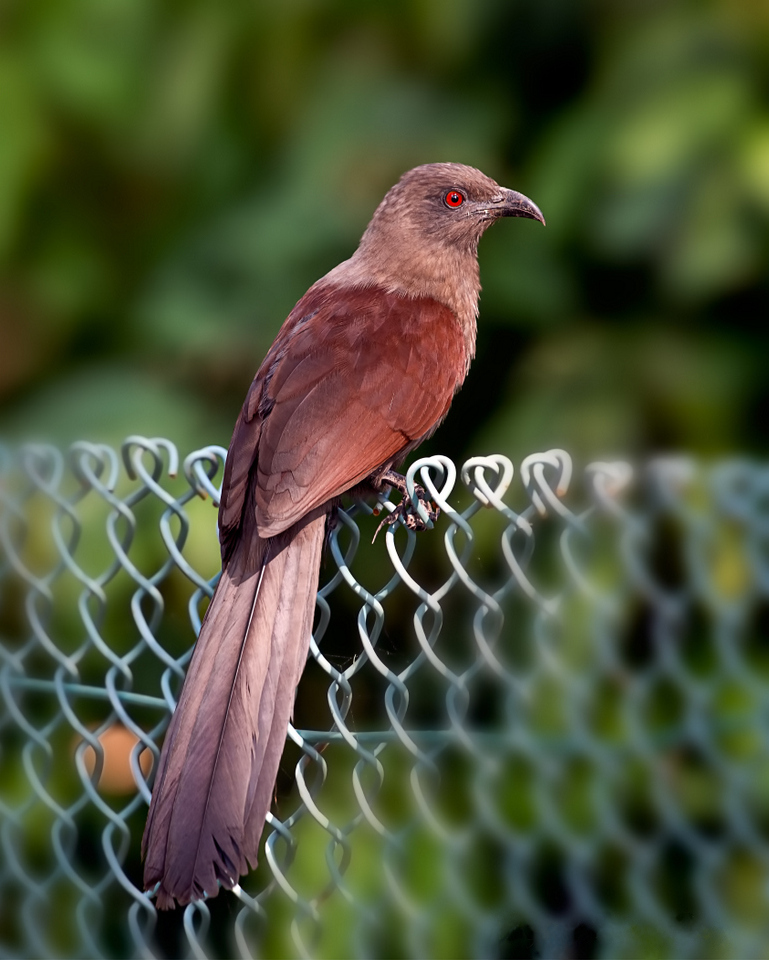

Conservation status
- Least Concern (IUCN 3.1)

Scientific classification
- Kingdom: Animalia
- Phylum: Chordata
- Class: Aves
- Order: Cuculiformes
- Family: Cuculidae
- Genus: Centropus
- Species: C. andamanensis

Binomial name
- Centropus andamanensis Beavan, 1867

Synonyms
- Centropus sinensis andamanensis

= Andaman coucal =

Species of bird

The Andaman coucal or brown coucal (Centropus andamanensis) is a species of non-parasitic cuckoo found in the Andamans, Coco and Table Islands. It is sometimes treated as a subspecies of the greater coucal. It is found mainly in forested habitats and thickly covered gardens.

== Description ==
It is a large coucal, with males being around 380–400 mm (12.6-15.7 inches) and females somewhat larger at 400–420 mm (15.7-16.5 inches) in length. Structurally, it closely resembles the greater coucal (Centropus sinensis), except that its plumage is a fawn brown as opposed to the black with bluish-purple sheen seen in C. sinensis. It has a chestnut rear mantle and wings and the head is pale tawny brown. The mantle and breast grade from pale to dark brown on the belly and vent. The iris is pale brown. The tail is a pale brown at the base and dark violet-brown towards the tip. The tail feathers have conspicuous black shafts. The juvenile shows slight barring on the body, especially on the underside.

== Taxonomy and systematics ==
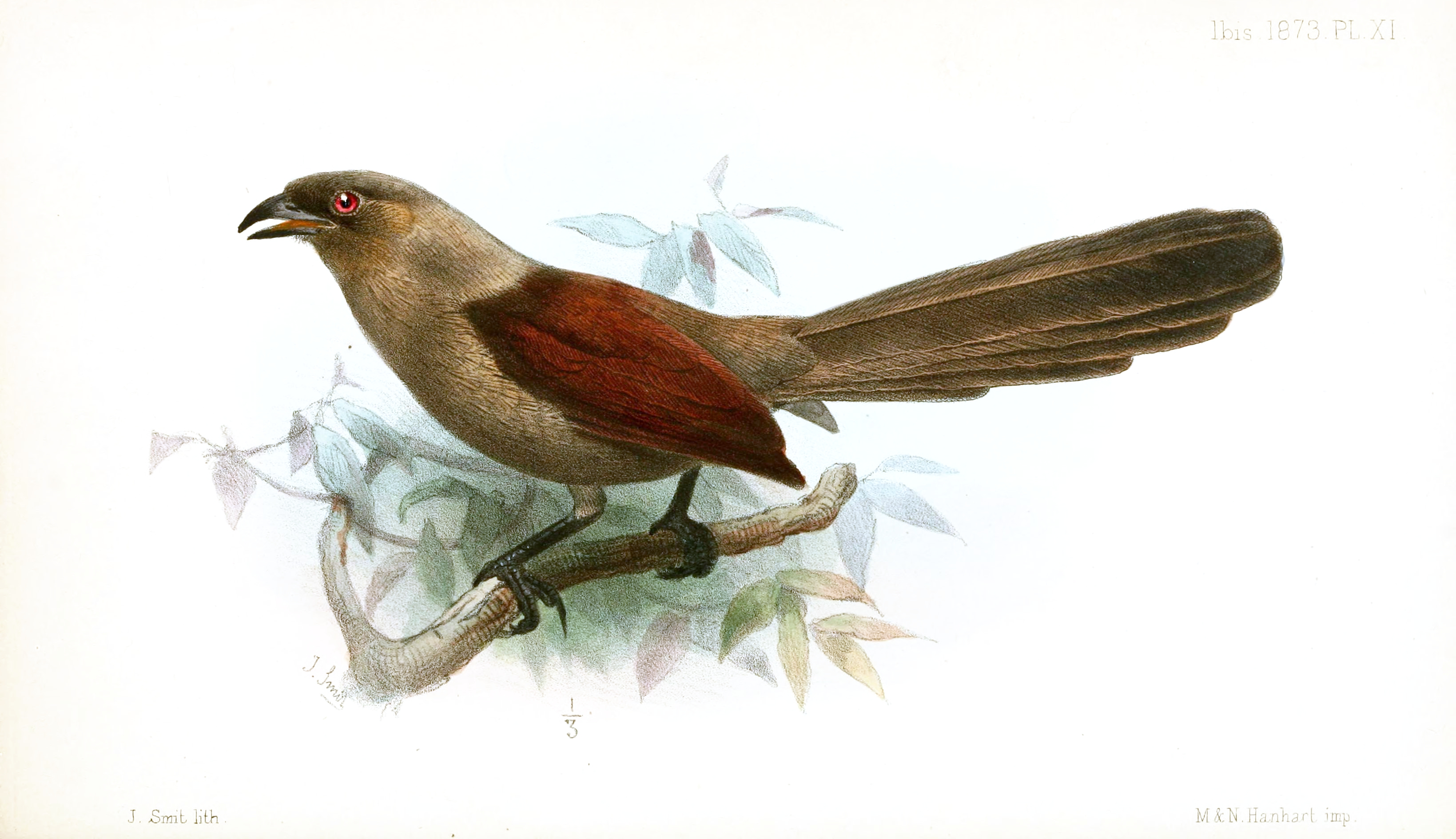
Illustration by Joseph Smit (1873)

This species was first described as Centropus andamanensis (toponym after its distribution) by R.C. Tytler, although his notes were published by R.C. Beavan in 1867. Stuart Baker (1927) continued to treat it as a species but Ripley (1961) and Ali and Ripley (1969) included it as a subspecies of Centropus sinensis. This is justified by the treatment of another species with a brown form in the Kangean Islands, Centropus sinensis kangeangensis. Peters considered it doubtful as a subspecies and noted a structural resemblance to the Sri Lankan Centropus chlororhynchus. Rasmussen and Anderton (2005) consider it a valid species on the basis of distinct vocalization and also suggest elevation of the Kangean form and further study of Centropus sinensis.

== Distribution and habitat ==
It is mainly found in the Andamans (at least South, North and associated islets) as well as on the nearby Coco Islands and Table Island, which belong to Myanmar. It is common in forests and in disturbed areas including gardens, forest and edge, mangroves, edges of paddy fields.

== Behaviour and ecology ==
It breeds during the monsoon (May through July). The nest is made of twigs, grass and leaves and is placed well above the ground in a tree. The usual clutch is two or three.

The song is much like that of the greater coucal, consisting of a long series of very deep and resonant hoop notes. The notes however rise abruptly in pitch. It is also known to produce chuckling and grating calls.

Feeds on all kinds of insects, small frogs, crabs and lizards.

== Gallery ==
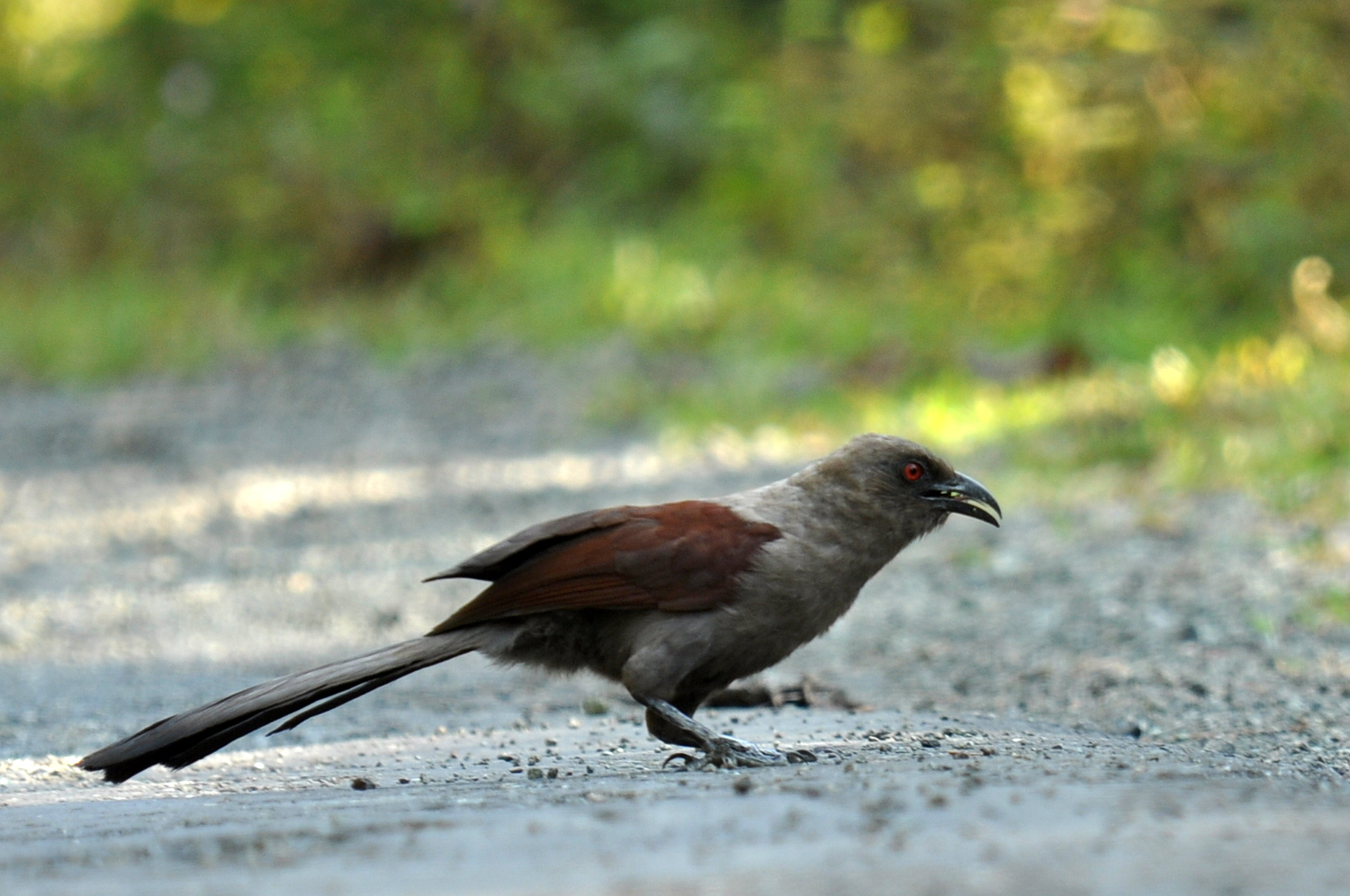
Andaman coucal in North Andaman Island

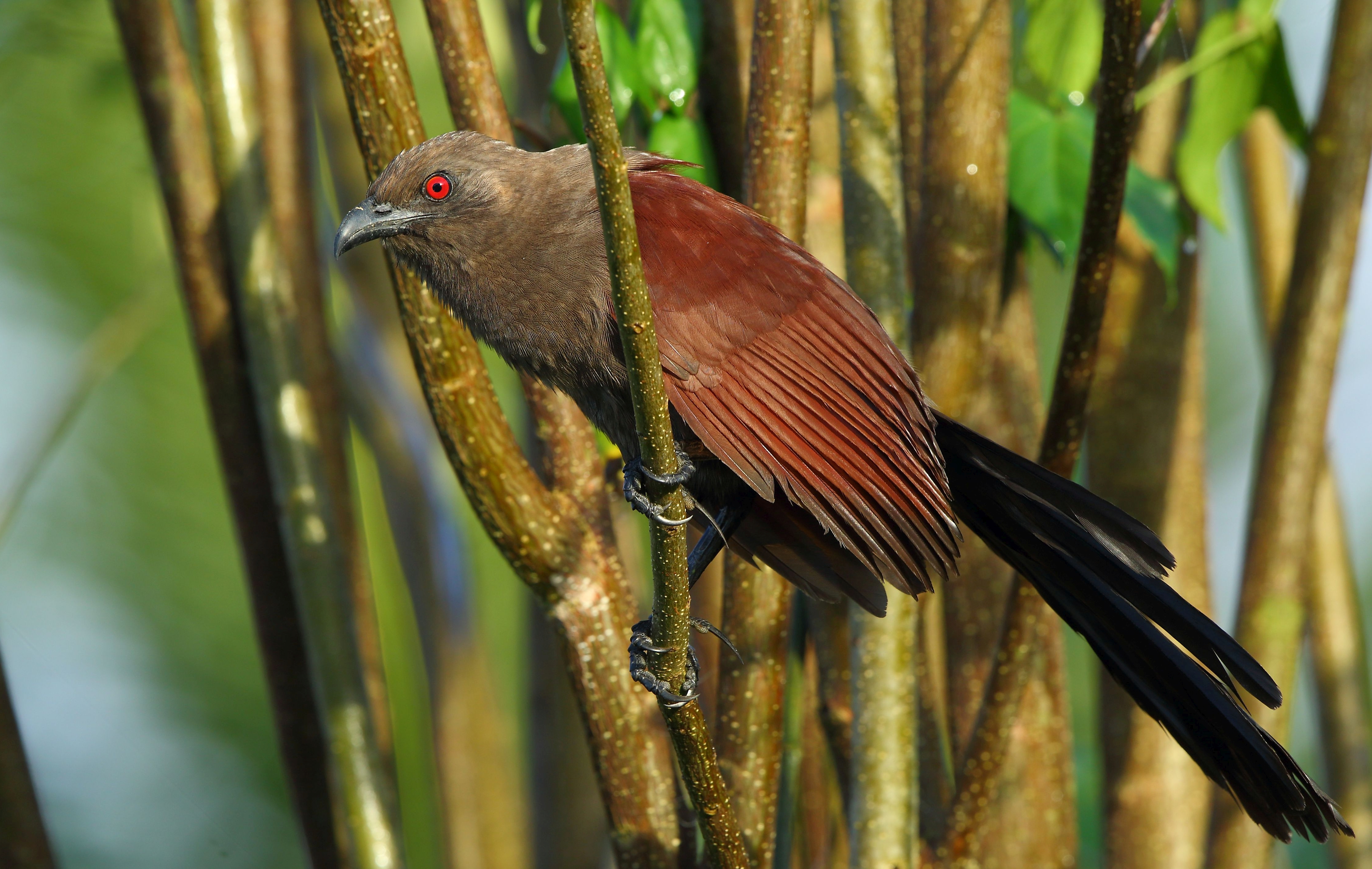
