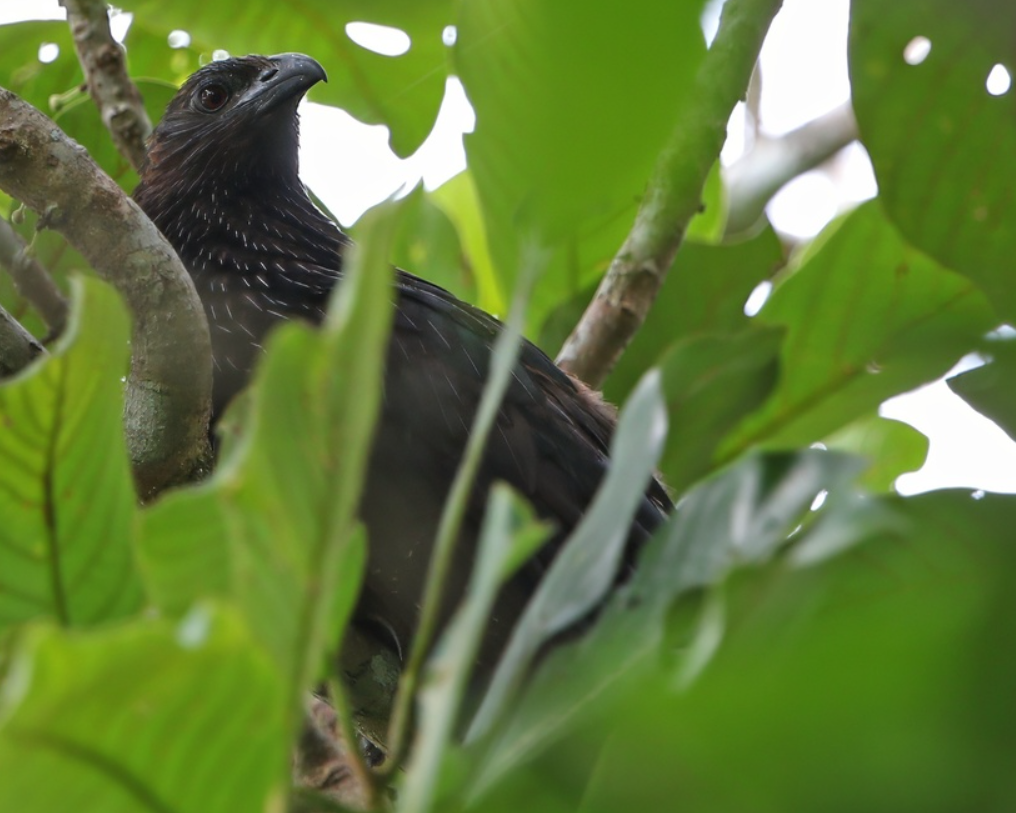

Conservation status
- Least Concern (IUCN 3.1)

Scientific classification
- Kingdom: Animalia
- Phylum: Chordata
- Class: Aves
- Order: Cuculiformes
- Family: Cuculidae
- Genus: Centropus
- Species: C. spilopterus

Binomial name
- Centropus spilopterus G.R. Gray, 1858

Synonyms
- Centropus phasianinus spilopterus

= Kai coucal =

Species of bird

The Kai coucal (Centropus spilopterus) is a species of cuckoo in the family Cuculidae. It is endemic to the Kai Islands of Indonesia. It was formerly considered a subspecies of the pheasant coucal (C. phasianus).
