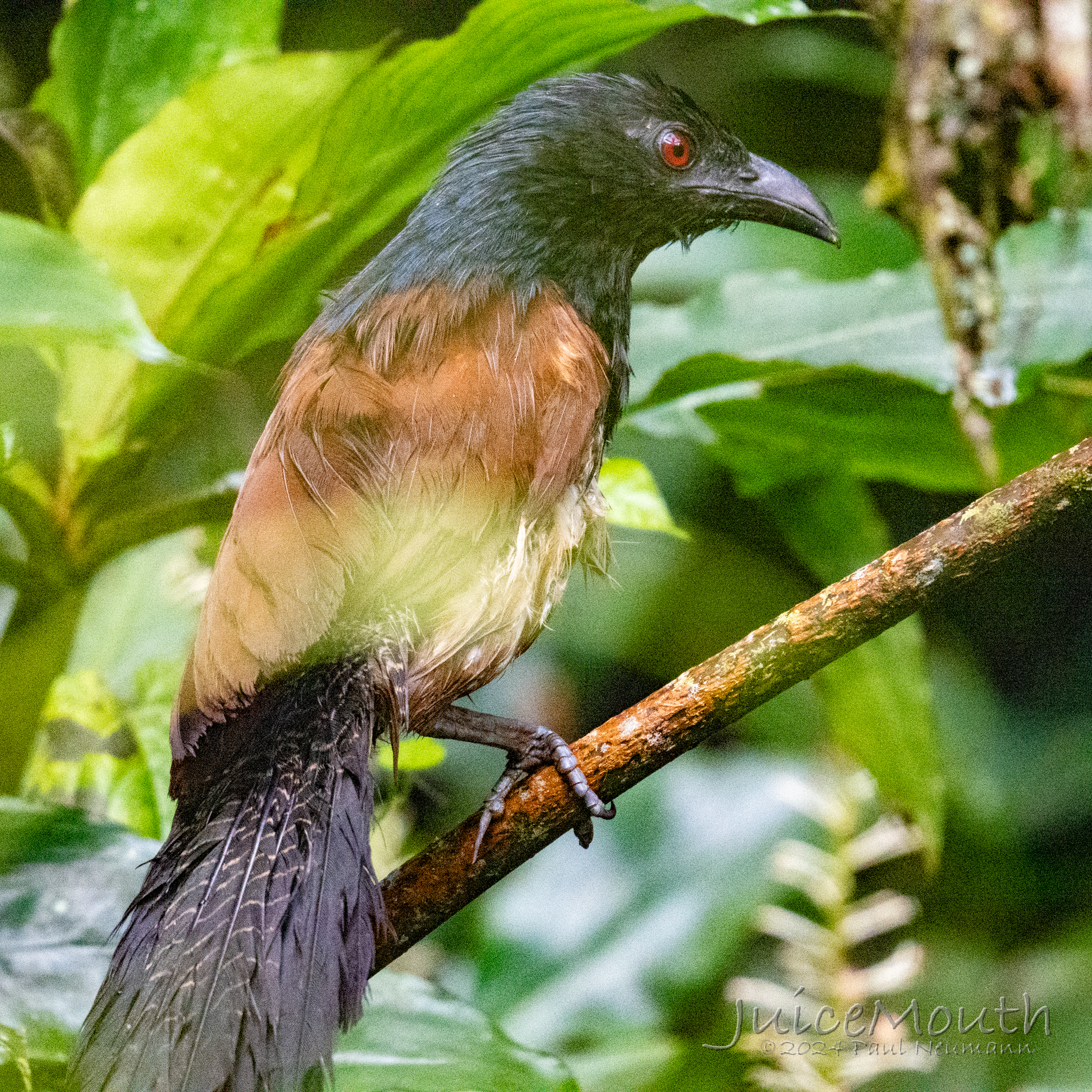

Conservation status
- Least Concern (IUCN 3.1)

Scientific classification
- Kingdom: Animalia
- Phylum: Chordata
- Class: Aves
- Order: Cuculiformes
- Family: Cuculidae
- Genus: Centropus
- Species: C. leucogaster

Binomial name
- Centropus leucogaster (Leach, 1814)

= Black-throated coucal =

Species of bird

The black-throated coucal (Centropus leucogaster) is a species of cuckoo in the family Cuculidae. It is found in West Africa in dense second growth along forest edge and grassy swamps. The subspecies found in northern and central Zaire is sometimes split as Neumann's coucal (Centropus neumanni).

== Description ==
The black-throated coucal is the largest species in the genus Centropus, growing to 46 to 58 cm (18 to 23 in) in length. The sexes are similar, the adult having the head, neck, upper breast and mantle black, glossed with violet-blue, the wings rufous-chestnut, the back black barred with white and the tail black, the tail feathers having paler bases. The lower breast and belly are white, the thighs, flanks and undertail-coverts having a rufous tinge. The juvenile has somewhat similar plumage to the adult, but is barred and streaked with buff, and lacks the gloss on the head.

== Distribution and habitat ==
The black-throated coucal is native to western Africa. Its range includes Cameroon, The Democratic Republic of Congo, Côte d'Ivoire, Gabon, Ghana, Guinea, Guinea-Bissau, Liberia, Niger, Nigeria, Senegal, Sierra Leone, and Togo. Its typical habitat is the edges of secondary forest, clearings, undergrowth, rough grassland, the edges of marshes, savannah, and the strips of gallery forest beside rivers. It is not usually found above 1,000 m (3,300 ft).

== Ecology ==
The black-throated coucal is a skulking bird, being reluctant to emerge from the undergrowth. It feeds on or near the ground, the diet consisting of insects, spiders and small frogs. The nest is a ball of dried grasses and leaves lined with green leaves and about 30 cm (12 in) in diameter. It is built close to the ground in a bush or tussock of grass. The two white eggs are probably incubated by the male, but the nesting habits of this bird have been little studied.
