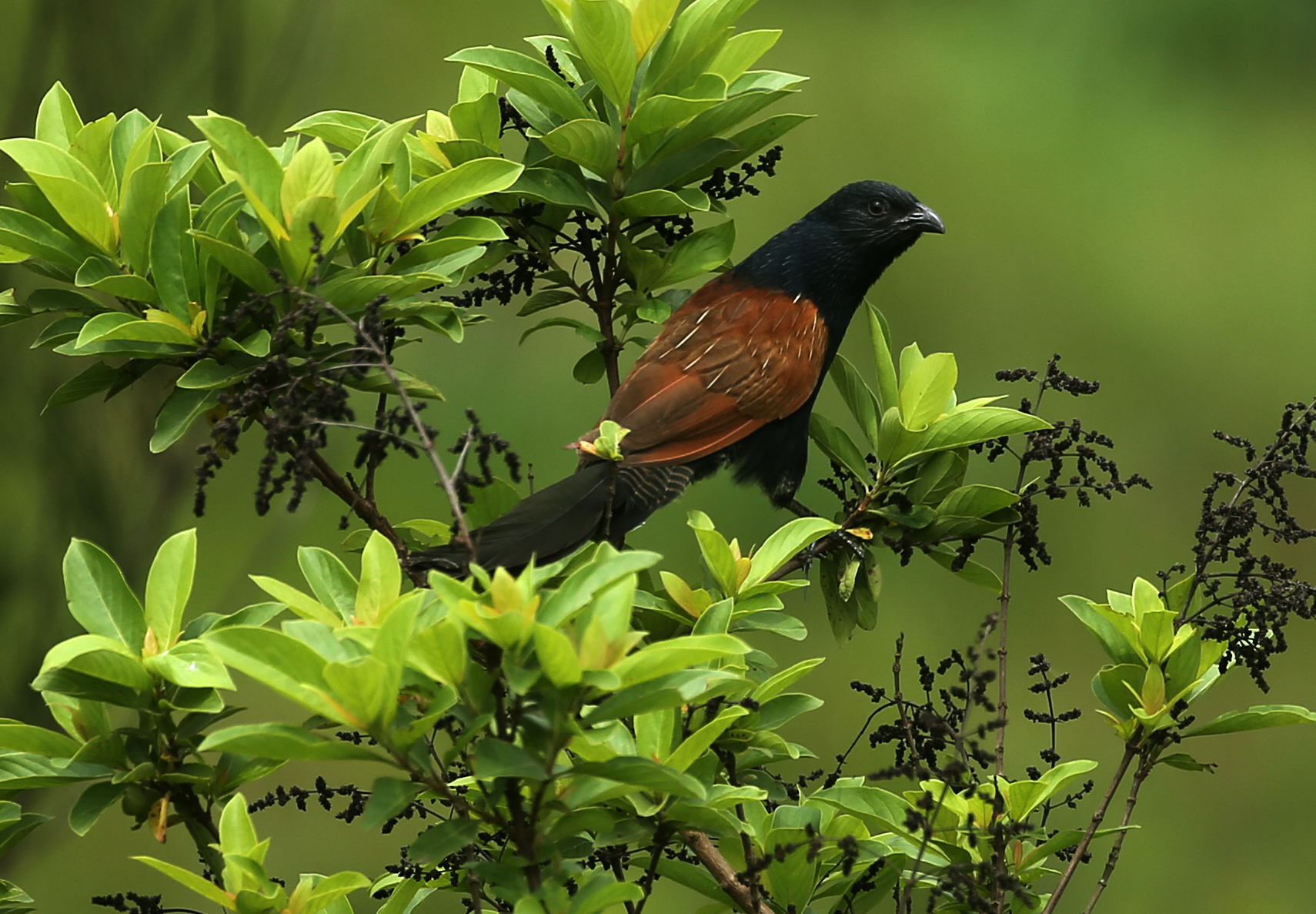
- Lesser coucal (Centropus bengalensis)

Scientific classification
- Kingdom: Animalia
- Phylum: Chordata
- Class: Aves
- Order: Cuculiformes
- Family: Cuculidae; Horsfield, 1823
- Genus: Centropus; Illiger, 1811

Type species
- Cuculus aegyptius (Senegal coucal) Linnaeus, 1766

Species
- About 30, see list

= Coucal =

Coucals

Genus of birds

A coucal is one of about 30 species of birds in the cuckoo family. All of them belong in the subfamily Centropodinae and the genus Centropus. Unlike many Old World cuckoos, coucals are not brood parasites, though they do have their own reproductive peculiarity: all members of the genus are (to varying degrees) sex-role reversed, so that the smaller male provides most of the parental care. Male pheasant coucals (Centropus phasianinus) invest in building the nest, incubate for the most part and take a major role in feeding the young. At least one coucal species, the black coucal, is polyandrous.

== Taxonomy ==
The genus Centropus was introduced in 1811 by the German zoologist Johann Karl Wilhelm Illiger. The type species was subsequently designated as the Senegal coucal by George Robert Gray in 1840. The genus name combines the Ancient Greek kentron meaning "spur" or "spike" with pous meaning "foot".

== Description ==
Many coucals have a long claw on their hind toe (hallux). The feet have minute spurs and this is responsible for the German term for coucals Sporenkuckucke. The common name is perhaps derived from the French coucou and alouette (for the long lark like claw). (Cuvier, in Newton 1896) The length of the claw can be about 68-76% of the tarsus length in the African black coucal C. grillii and lesser coucal C. bengalensis. Only the short-toed coucal C. rectunguis is an exception with the hallux claw of only 23% of the tarsus length. Thread like feather structures (elongated sheaths of the growing feathers that are sometimes termed trichoptiles) are found on the head and neck of hatchlings and can be as long as 20mm. Nestlings can look spiny. Many are opportunistic predators, Centropus phasianus is known to attack birds caught in mist nets while white-browed coucals Centropus superciliosus are attracted to smoke from grass fires where they forage for insects and small mammals escaping from the fire.

Coucals generally make nests inside dense vegetation and they usually have the top covered but some species have the top open. Pheasant coucal Centropus phasianinus, greater coucal C. sinensis and Madagascar coucal C. toulou sometimes build an open nest while some species always build open nests (the bay coucal C. celebensis)

Some coucal species have been seen to fly while carrying their young.

== Species ==
The genus contains 29 species:

Image	Scientific name	Common name	Distribution
-	Centropus milo	Buff-headed coucal	Solomon Islands
-	Centropus ateralbus	White-necked coucal	Bismarck Archipelago
-	Centropus menbeki	Ivory-billed coucal	Aru Islands and New Guinea
-	Centropus chalybeus	Biak coucal	Biak
	Centropus unirufus	Rufous coucal	Luzon
-	Centropus chlororhynchos	Green-billed coucal	Sri Lanka lowland rain forests
	Centropus melanops	Black-faced coucal	southern Philippines
-	Centropus steerii	Black-hooded coucal	Mindoro
-	Centropus rectunguis	Short-toed coucal	Malesia
-	Centropus celebensis	Bay coucal	Sulawesi
-	Centropus anselli	Gabon coucal	Congolian rainforests
-	Centropus leucogaster	Black-throated coucal	Guineo-Congolian region
	Centropus senegalensis	Senegal coucal	lower Nile valley and Sub-Saharan Africa
-	Centropus monachus	Blue-headed coucal	northern sub-Saharan Africa
	Centropus cupreicaudus	Coppery-tailed coucal	miombo and adjacent areas
	Centropus superciliosus	White-browed coucal	Sub-Saharan Africa
	Centropus burchellii	Burchell's coucal	miombo and adjacent areas
-	Centropus nigrorufus	Sunda coucal	Java
	Centropus sinensis	Greater coucal	Indomalayan realm
	Centropus toulou	Malagasy coucal	Seychelles and Madagascar
	Centropus goliath	Goliath coucal	North Maluku
-	Centropus grillii	Black coucal	Sub-Saharan Africa
-	Centropus viridis	Philippine coucal	Philippines
	Centropus bengalensis	Lesser coucal	Indomalayan realm
-	Centropus violaceus	Violaceous coucal	Bismarck Archipelago
-	Centropus bernsteini	Black-billed coucal	New Guinea
-	Centropus spilopterus	Kai coucal	Kai Islands
	Centropus phasianinus	Pheasant coucal	Timor, Australia and New Guinea
	Centropus andamanensis	Andaman coucal	Andaman Islands
