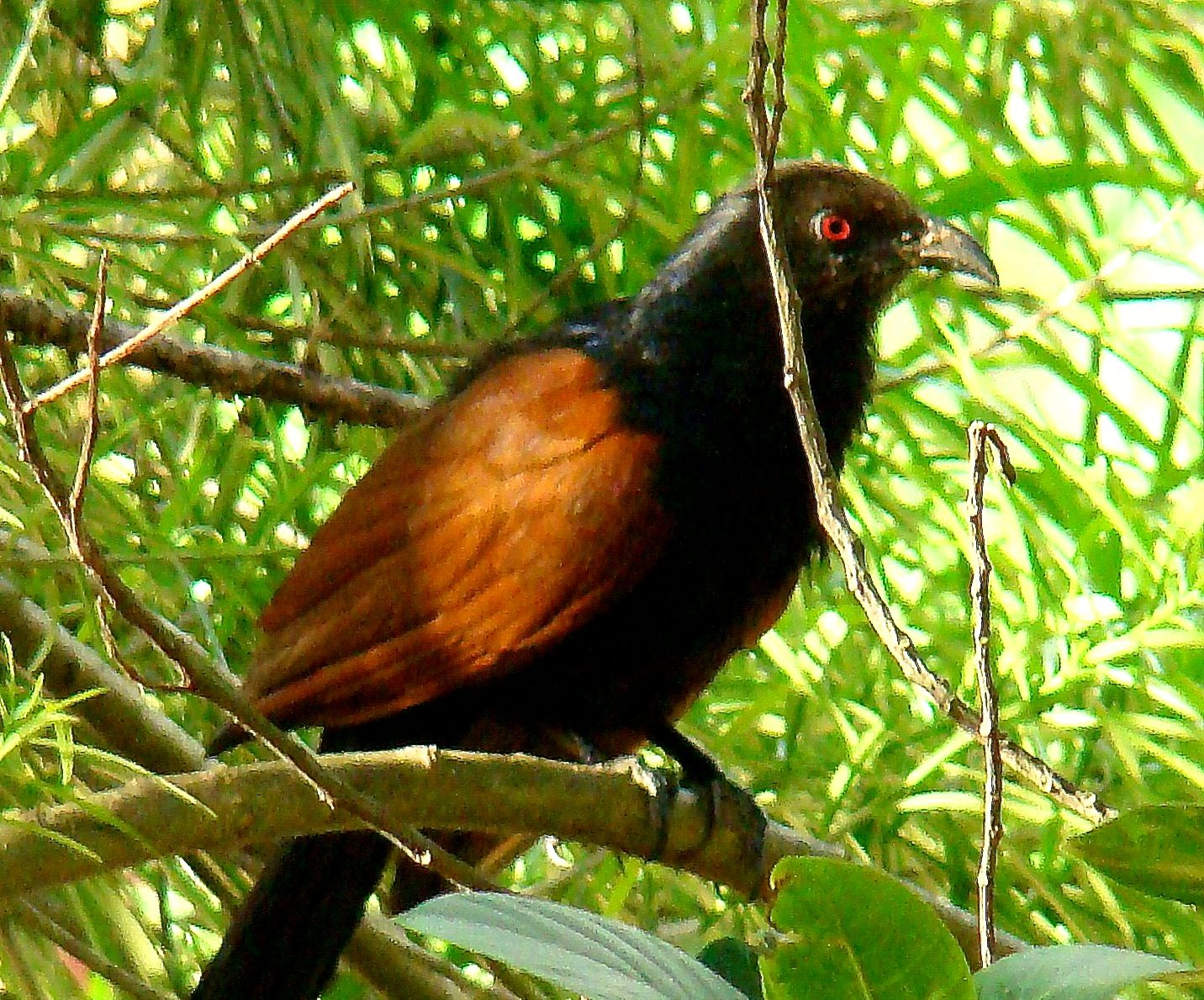

Conservation status
- Vulnerable (IUCN 3.1)

Scientific classification
- Kingdom: Animalia
- Phylum: Chordata
- Class: Aves
- Order: Cuculiformes
- Family: Cuculidae
- Genus: Centropus
- Species: C. chlororhynchos

Binomial name
- Centropus chlororhynchos Blyth, 1849
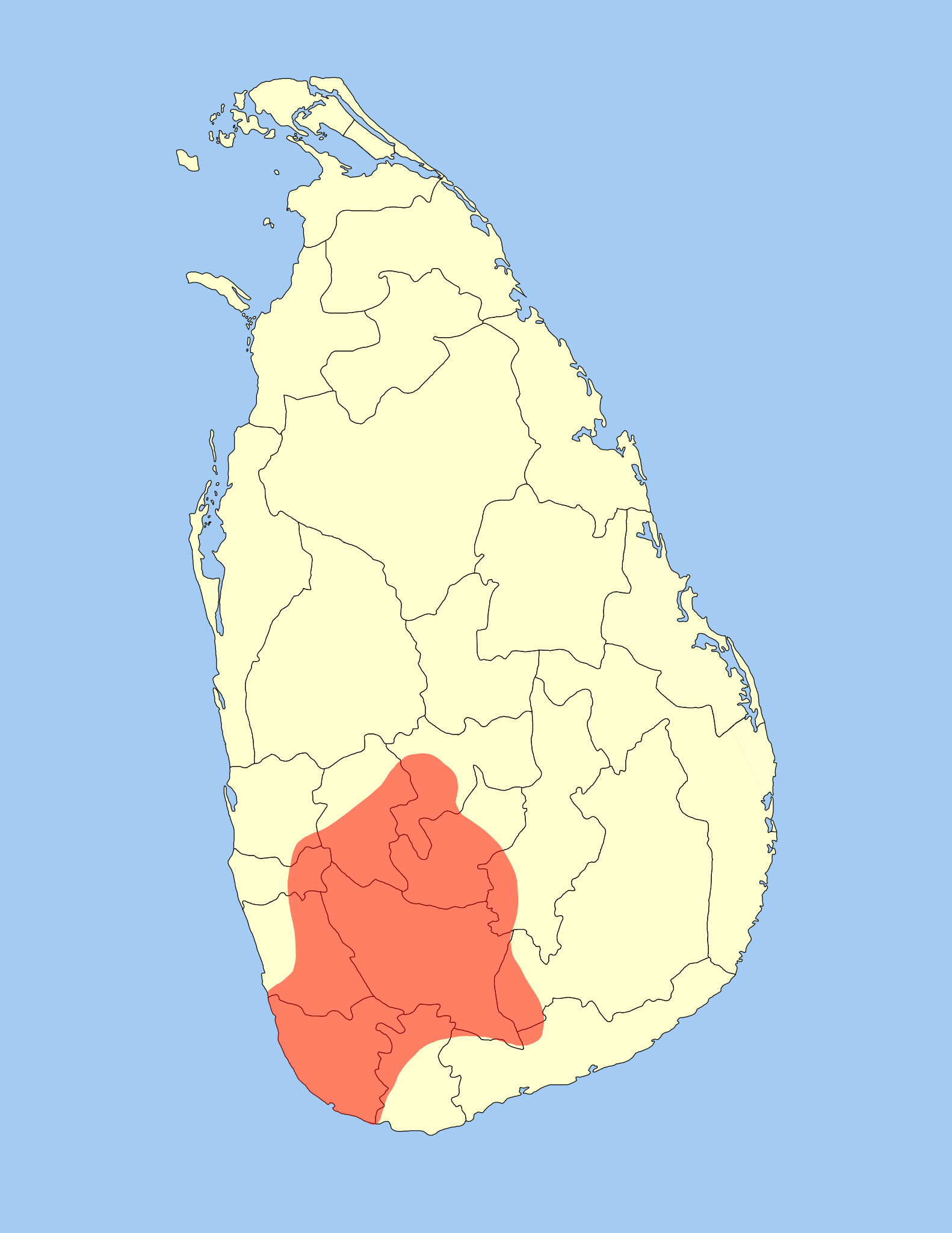

Synonyms
- Centropus chlororhynchus

= Green-billed coucal =

Species of bird

The green-billed coucal (Centropus chlororhynchos) is a member of the cuckoos. It is endemic to Sri Lanka's wet zone and listed as Vulnerable on the IUCN Red List, as the small population declined due to forest destruction and fragmentation. It inhabits the tall rainforests of southwest Sri Lanka and nests in bushes. Its typical clutch is 2–3 eggs.

== Description ==
It is a medium to large bird at 43 cm. Its head and body is purple-black, the wings are maroon above and black below, and the long tail is dark green. The bill is a distinctive light green. Sexes are similar, but juveniles are duller and streaked. It is somewhat smaller and less contrasted than the more widespread greater coucal. Despite its size and distinctive call, this is a difficult species to see because of the dense habitat in which it lives and its retiring nature. It feeds on a wide range of insects, caterpillars and small vertebrates, but snails are a favourite.

== In culture ==
In Sri Lanka, this bird is known as bata atti-kukula – or, wal atti-kukula in the Sinhala language. This bird appears in a 20 rupee Sri Lankan postal stamp.
