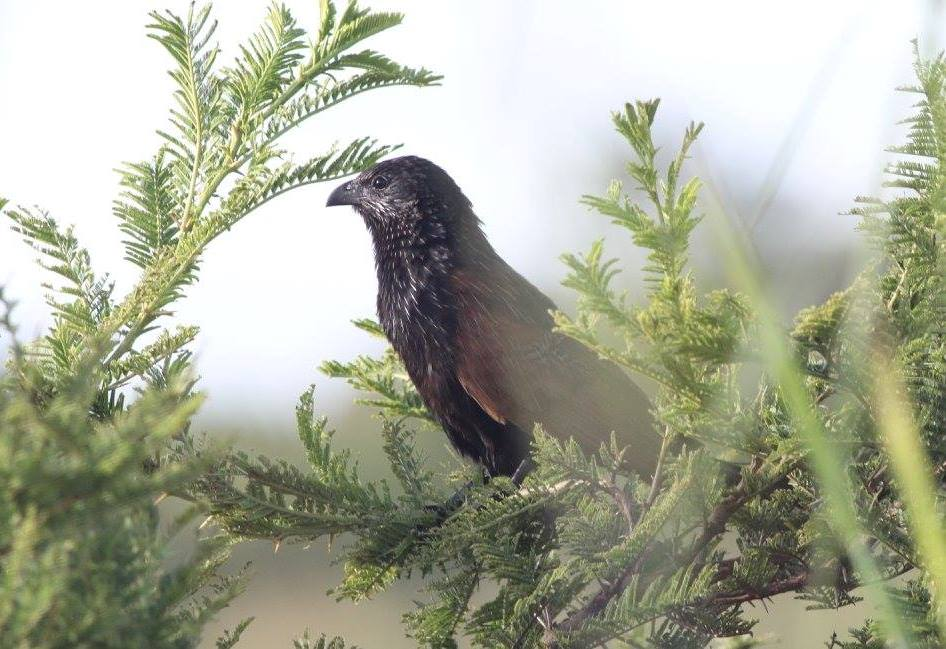
- Subadult in central Angola

Conservation status
- Least Concern (IUCN 3.1)

Scientific classification
- Kingdom: Animalia
- Phylum: Chordata
- Class: Aves
- Order: Cuculiformes
- Family: Cuculidae
- Genus: Centropus
- Species: C. grillii

Binomial name
- Centropus grillii Hartlaub, 1861

= Black coucal =

Species of bird

The black coucal (Centropus grillii) is a species of cuckoo in the family Cuculidae. It has a wide distribution in Africa south of the Sahara.

== Description ==
The male black coucal is 30 cm (12 in) in length while the female is 34 cm (13 in), otherwise they are similar in appearance. In breeding plumage the head, body and tail are black, apart from some buff barring on the rump, and the wings are rufous. Outside the breeding season, the upper parts are dark brown with rufous barring. The eyes are brown and the beak and legs are black. Juveniles are rufous with various dark and light barring and streaking.

== Distribution and habitat ==
It is found in Angola, Benin, Botswana, Burkina Faso, Burundi, Cameroon, Central African Republic, Chad, Republic of the Congo, DRC, Ivory Coast, Eswatini, Ethiopia, Gabon, Gambia, Ghana, Guinea, Guinea-Bissau, Kenya, Liberia, Malawi, Mali, Mozambique, Namibia, Niger, Nigeria, Rwanda, Senegal, Sierra Leone, South Africa, Sudan, Tanzania, Togo, Uganda, Zambia, and Zimbabwe. It is resident in some locations and migrant in others. Its habitat is marshes, savannah, grassland, bracken, undergrowth, and clearings in woodland, and occasionally reeds and papyrus. It usually occurs below 1,500 m (5,000 ft) but occasionally up to 2,000 m (6,600 ft).

== Ecology ==
The species has the role of sexes reversed with the males tending the nest while females are polyandrous and maintain territories. Studies on the hormonal system show that progesterone is responsible for controlling the aggressiveness of females.

== Status ==
The black coucal is a generally uncommon bird with a very wide range. No particular threats have been identified and the population is believed to be steady, so the International Union for Conservation of Nature has rated its conservation status as being of "least concern".
