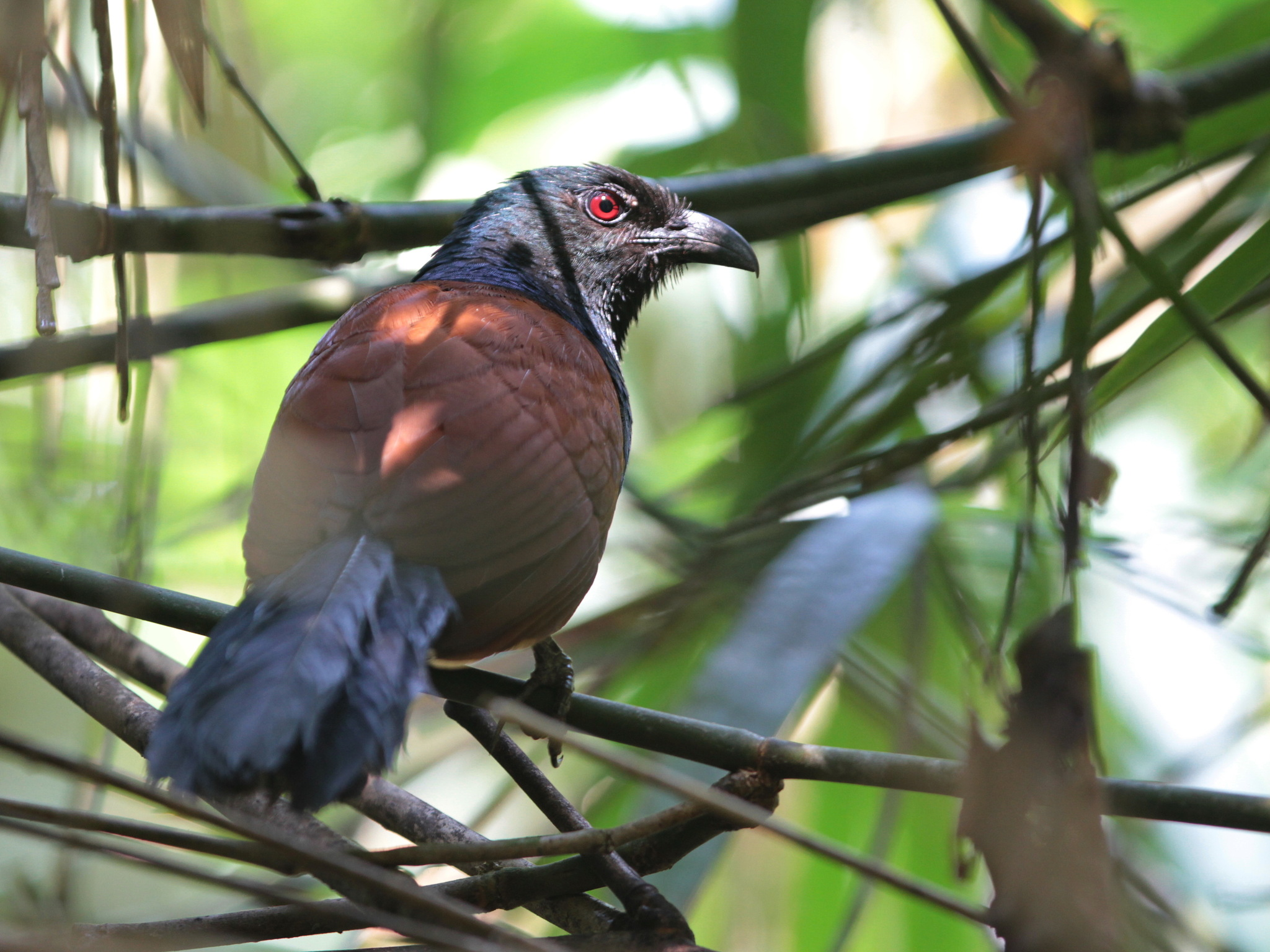

Conservation status
- Vulnerable (IUCN 3.1)

Scientific classification
- Kingdom: Animalia
- Phylum: Chordata
- Class: Aves
- Order: Cuculiformes
- Family: Cuculidae
- Genus: Centropus
- Species: C. rectunguis

Binomial name
- Centropus rectunguis Strickland, 1847

= Short-toed coucal =

Species of bird

The short-toed coucal (Centropus rectunguis) is a species of cuckoo in the family Cuculidae. It is found in Brunei, Indonesia, Malaysia, and Thailand. Its natural habitats are subtropical or tropical moist lowland forest and subtropical or tropical moist shrubland. It is threatened by habitat loss.
