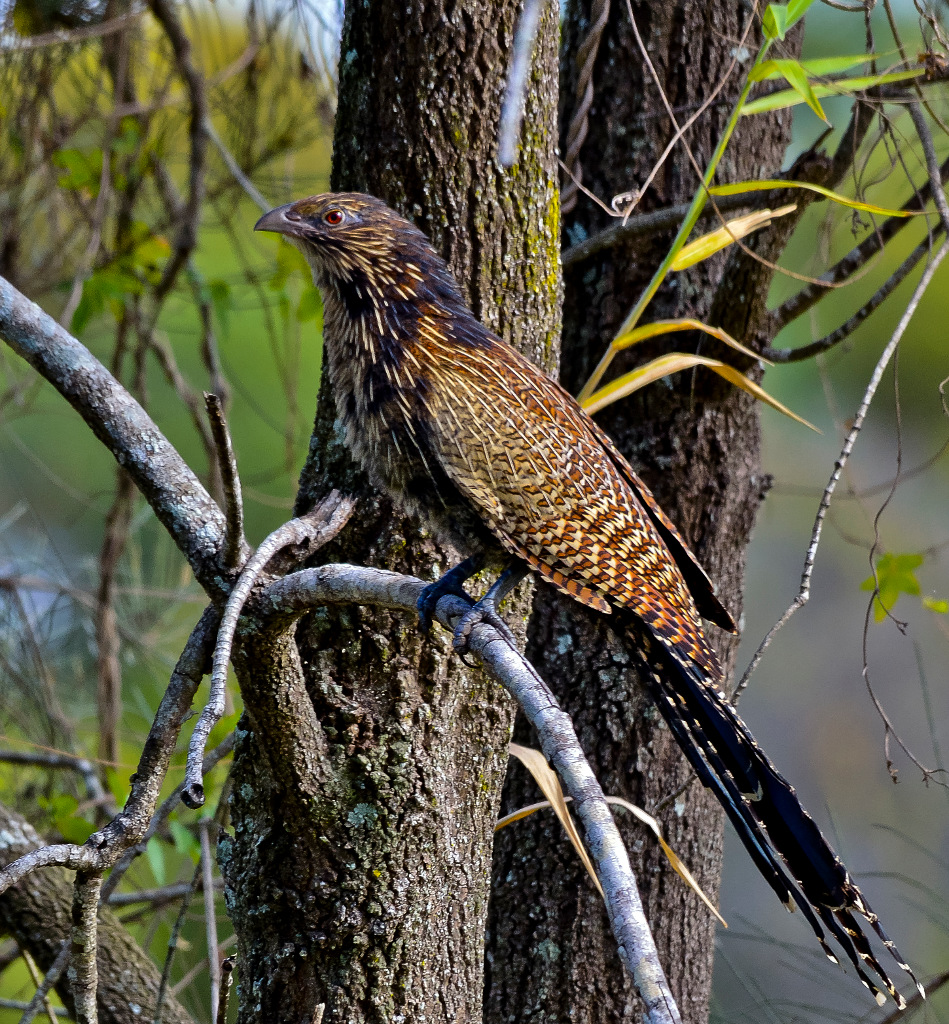
- In Queensland, Australia

Conservation status
- Least Concern (IUCN 3.1)

Scientific classification
- Kingdom: Animalia
- Phylum: Chordata
- Class: Aves
- Order: Cuculiformes
- Family: Cuculidae
- Genus: Centropus
- Species: C. phasianinus

Binomial name
- Centropus phasianinus (Latham, 1801)

Synonyms
- Cuculus phasianinus Latham; Polophilus variegatus Leach; Polophilus gigas Stephens; Corydonyx giganteus Vieillot; Centropus speciosus Brookes

= Pheasant coucal =

Species of bird

The pheasant coucal (Centropus phasianinus) is a species of cuckoo in the family Cuculidae. It is found in Australia, Timor and New Guinea. Its natural habitats are subtropical or tropical moist lowland forests and subtropical or tropical mangrove forests. It has adapted well to canefields in northern Australia. The pheasant coucal is unusual among Australian cuckoos in that it incubates and raises its own young instead of laying its eggs in the nest of another species.

== Taxonomy ==
The ornithologist John Latham described the pheasant coucal as Cuculus phasianinus in 1801, based on a drawing by Thomas Watling. Six subspecies are recognised, two of which are found in Australia with an abrupt demarcation between them occurring around the Burdekin River in Central Queensland. South is the nominate subspecies phasianinus, while north is the subspecies melanurus, which is larger in size and has darker and more prominent black bands on its rectrices. The little known subspecies mui is found in eastern Timor, and has distinctive white plumage of its upperparts, head and breast. The remaining three subspecies are found in New Guinea, and all have darker plumage than other forms. Subspecies thierfelderi is found in the Trans-fly region in the south of the island and is intermediate between melanurus and nigricans. Subspecies nigricans occurs in the eastern coastal regions of New Guinea and the D'Entrecasteaux Islands. Propinquus is a smaller subspecies from northern New Guinea.

The Kai coucal (C. spilopterus) of the Kai Islands in Indonesia was formerly considered conspecific, but was split as a distinct species by the IOC in 2021.

== Description ==
50 to 70 cm (20 to 28 in) in length, the pheasant coucal is a large heavy-set bird adapted for living on the ground, reminiscent of a pheasant in shape. Birds in breeding plumage have black heads, necks, breasts and bellies, barred chestnut wings and long black, brown and cream barred tails. Outside the breeding season, their black head and underparts moult to a white-streaked chestnut colour.

The pheasant coucal's summer voice is a low descending 'boop boop boop'. Its winter voice is a sharp hissing.

== Distribution and habitat ==
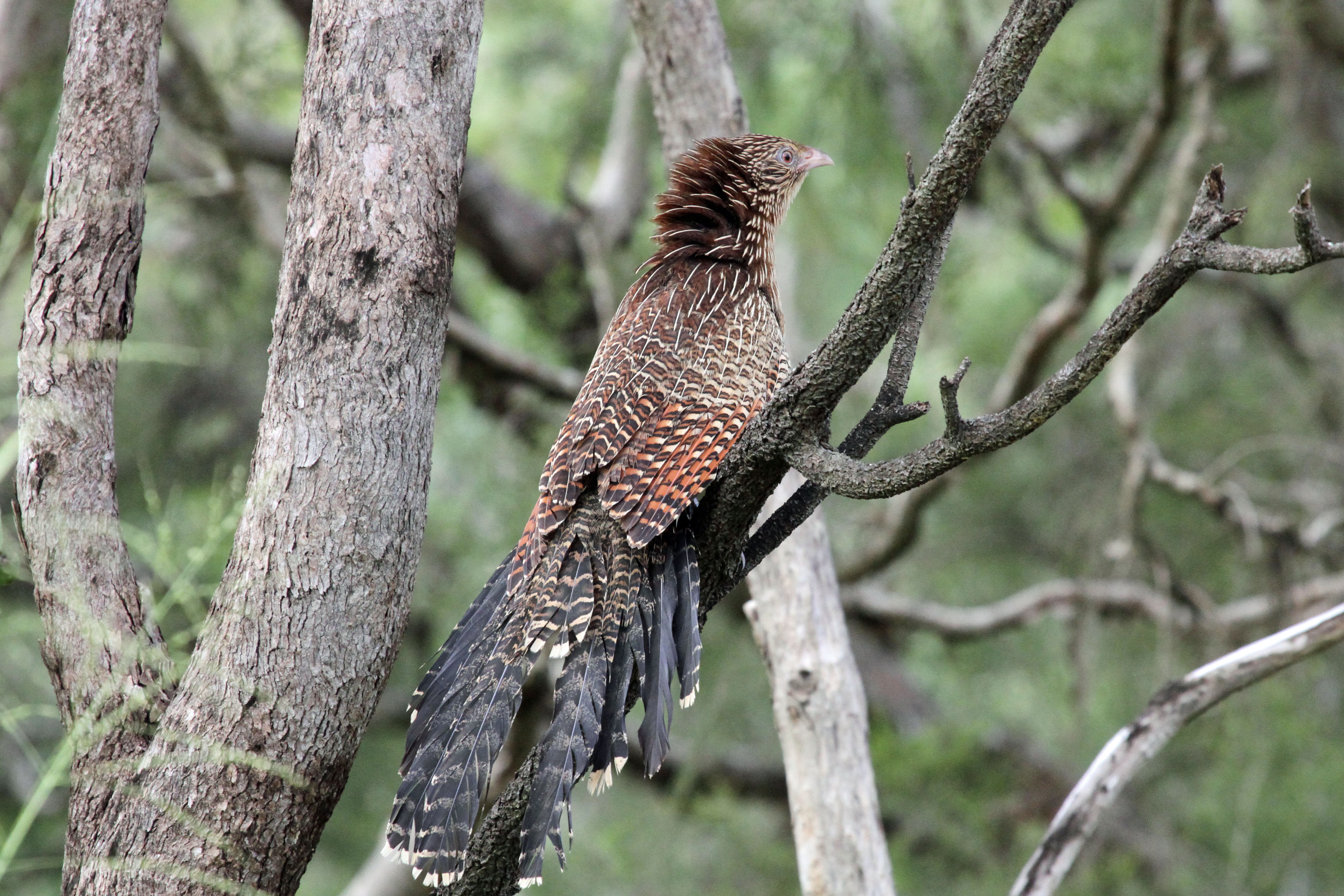
In Cape York, Queensland

It is found in eastern and northern Australia, from the New South Wales south coast north to Cape York, and across the top of Australia to the Pilbara, as well as eastern Timor and lowland New Guinea. The preferred habitat has dense understory as a component, typically shrubby understory in forest, or tall grasses in grassland or swampy areas, as well as sugar cane in cane plantations and patches of weedy vegetation such as blackberry or lantana.

== Feeding ==
Predominantly carnivorous, the pheasant coucal eats small reptiles and amphibians, bird eggs and young, small mammals and large insects.

They are opportunistic predators, and have been known to attack birds caught in mist nets.

== Breeding ==
The nest is an untidy bowl-shaped structure made of grasses and leaves. It is located in tall grass or bushes, and the stems overhead are often tied together to make a canopy. Two to six white oval eggs measuring 38 by 29 mm are laid. The incubation period is 15 days, with young remaining in the nest for another 13 days. The male pheasant coucal does most of the incubating of eggs and feeding of young, as well as building the nest.
