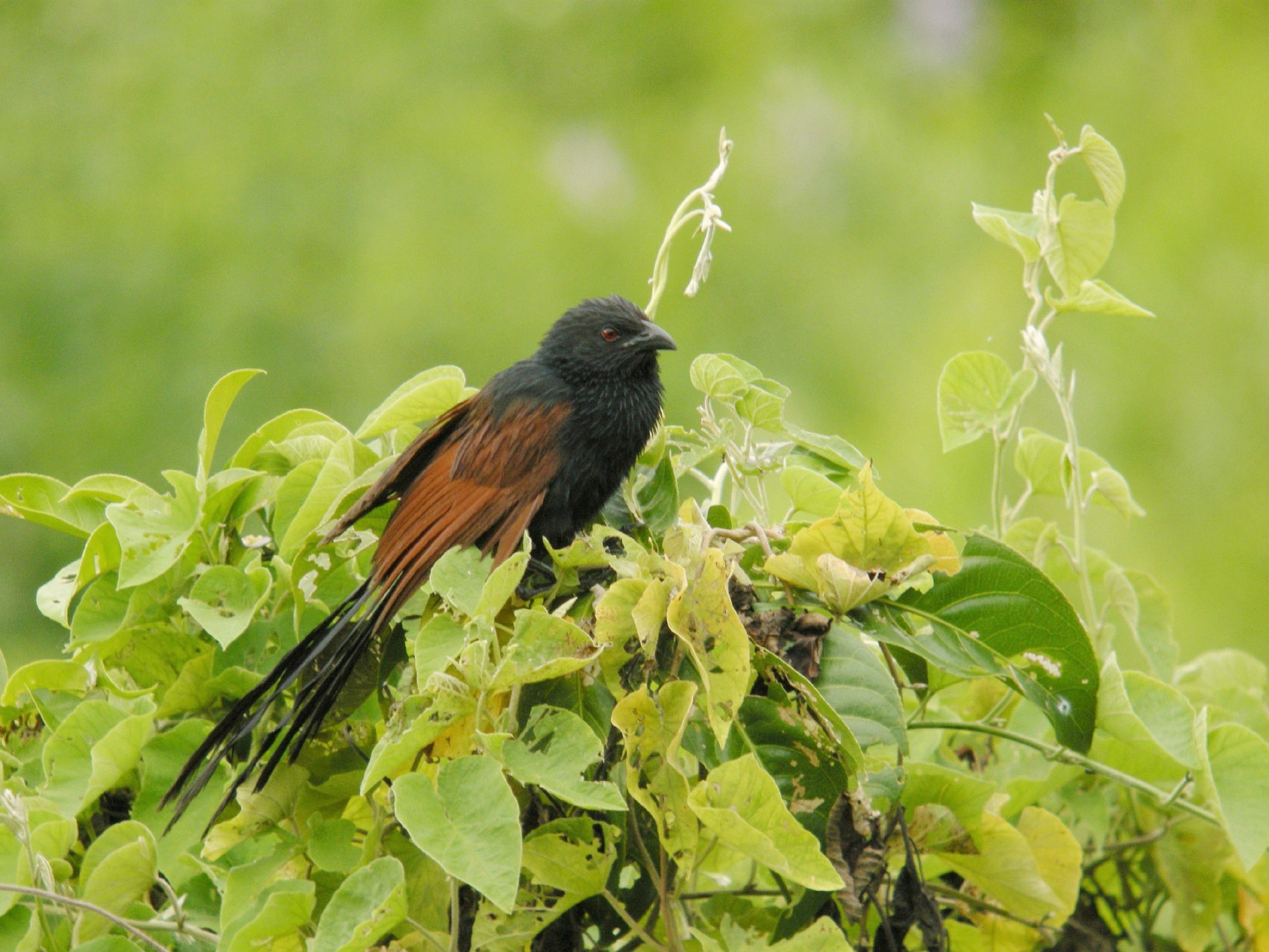
- At Ankarafantsika, Madagascar

Conservation status
- Least Concern (IUCN 3.1)

Scientific classification
- Kingdom: Animalia
- Phylum: Chordata
- Class: Aves
- Order: Cuculiformes
- Family: Cuculidae
- Genus: Centropus
- Species: C. toulou

Binomial name
- Centropus toulou (Müller, 1776)

= Malagasy coucal =

Species of bird

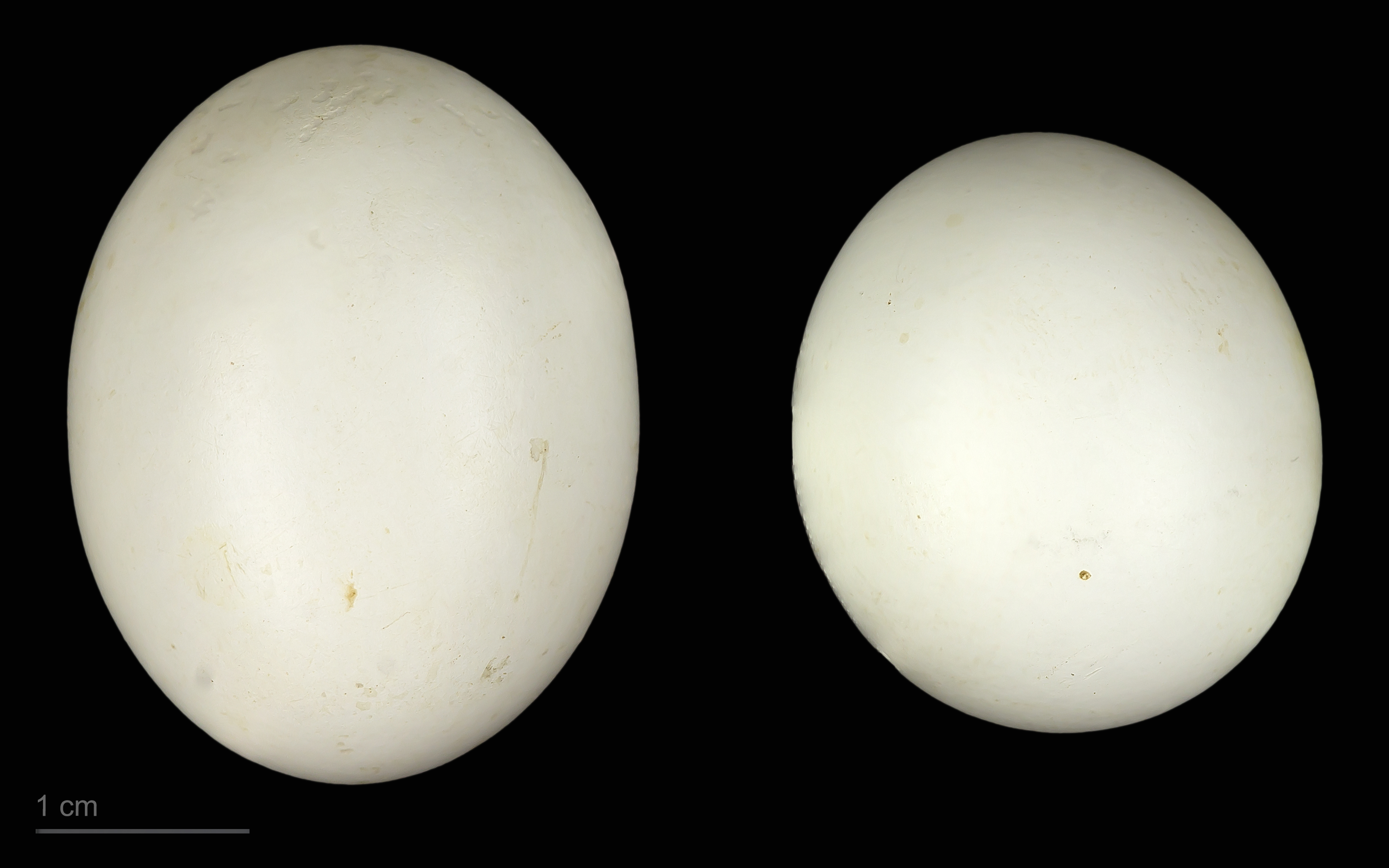
Centropus toulou - MHNT

The Malagasy coucal or Madagascar coucal (Centropus toulou) is a species of cuckoo in the family Cuculidae. It is found in Madagascar and in the Seychelles, where it occurs on Aldabra and was formerly present on Assumption Island and Cosmoledo. Its natural habitats are dense vegetation in subtropical or tropical moist lowland forests, mangrove forests, rough grassland, marshes and reedbeds.

== Description ==
The Malagasy coucal is a medium-sized bird with the adult length being in the range 40 to 50 cm (16 to 20 in). The male is smaller than the female, weighing about 140 g (5 oz) to the female's 190 g (7 oz), but otherwise the sexes are similar in appearance. In breeding plumage the bird is black, glossed with green, except for the tips of its wings which are brown and its mid and lower back which are reddish brown. In non-breeding plumage the head, neck and throat are brown streaked with cream, the wings reddish brown, the uppertail coverts black with some pale barring, the tail blackish brown with faint barring and the belly blackish brown. The iris is red, the bill black in breeding plumage and pale in non-breeding plumage, and the feet are grey to black. The call is a descending series of notes that sound like water pouring out of a bottle, and is often sung as a duet with the bird's mate.

== Distribution and habitat ==
The Malagasy coucal is resident in Madagascar and in Aldabra in the Seychelles, to which it may have spread via the Comoros, although it has not been present in the latter in historic times. It is found in a range of habitats including among undergrowth in both primary and secondary forests, woodland edges, clearings, palm groves, reedbeds, marshes, mangroves, rough grassland, paddifields and gardens at altitudes of up to 1,800 metres (5,900 ft).

There are two subspecies,

- Centropus toulou toulou: Madagascar
- Centropus toulou insularis: Aldabra

== Behaviour ==
The Malagasy coucal inhabits thick, bushy places. It is a predator and feeds in the undergrowth and on the ground by pursuing and pouncing on its prey. Its diet includes large insects, spiders, molluscs and other invertebrates, geckos, skinks, chameleons and rodents, all of which it swallows whole. It pries off loose bark on trees to search for lizards or other prey hiding underneath. It has been recorded raiding bird nests and devouring the eggs and nestlings.

Breeding takes place between September and March and the male undertakes much of the nesting activity. The nest is a large, dome-shaped structure with an entrance at one end, hidden in dense vegetation within a few metres of the ground. It is composed of grasses, leaves, stems and tendrils and the female may start laying before it is completed. A clutch of two to three (occasionally four or five) smooth white eggs is laid at intervals of several days. Each egg hatches after about fifteen days of incubation, which is performed mostly by the male. The chicks grow rapidly and fledge about nineteen days later.

== Status ==
The Malagasy coucal has a wide range and is quite common in Madagascar and the island of Aldabra. It is believed to be extirpated on Assumption Island in the Seychelles, where it has not been recorded since 1906. In the other parts of its range the population seems stable and, although the exact number of these birds is not known, it is likely that there are more than 10,000 mature individuals; the IUCN thus lists the bird as being of "least concern".
