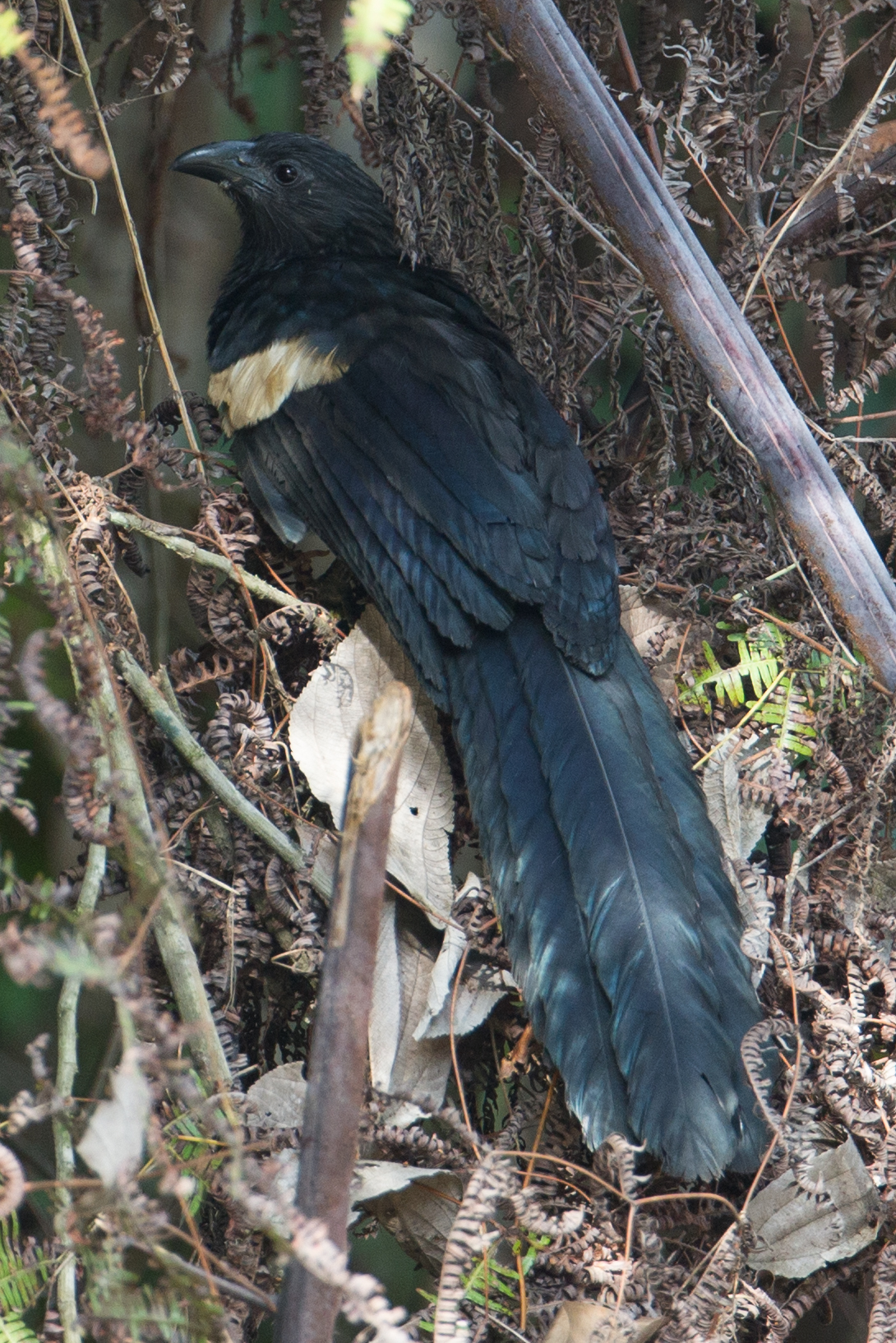

Conservation status
- Least Concern (IUCN 3.1)

Scientific classification
- Kingdom: Animalia
- Phylum: Chordata
- Class: Aves
- Order: Cuculiformes
- Family: Cuculidae
- Genus: Centropus
- Species: C. goliath

Binomial name
- Centropus goliath Bonaparte, 1850

= Goliath coucal =

Species of bird

The goliath coucal (Centropus goliath) is a species of cuckoo in the family Cuculidae. It is found in the northern Maluku Islands.
