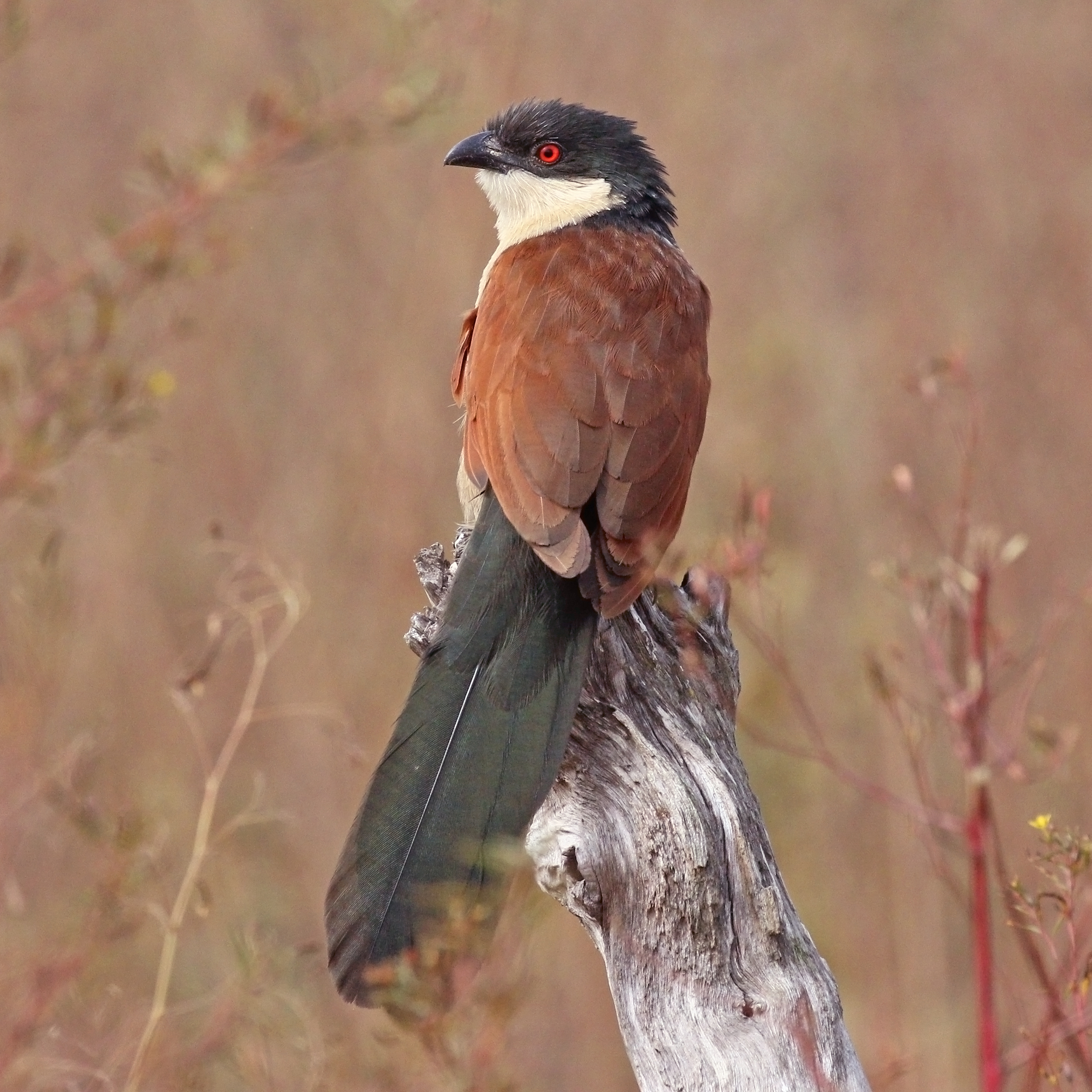
- C. s. senegalensis, Gambia

Conservation status
- Least Concern (IUCN 3.1)

Scientific classification
- Kingdom: Animalia
- Phylum: Chordata
- Class: Aves
- Order: Cuculiformes
- Family: Cuculidae
- Genus: Centropus
- Species: C. senegalensis

Binomial name
- Centropus senegalensis (Linnaeus, 1766)

Synonyms
- Cuculus senegalensis (protonym)

= Senegal coucal =

Species of bird

C. s. aegyptius, Egypt

The Senegal coucal (Centropus senegalensis) is a member of the cuckoo order of birds, the Cuculiformes, which also includes the roadrunners and the anis. It is a medium-sized member of its genus and is found in lightly-wooded country and savannah in central and southern Africa.

== Taxonomy ==
In 1760, the French zoologist Mathurin Jacques Brisson included a description and an illustration of the Senegal coucal in the fourth volume of his Ornithologie based on a specimen collected in Senegal. He used the French name Le coucou de Sénégal and the Latin name Cuculus Senegalensis. Although Brisson coined Latin names, these do not conform to the binomial system and are not recognised by the International Commission on Zoological Nomenclature. When in 1766, the Swedish naturalist Carl Linnaeus updated his Systema Naturae for the twelfth edition he added 240 species that had been previously described by Brisson in his Ornithologie. One of these was the Senegal coucal. Linnaeus included a terse description, coined the binomial name Cuculus senegalensis and cited Brisson's work. The Senegal coucal is now one of around 30 species placed in the genus Centropus that was introduced in 1811 by the German zoologist Johann Karl Wilhelm Illiger. The genus name combines the Ancient Greek kentron meaning "spur" or "spike" with pous meaning "foot".

Three subspecies are recognised:

- C. s. aegyptius (Gmelin, JF, 1788) – lower Nile valley
- C. s. senegalensis (Linnaeus, 1766) – Senegal and Gambia to Eritrea south to northwest Angola, south-central DR Congo and Uganda
- C. s. flecki Reichenow, 1893 – east Angola to northeast Namibia and southwest Tanzania south to Malawi and Zimbabwe

== Description ==
This is a medium-sized species at 39 cm (15 in) in length. Its crown, nape and upper parts, bill, legs and long tail are black, the eyes are red, the wings are chestnut, and the underparts are creamy white, with blackish barring on the flanks. The sexes are similar, but juveniles are browner and more heavily barred above, with buff to cinnamon, barred and streaked underparts.

== Distribution and habitat ==
It is a widespread species distributed through much of central and southern Africa south of the Sahara Desert. The range extends from Senegal in the west to Ethiopia and Kenya in the east, and Angola and Congo to the south. A separate population in southern Africa is centred on Zambia, Zimbabwe and northern Botswana. The Senegal coucal is a bird of grassy habitats with trees, such as bushes and savannah.

== Behaviour and ecology ==
The Senegal coucal takes a wide range of insects, caterpillars and small vertebrates. It occasionally eats other food items. It nests off the ground in low vegetation, and the typical clutch is two to four eggs laid in a large nest built from stalks and leaves.

== Status ==
This is an abundant species, which advertises its presence with a loud ook-ook-ook call. It has a very wide range and no particular threats have been identified so the International Union for Conservation of Nature has assessed its conservation status as being of "least concern".
