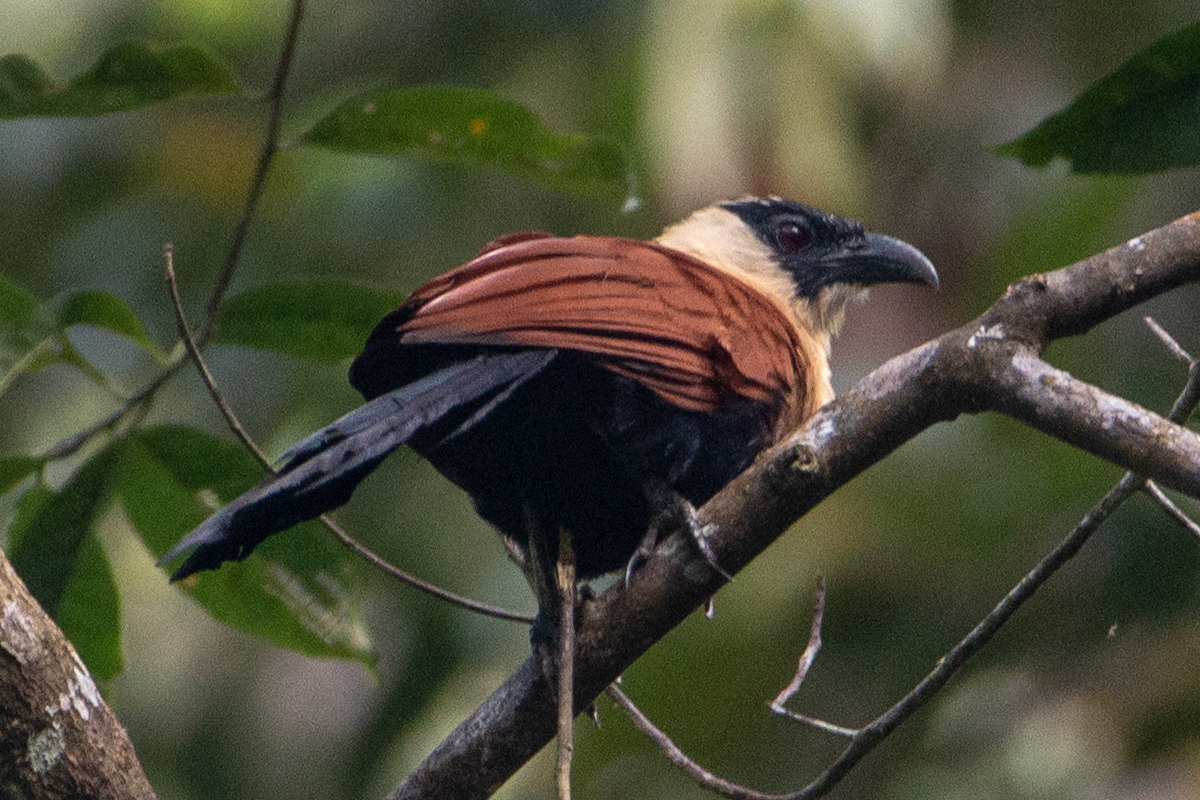

Conservation status
- Least Concern (IUCN 3.1)

Scientific classification
- Kingdom: Animalia
- Phylum: Chordata
- Class: Aves
- Order: Cuculiformes
- Family: Cuculidae
- Genus: Centropus
- Species: C. melanops

Binomial name
- Centropus melanops Lesson, 1830

= Black-faced coucal =

Species of bird

The black-faced coucal (Centropus melanops) is a species of cuckoo in the family Cuculidae. It is endemic to the Philippines found in the islands of Mindanao, Basilan Dinagat Islands Bohol, Leyte, Biliran and Samar. It is a striking coucal with its cream head contrasted with a black mask and tail and chestnut wings. Its natural habitat is tropical moist lowland forest.

== Description and taxonomy ==
=== Subspecies ===
Two subspecies are recognized:

- C. m mindanensis – Found on Mindanao, Basilan and Dinagat Islands
- C. m. banken – Found on Bohol, Leyte, Biliran and Samar

Subspecies are weakly differentiated and may possibly lumped to be monotypic.

== Ecology and behavior ==
Not much is known about its diet and breeding habits. It is pressumed to feed on insects. Forages in thick tangled vines and bamboo. Nest is undescribed but eggs are supposedly all white.

== Habitat and conservation status ==
It is found in tropical moist lowland forest with dense understory up to 1,200 meters above sea level. Forages in tangled undergrowth and treetops.

IUCN has assessed this bird as least-concern species but the population is decreasing. This species' main threat is habitat loss with wholesale clearance of forest habitats as a result of logging, agricultural conversion and mining activities occurring within the range.

Occurs in a few protected areas like Pasonanca Natural Park, Mount Apo and Mount Kitanglad on Mindanao, Rajah Sikatuna Protected Landscape in Bohol and Samar Island Natural Park but actual protection and enforcement from illegal logging and hunting are lax
