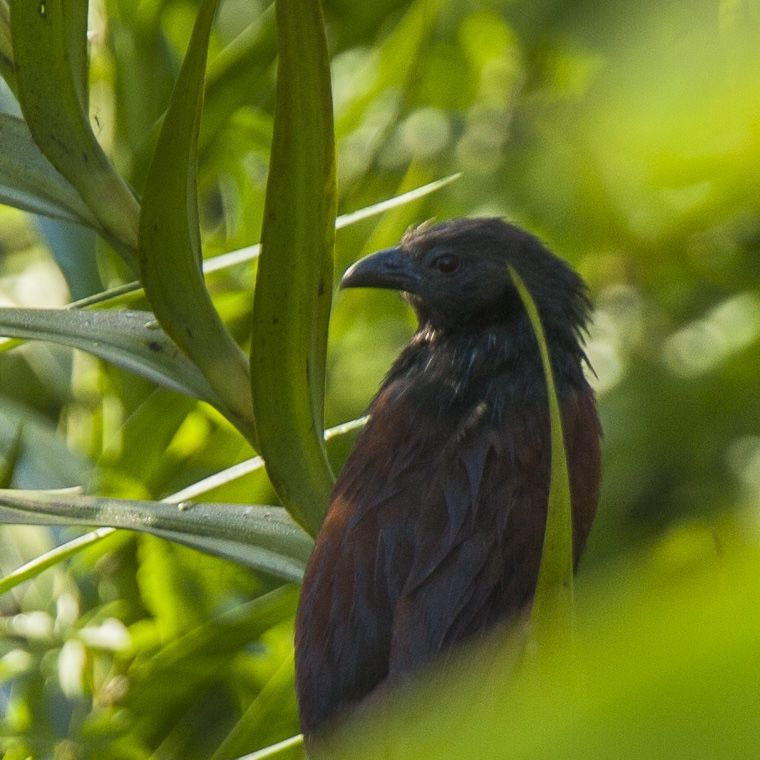

Conservation status
- Least Concern (IUCN 3.1)

Scientific classification
- Kingdom: Animalia
- Phylum: Chordata
- Class: Aves
- Order: Cuculiformes
- Family: Cuculidae
- Genus: Centropus
- Species: C. viridis

Binomial name
- Centropus viridis (Scopoli, 1786)

= Philippine coucal =

Species of bird

The Philippine coucal (Centropus viridis) is a species of cuckoo in the family Cuculidae. It is endemic to the Philippines. It is an insectivore.

== Description and taxonomy ==
=== Subspecies ===
Four subspecies are recognized:

- C. v. viridis — Found on Luzon, Polillo, Catanduanes, Marinduque, Masbate, Panay, Negros, Cebu, Bohol, Samar, Leyte, Mindanao and Basilan
- C. v. mindorensis — Found on Mindoro, Semirara, Caluya and Sibay
- C. v. carpenteri — Found on Batan Islands
- C. v. major — Found on Babuyan

Medium, sexes similar; races differ in color carpenteri and mindorensis are all black while viridis and majer are black with chestnut wings, and in size carpenteri and majer are larger than viridis and mindorensis. in viridis

== Behaviour and ecology ==
This species primarily feeds on insects however it also supplements its diet with small mammals, reptiles and amphibians. It is often seen feeding near the ground.

Breeds from April to July. Nest is a bulky globe of grass with a single entrance on the side placed 1 to 1.5 meters above the ground. Average clutch size consists of 3 dull white and chalky eggs. Chicks are described as dark-skinned.

== Habitat and conservation status ==
Its natural habitats are tall grassland, secondary forest and thickets up to 2,000 meters above sea level

The IUCN Red List has assessed this bird as least-concern species as it has a wide range is able to tolerate a wide range of habitat where it actually benefits from human altered habitat.
