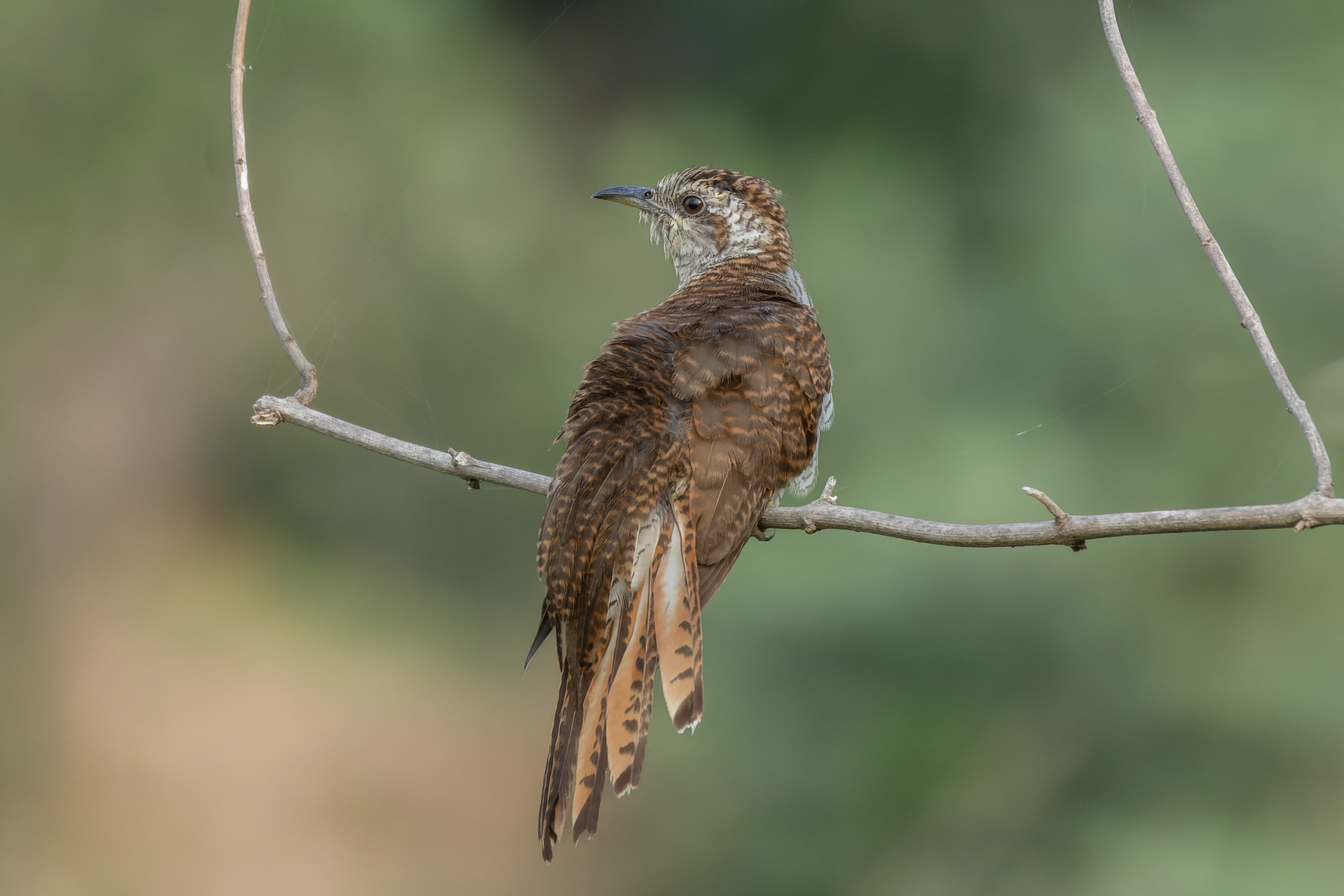
- In Ajodhya Hills, West Bengal, India. Calls

Conservation status
- Least Concern (IUCN 3.1)

Scientific classification
- Kingdom: Animalia
- Phylum: Chordata
- Class: Aves
- Order: Cuculiformes
- Family: Cuculidae
- Genus: Cacomantis
- Species: C. sonneratii

Binomial name
- Cacomantis sonneratii (Latham, 1790)
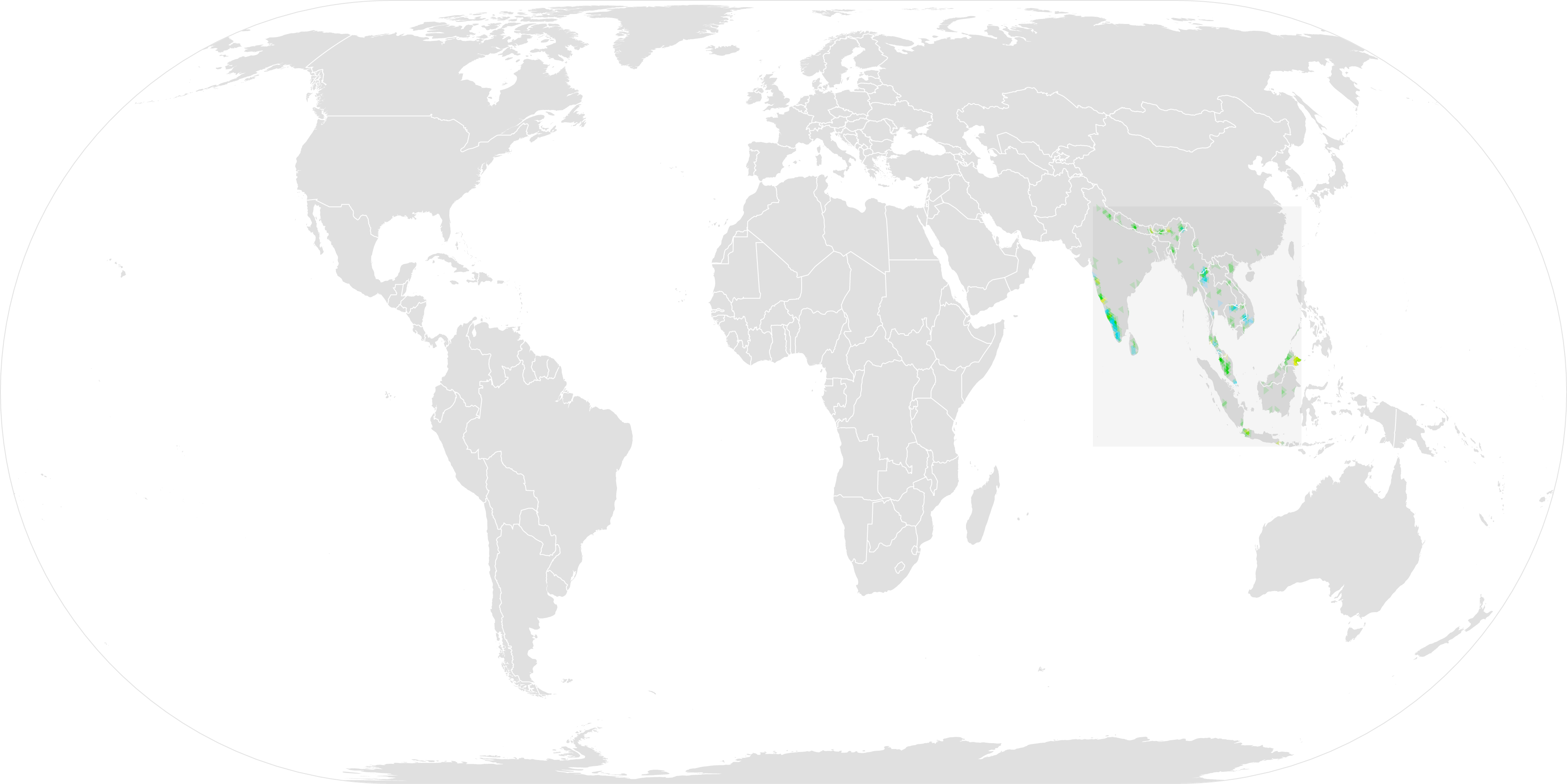
- Global range Year-Round Range Summer Range Winter Range

Synonyms
- Penthoceryx sonneratii

= Banded bay cuckoo =

Species of bird

The banded bay cuckoo or bay-banded cuckoo (Cacomantis sonneratii) is a species of small cuckoo found in the Indian subcontinent and Southeast Asia. Like others in the genus they have round nostrils. They are usually founded in well-wooded areas mainly in the lower hills. Males sing from exposed branches during the breeding season, which can vary with region. They are distinctive both in their calls as well as plumage with a white eyebrowed appearance and the rufous upperparts with regular dark bands and the whitish underside with fine striations.

== Description ==
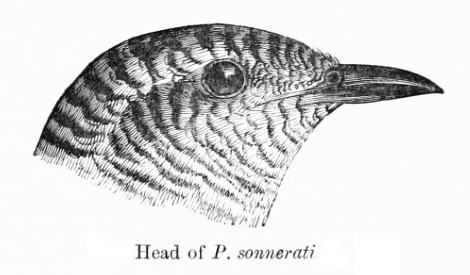
Head pattern

The adults are bright rufous or bay on the head and back and are broadly barred with dark brown. The bill is long and slightly curved. A whitish supercilium is distinctive above a dark eye-line. The wing is darker and tail is graduated with a dark brown centre. The tail has a subterminal black band and white tips to the feathers. The sexes are alike. The iris is yellow and the bill is black while the base of the lower mandible is greenish grey. The tarsi are grey. The juvenile is similar but has a pale lower mandible and white fringes to the feathers of the upper body.

The overall length is about 22 cm making it about the same size as the syntopic Cacomantis merulinus and Cacomantis variolosus. The hepatic forms of those can be similar but supercilium, long beak and barred tail distinguish this species.

== Taxonomy and systematics ==
The species was originally classed in the genus Cuculus by John Latham. The type specimen came from Northeastern India. The species epithet is after the French naturalist and explorer Pierre Sonnerat.

Four subspecies are generally recognized:

- the nominate form from India, Nepal, Thailand, Malay Peninsula
- C. s. musicus Ljungh, 1804 (from Java, Bali)
- C. s. fasciolatus Müller, 1843 (Sumatra)
- C. s. waiti Baker, 1919 (Sri Lanka)

Some sources also recognize malayanus (Chasen & Kloss, 1931) from Peninsular Malaysia and schlegeli (Junge, 1948) from Sumatra, Borneo and Palawan (SW Philippines).

== Ecology and behaviour ==
Like many other cuckoos, they are brood-parasitic and hosts recorded include the common iora, red-whiskered bulbul, white-bellied erpornis, scarlet minivet, bulbuls and small babblers (Stachyris spp.). The eggs resemble those of the hosts. The incubation and nesting are not well documented. Fledglings of the host are evicted.

Populations are often migratory or partially migratory. In India, they are found mainly during the monsoons.

They are found in well-wooded forests, mainly in hill areas. Insects are their primary diet. They capture insects by gleaning as well as by aerial sallying.

The breeding season varies widely from region to region. Near Bombay they are known to lay eggs from February to August, Assam from April to August while they seem to sing through much of the year in the Eastern Ghats. In Sri Lanka, young have been seen in June and October while adults sing from January to May in the Malay Peninsula.

The call of this species is distinctive. It is high-pitched four note whistle that has been transcribed as "wee-ti wee-tee" or "smoke-yer-pepper". The frequency starts at 2.4 kHz and each note falls in pitch with the strophe lasting a second.
