= Ochre-bellied kingfisher =

Scientific classification
- Kingdom: Animalia
- Phylum: Chordata
- Class: Aves
- Order: Coraciiformes
- Family: Alcedinidae
- Subfamily: Halcyoninae
- Genus: Syma
- Species: S. ochracea

Binomial name
- Syma ochracea Rothschild and Hartert, 1901

Synonyms
- Syma torotoro ochracea

Species of bird

The ochre-bellied kingfisher (Syma ochracea) is a species of bird in the family Alcedinidae. It is endemic to the D'Entrecasteaux Islands off Milne Bay in eastern Papua New Guinea. Until recently, it was considered conspecific with the yellow-billed kingfisher. It was described by Lionel Walter Rothschild and Ernst Hartert in 1901. It is monotypic.

== Taxonomy and systematics ==
Until 2025, this species was considered conspecific with the yellow-billed kingfisher, but it was separated from it based on differences in morphology, plumage, vocalizations and genetics.

This species was described by Rothschild and Hartert as Syma torotoro ochracea from a specimen collected on 9 December 1896 by Albert Stewart Meek from Goodenough Island. There are 15 paratypes, six males and six females collected from Fergusson Island, and two females and one male collected from Goodenough.

== Description ==
This species is a distinctive small kingfisher, with a rufous head, greenish back and tail, and a black patch on the nape. The bill, legs and feet are yellow, and the iris is brown. The female is similar to the male but it has a black crown.

The similar mountain kingfisher is separated by the presence of a small black line on the top of the bill, which is absent in ochracea. The mountain kingfisher also has paler underparts. The formerly conspecfiic yellow-billed kingfisher is slightly smaller with paler underparts, and has whitish coloration on the chin, throat, belly and underparts, whereas ochracea has only a whitish chin.

== Vocalizations ==
This species is vocally divergent from the other Syma species and makes two different types of calls- the "long song" and the "short song".

The "short song" is a loud descending song of 5-8 notes and is a much shorter version of the "long song". It lasts about 1.1-1.5 seconds, and the first note has the longest duration, about 0.25s. It is the most common vocalization, and is repeated multiple times with intervals.

The "long song" is a loud accelerating song which gradually decreases in pitch and consists of 19-30 notes. It lasts for 4.4-5.4 seconds, and the first note lasts for about 0.28 seconds. It is uttered one or two times at irregular intervals.

== Distribution and habitat ==
This species is known from three islands in the D'Entrecasteaux Islands- Goodenough Island, Fergusson Island and Normanby Island. It is common in lowland forests at an elevation of up to 1000 m in Fergusson Island, but has been recorded at elevations of 1800 m.
