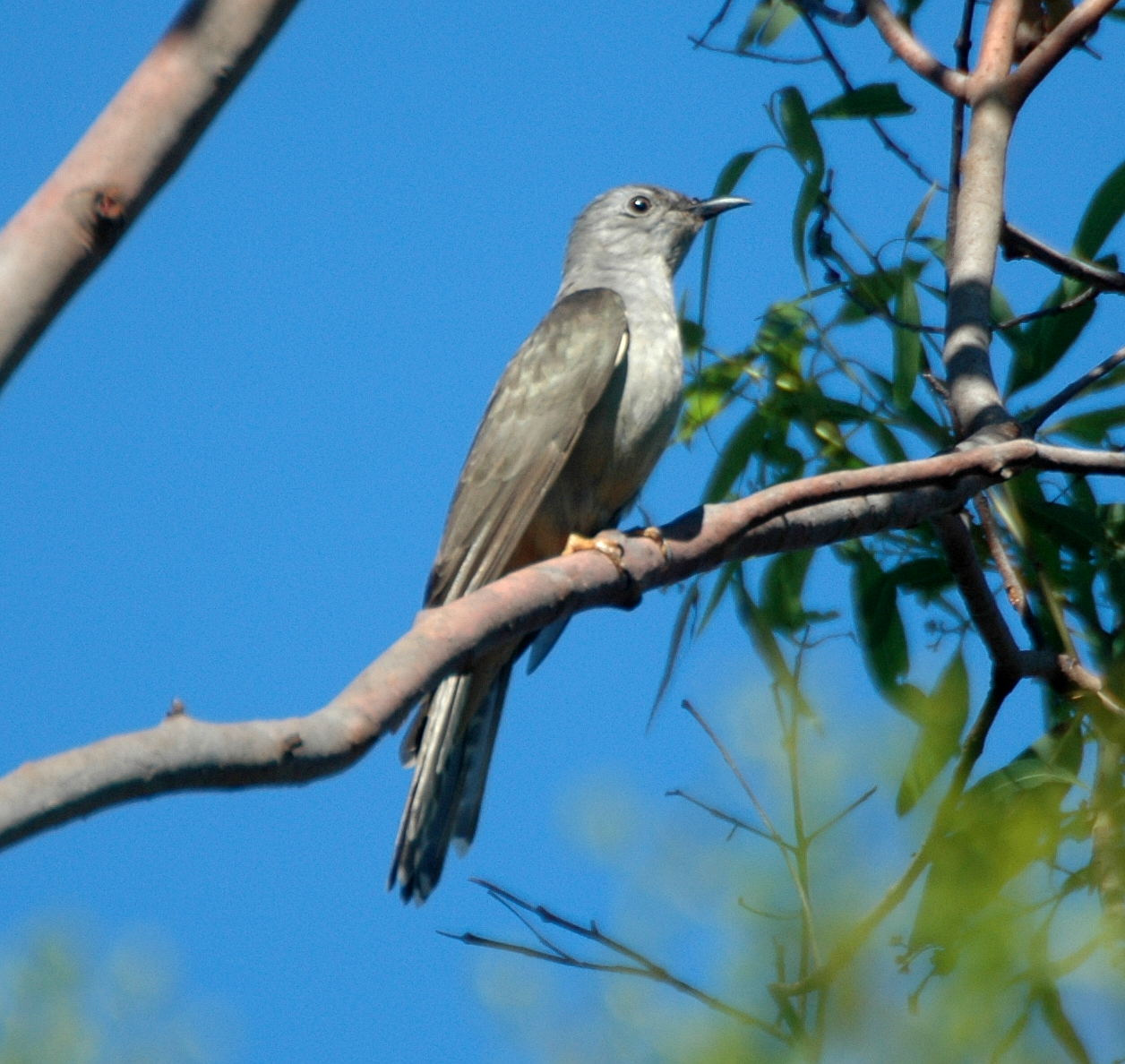

Conservation status
- Least Concern (IUCN 3.1)

Scientific classification
- Kingdom: Animalia
- Phylum: Chordata
- Class: Aves
- Order: Cuculiformes
- Family: Cuculidae
- Genus: Cacomantis
- Species: C. variolosus

Binomial name
- Cacomantis variolosus (Vigors & Horsfield, 1827)

= Sahul brush cuckoo =

Species of bird

The Sahul brush cuckoo (Cacomantis variolosus), formerly known as the brush cuckoo, is a member of the cuckoo family. It is native to Malesia, New Guinea, the Solomon Islands and northern and eastern Australia. It is a grey-brown bird with a buff breast. Its call is a familiar sound of the Australian and Indonesian bush.

== Taxonomy ==
Eight subspecies are recognised:

- C. v. major Salvadori, 1880 – north Moluccas (Morotai to Obi Islands)
- C. v. tymbonomus (Müller, S, 1843) – Rote Island, Timor and Wetar (east Lesser Sunda Islands)
- C. v. infaustus Cabanis & Heine, 1863 – New Guinea and most satellite islands
- C. v. obscuratus Stresemann & Paludan, 1932 – Numfor (Geelvink Bay islands, northwest New Guinea)
- C. v. variolosus (Vigors & Horsfield, 1827) – northeast Western Australia to south Victoria (north, east Australia)
- C. v. macrocercus Stresemann, 1921 – New Ireland, New Britain and satellites (east Bismarck Archipelago)
- C. v. websteri Hartert, EJO, 1898 – New Hanover Island (central north Bismarck Archipelago)
- C. v. fortior Rothschild & Hartert, EJO, 1914 – D'Entrecasteaux Archipelago (east of southeast New Guinea)

The Manus brush cuckoo (Cacomantis blandus) and the Solomons brush cuckoo (Cacomantis addendus) were formerly treated as subspecies.

Most are geographically isolated, though some come into contact outside of the breeding season. For example, on Seram, members of the nominate subspecies variolosus join the local aeruginosus during the southern hemisphere winter.

The convention of uniting the subspecies under C. variolosus dates back at least to Peters' checklist, but there is uncertainty about whether they all belong there or not. For example, some ornithologists treat sepulcralis as a species in its own right (the Rusty-breasted cuckoo). Likewise, aeruginosus is elevated by some to species level (the Moluccan cuckoo), but is placed by others under C. sepulcralis. Some ornithologists treat infaustus as part of C. variolosus and others as part of C. sepulcralis. The uncertainty arises because differences between the subspecies in characteristics such as plumage colour can be minimal, while differences in vocalisations are often significant.

== Description ==
The Sahul brush cuckoo is about 22–26 cm (8.7–10.2 in) long. The plumage of adult males and females is similar. The head is pale grey, the breast is buff, the back is grey-brown, and the underside of the tail is brown with white tips and bars. The eye has a narrow, pale ring around it, and the feet are olive-pink. Juvenile plumage is heavily barred dark brown. The wings are sharply pointed and backswept in flight. Underwings are grey-brown with pale buff underwing coverts and a white or pale buff bar. The Sahul brush cuckoo has a similar appearance to the pallid cuckoo, and especially the fan-tailed and chestnut-breasted cuckoo.

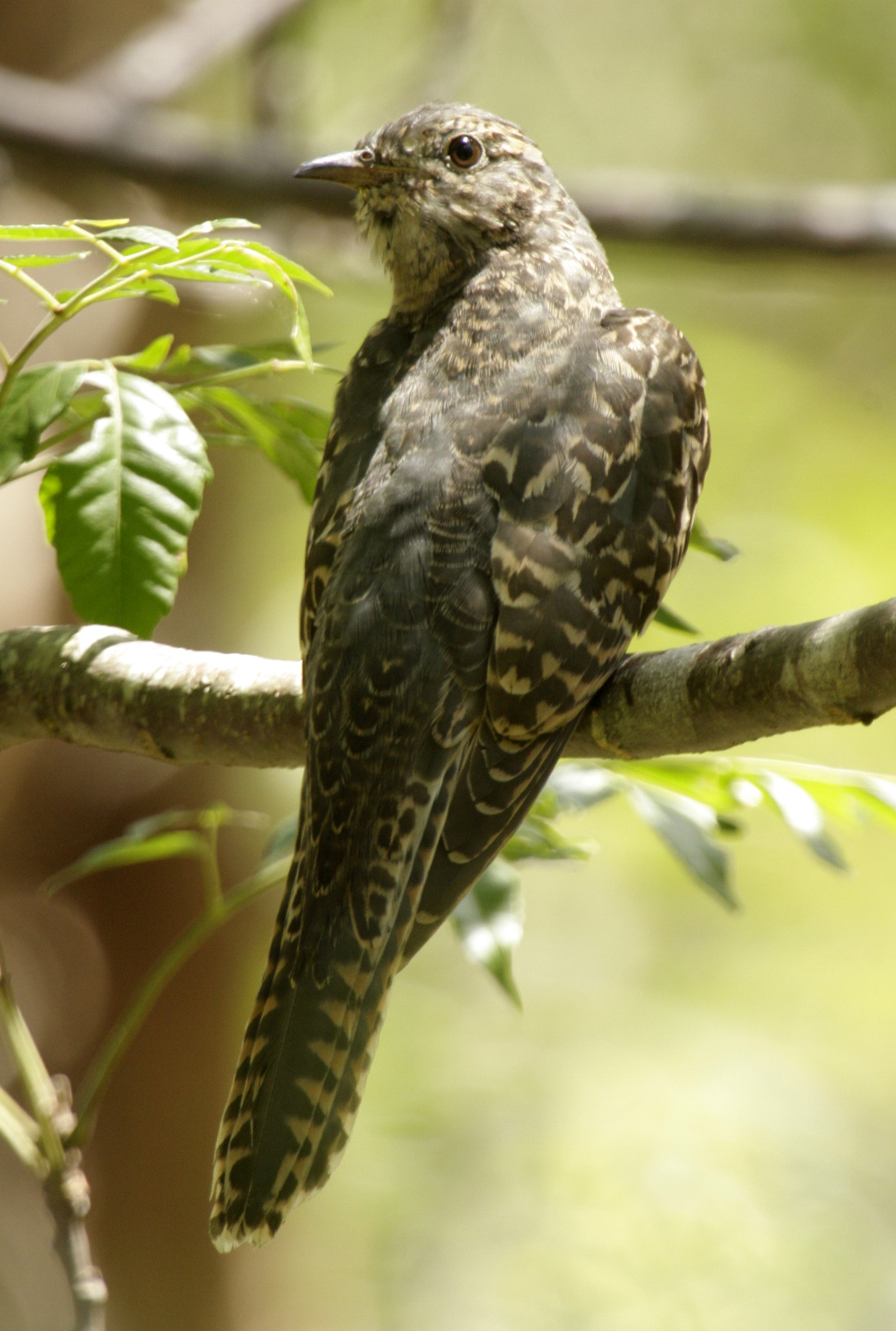
Juvenile, SE Qld

== Distribution and habitat ==
The Sahul brush cuckoo is found in northern and eastern Australia, the Solomon Islands, New Guinea, Malaysia, and other islands to the north of Australia. It is resident in parts of its range, such as in Thailand, peninsular Malaysia, Cambodia and southern Vietnam, the Philippines, the Greater Sunda Islands, Lesser Sunda Islands, the Maluku Islands and Timor. It may migrate locally in New Guinea and northern Melanesia. In Australia, it is migratory in the southern part of its range.

In Australia, it is known to inhabit a range of environments including rainforests, rainforest edges, mangrove forests, secondary forests, and plantations.

== Ecology ==
The Sahul brush cuckoo is a brood parasite. Its eggs are polymorphic, meaning females lay specific egg types for specific hosts. In Australia, females lay three types of egg depending on their major host in the relevant region of their distribution.

Across its Australian range the Sahul brush cuckoo exploits at least 58 other avian species, though only a small number of species have been observed raising chicks through fledging. The species observed to raise chicks through fledging vary by subspecies of the Sahul brush cuckoo. For C. v. dumetorum they include the purple-crowned fairywren, brown-backed honeyeater, bar-breasted honeyeater and for C. v. variolosus they include the rose robin, Norfolk robin, leaden flycatcher, restless flycatcher, satin flycatcher, rufous fantail and grey fantail.

In Indonesia, observed hosts of the local subspecies of Sahul brush cuckoo include the grey-headed canary-flycatcher, Javan blue flycatcher, snowy-browed flycatcher, Sunda forktail, long-tailed shrike, striated grassbird, sooty-headed bulbul, yellow-vented bulbul, Malaysian pied fantail, rufous-tailed fantail, pied bush chat, Buru white-eye and Sangkar white-eye.

== Media ==
Song Kobble Creek, SE Queensland, Australia
