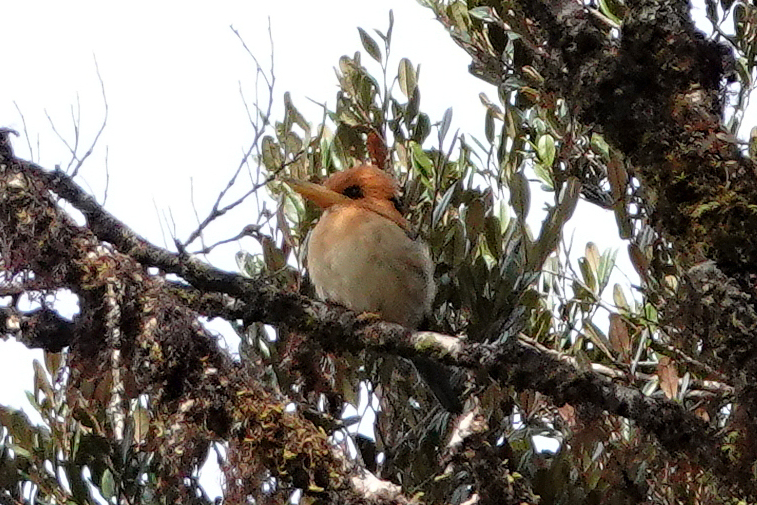

Conservation status
- Least Concern (IUCN 3.1)

Scientific classification
- Kingdom: Animalia
- Phylum: Chordata
- Class: Aves
- Order: Coraciiformes
- Family: Alcedinidae
- Subfamily: Halcyoninae
- Genus: Syma
- Species: S. megarhyncha

Binomial name
- Syma megarhyncha Salvadori, 1896

Subspecies
- S. m. sellamontis - Reichenow, 1919; S. m. megarhyncha - Salvadori, 1896

Synonyms
- Halcyon megarhyncha

= Mountain kingfisher =

Species of kingfisher endemic to New Guinea

The mountain kingfisher (Syma megarhyncha) is a species of bird in the subfamily Halcyoninae in the family Alcedinidae. Adult males are 21–24 cm (8.3–9.4 in) long, and have a rufous head and underparts, greenish-blue upperparts, a dark blue tail, and black flight feathers. They also have dark neck patches and loral patches. Females have dark crowns and the neck patches join at the nape. It is similar to the yellow-billed kingfisher, but can be distinguished by its larger size and a proportionally larger bill, along with a dark ridge along its culmen.

It is endemic to New Guinea, where it is found through most of the New Guinea Highlands, except for the Bird's Head Peninsula. Its natural habitats are subtropical or tropical moist lowland forest and subtropical or tropical moist montane forest. It is found at elevations between 1,200–2,400 m (3,900–7,900 ft), although it has also been reported as low as 700 m (2,300 ft).

It feeds on small lizards, larvae, and insects. It lays eggs in December, and eggs are laid in clutches of two. The IUCN classifies it as a least-concern species.

== Taxonomy and systematics ==
The mountain kingfisher was described as Syma megarhycha by Tommaso Salvadori in 1896, on the basis of specimens collected in 1893 in Moroka, New Guinea. The generic name Syma is from the name of a sea nymph in Greek mythology. The specific name come from the Greek megas (great) and rhunkhos (bill). Mountain kingfisher has been designated as the official common name by the International Ornithologists' Union (IOC). The species is also known as the greater yellow-billed kingfisher or mountain yellow-billed kingfisher.

It is one of two species in the genus Syma, along with the yellow-billed kingfisher. These two species are closely related and were previously considered conspecific. Hybrids between them have also been recorded.

=== Subspecies ===
There are two recognised subspecies of the mountain kingfisher:

- S. m. megarhyncha Salvadori, 1896: The nominate subspecies, it is found western, central, and northeastern New Guinea. Populations from western New Guinea, the Snow Mountains, and the Weyland Mountains are sometimes separated as S. m. wellsi, on the basis of slight differences in body and bill size.
- S. m. sellamontis Reichenow, 1919: Found in northeastern New Guinea, in the mountains of the Huon peninsula. It was originally described as a separate species in 1919 on the basis of differences in the colour of the culmen. It has an all-yellow bill in comparison to the nominate, which has a dark ridge along the culmen. It is also smaller in size.

As these two subspecies are poorly defined, some authors have considered lumping the two, which would make the species monotypic.

== Description ==
It is a small kingfisher, with males weighing 52–60 g (1.8–2.1 oz) and females weighing 49–63 g (1.7–2.2 oz). Adults are between 21–24 cm (8.3–9.4 in) in length.

Males have a rufous head and underparts and greenish-blue upperparts, along with black loral and nape patches. The tail is dark blue and it has black wing feathers with bluish edges and tips. Females have a black crown and paler underparts. The neck patches are joined at the nape in females, making a bar across the back of the neck. The bill is bright yellow with a dark ridge along the culmen. The iris is dark brown and the feet and legs are dull yellow. Juveniles have a grayish-black bill and mottled-black ear coverts. They also have a larger black area around the eye and dark-tipped feathers on the cheeks and breast.

The yellow-billed kingfisher is similar in appearance, but has an all-yellow bill instead and is found at lower altitudes than the mountain kingfisher. It is also larger with a proportionally larger bill.

=== Vocalisations ===
It typically vocalises from the canopy and mid-story. It has a loud whistled trilling call, typically composed of 3–4 descending trills separated by pauses. The song ends with a distinctive trill that drops, rises and drops in pitch. The initial trills are similar to the song of the chestnut-breasted cuckoo, but are longer and richer, and the cuckoo's song is much higher-pitched. The song is also similar to that of the yellow-billed kingfisher, but is deeper than that of the latter.

== Distribution and habitat ==
The mountain kingfisher is endemic to the island of New Guinea, and is found in both Western New Guinea and Papua New Guinea. It is common to uncommon through most of the New Guinea Highlands, except for the Bird's Head peninsula. Reports of the species from the Adelbert Mountains and the Foja Mountains are unconfirmed. The species mostly occurs between elevations of 1,200–2,400 m (3,900–7,900 ft), although they have been reported at elevations as low as 700 m (2,300 ft). At lower elevations, the species is replaced by the yellow-billed kingfisher.

The mountain kingfisher mainly inhabits primary forest and secondary growth within its range.

== Behaviour and ecology ==
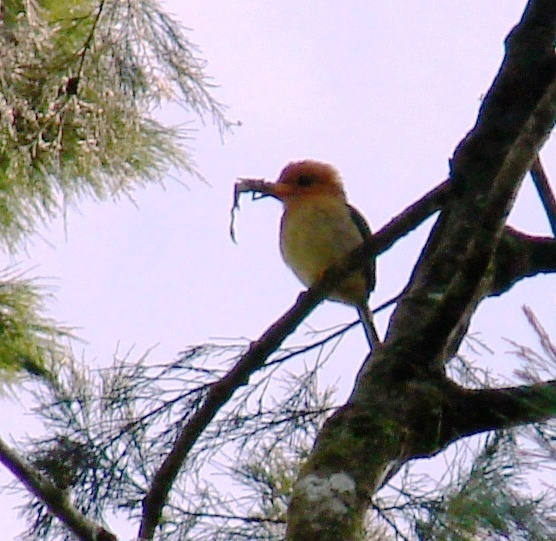
Mountain kingfisher feeding

It feeds on small lizards, insects, and larvae. It hunts by perching in middle and upper canopy for long periods of time, before diving to capture prey. Nests are dug into earthen riverbanks and dry timber. On Papua New Guinea, eggs are laid in December. Eggs are laid in clutches of two and are white in color.

== Status ==
The mountain kingfisher's population has not been quantified. However, due to its relatively large range and stable population, the IUCN lists it as a least concern species. It is reported as being fairly common locally but rare generally across New Guinea.
