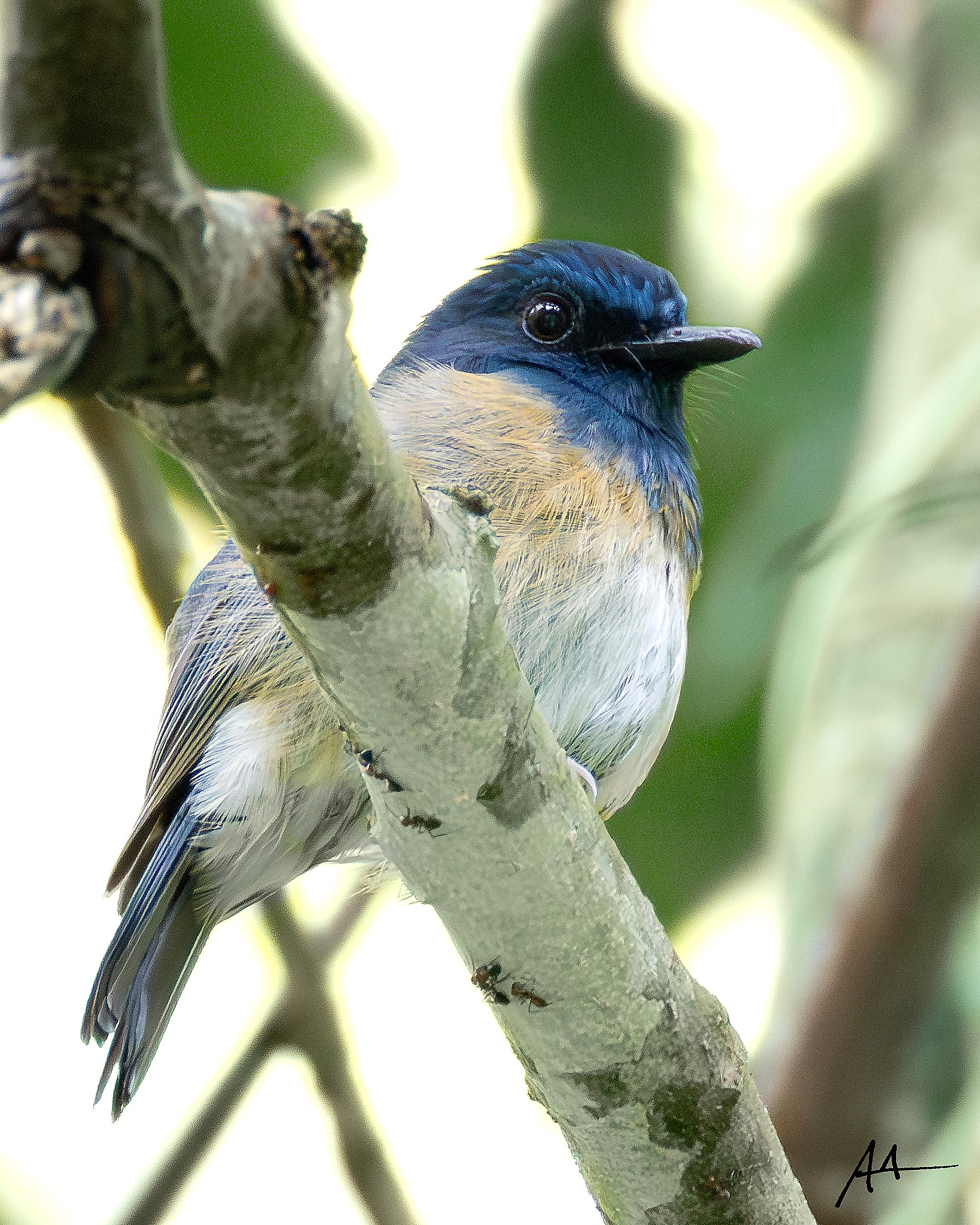
- Male

Conservation status
- Near Threatened (IUCN 3.1)

Scientific classification
- Kingdom: Animalia
- Phylum: Chordata
- Class: Aves
- Order: Passeriformes
- Family: Muscicapidae
- Genus: Cyornis
- Species: C. herioti

Binomial name
- Cyornis herioti Wardlaw-Ramsay, RG, 1886

= Blue-breasted blue flycatcher =

Species of bird

The blue-breasted blue flycatcher (Cyornis herioti), also known as the blue-breasted flycatcher, is a species of bird in the family Muscicapidae. It is endemic to the Philippines found only north and central parts of Luzon. Its natural habitat is tropical moist lowland forests. The Rufous-breasted blue flycatcher (Cyornis camarinensis) was formerly considered to be a subspecies.

== Description and taxonomy ==
This species is a flycatcher found in the understory of lowland forest. This species exhibits sexual dimorphism, which is typical of the Cyornis family. Male has a indigo throat, chest and upperparts. It has a pale blue forehead and brow. Females on the otherhand has a brown back, reddish-brown wings and tails, a pale eyebrow and an orange throat. Both male and the female have a grayish white belly with light orange fringing.

This species is often confused with the Mangrove blue flycatcher and the Blue-and-white flycatcher but is differentiated from the former with its white instead of yellow belly and a larger bill. it is differentiated from the latter with its blue versus black breast.

It was formerly conspecific with the rufous-breasted blue flycatcher from south Luzon. It was split as a separate species based on the male's eponymous blue breast. As the rufous-breasted flycatcher is an extremely rare bird and there are barely and specimens, the differences between the two species' females are poorly understood.

== Ecology and behaviour ==
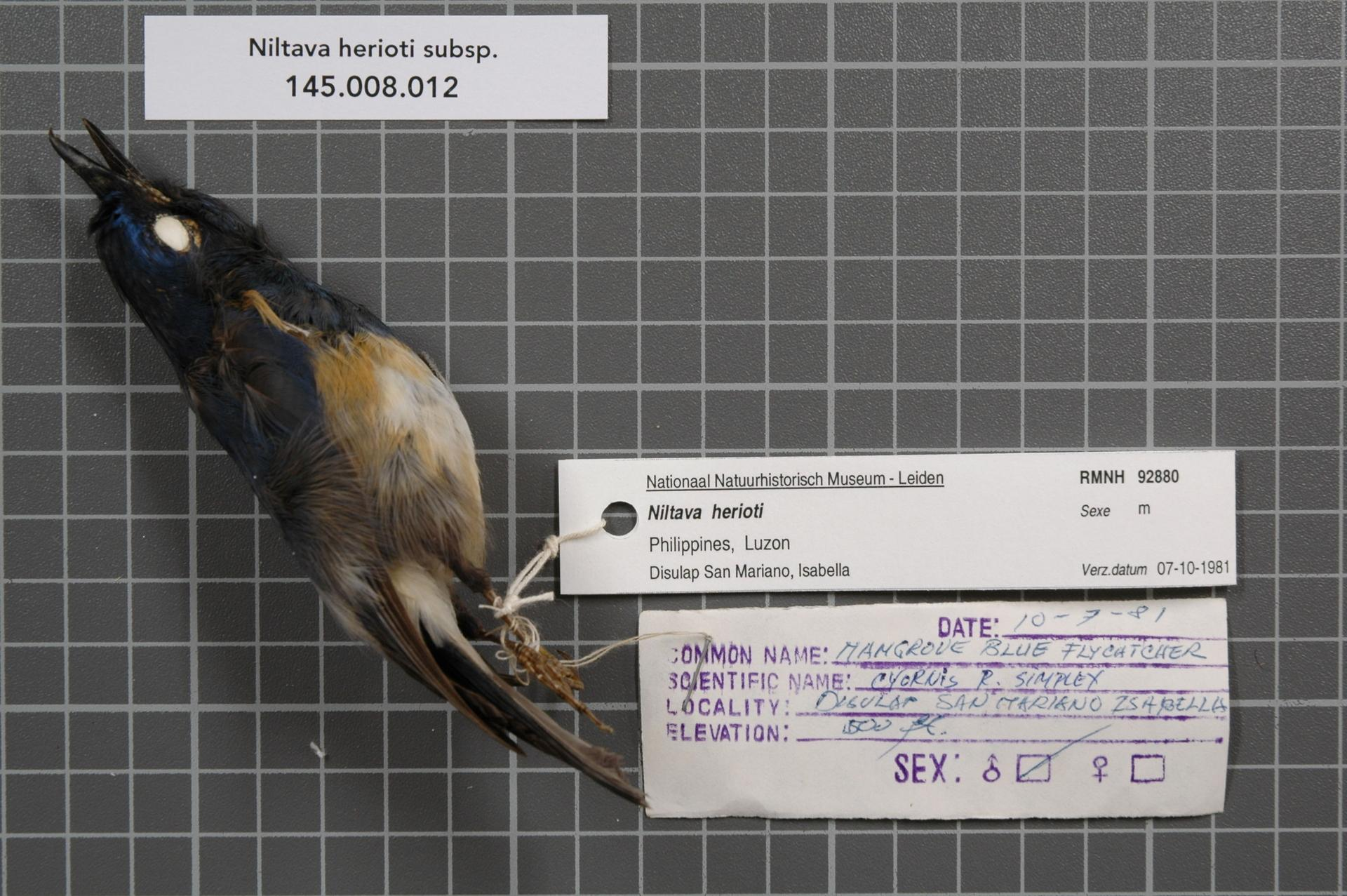
A male specimen from the Naturalis Biodiversity Center

This species is poorly known. Stomach contents from specimens taken contained insects. This species forages close to the forest floor in the dense understorey. It is extremely unobtrusive and is usually alone or in a pair.

Its exact breeding season is still unknown. Males found in breeding condition with enlarged testes found in May to July. A juvenile was seen in April to May. The only recorded nest was recorded in May in a shallow cavity on a rock along a stream. This nest was cup-shaped lined with ferns and an outer layer of moss and contained three eggs.

Nest parasitism by the Sunda brush cuckoo has been recorded.

== Habitat and conservation status ==
Its natural habitat is tropical moist lowland forest up to 1,200 m. It is often seen in lowland and foothill forest and secondary forest with bamboo,. The IUCN Redlist has classified this species as near threatened. Its threats are mainly habitat loss due to deforestation for lumber, mining and farmlands. There are no known targeted conservation actions for this bird, but it will indirectly benefit from the conservation of other north Luzon species like the critically endangered Isabela oriole. The stronghold of the Isabela oriole in Baggao is being proposed as a protected area and will thus preserve key habitat for this bird.

It is found in a few protected areas includings Mount Makiling, Quezon Protected Landscape, Northern Sierra Madre Natural Park, Aurora Memorial National Park and Kalbario–Patapat Natural Park but actual protection from deforestation is still lax.
