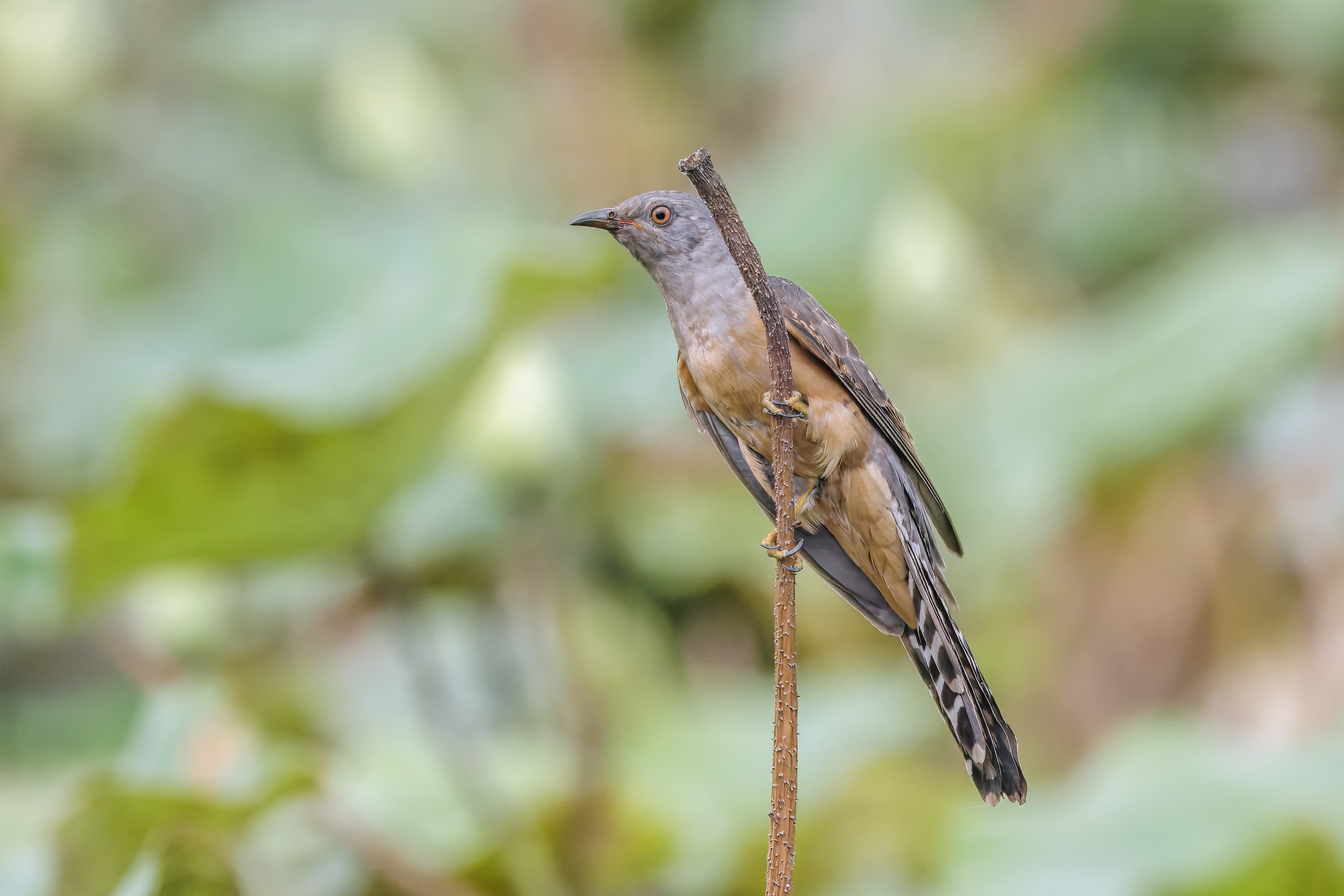
- male
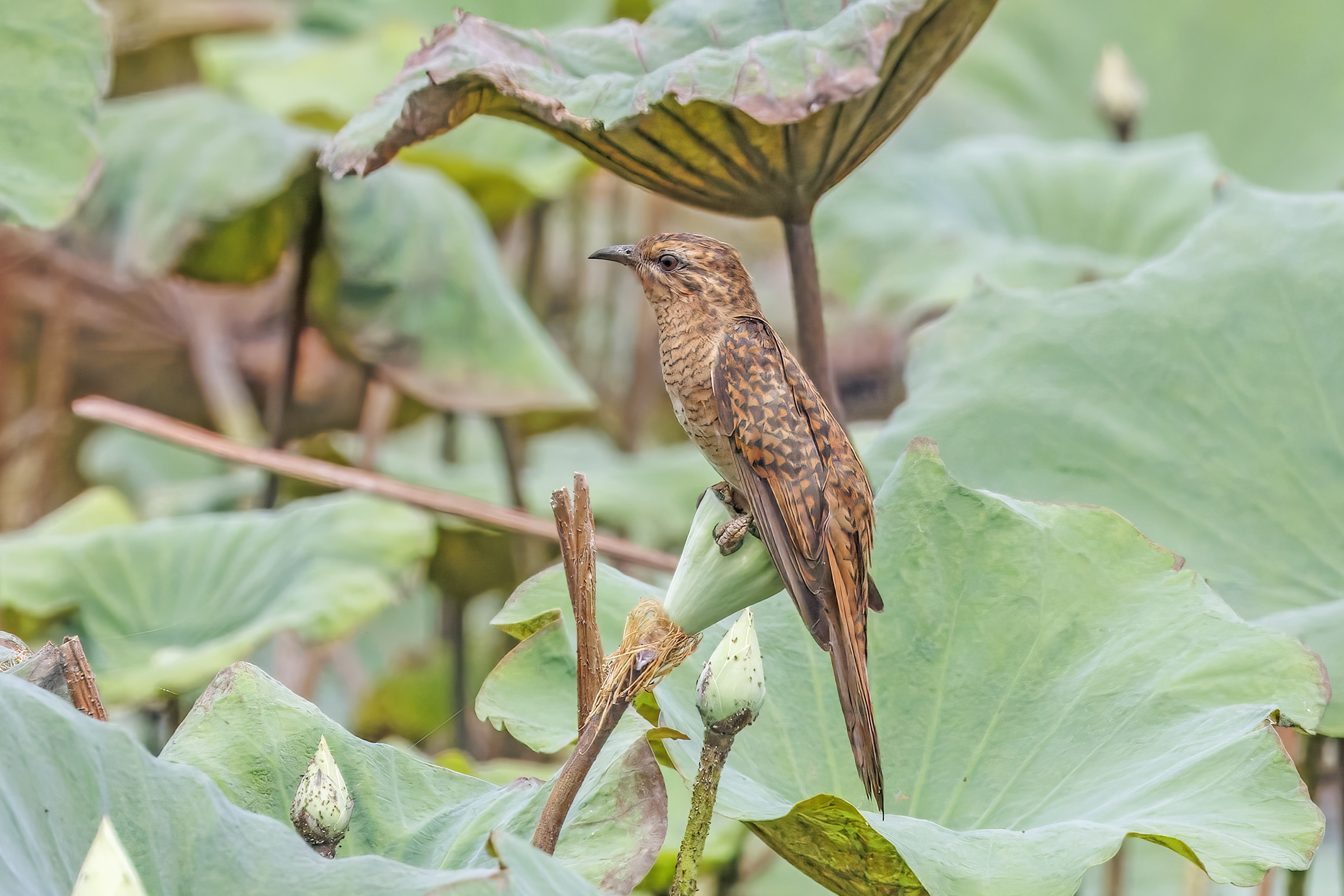
- female both in Cambodia

Conservation status
- Least Concern (IUCN 3.1)

Scientific classification
- Kingdom: Animalia
- Phylum: Chordata
- Class: Aves
- Order: Cuculiformes
- Family: Cuculidae
- Genus: Cacomantis
- Species: C. merulinus

Binomial name
- Cacomantis merulinus (Scopoli, 1786)

= Plaintive cuckoo =

Species of bird

The plaintive cuckoo (Cacomantis merulinus) is a species of bird belonging to the genus Cacomantis in the cuckoo family Cuculidae. It is native to Asia, from India, Nepal and China to Indonesia.

== Description ==
The plaintive cuckoo is fairly small, measuring about 21–24 cm (8.3–9.4 in) long. The adult male is grey-brown above and orange below with a grey head, throat and upper breast. The tail feathers have white tips. The legs and feet are yellow, the eye is red and the bill is black above and yellow below. The adult female is sometimes similar to the male but often occurs in a "hepatic" morph. This form is reddish-brown above with dark bars. The underparts are paler with fainter barring. There is a pale stripe over the eye and the tail has dark bars along its whole length. Juvenile birds are similar to hepatic females but are paler and have dark streaks rather than bars on the crown and throat.

The male has several plaintive whistling calls. These include an ascending series of three-note phrases and a series of 11 or 12 descending notes.

== Distribution and subspecies ==
There are four subspecies. The nominate form C. m. merulinus is found in the Philippines where it is common on many of the larger islands. C. m. querulus is the most widespread form, occurring in north-east India, Bangladesh, southern China, Indonesia, Myanmar, Thailand, Cambodia, Laos and Vietnam. It is a summer visitor to most of its Chinese range, migrating south for the winter. C. m. threnodes is found in the Malay Peninsula, Sumatra and Borneo while C. m. lanceolatus occurs in Java, Bali and Sulawesi.

The grey-bellied cuckoo (C. passerinus) was formerly classified as a subspecies of the plaintive cuckoo but is now often treated as a separate species.

== Ecology ==
The plaintive cuckoo inhabits forest edge, open woodland, scrub, grassland, farmland, parks and gardens. It feeds on invertebrates. It is normally solitary and is often difficult to see.

It is a brood parasite, laying its eggs in the nests of cisticolas, prinias and tailorbirds. The eggs are similar to those of the host species but are larger. Small birds often mob the cuckoo to drive it away from their nests.
