= Manus brush cuckoo =

Scientific classification
- Kingdom: Animalia
- Phylum: Chordata
- Class: Aves
- Order: Cuculiformes
- Family: Cuculidae
- Genus: Cacomantis
- Species: C. blandus

Binomial name
- Cacomantis blandus Rothschild & Hartert, EJO, 1914

Synonyms
- Cacomantis variolosus blandus

Species of bird

The Manus brush cuckoo (Cacomantis blandus) is a species of cuckoo in the family Cuculidae. It is found on the Ninigo and Admiralty Islands which lie to the north of New Guinea. The species was formerly considered as conspecific with the Sahul brush cuckoo (Cacomantis variolosus).

== Taxonomy ==
The Manus brush cuckoo was formally described in 1914 by the English zoologist Water Rothschild together with the German ornithologist Ernst Hartert under the binomial name Cacomantis blandus. They specified the type location as the island of Manus in the Admiralty Islands. The genus name is from the Ancient Greek κακομαντις (kakomantis) meaning "prophet of evil". The specific epithet blandus is Latin meaning "flattering", "fawning", "alluring" or "agreeable". This species was formerly considered a subspecies of the Sahul brush cuckoo (Cacomantis variolosus). It was elevated to species status based on the significant differences in morphology and vocalization. The species is monotypic: no subspecies are recognised.
