= Solomons brush cuckoo =

Scientific classification
- Kingdom: Animalia
- Phylum: Chordata
- Class: Aves
- Order: Cuculiformes
- Family: Cuculidae
- Genus: Cacomantis
- Species: C. addendus

Binomial name
- Cacomantis addendus Rothschild & Hartert, EJO, 1901

Synonyms
- Cacomantis variolosus addendus

Species of bird

The Solomons brush cuckoo (Cacomantis addendus) is a species of cuckoo in the family Cuculidae. It is found on the Solomon Islands apart from Rennell Island. The species was formerly considered as conspecific with the Sahul brush cuckoo (Cacomantis variolosus).

== Taxonomy ==
The Solomons brush cuckoo was formally described in 1901 by Water Rothschild and Ernst Hartert based on specimens collected on the island of Kolombangara in the Solomon Islands. They coined the current binomial name Cacomantis addendus. The genus name is from Ancient Greek κακομαντις (kakomantis) meaning "prophet of evil". The specific epithet addendus is Latin meaning "that which is to be added" or "addendum". This species was formerly considered a subspecies of the Sahul brush cuckoo (Cacomantis variolosus). It was elevated to species status based on the significant differences in morphology and vocalization. The species is monotypic: no subspecies are recognised.
