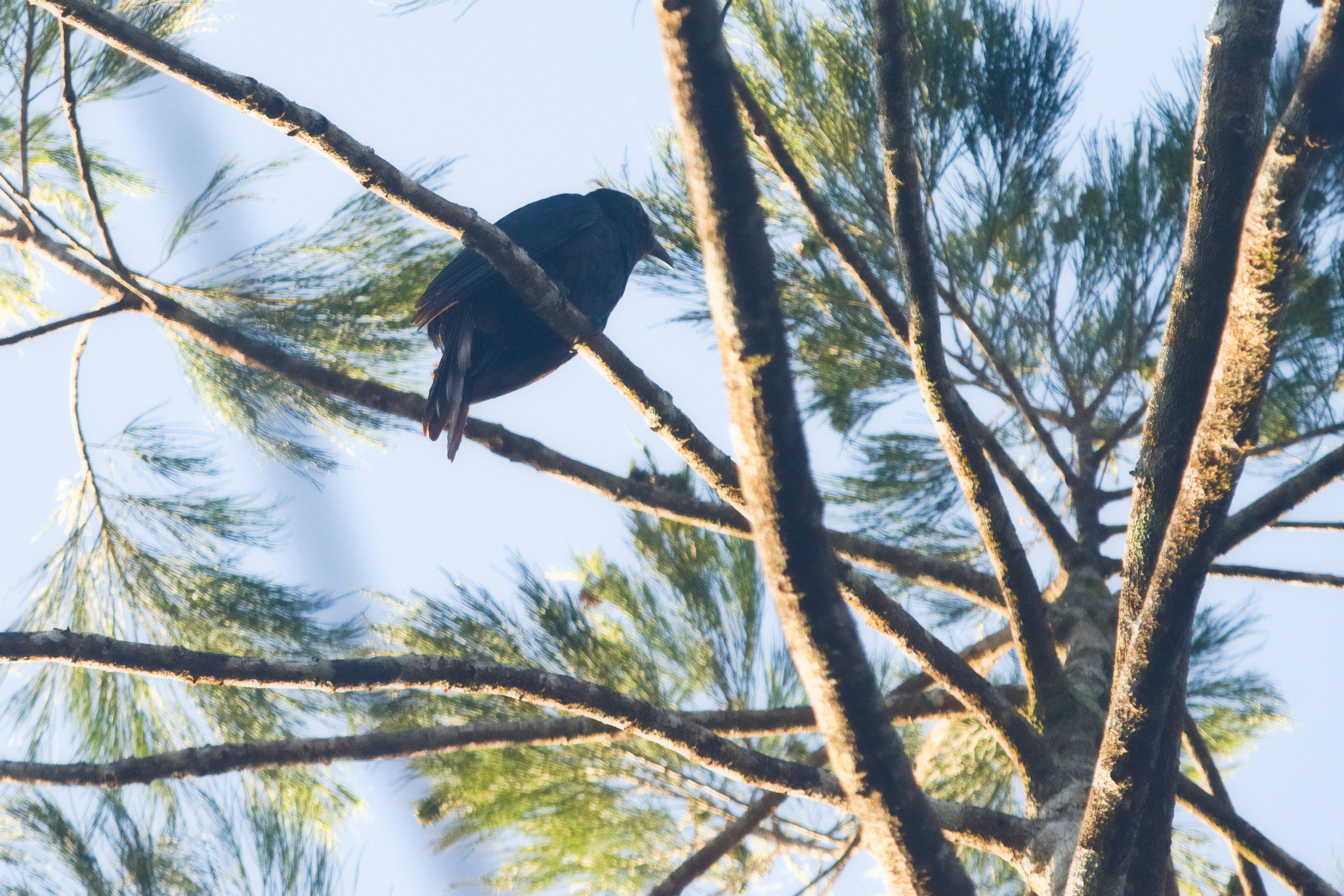

Conservation status
- Least Concern (IUCN 3.1)

Scientific classification
- Kingdom: Animalia
- Phylum: Chordata
- Class: Aves
- Order: Cuculiformes
- Family: Cuculidae
- Genus: Caliechthrus; Cabanis & Heine 1862
- Species: C. leucolophus

Binomial name
- Caliechthrus leucolophus (Müller, S, 1840)

Synonyms
- Cacomantis leucolophus

= White-crowned cuckoo =

Species of bird

The white-crowned cuckoo or white-crowned koel (Caliechthrus leucolophus) is a species of cuckoo in the family Cuculidae. It was formerly placed in the genus Cacomantis but is now the only species placed in the genus Caliechthrus. It is found in New Guinea and neighbouring Salawati Island.

It was originally described in 1840 by the German naturalist Salomon Müller as Cuculus leucolophus.
