= Rufous-breasted blue flycatcher =

Conservation status
- Near Threatened (IUCN 3.1)

Scientific classification
- Kingdom: Animalia
- Phylum: Chordata
- Class: Aves
- Order: Passeriformes
- Family: Muscicapidae
- Genus: Cyornis
- Species: C. camarinensis

Binomial name
- Cyornis camarinensis (Rand & Rabor, 1967)

Species of bird

The rufous-breasted blue flycatcher (Cyornis camarinensis) is a species of bird in the family Muscicapidae. It is endemic to the Philippines found on the Bicol Peninsula and Catanduanes. Its natural habitat is tropical moist lowland forests. It was formerly treated as a subspecies of the blue-breasted blue flycatcher (Cyornis herioti). This species was only photographed in the wild for the first time ever in March 2025 – prior to this there was no other documentation of this species for 17 years. This species remains one of the least documented birds in the Philippines.

== Description and taxonomy ==
This species is a flycatcher found in the understory of lowland forest. This species exhibits sexual dimorphism, which is typical of the Cyornis family. Male has deep blue upperarts, a pale dirty orange on its breast throat and a dark face. The female has a brown back, reddish-brown wings and tails, a pale eyebrow and an orange throat. Both male and the female have a grayish white belly with light orange fringing on the sides and a pale yellowish-orange throat and chest. However, these features are not well defined on literature due to a very small sample size of this bird and its rarity.

It was formerly conspecific with the blue-breasted blue flycatcher from north Luzon. It was split as a separate species based on the male's eponymous rufous breast. As this is an extremely rare bird and there are barely and specimens, the differences between the two species' females are poorly understood.

== Ecology and behaviour ==
This species is poorly known. Stomach contents from specimens taken contained insects. This species forages close to the forest floor in the dense understorey. It is extremely unobstrusive and is usually alone or in a pair.

Nothing is known about its breeding habits except that two males collected in April and May were in breeding condition and had enlarged testes. An immature male was also collected in late June.

== Habitat and conservation status ==
Its natural habitat is tropical moist lowland forest. It is seen on the undergrowth of primary forests or along forest edge.

Despite barely any documentation of this species, as of 2025, this species is assessed as near-threatened species by the International Union for Conservation of Nature. The population is believed to be declining with populations estimated between 2,500 and 10,000 mature individuals with populations believe to be declining due to ongoing habitat destruction.. Prior to 2025, this species was listed as a vulnerable species.

It is found in the protected areas in Bulusan Volcano Natural Park, Caramoan National Park and Mount Isarog but actual protection from deforestation is lax..

Conservation actions proposed are to map out this species' true distribution and to better learn about its ecology.
