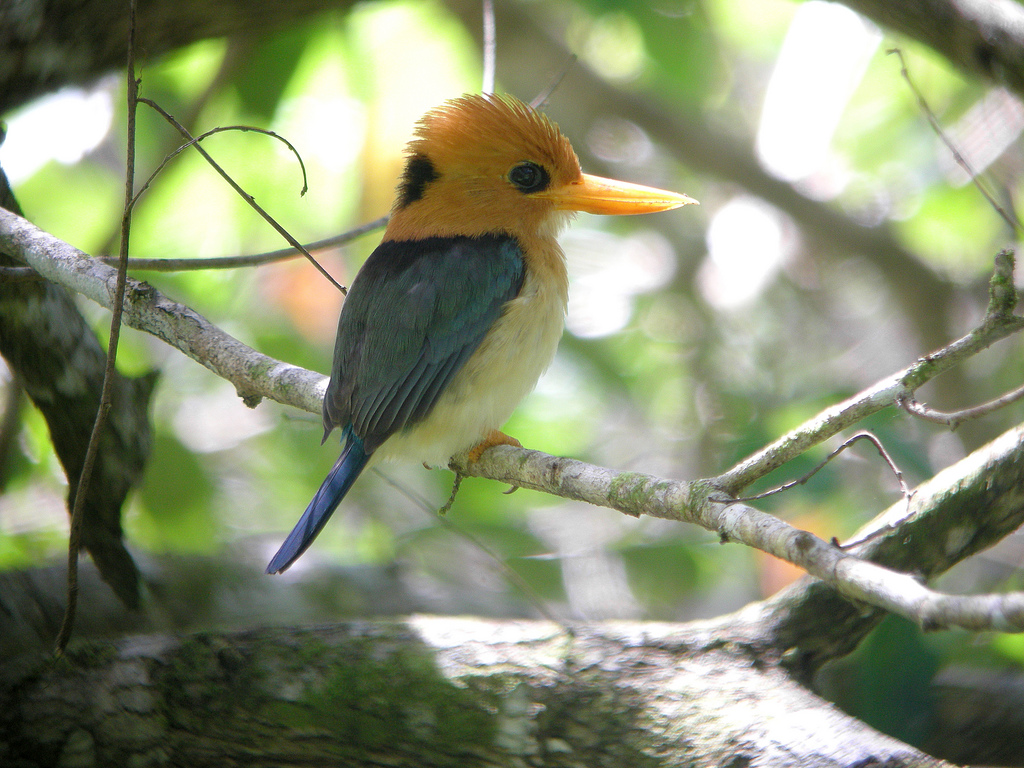
- Yellow-billed kingfisher (Syma torotoro)

Scientific classification
- Kingdom: Animalia
- Phylum: Chordata
- Class: Aves
- Order: Coraciiformes
- Family: Alcedinidae
- Subfamily: Halcyoninae
- Genus: Syma; Lesson, 1827

Type species
- Syma torotoro Lesson, 1827

= Syma =

Genus of birds

Syma is a genus of tree kingfishers in the family Alcedinidae that are resident in New Guinea and northeast Australia.

The genus was introduced by the French surgeon and naturalist René Lesson in 1827. Syma was the name of a sea nymph in Greek mythology.

The genus contains three species:

Genus Syma – Lesson, 1827 – two species
Common name	Scientific name and subspecies	Range	Size and ecology	IUCN status and estimated population
Mountain kingfisher	Syma megarhyncha Salvadori, 1896 Two subspecies: S. m. megarhyncha Salvadori, 1896; S. m. sellamontis Reichenow, 1919	New Guinea	Size: Males weighing 52–60 g (1.8–2.1 oz) and females weighing 49–63 g (1.7–2.2 oz). Adults are between 21–24 cm (8.3–9.4 in) in length. Habitat: Diet:	LC
Yellow-billed kingfisher	Syma torotoro Lesson, 1827 Two subspecies: S. t. torotoro (Lesson, 1827); S. t. flavirostris (Gould, 1850)	New Guinea and northern Cape York Peninsula in Australia	Size: 20 cm (7.9 in) long, with a wingspan of 29 cm (11 in), and it weighs 30–50 g (1.1–1.8 oz) Habitat: Diet:	LC
Ochre-bellied kingfisher	Syma ochracea Rothschild and Hartert, 1901	D'Entrecasteaux Islands	Size: Habitat: Diet:	

The adults of the three species have bright yellow bills. The mountain kingfisher is endemic to the mountainous regions of New Guinea. The yellow-billed kingfisher occurs in lowland areas of New Guinea and on the Cape York Peninsula in north eastern Australia.
