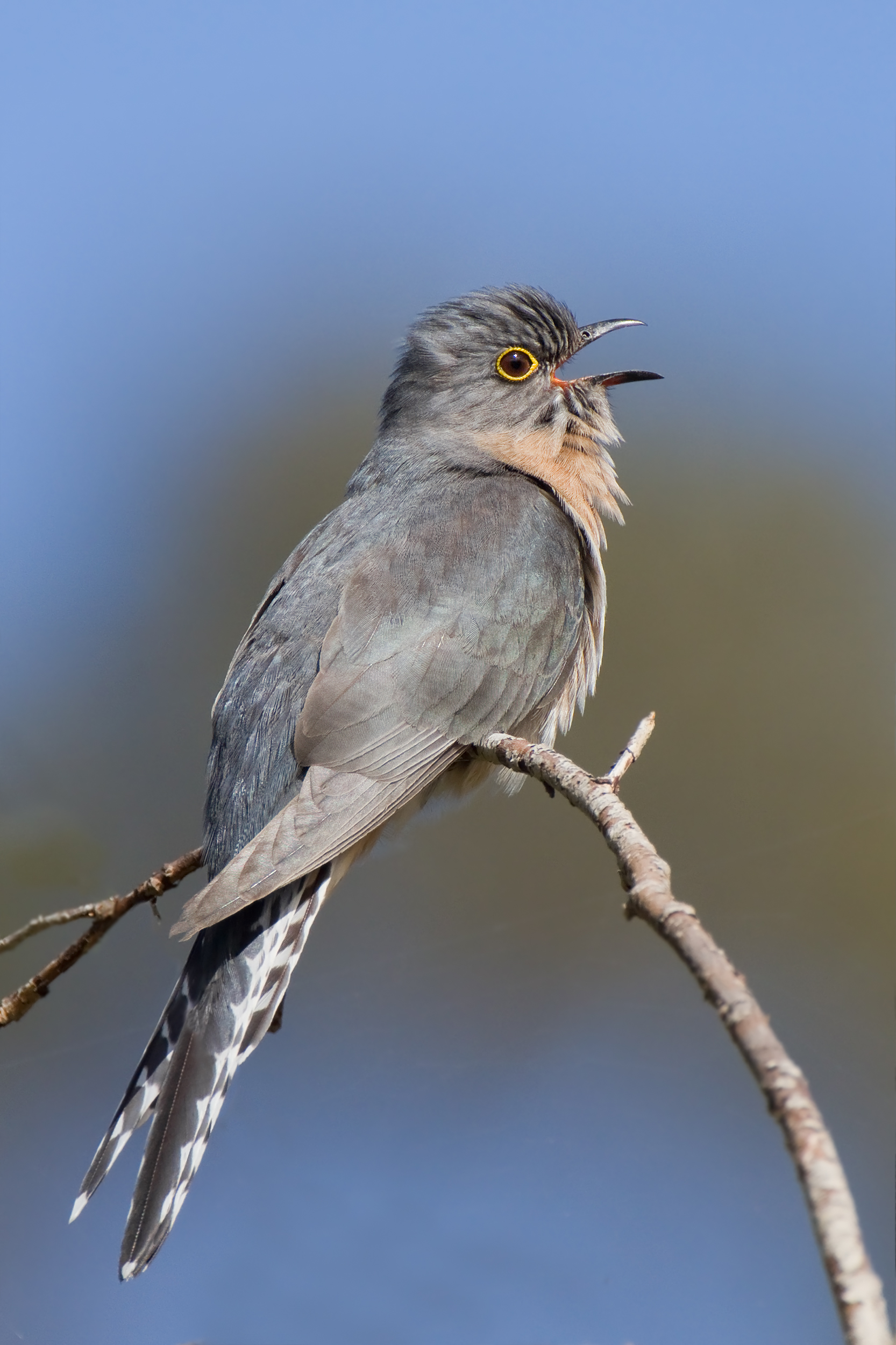
- Fan-tailed cuckoo (Cacomantis flabelliformis)

Scientific classification
- Kingdom: Animalia
- Phylum: Chordata
- Class: Aves
- Order: Cuculiformes
- Family: Cuculidae
- Genus: Cacomantis; S. Müller, 1843

Type species
- Cuculus flavus = Cuculus merulinus Gmelin, 1788

= Cacomantis =

Genus of birds

Cacomantis is a genus of cuckoos in the family Cuculidae. The name is from the Ancient Greek κακομαντις (kakomantis) meaning "prophet of evil". Most species have a round nostril and are mainly in brown and gray colours. The tails are graduated and barred. The bars are transverse in sonneratii and oblique in all others.

== Taxonomy ==
The genus Cacomantis was introduced in 1843 by the German naturalist Salomon Müller. He did not specify a type species; this was subsequently designated as Cuculus flavus Gmelin, a junior synonym of Cuculus merulinus Scopoli (the plaintive cuckoo). The genus name is from the Ancient Greek kakomantis meaning "prophet of doom". Müller explained that local people on the Maluku Islands thought of these species as "birds of misfortune" due to their mournful calls and their frequent presence in cemeteries.

=== Species ===
The genus contains 11 species:

Image	Scientific name	Common name	Distribution
	Cacomantis castaneiventris	Chestnut-breasted cuckoo	New Guinea and Cape York peninsula
	Cacomantis flabelliformis	Fan-tailed cuckoo	Australia and Melanesia
	Cacomantis sonneratii	Banded bay cuckoo	Indomalaya
	Cacomantis merulinus	Plaintive cuckoo	Southeast Asia
	Cacomantis passerinus	Grey-bellied cuckoo	South Asia
-	Cacomantis sepulcralis	Sunda brush cuckoo	Malesia
-	Cacomantis virescens	Sulawesi brush cuckoo	Sulawesi
	Cacomantis variolosus	Sahul brush cuckoo	Southeast Asia to Victoria and Solomon Islands
-	Cacomantis blandus	Manus brush cuckoo	Ninigo and Admiralty Islands
-	Cacomantis addendus	Solomons brush cuckoo	Solomon Islands archipelago
	Cacomantis aeruginosus	Moluccan brush cuckoo	Moluccas

The pallid cuckoo (Heteroscenes pallidus) and the white-crowned cuckoo (Caliechthrus leucolophus) were formerly placed in this genus. They are now each placed in their own monotypic genus.
