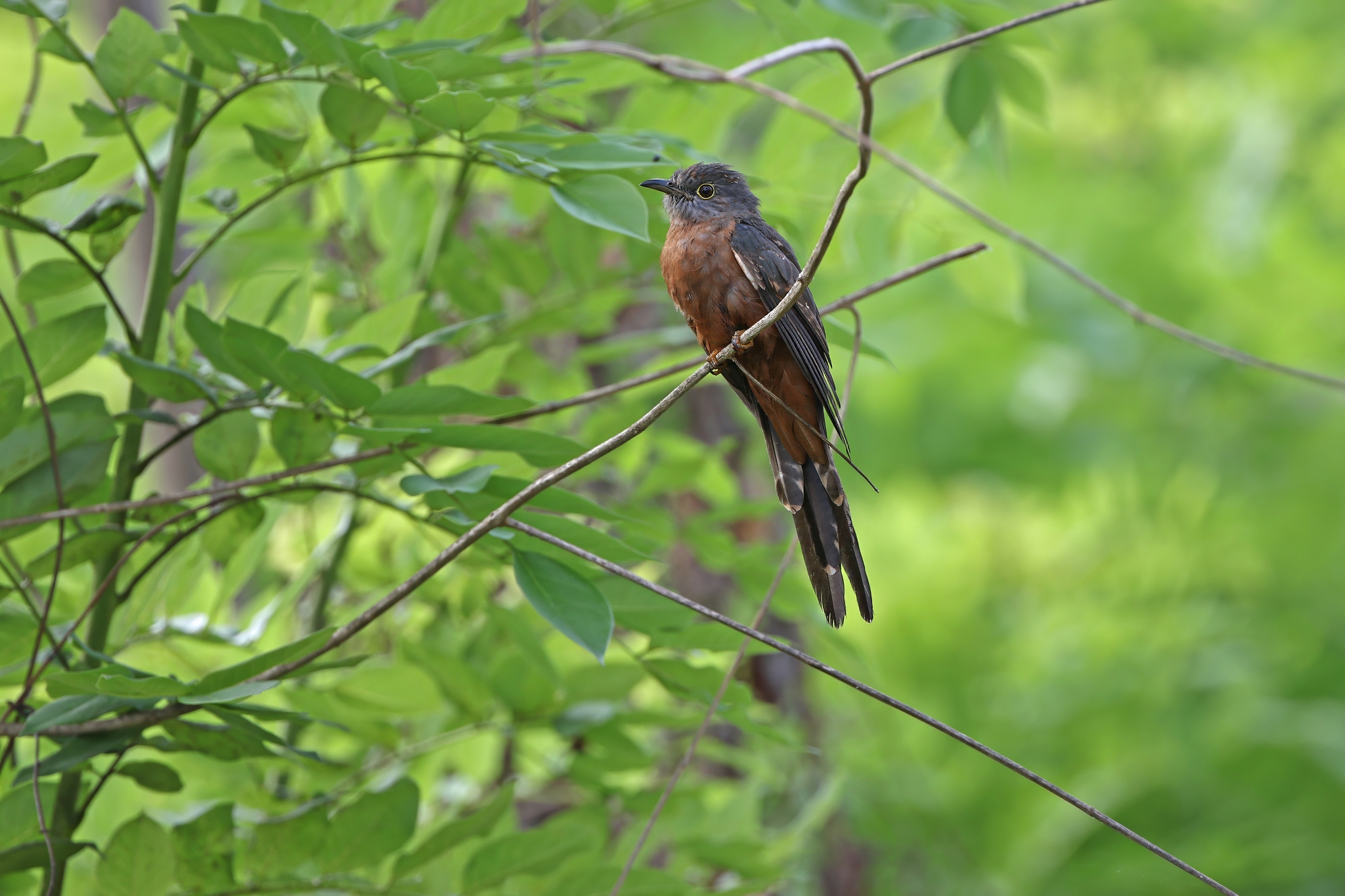

Scientific classification
- Kingdom: Animalia
- Phylum: Chordata
- Class: Aves
- Order: Cuculiformes
- Family: Cuculidae
- Genus: Cacomantis
- Species: C. virescens

Binomial name
- Cacomantis virescens (Brüggemann, 1876)

Synonyms
- Cacomantis sepulcralis virescens

= Sulawesi brush cuckoo =

Species of bird

Sulawesi Brush Cuckoo at Lore Lindu NP

The Sulawesi brush cuckoo (Cacomantis virescens) is a species of cuckoo in the family Cuculidae. It is found on Sulawesi and some surrounding islands: Banggai Islands, Sula Islands, Butung Island and the Tukangbesi Islands. Its natural habitats are subtropical or tropical moist lowland forests and subtropical or tropical moist montane forests. It is threatened by habitat loss.

== Taxonomy ==
The Sulawesi brush cuckoo was formally described in 1876 by the German zoologist Friedrich Brüggemann under the binomial name Cuculus virescens. He specified the locality as Celebes (now Sulawesi). The specific epithet is Latin meaning "greenish". It is now placed in the genus Cacomantis that was introduced in 1843 by the German naturalist Salomon Müller. The genus name is from the Ancient Greek κακομαντις (kakomantis) meaning "prophet of evil". The Sulawesi brush cuckoo was formerly treated as a subspecies of the Sunda brush cuckoo (Cacomantis sepulcralis). The combined taxa were known by the English name "rusty-breasted cuckoo". The Sulawesi brush cuckoo was elevated to species status based on the significant differences in the morphology and vocalization. The species is monotypic: no subspecies are recognised.
