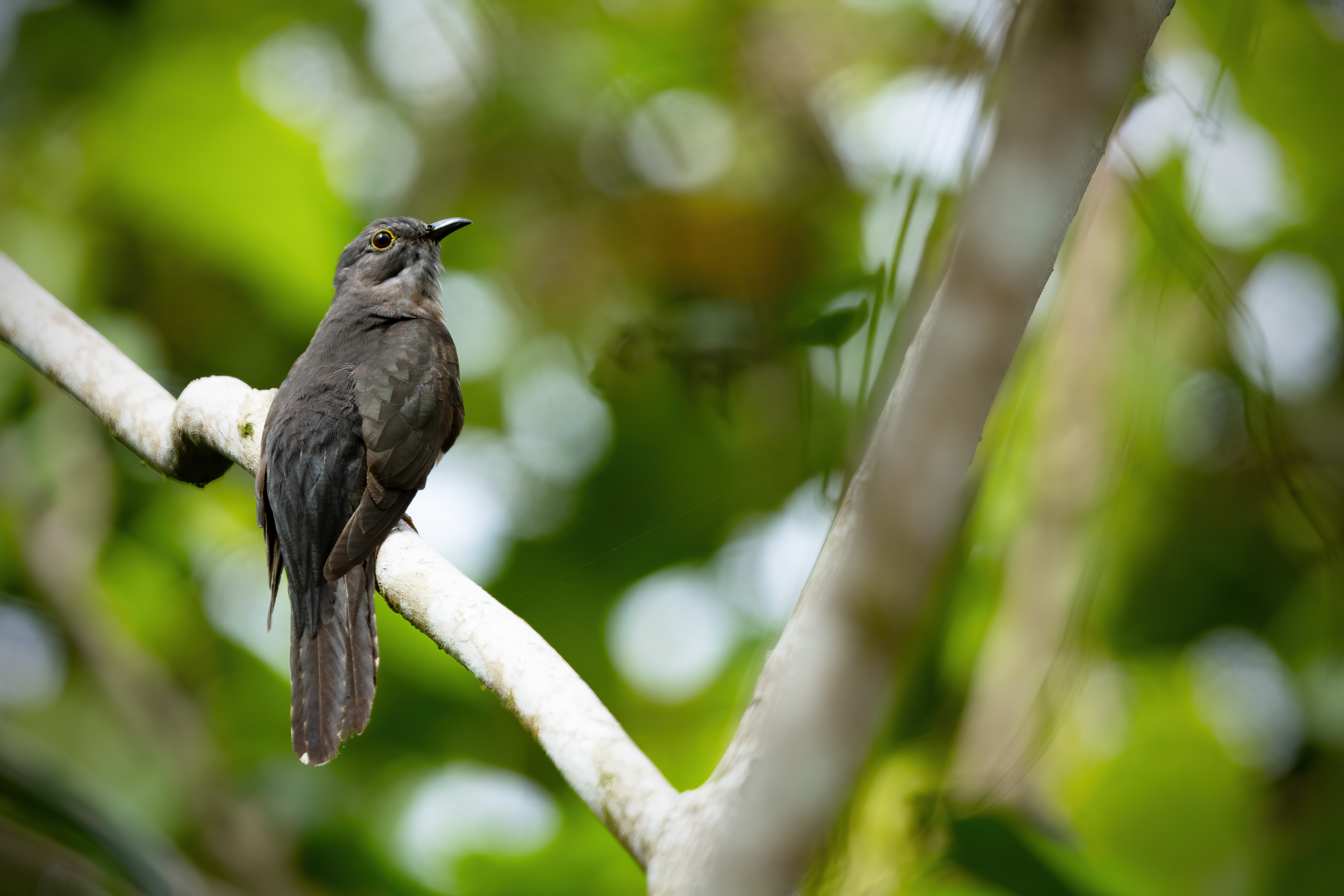

Conservation status
- Least Concern (IUCN 3.1)

Scientific classification
- Kingdom: Animalia
- Phylum: Chordata
- Class: Aves
- Order: Cuculiformes
- Family: Cuculidae
- Genus: Cacomantis
- Species: C. aeruginosus

Binomial name
- Cacomantis aeruginosus Salvadori, 1878

Synonyms
- Cacomantis heinrichi

= Moluccan brush cuckoo =

Species of bird

The Moluccan brush cuckoo (Cacomantis aeruginosus), formerly known as the Moluccan cuckoo, is a species of cuckoo in the family Cuculidae. It is native to the Maluku Islands.

Its natural habitats are subtropical or tropical moist lowland forests and subtropical or tropical moist montane forests. It is threatened by habitat loss.
