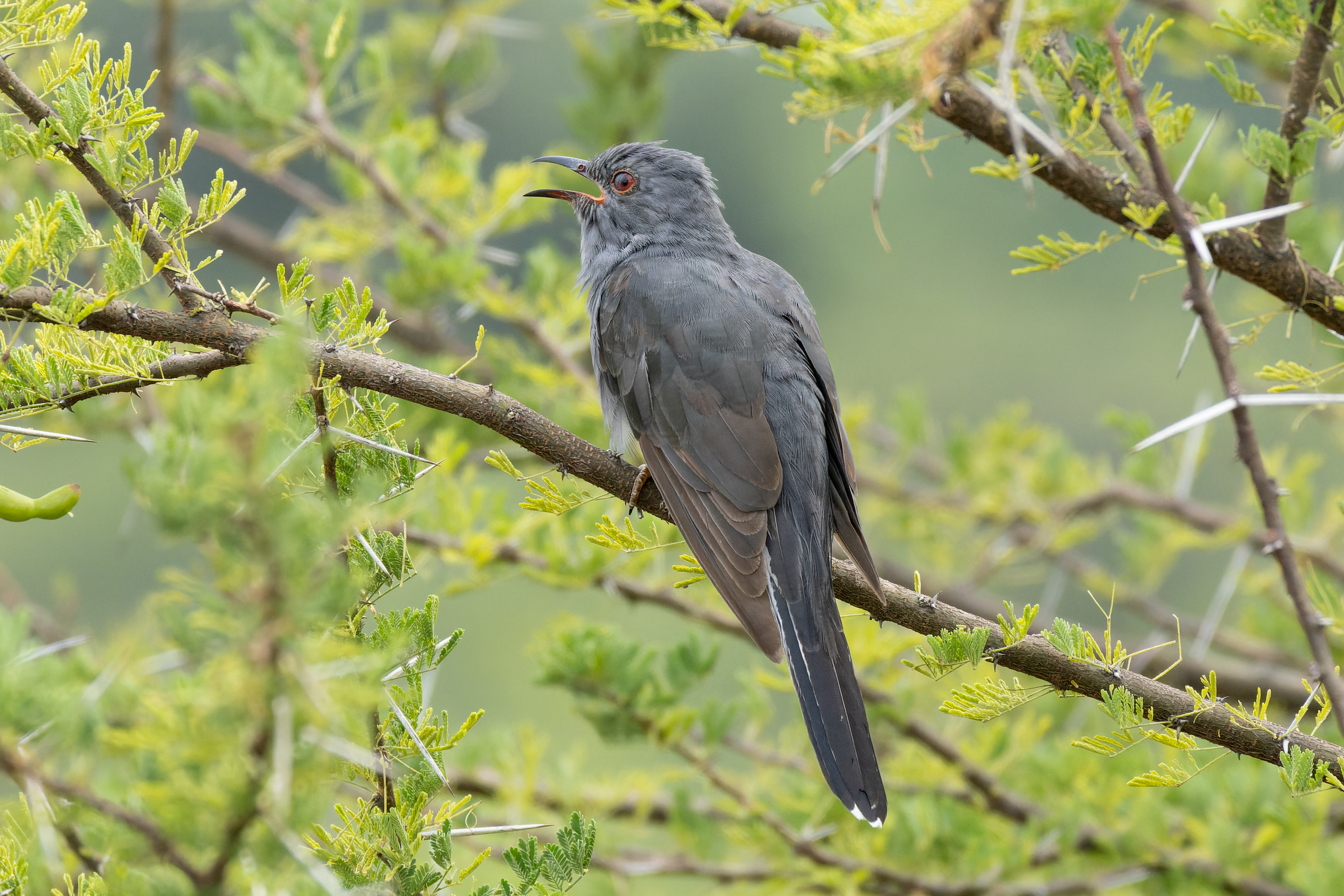
- Grey-bellied Cuckoo (Cacomantis passerinus) male in Bhigwan, Maharashtra, India.
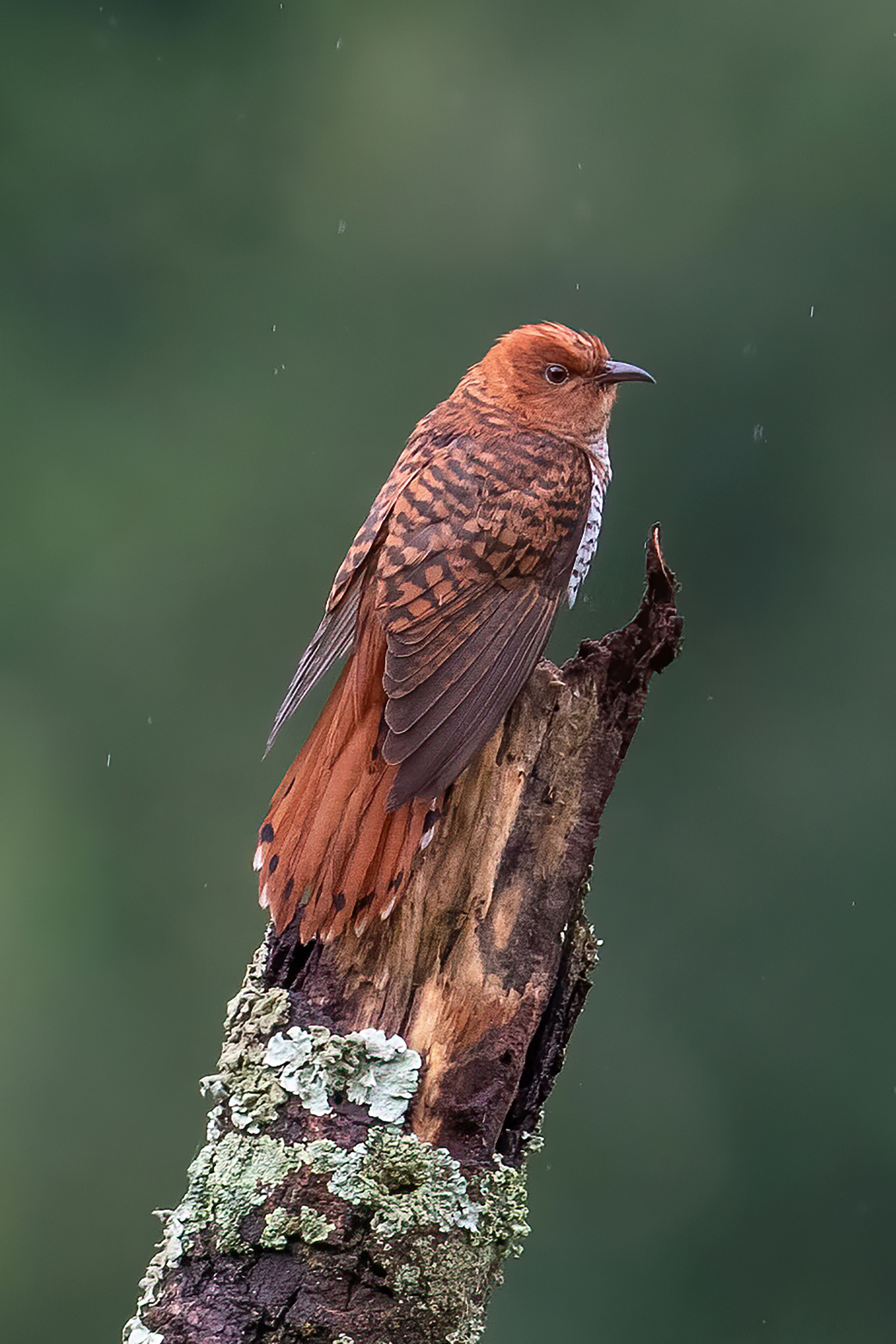
- Female at Kakani Shivapuri Nagarjun National Park, Nepal. Calls

Conservation status
- Least Concern (IUCN 3.1)

Scientific classification
- Kingdom: Animalia
- Phylum: Chordata
- Class: Aves
- Order: Cuculiformes
- Family: Cuculidae
- Genus: Cacomantis
- Species: C. passerinus

Binomial name
- Cacomantis passerinus (Vahl, 1797)

= Grey-bellied cuckoo =

Species of bird

The grey-bellied cuckoo or the Indian plaintive cuckoo (Cacomantis passerinus) is a cuckoo with widespread occurrence throughout Asia.

== Description ==
The grey-bellied cuckoo is one of the smaller cuckoos, at a total length of about 23 cm. Adults are mainly grey with a white lower belly and undertail. There is a white patch on the wings. Some females are dark-barred reddish brown above with an unbarred tail and have strongly dark-barred whitish underparts. The juvenile resembles the female but is of a duller grey.

== Distribution and habitat ==
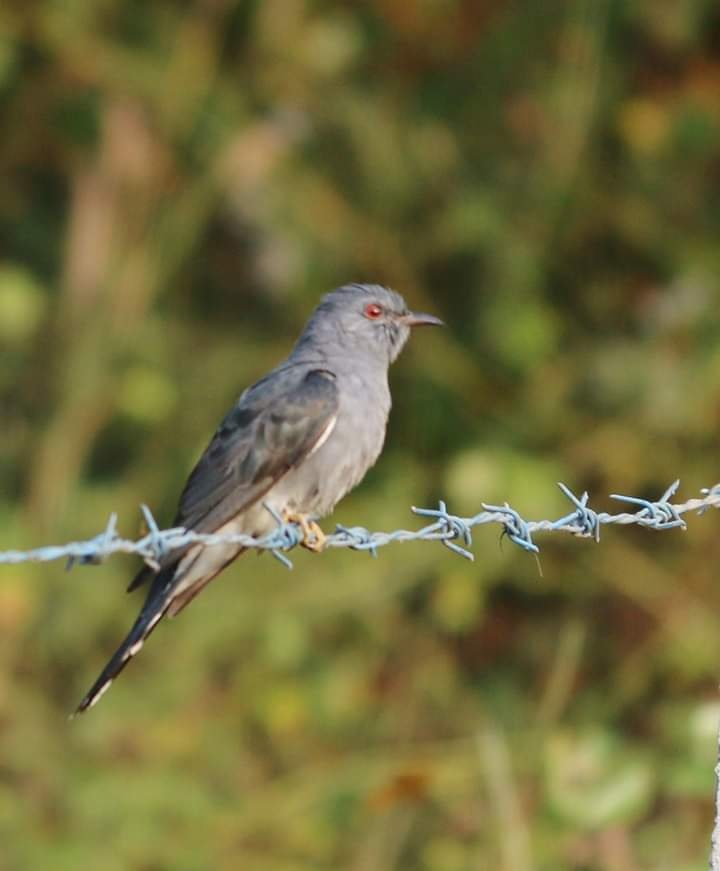
Grey bellied cuckoo

The grey-bellied cuckoo breeds in tropical southern Asia from India and Sri Lanka to south China and Indonesia. It has been reported from Bangladesh, Bhutan, India, the Maldives, Myanmar, Nepal, Pakistan, and Sri Lanka. It is a short-distance migrant, since birds at more northerly latitudes and on higher ground are summer visitors, leaving for warmer areas in winter. The species prefers light woodland and cultivated areas.

== Ecology ==
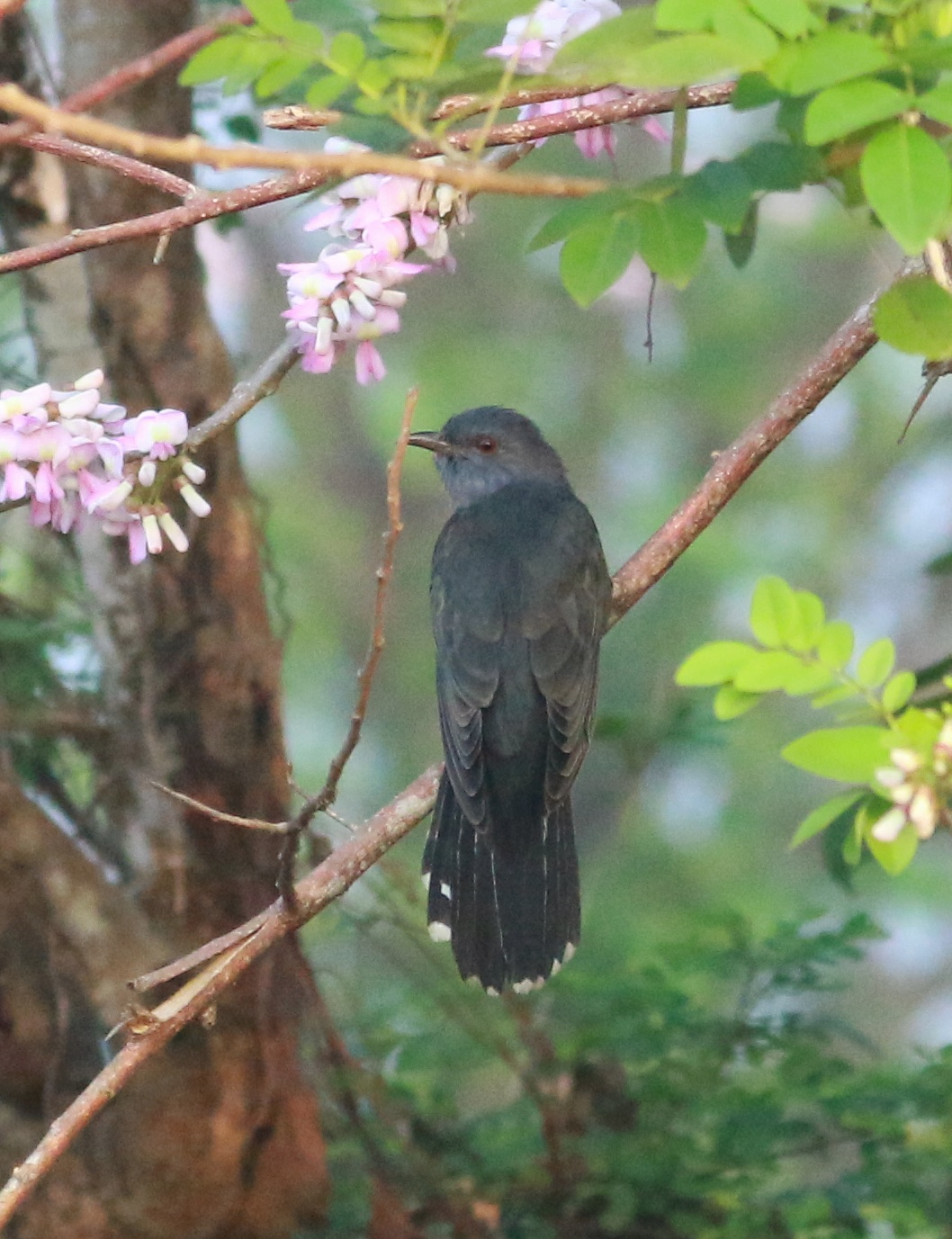
Grey-bellied Cuckoo(Cacomantis passerinus)

The grey-bellied cuckoo is a brood parasite and uses warblers as hosts. It lays a single egg. Its diet consists of a variety of insects and caterpillars. This is a noisy species, with a persistent and loud pee-pip-pee-pee call, with its tail depressed.

== Gallery ==
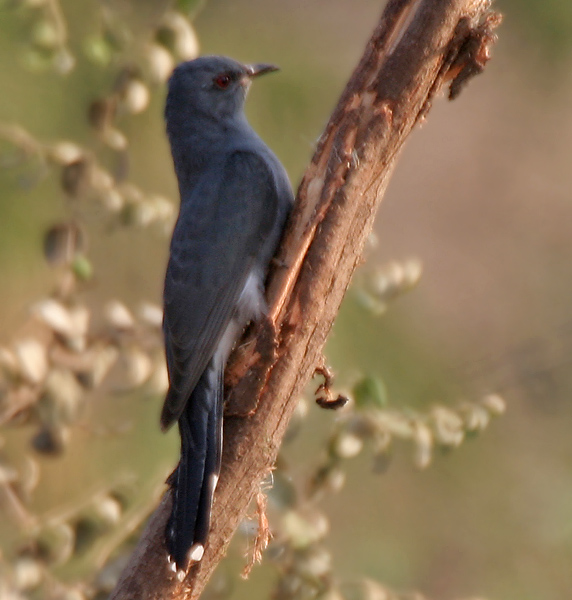
In Kinnerasani Wildlife Sanctuary, Andhra Pradesh, India.

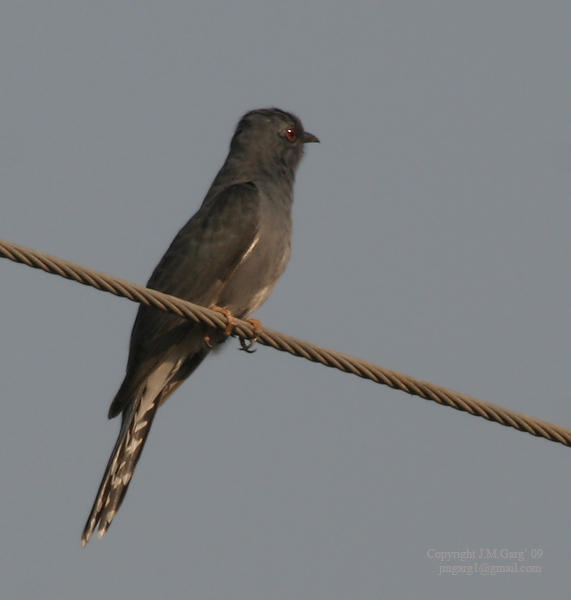
In Kinnerasani Wildlife Sanctuary, Andhra Pradesh, India.

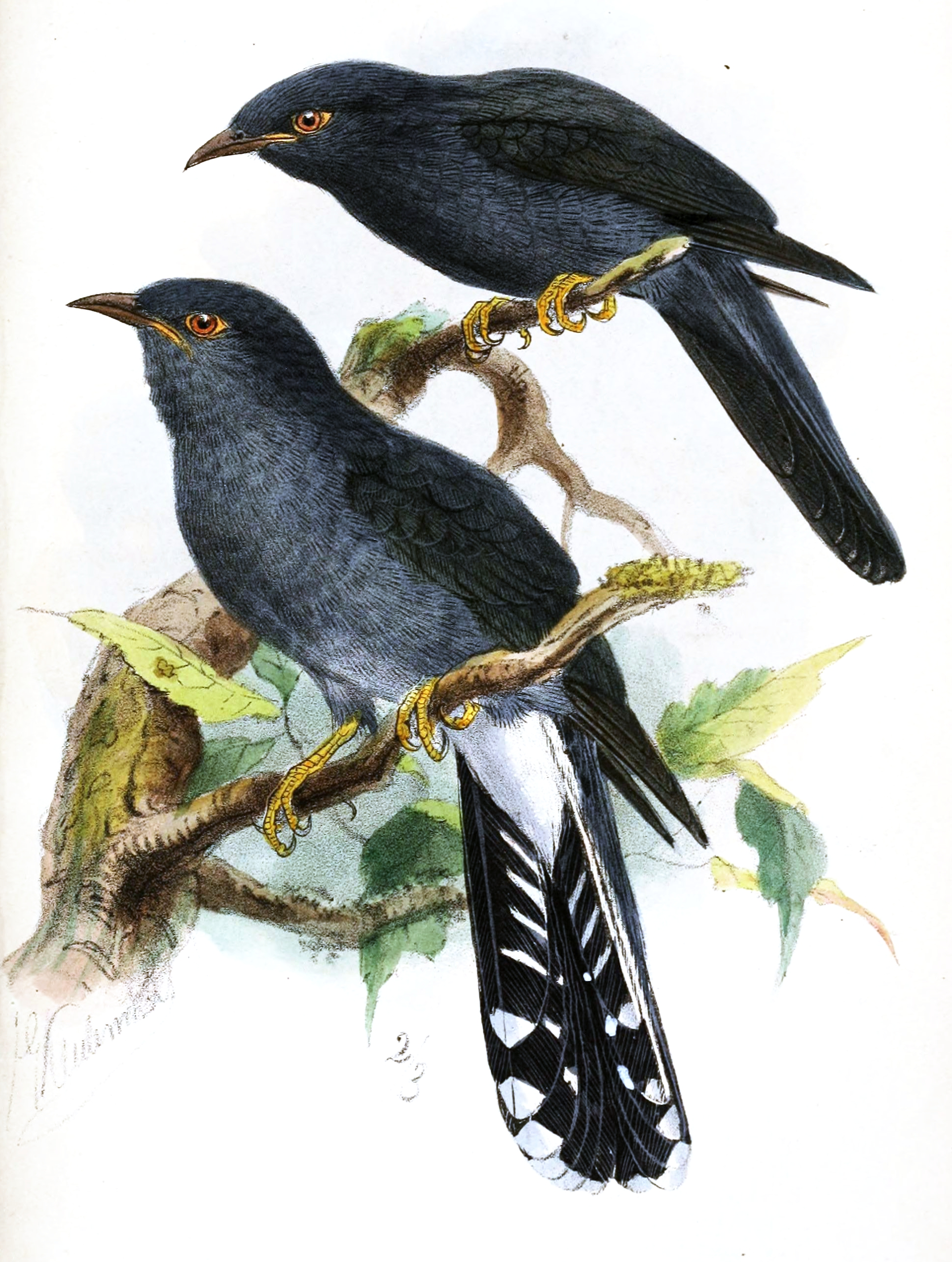
Illustration by John Gerrard Keulemans, 1872.
