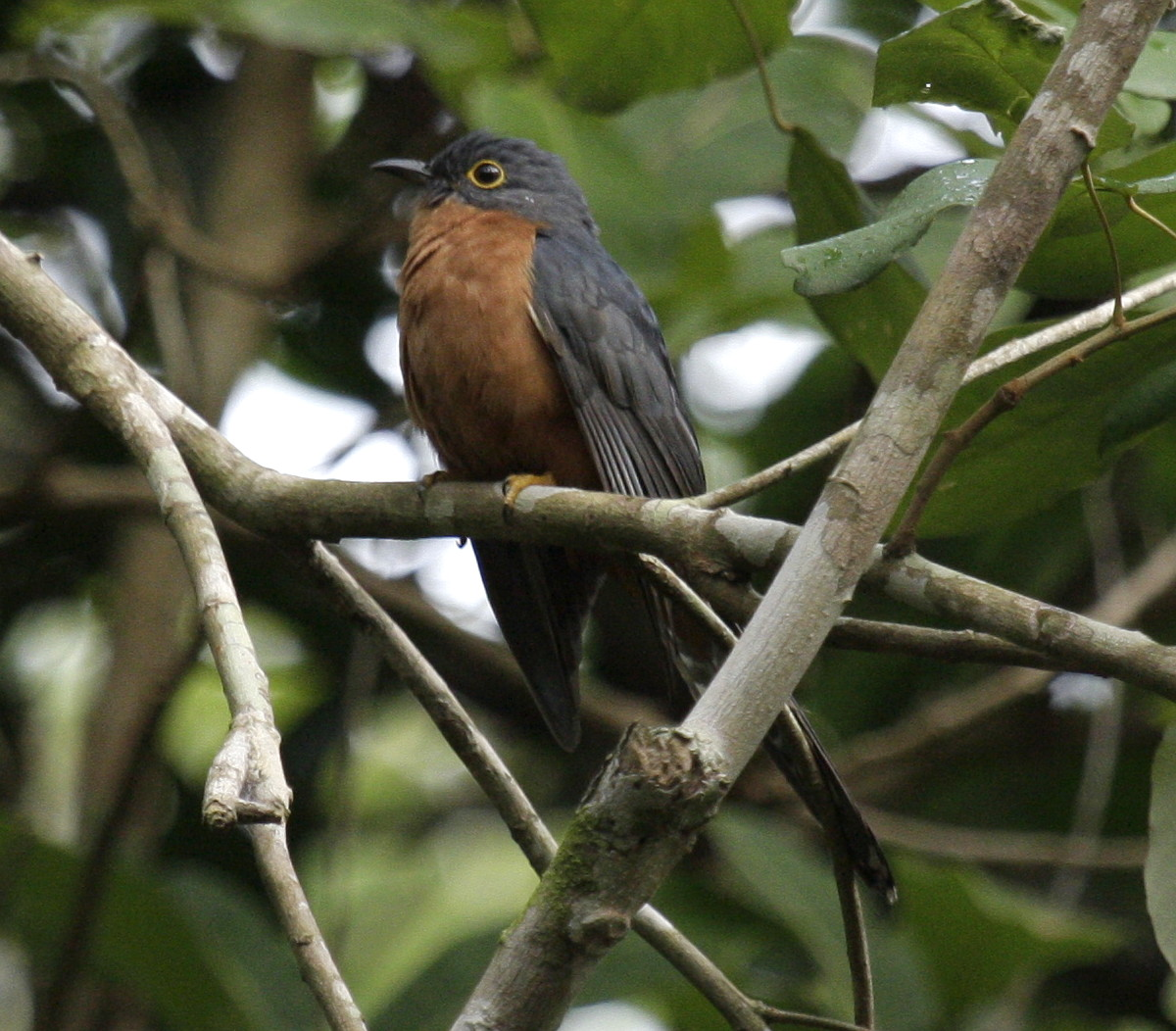

Conservation status
- Least Concern (IUCN 3.1)

Scientific classification
- Kingdom: Animalia
- Phylum: Chordata
- Class: Aves
- Order: Cuculiformes
- Family: Cuculidae
- Genus: Cacomantis
- Species: C. castaneiventris

Binomial name
- Cacomantis castaneiventris (Gould, 1867)

= Chestnut-breasted cuckoo =

Species of bird

The chestnut-breasted cuckoo (Cacomantis castaneiventris) is a species of cuckoo in the family Cuculidae. It is found in Australia, Indonesia, and Papua New Guinea. Its natural habitats are subtropical or tropical dry forests and subtropical or tropical mangrove forests.

== Taxonomy ==
Three subspecies are currently recognised:

- Cacomantis castaneiventris arfakianus (Salvadori, 1889) – Parts of western New Guinea.
- Cacomantis castaneiventris weiskei (Reichenow, 1900) – Eastern New Guinea.
- Cacomantis castaneiventris castaneiventris (Gould, 1867) – Aru Islands in Indonesia and the Cape York Peninsula in Australia.

== Description ==
The chestnut-breasted cuckoo is about 22–25 centimetres (8.7–9.8 in) long. Adults have a dark slaty grey-blue head, back and wings, deep rufous breast and underparts and barred black and white tail. Immatures are dull greyish cinnamon on the head and wings, grading to dull mid brown on the outer parts of the wings, and pale buff or cinnamon on the breast and underparts. The tail is barred mid brown and white. Both adults and immatures have a yellow orbital eye ring.

The chestnut-breasted cuckoo is slightly smaller than the similar Sahul brush cuckoo (Cacomantis variolosus) and fan-tailed cuckoo (Cacomantis flabelliformis), but the breast and underparts of the adult chestnut-breasted cuckoo is much darker.
