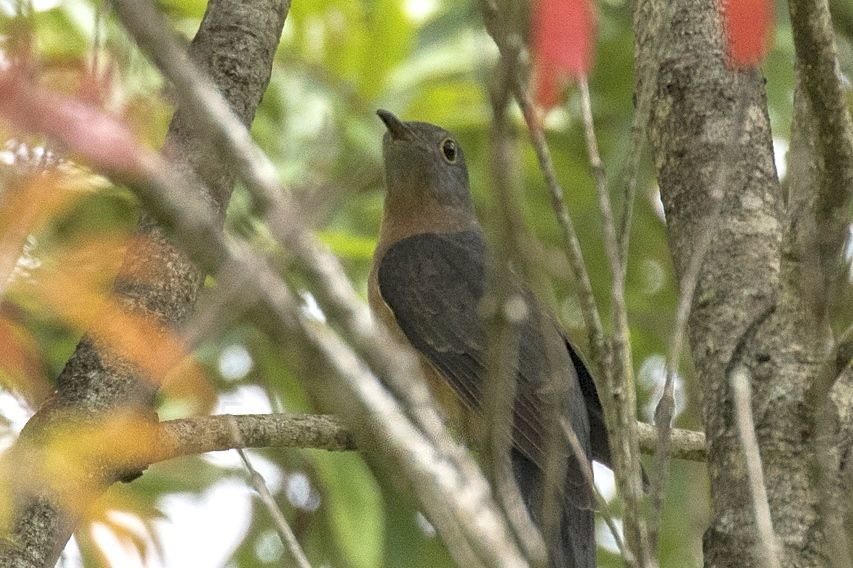

Scientific classification
- Domain: Eukaryota
- Kingdom: Animalia
- Phylum: Chordata
- Class: Aves
- Order: Cuculiformes
- Family: Cuculidae
- Genus: Cacomantis
- Species: C. sepulcralis

Binomial name
- Cacomantis sepulcralis (Müller, S, 1843)

= Sunda brush cuckoo =

Species of bird

The Sunda brush cuckoo (Cacomantis sepulcralis) is a species of cuckoo in the family Cuculidae. It is found in Indonesia, Malaysia, the Philippines, Singapore, and Thailand. Its natural habitat is subtropical or tropical moist lowland forests. It was formerly treated as conspecific with the Sulawesi brush cuckoo with the English name "rusty-breasted cuckoo".

== Taxonomy ==
The Sunda brush cuckoo was formally described in 1843 by the German naturalist Salomon Müller under the binomial name Cuculus sepulcralis. It is now placed in the genus Cacomantis that Müller had introduced in the same article as he had described the species. The genus name is from the Ancient Greek κακομαντις (kakomantis) meaning "prophet of evil". The specific epithet sepulcralis is Latin meaning "sepulchral" or "of the tomb".

Two subspecies are recognised:

- C. s. sepulcralis (Müller, S, 1843) – Malay Peninsula, Greater Sunda Islands (Borneo, Java, Sulawesi, Sumatra) and Lesser Sunda Islands east to Alor Island
- C. s. everetti Hartert, EJO, 1925 – Basilan and Sulu Archipelago (southwest Philippines)

The Sulawesi brush cuckoo (Cacomantis virescens) was formerly considered as an additional subspecies. The combined taxa were known by the English name "rusty-breasted cuckoo".
