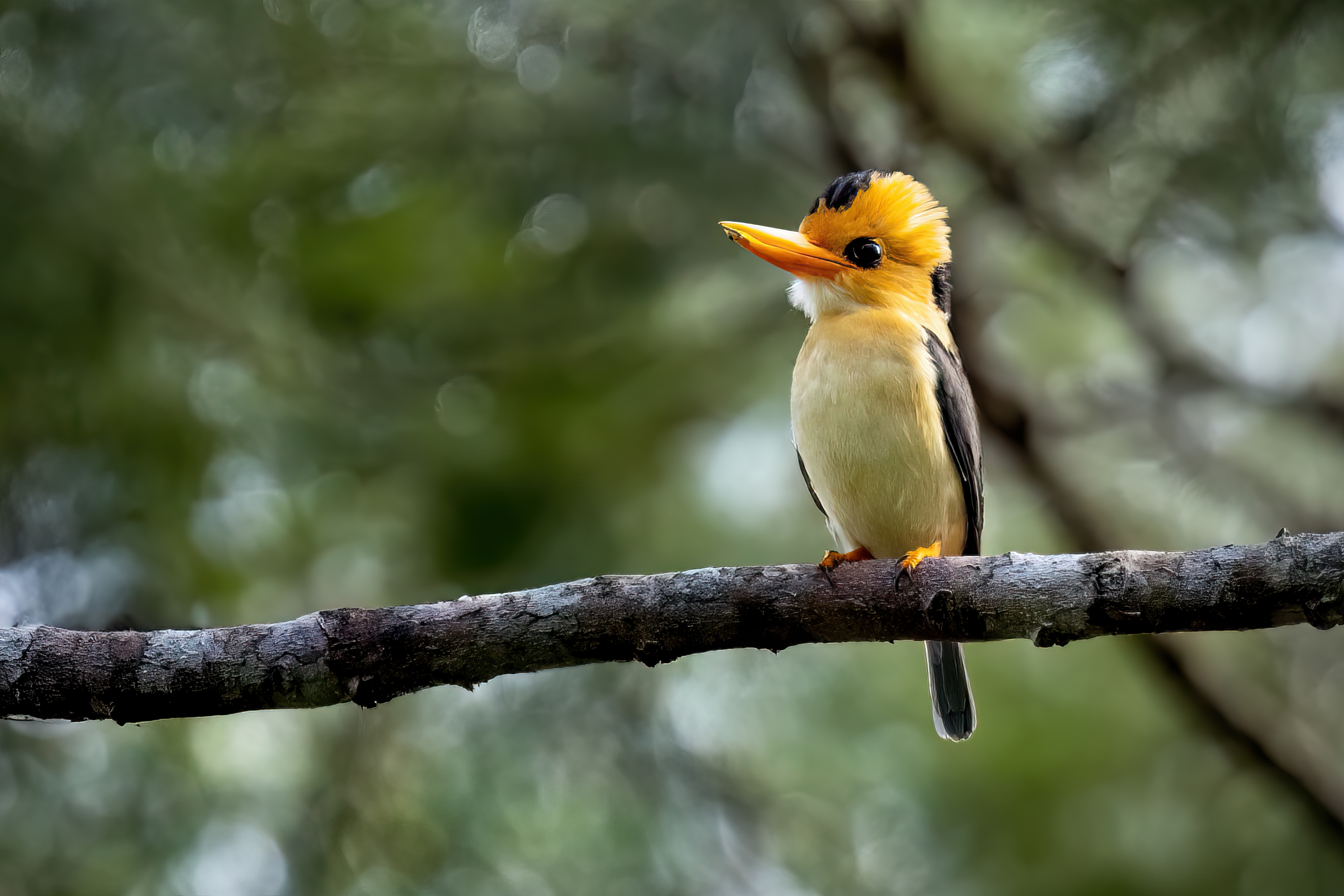

Conservation status
- Least Concern (IUCN 3.1)

Scientific classification
- Kingdom: Animalia
- Phylum: Chordata
- Class: Aves
- Order: Coraciiformes
- Family: Alcedinidae
- Subfamily: Halcyoninae
- Genus: Syma
- Species: S. torotoro

Binomial name
- Syma torotoro Lesson, 1827

Synonyms
- Halcyon torotoro

= Yellow-billed kingfisher =

Species of bird

The yellow-billed kingfisher (Syma torotoro) is a medium-sized tree kingfisher.

== Taxonomy ==
Three subspecies are recognised:

- Syma torotoro torotoro (Lesson, 1827) found in West Papuan islands, lowland New Guinea, Yapen Island and Aru
- S. t. flavirostris (Gould, 1850) found in Cape York Peninsula in northeastern Australia

== Description ==
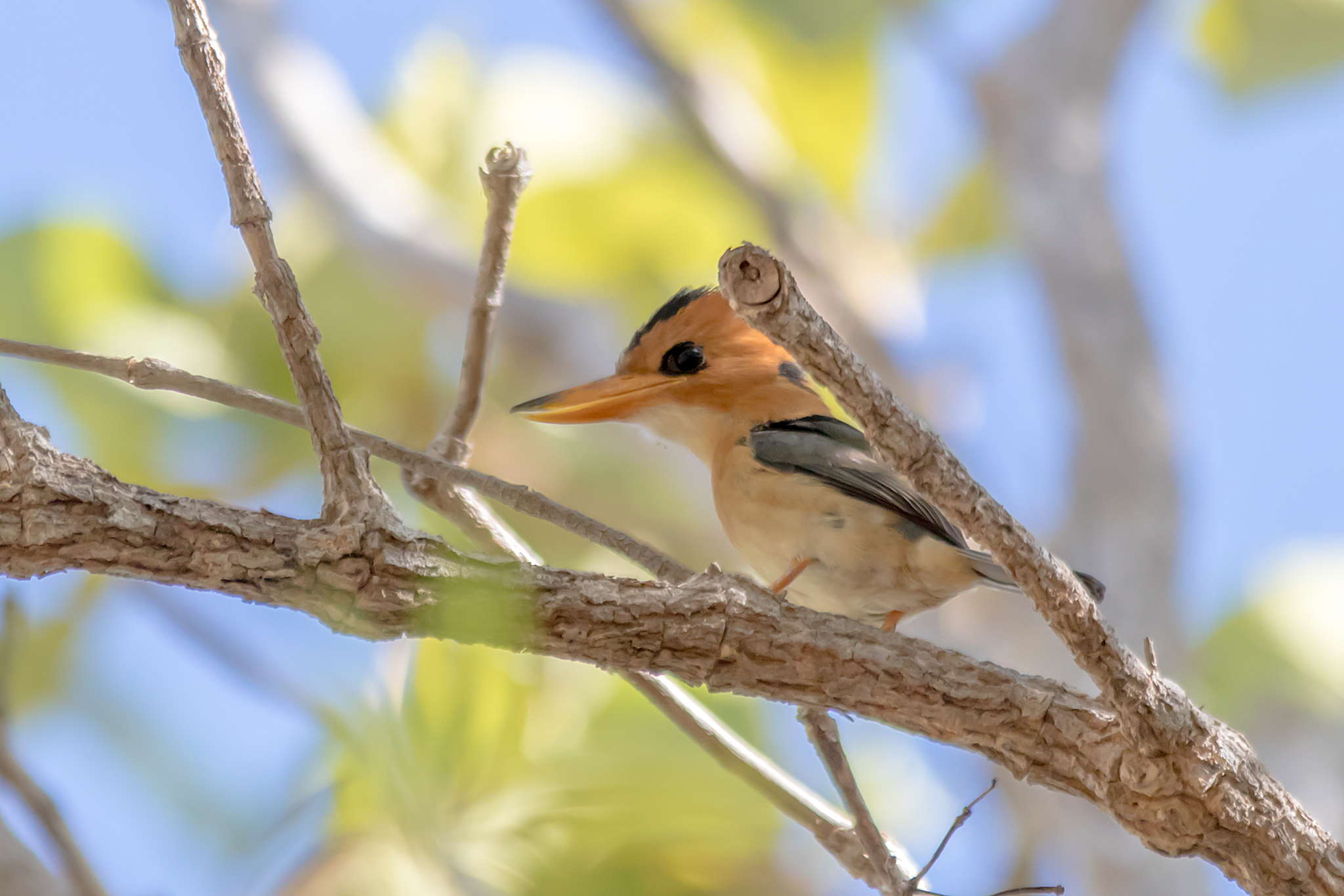
In Weipa, Australia

The yellow-billed kingfisher is 20 cm (7.9 in) long, with a wingspan of 29 cm (11 in), and it weighs 30–50 g (1.1–1.8 oz). Its orange colouring and yellow bill are distinctive; it has an orange head and neck with a black nape patch and white throat. Adult females also have a black crown patch. The upper mantle is blackish grading to olive green on the back, blue-green on rump and with a blue tail. The upperwing is dull green-blue with dark olive-black flight feathers. The underparts are pale orange-grey. The bill is orange-yellow in adults, dark grey in juveniles.

== Distribution and habitat ==
The yellow-billed kingfisher is widespread throughout lowland New Guinea and the adjacent islands, extending to northern Cape York Peninsula in Australia. It may be found in rainforest, monsoon forest and along forest edges.

== Behaviour ==
=== Feeding ===
The yellow-billed kingfisher is known to prey on large insects, earthworms, and small snakes and lizards. It perches in the low canopy, swaying from side to side, before swooping down to the ground to take its prey.

=== Breeding ===
The nest of the yellow-billed kingfisher is usually an excavated chamber in an arboreal termite nest. The female lays a clutch of 3 or 4 glossy white, rounded eggs, measuring 26 mm × 23 mm (1.0 in × 0.9 in).

=== Voice ===
Calls include loud, repeated whistling trills like a postman's whistle, mainly during the breeding season.

== Conservation status ==
With a large range and no evidence of significant decline, the conservation status of this species is assessed as being of Least Concern.
