= List of birds of Goiás =

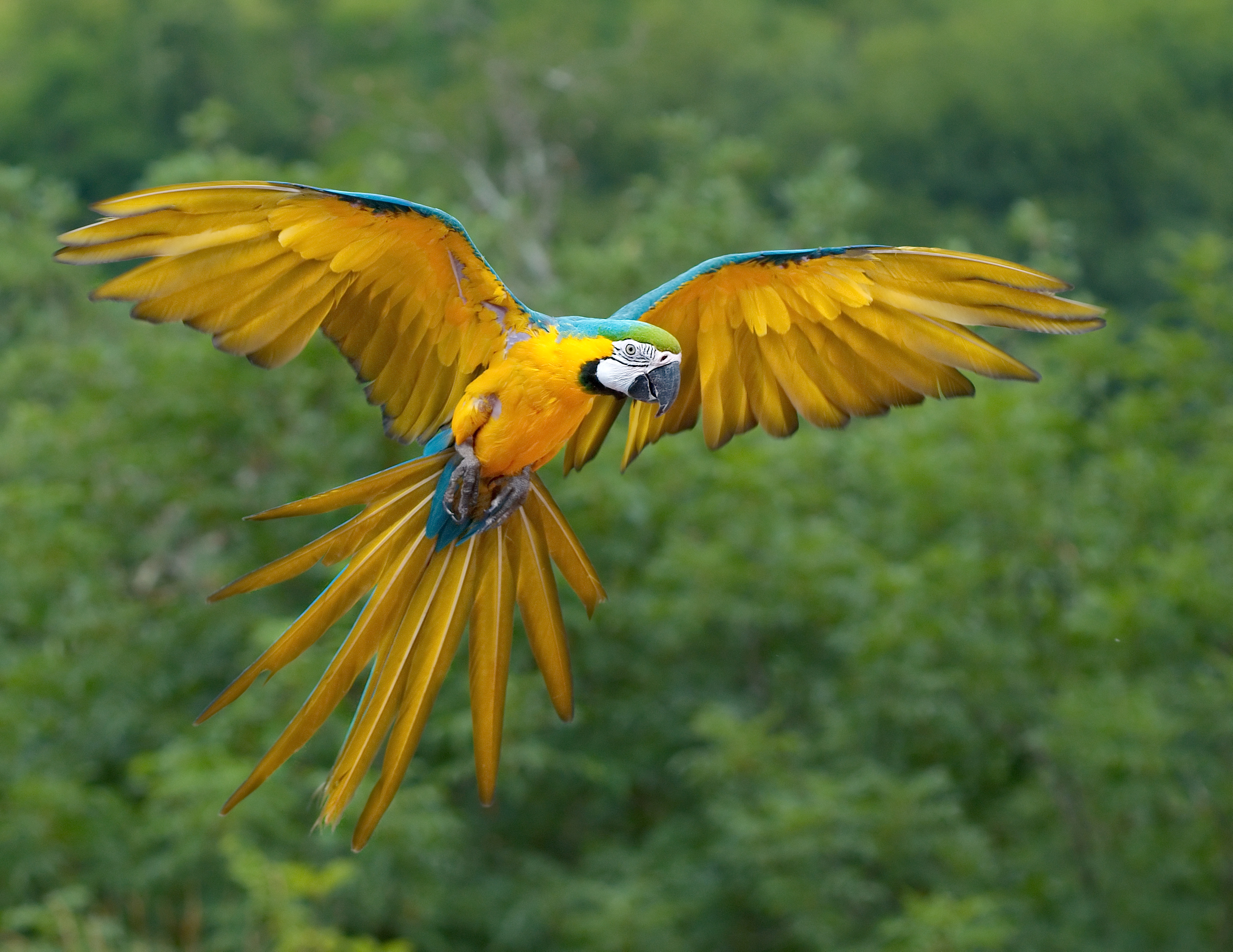
Blue-and-yellow macaw

This list of birds of Goiás includes species documented in the Brazilian state of Goiás. Avibase provides the foundation for this list, and all additions that differ from this list have citations. As of September 2024, there are 702 recorded bird species in Goiás.

The following tags note species in each of those categories:

- (A) Accidental - species not regularly occurring in Goiás
- (EB) Endemic to Brazil - species that is only found in Brazil
- (Ex) Extirpated - species that is locally extinct
- (I) Introduced - species that is not native to Goiás

== Rheas ==
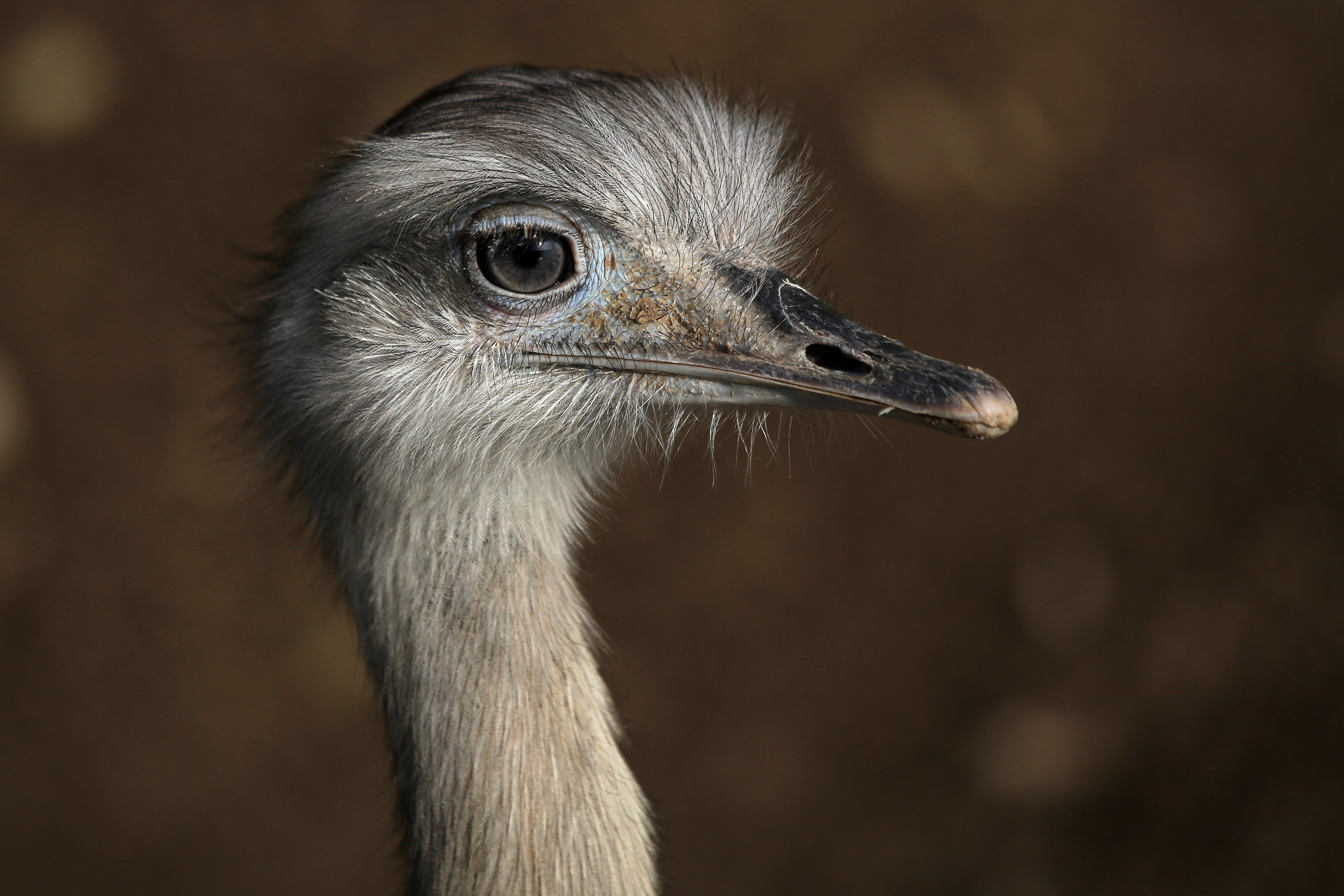
Greater rhea

Order: Rheiformes Family: Rheidae

- Greater rhea (Rhea americana)

== Tinamous ==
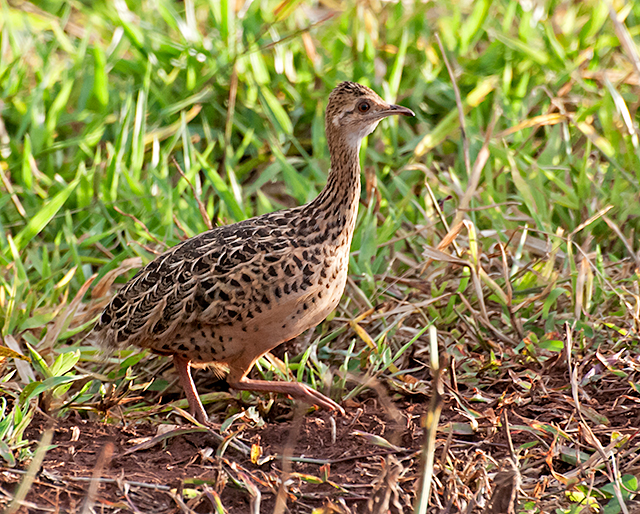
Spotted nothura

Order: Tinamiformes Family: Tinamidae

- Solitary tinamou (Tinamus solitarius) (A)
- Little tinamou (Crypturellus soui)
- Undulated tinamou (Crypturellus undulatus)
- Small-billed tinamou (Crypturellus parvirostris)
- Tataupa tinamou (Crypturellus tataupa)
- Red-winged tinamou (Rhynchotus rufescens)
- Lesser nothura (Nothura minor) (EB)
- Spotted nothura (Nothura maculosa)
- Dwarf tinamou (Taoniscus nanus) (EB)

== Screamers ==
Order: Anseriformes Family: Anhimidae

- Horned screamer (Anhima cornuta)
- Southern screamer (Chauna torquata) (A)

== Ducks, geese, and waterfowl ==
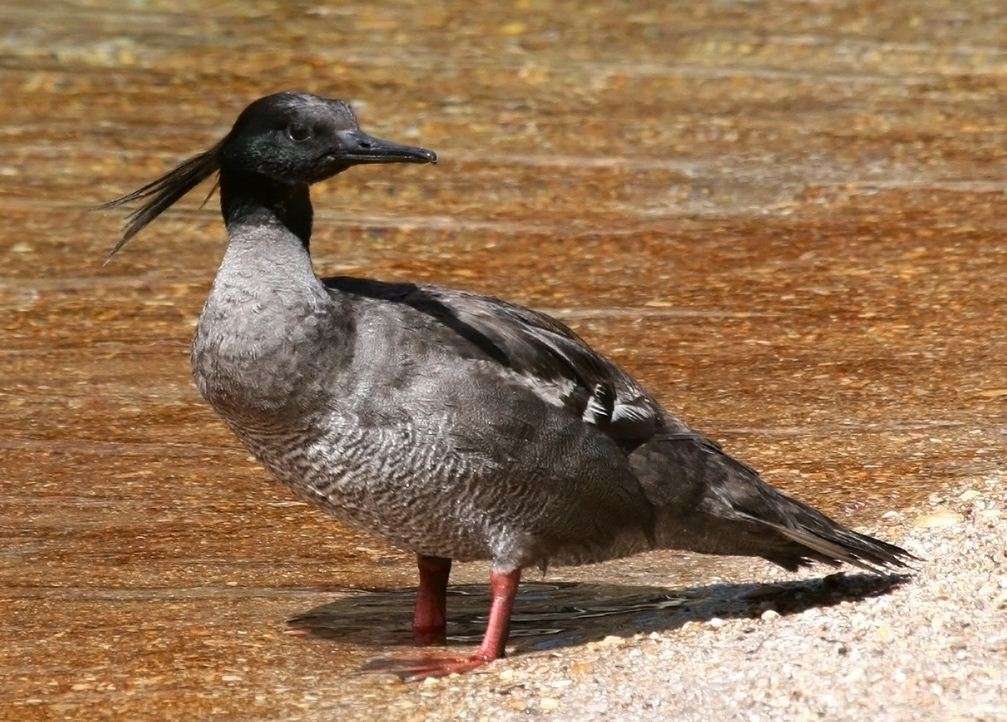
Brazilian merganser

Order: Anseriformes Family: Anatidae

- White-faced whistling duck (Dendrocygna viduata)
- Black-bellied whistling duck (Dendrocygna autumnalis)
- Fulvous whistling duck (Dendrocygna bicolor)
- Masked duck (Nomonyx dominicus)
- Brazilian merganser (Mergus octosetaceus)
- Orinoco goose (Neochen jubata)
- Southern pochard (Netta erythrophthalma)
- Brazilian teal (Amazonetta brasiliensis)
- White-cheeked pintail (Anas bahamensis)
- Comb duck (Sarkidiornis melanotos)
- Muscovy duck (Cairina moschata)

== Chachalacas, guans, and curassows ==
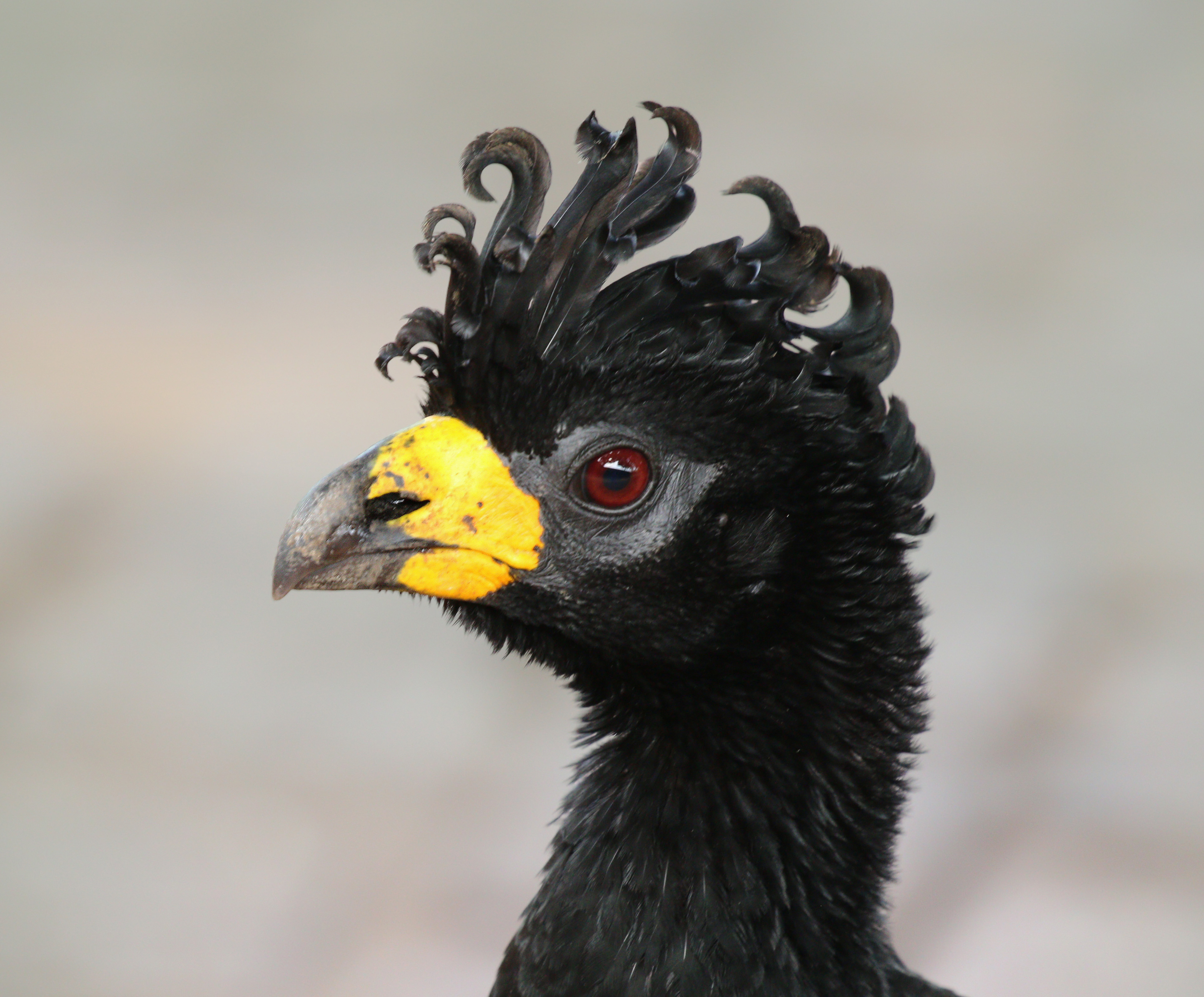
Bare-faced curassow

Order: Galliformes Family: Cracidae

- Rusty-margined guan (Penelope superciliaris)
- Chestnut-bellied guan (Penelope ochrogaster) (EB)
- Bare-faced curassow (Crax fasciolata)
- Razor-billed curassow (Mitu tuberosum)

== New World quail ==
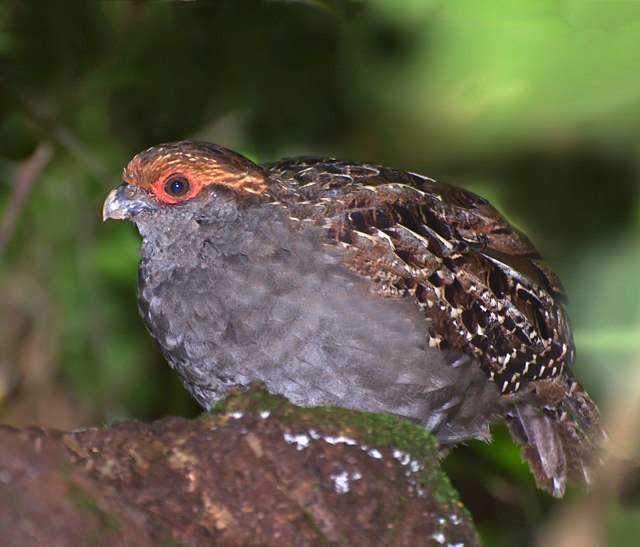
Spot-winged wood quail

Order: Galliformes Family: Odontophoridae

- Spot-winged wood quail (Odontophorus capueira)

== Grebes ==
Order: Podicipediformes Family: Podicipedidae

- Pied-billed grebe (Podilymbus podiceps)
- Least grebe (Tachybaptus dominicus)

== Doves and pigeons ==
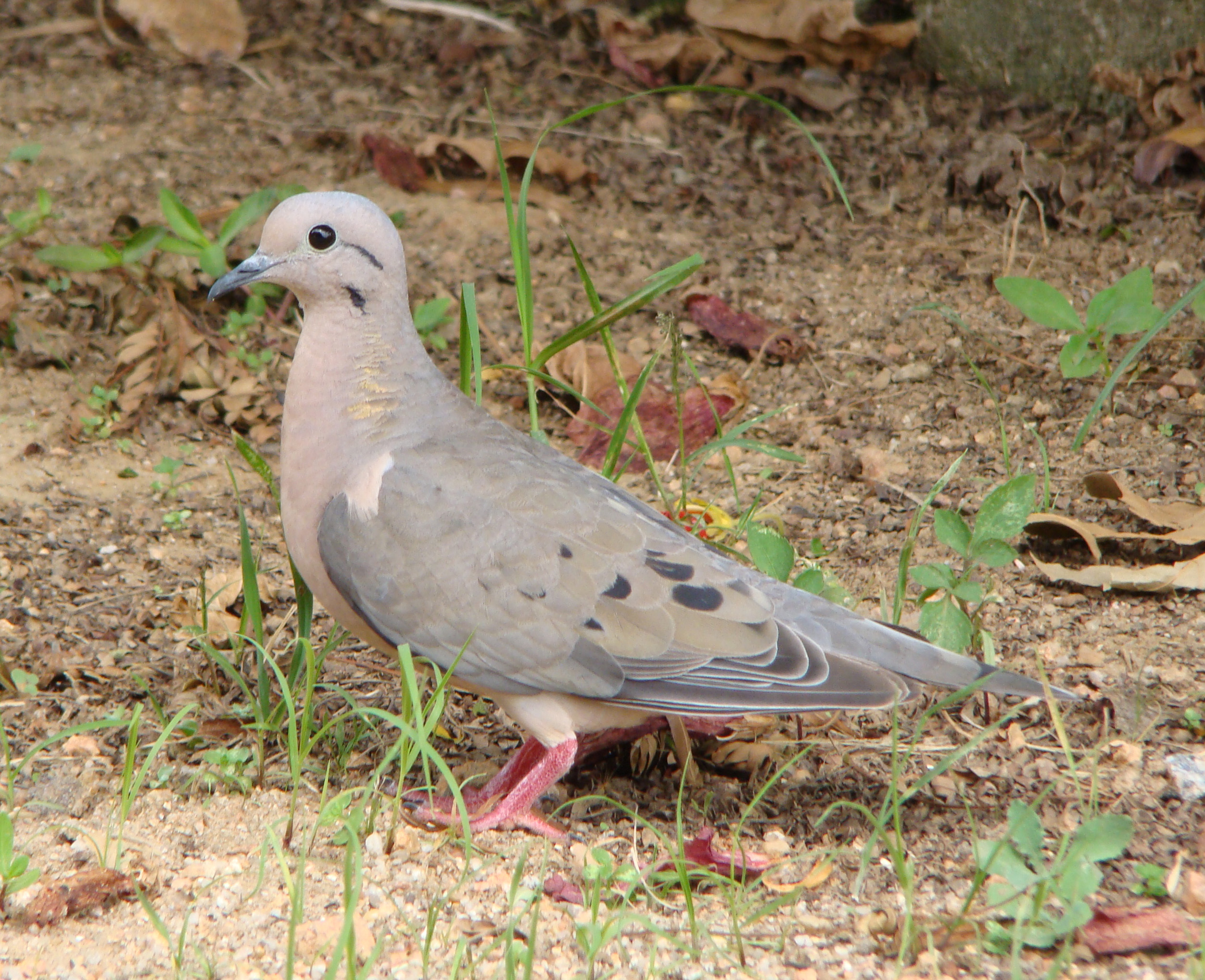
Eared dove

Order: Columbiformes Family: Columbidae

- Rock pigeon (Columba livia) (I)
- Scaled pigeon (Patagioenas speciosa)
- Picazuro pigeon (Patagioenas picazuro)
- Pale-vented pigeon (Patagioenas cayennensis)
- Plumbeous pigeon (Patagioenas plumbea)
- White-tipped dove (Leptotila verreauxi)
- Grey-fronted dove (Leptotila rufaxilla)
- Ruddy quail-dove (Geotrygon montana)
- Eared dove (Zenaida auriculata)
- Scaled dove (Columbina squammata)
- Plain-breasted ground dove (Columbina minuta)
- Ruddy ground dove (Columbina talpacoti)
- Picui ground dove (Columbina picui)
- Blue-eyed ground dove (Columbina cyanopis) (Ex)
- Blue ground dove (Claravis pretiosa)
- Long-tailed ground dove (Uropelia campestris)

== Sunbitterns ==
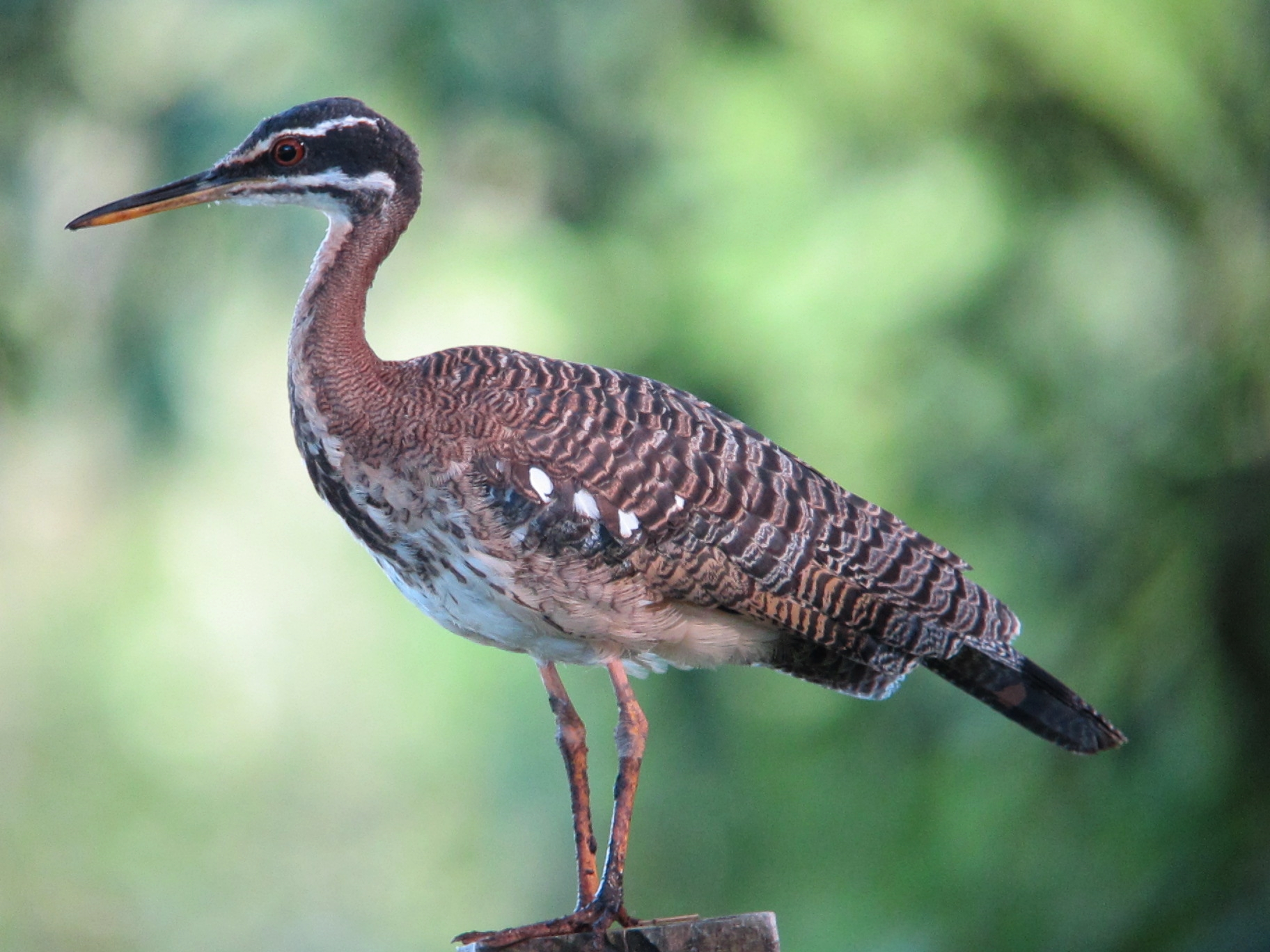
Sunbittern

Order: Eurypygiformes Family: Eurypygidae

- Sunbittern (Eurypyga helias)

== Potoos ==
Order: Nyctibiiformes Family: Nyctibiidae

- Great potoo (Nyctibius grandis)
- Common potoo (Nyctibius griseus)

== Nightjars ==
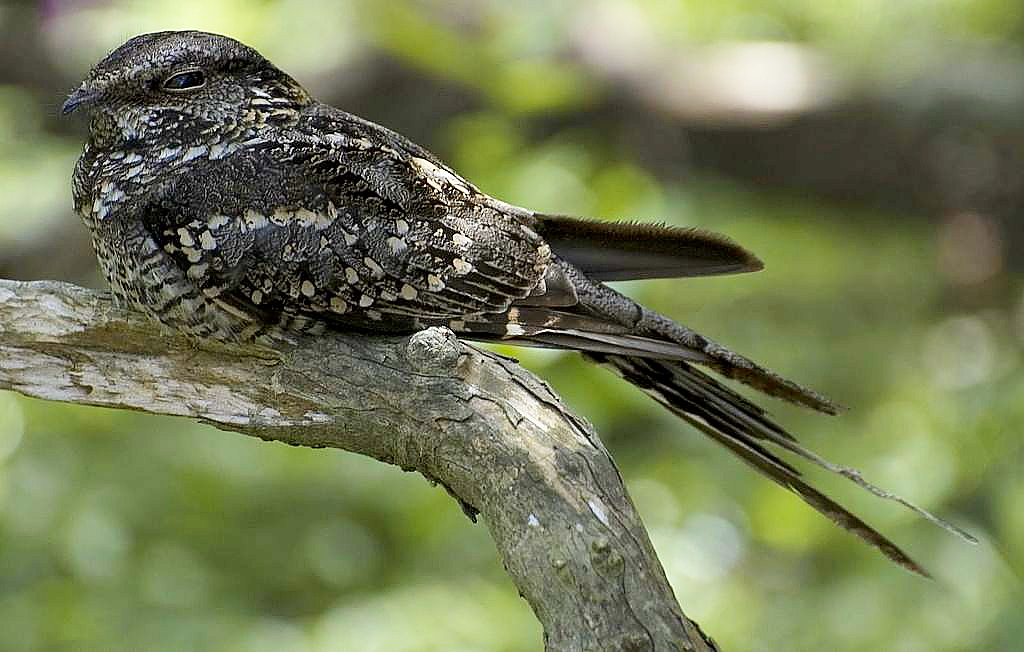
Scissor-tailed nightjar

Order: Caprimulgiformes Family: Caprimulgidae

- Nacunda nighthawk (Chordeiles nacunda)
- Least nighthawk (Chordeiles pusillus)
- Lesser nighthawk (Chordeiles acutipennis)
- Short-tailed nighthawk (Lurocalis semitorquatus)
- Band-tailed nighthawk (Nyctiprogne leucopyga)
- Common pauraque (Nyctidromus albicollis)
- Scissor-tailed nightjar (Hydropsalis torquata)
- Spot-tailed nightjar (Hydropsalis maculicaudus)
- Ocellated poorwill (Nyctiphrynus ocellatus)
- Rufous nightjar (Antrostomus rufus)
- Common nighthawk (Chordeiles minor)
- White-winged nightjar (Hydropsalis candicans)

== Swifts ==
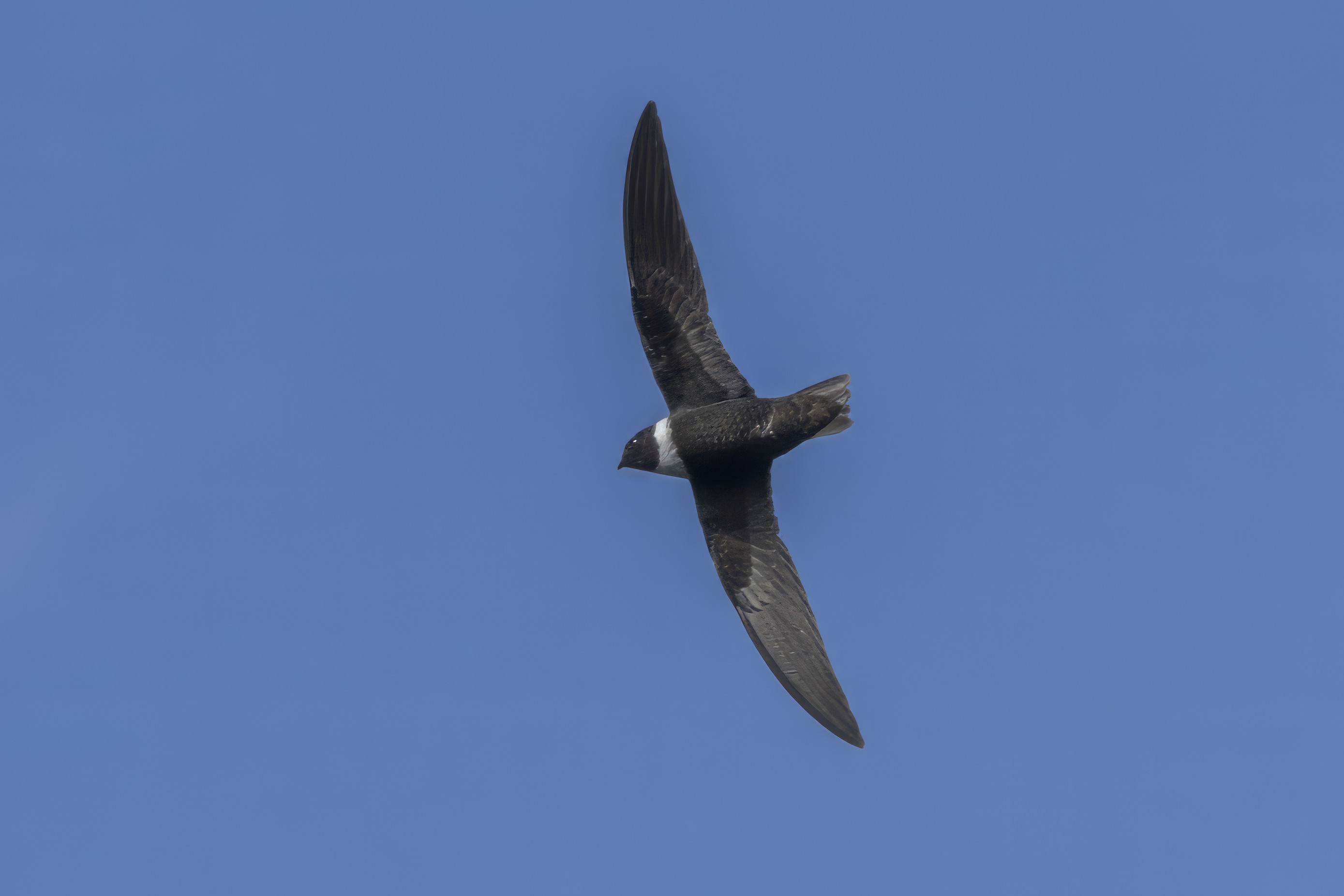
White-collared swift

Order: Apodiformes Family: Apodidae

- Sooty swift (Cypseloides fumigatus)
- Great dusky swift (Cypseloides senex)
- White-collared swift (Streptoprocne zonaris)
- Biscutate swift (Streptoprocne biscutata)
- Sick's swift (Chaetura meridionalis)
- Short-tailed swift (Chaetura brachyura)
- Fork-tailed palm swift (Tachornis squamata)
- Pale-rumped swift (Chaetura egregia) (A)

== Hummingbirds ==
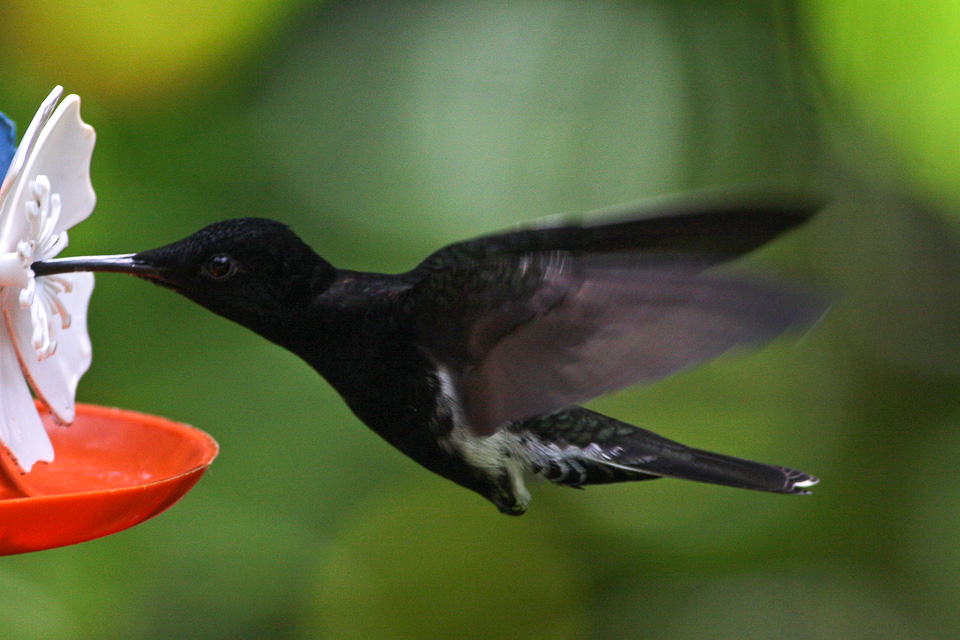
Black jacobin

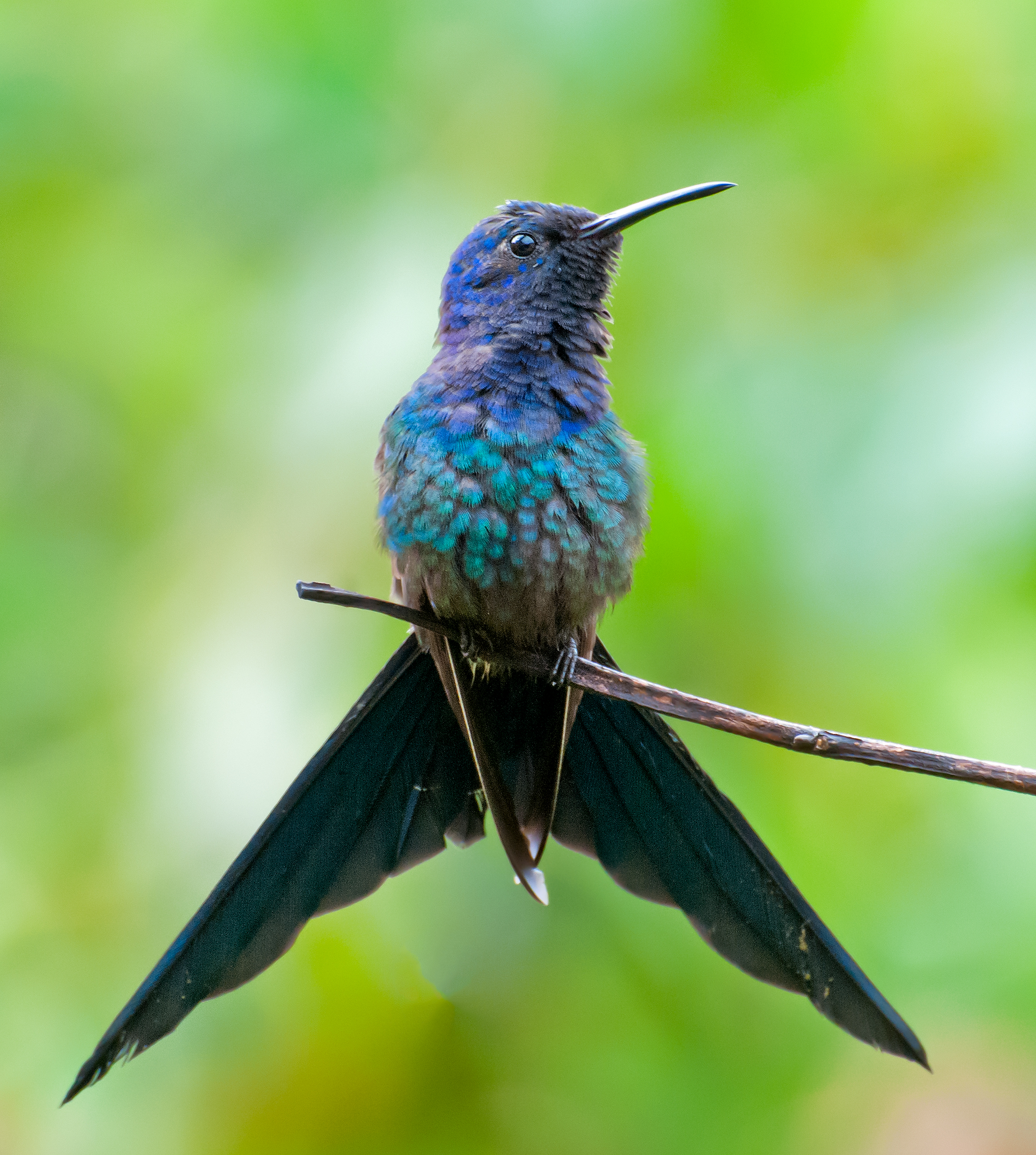
Swallow-tailed hummingbird

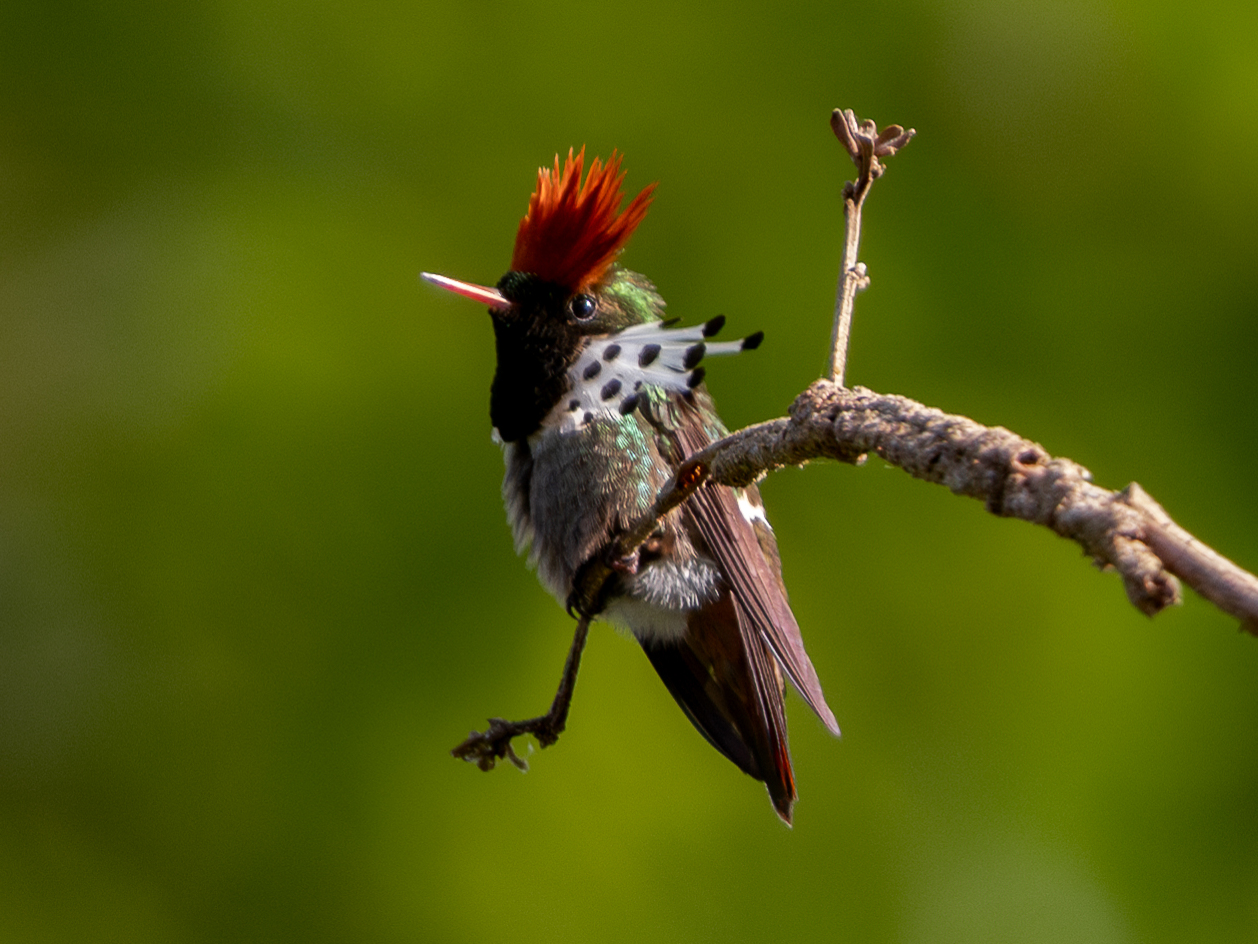
Dot-eared coquette

Order: Apodiformes Family: Trochilidae

- Black jacobin (Florisuga fusca)
- Rufous-breasted hermit (Glaucis hirsutus)
- Reddish hermit (Phaethornis ruber)
- Planalto hermit (Phaethornis pretrei)
- White-vented violetear (Colibri serrirostris)
- Horned sungem (Heliactin bilophus)
- Black-eared fairy (Heliothryx auritus)
- White-tailed goldenthroat (Polytmus guainumbi)
- Ruby-topaz hummingbird (Chrysolampis mosquitus)
- Black-throated mango (Anthracothorax nigricollis)
- Dot-eared coquette (Lophornis gouldii) (EB)
- Frilled coquette (Lophornis magnificus) (EB)
- Glittering-bellied emerald (Chlorostilbon lucidus)
- Blue-chinned sapphire (Chlorestes notata)
- Sombre hummingbird (Aphantochroa cirrochloris)
- Swallow-tailed hummingbird (Eupetomena macroura)
- Fork-tailed woodnymph (Thalurania furcata)
- Versicolored emerald (Amazilia versicolor)
- Glittering-throated emerald (Amazilia fimbriata)
- Sapphire-spangled emerald (Amazilia lactea)
- White-chinned sapphire (Hylocharis cyanus)
- Gilded hummingbird (Hylocharis chrysura)
- Long-billed starthroat (Heliomaster longirostris)
- Stripe-breasted starthroat (Heliomaster squamosus)
- Outcrop sabrewing (Campylopterus calcirupicola) (EB)
- Blue-tufted starthroat (Heliomaster furcifer)
- Amethyst woodstar (Calliphlox amethystina)

== Hoatzins ==
Order: Opisthocomiformes Family: Opisthocomidae

- Hoatzin (Opisthocomus hoazin)

== Cuckoos ==
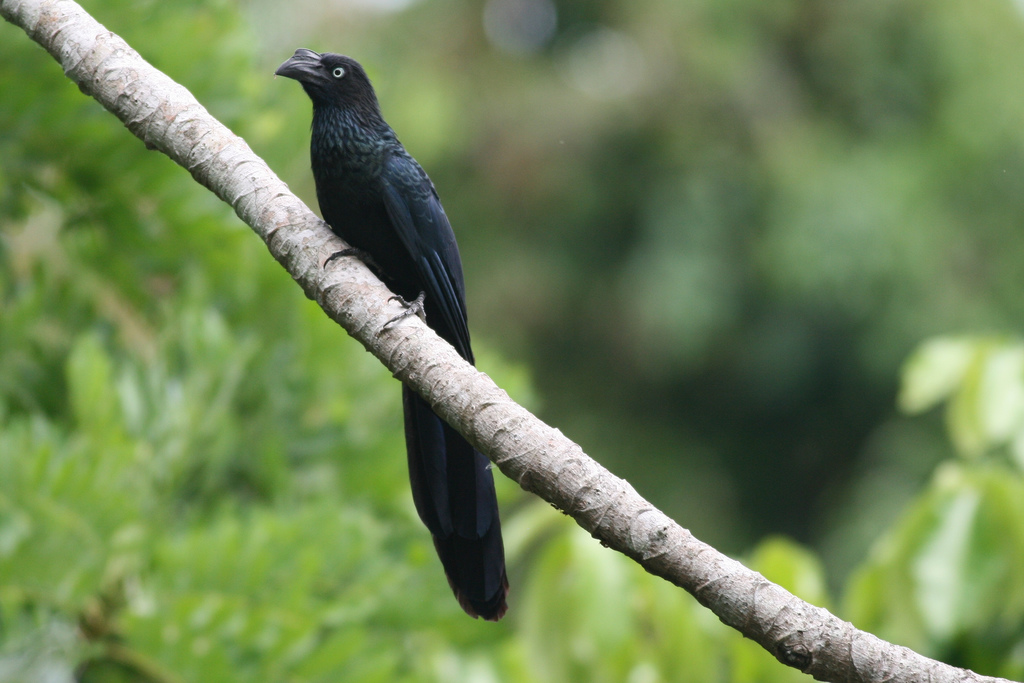
Greater ani

Order: Cuculiformes Family: Cuculidae

- Greater ani (Crotophaga major)
- Smooth-billed ani (Crotophaga ani)
- Guira cuckoo (Guira guira)
- Striped cuckoo (Tapera naevia)
- Pheasant cuckoo (Dromococcyx phasianellus)
- Pavonine cuckoo (Dromococcyx pavoninus)
- Little cuckoo (Coccycua minuta)
- Ash-colored cuckoo (Coccycua cinerea)
- Squirrel cuckoo (Piaya cayana)
- Yellow-billed cuckoo (Coccyzus americanus)
- Pearly-breasted cuckoo (Coccyzus euleri)
- Dark-billed cuckoo (Coccyzus melacoryphus)

== Limpkins ==
Order: Gruiformes Family: Aramidae

- Limpkin (Aramus guarauna)

== Rails ==
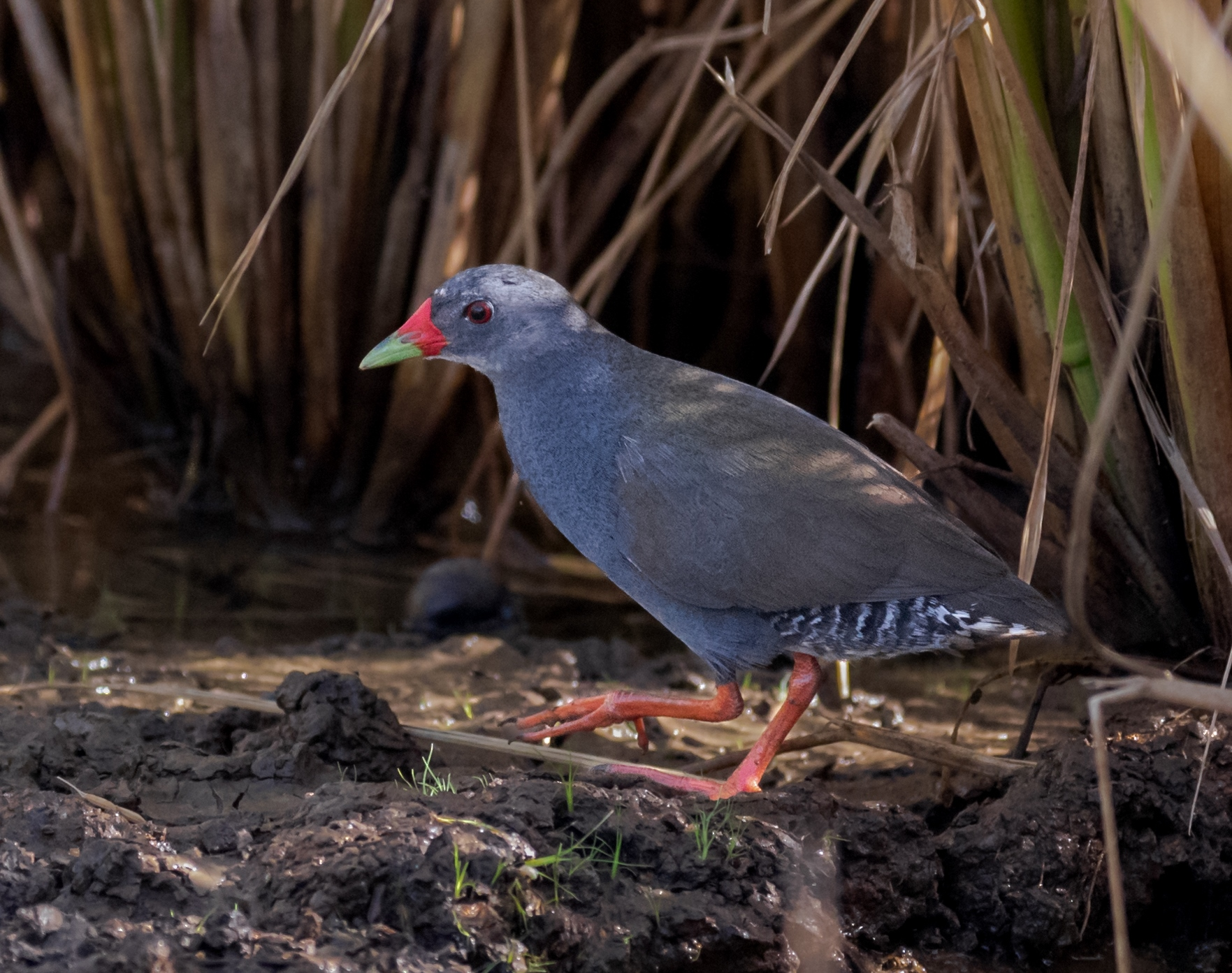
Paint-billed crake

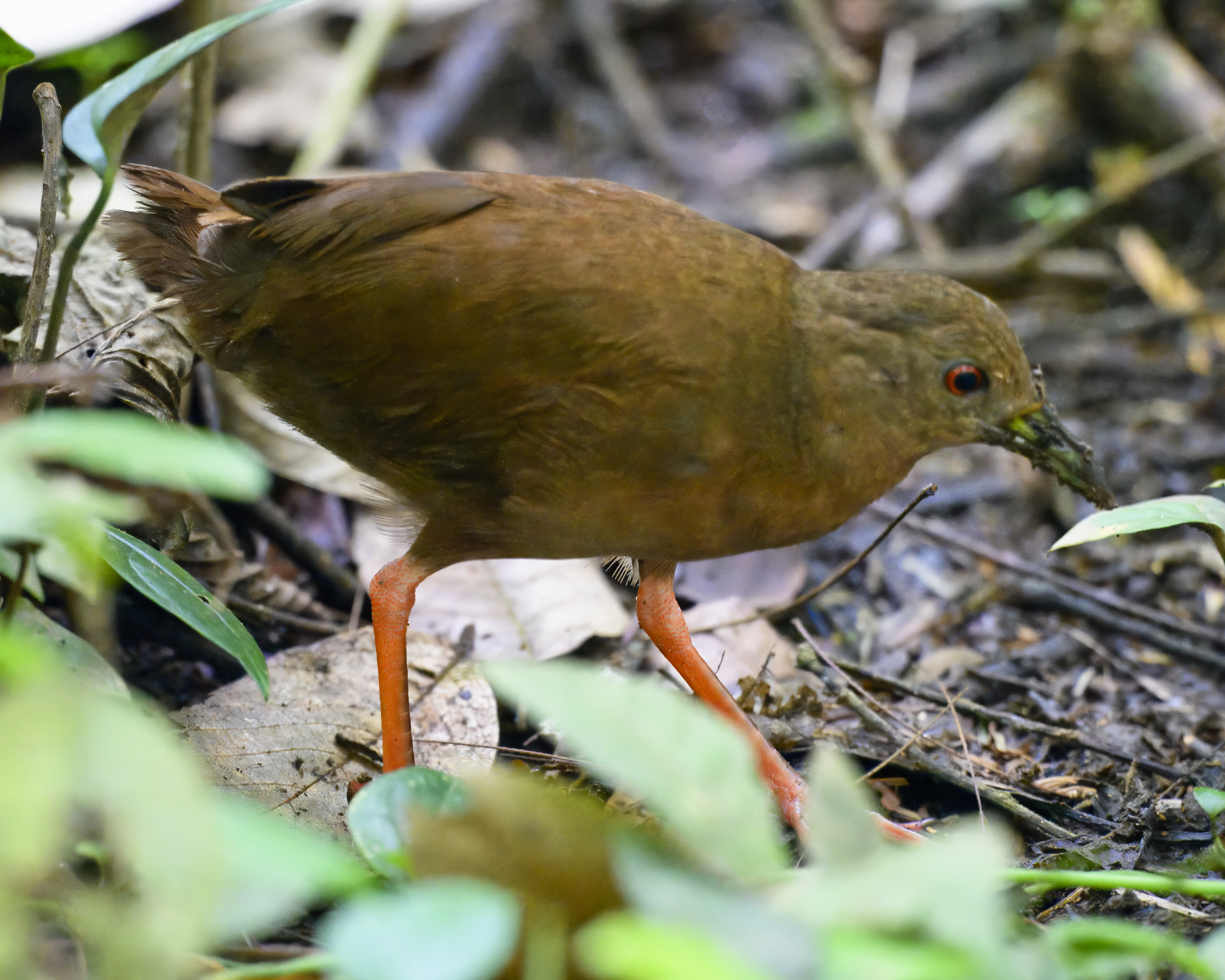
Uniform crake

Order: Gruiformes Family: Rallidae

- Ocellated crake (Micropygia schomburgkii)
- Russet-crowned crake (Rufirallus viridis)
- Rufous-sided crake (Laterallus melanophaius)
- Grey-breasted crake (Laterallus exilis)
- Giant wood rail (Aramides ypecaha)
- Grey-cowled wood rail (Aramides cajaneus)
- Uniform crake (Amaurolimnas concolor)
- Paint-billed crake (Neocrex erythrops)
- Spotted rail (Pardirallus maculatus)
- Blackish rail (Pardirallus nigricans)
- Ash-throated crake (Porzana albicollis)
- Azure gallinule (Porphyrio flavirostris)
- Common gallinule (Gallinula galeata)
- Spot-flanked gallinule (Gallinula melanops)
- White-winged coot (Fulica leucoptera)

== Sungrebes ==
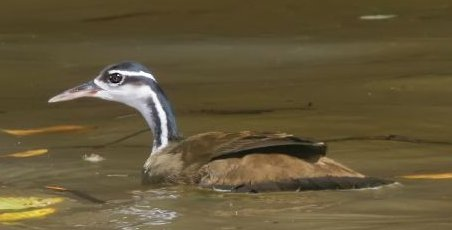
Sungrebe

Order: Gruiformes Family: Heliornithidae

- Sungrebe (Heliornis fulica)

== Trumpeters ==
Order: Gruiformes Family: Psophiidae

- Dark-winged trumpeter (Psophia viridis)

== Storks ==
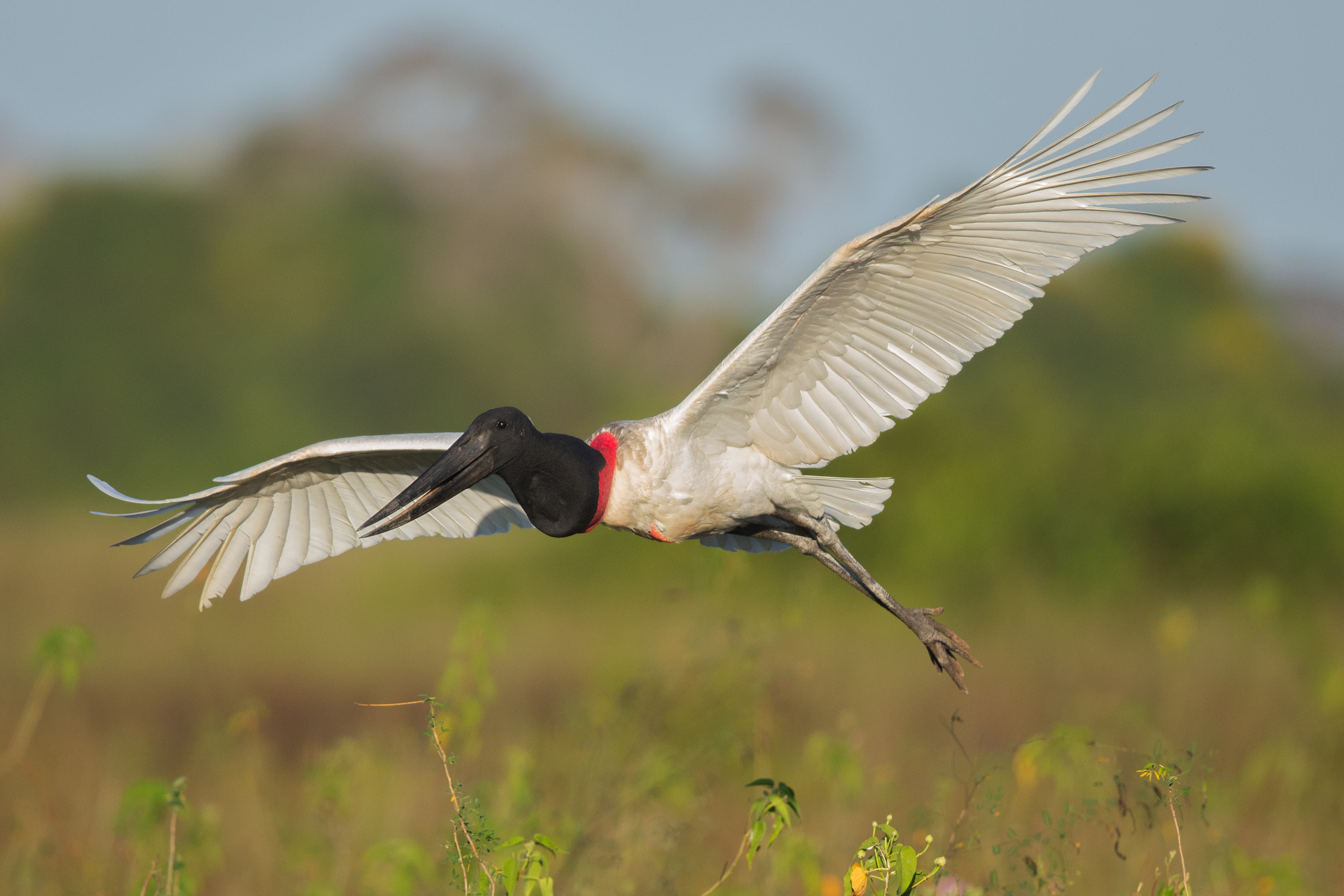
Jabiru

Order: Pelecaniformes Family: Ciconiidae

- Wood stork (Mycteria americana)
- Maguari stork (Ciconia maguari)
- Jabiru (Jabiru mycteria)

== Herons and egrets ==
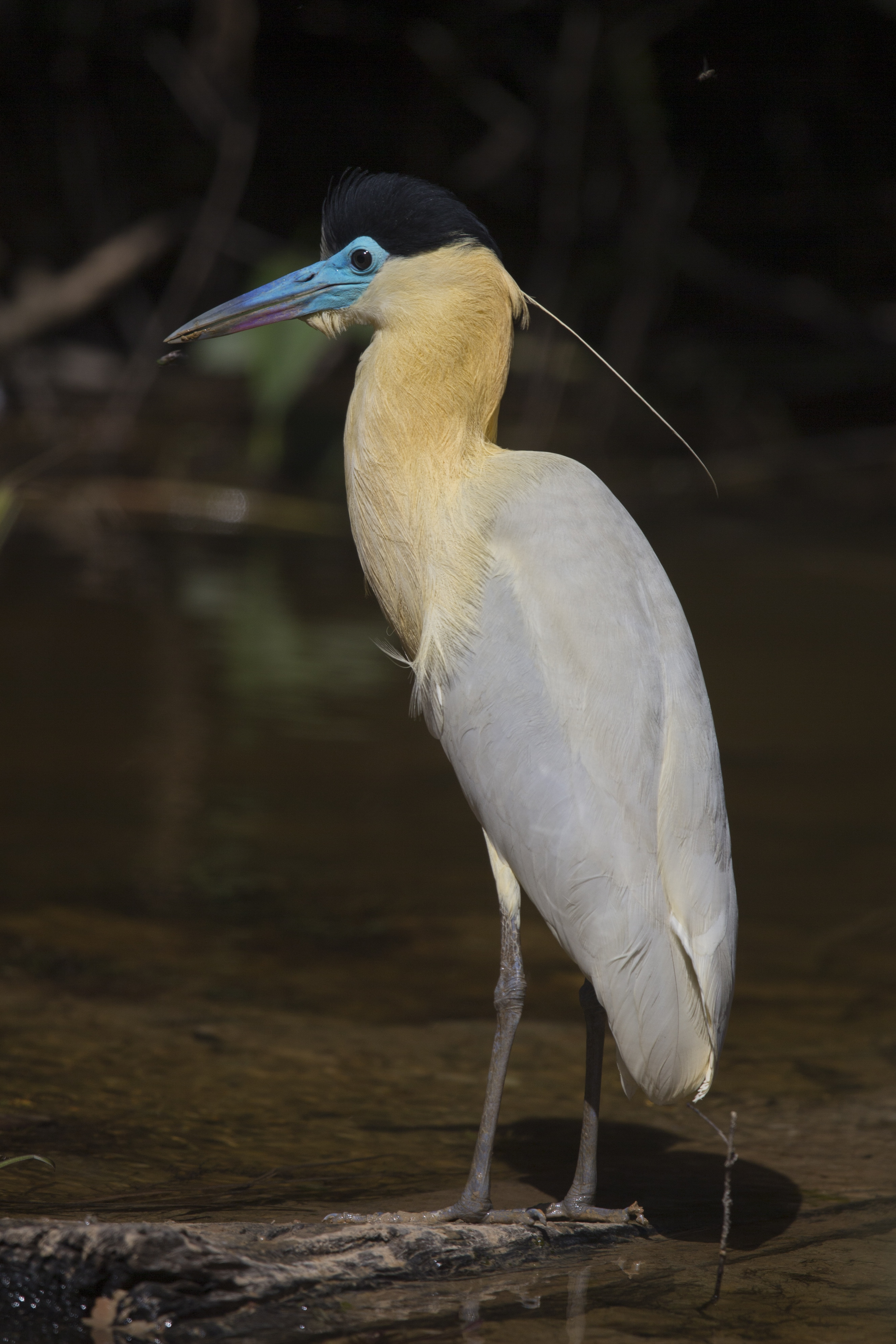
Capped heron

Order: Pelecaniformes Family: Ardeidae

- Rufescent tiger heron (Tigrisoma lineatum)
- Fasciated tiger heron (Tigrisoma fasciatum)
- Agami heron (Agamia agami)
- Boat-billed heron (Cochlearius cochlearius)
- Zigzag heron (Zebrilus undulatus)
- Pinnated bittern (Botaurus pinnatus)
- Stripe-backed bittern (Ixobrychus involucris)
- Least bittern (Ixobrychus exilis)
- Black-crowned night heron (Nycticorax nycticorax)
- Striated heron (Butorides striata)
- Western cattle egret (Bubulcus ibis)
- Cocoi heron (Ardea cocoi)
- Great egret (Ardea alba)
- Whistling heron (Syrigma sibilatrix)
- Capped heron (Pilherodius pileatus)
- Little blue heron (Egretta caerulea)
- Snowy egret (Egretta thula)

== Ibises and spoonbills ==
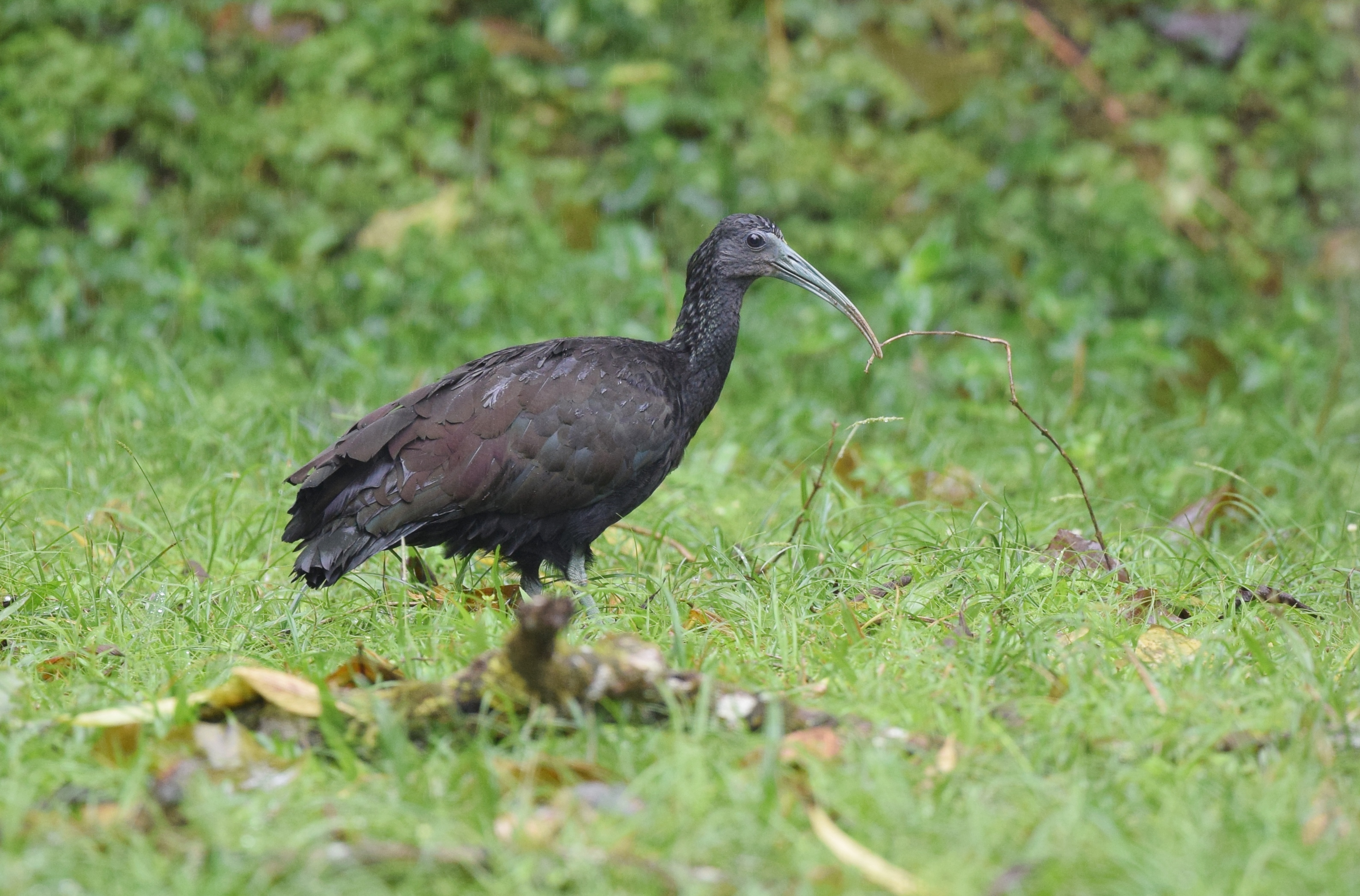
Green ibis

Order: Pelecaniformes Family: Threskiornithidae

- Roseate spoonbill (Platalea ajaja)
- Plumbeous ibis (Theristicus caerulescens)
- Buff-necked ibis (Theristicus caudatus)
- Green ibis (Mesembrinibis cayennensis)
- Bare-faced ibis (Phimosus infuscatus)

== Cormorants ==
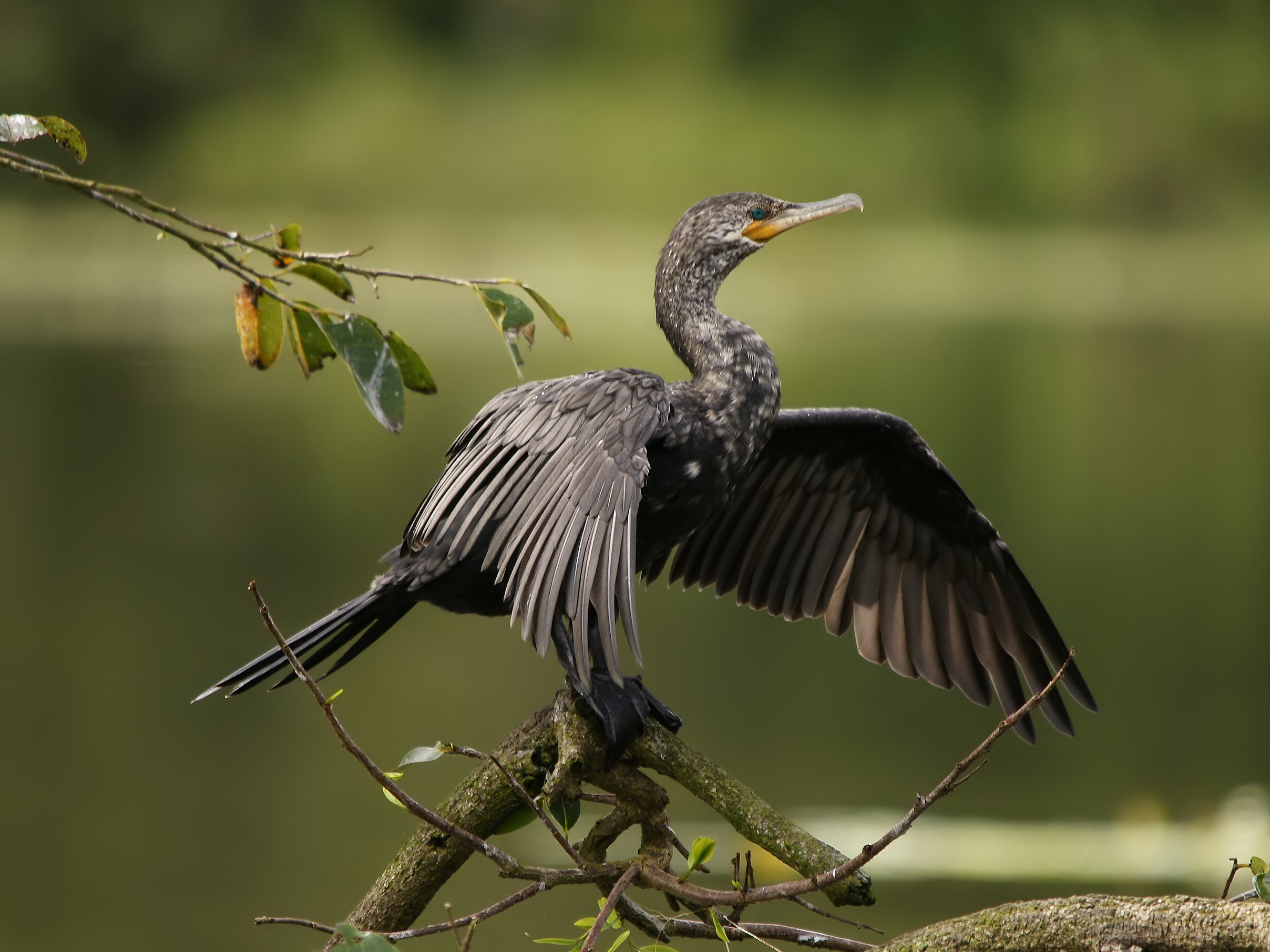
Neotropic cormorant

Order: Pelecaniformes Family: Phalacrocoracidae

- Neotropic cormorant (Phalacrocorax brasilianus)

== Anhingas ==
Order: Pelecaniformes Family: Anhingidae

- Anhinga (Anhinga anhinga)

== Stilts and avocets ==
Order: Charadriiformes Family: Recurvirostridae

- Black-necked stilt (Himantopus mexicanus)

== Plovers and lapwings ==
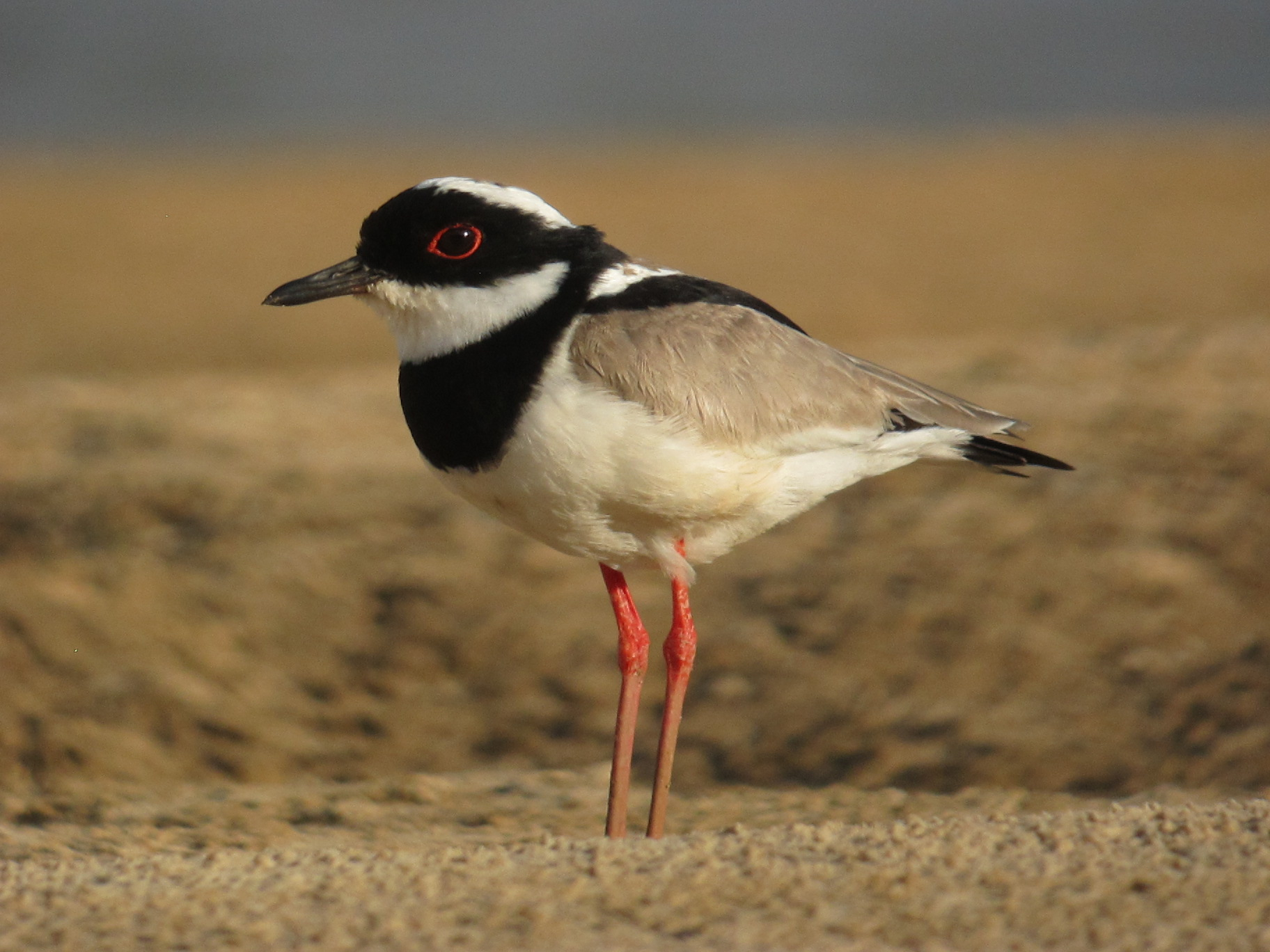
Pied lapwing

Order: Charadriiformes Family: Charadriidae

- American golden plover (Pluvialis dominica)
- Semipalmated plover (Charadrius semipalmatus)
- Collared plover (Charadrius collaris)
- Southern lapwing (Vanellus chilensis)
- Pied lapwing (Vanellus cayanus)

== Jacanas ==
Order: Charadriiformes Family: Jacanidae

- Wattled jacana (Jacana jacana)

== Sandpipers ==
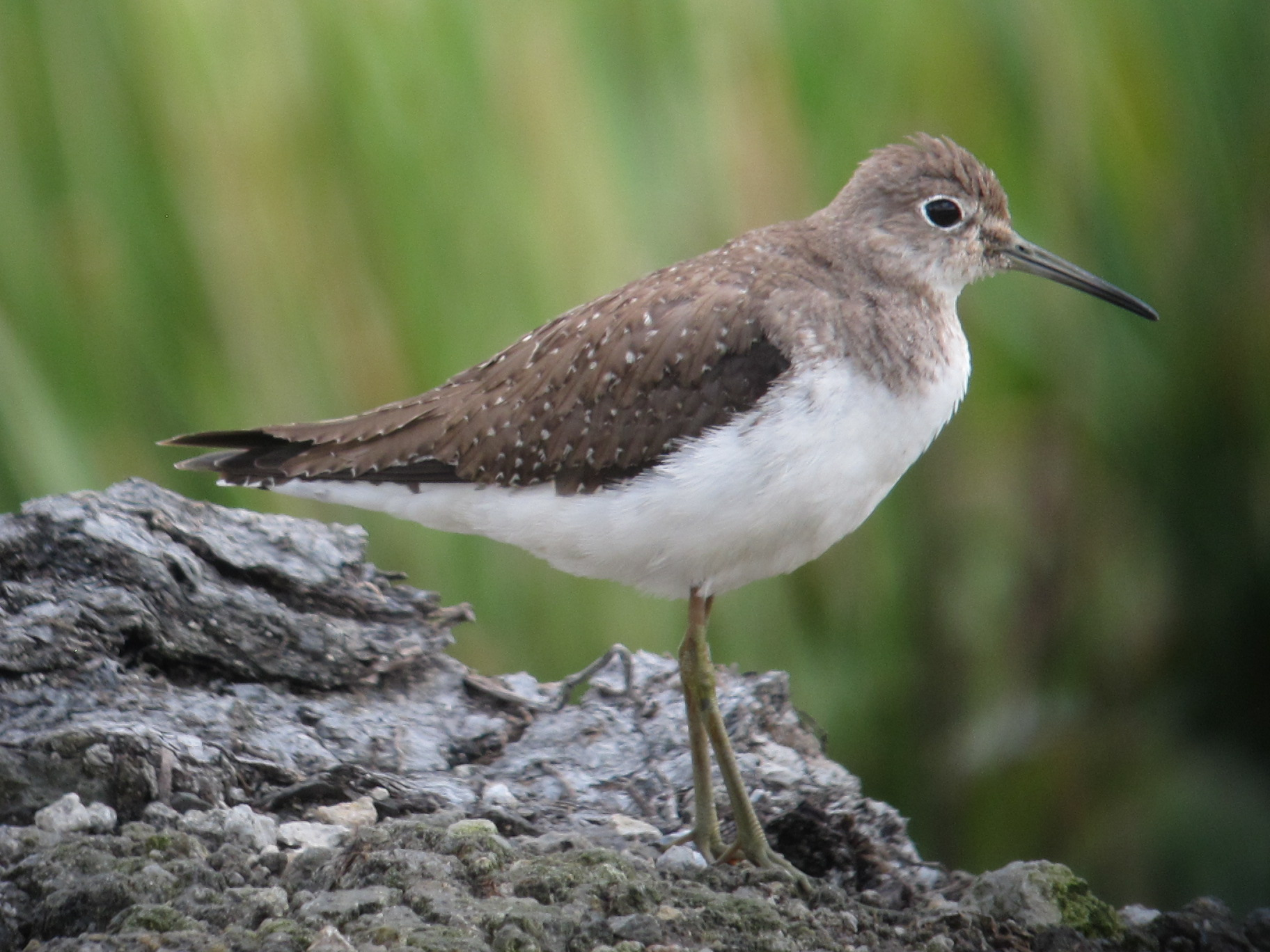
Solitary sandpiper

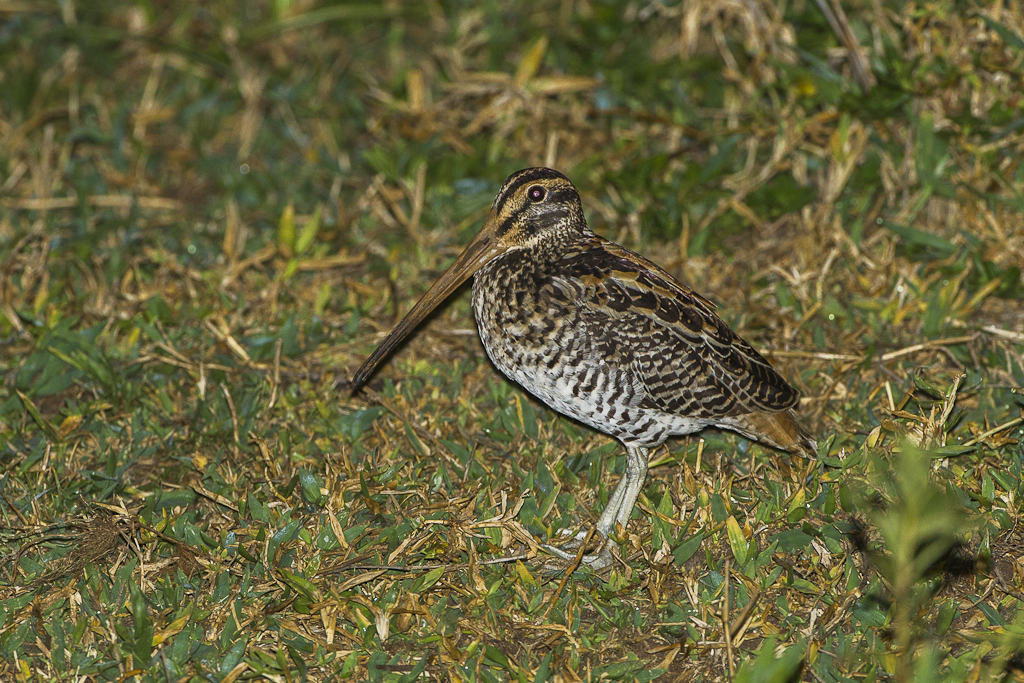
Giant snipe

Order: Charadriiformes Family: Scolopacidae

- Upland sandpiper (Bartramia longicauda)
- Hudsonian godwit (Limosa haemastica)
- Ruddy turnstone (Arenaria interpres)
- Stilt sandpiper (Calidris himantopus)
- Sanderling (Calidris alba)
- Least sandpiper (Calidris minutilla)
- White-rumped sandpiper (Calidris fuscicollis)
- Pectoral sandpiper (Calidris melanotos)
- Semipalmated sandpiper (Calidris pusilla) (A)
- Pantanal snipe (Gallinago paraguaiae)
- Giant snipe (Gallinago undulata)
- Spotted sandpiper (Actitis macularius)
- Solitary sandpiper (Tringa solitaria)
- Lesser yellowlegs (Tringa flavipes)
- Greater yellowlegs (Tringa melanoleuca)
- Wilson's phalarope (Steganopus tricolor)

== Gulls, terns, and skimmers ==
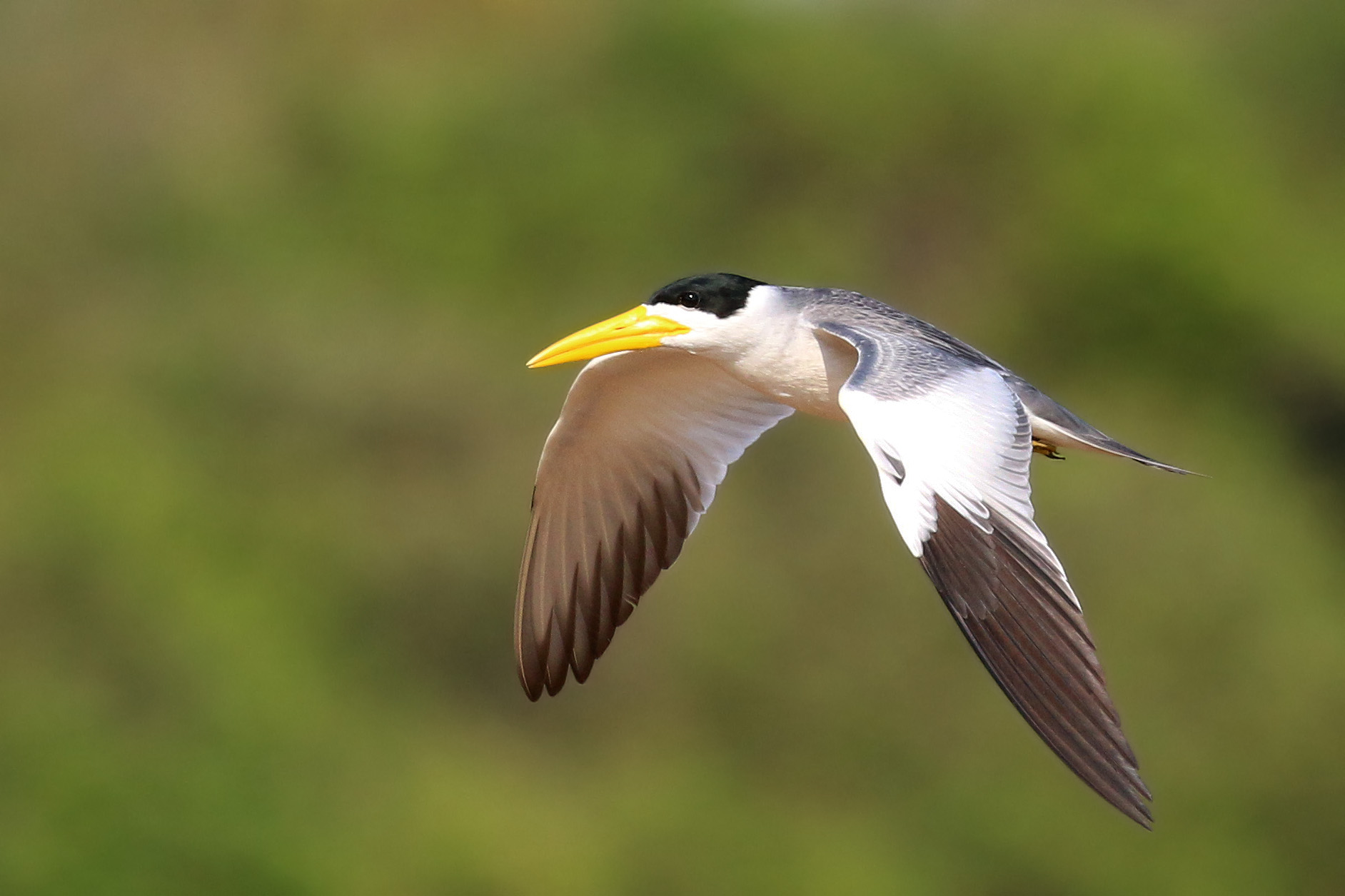
Large-billed tern

Order: Charadriiformes Family: Laridae

- Black skimmer (Rynchops niger)
- Grey-hooded gull (Chroicocephalus cirrocephalus) (A)
- Franklin's gull (Leucophaeus pipixcan) (A)
- Yellow-billed tern (Sternula superciliaris)
- Large-billed tern (Phaetusa simplex)

== New World vultures ==
Order: Cathartiformes Family: Cathartidae

- Turkey vulture (Cathartes aura)
- Lesser yellow-headed vulture (Cathartes burrovianus)
- Black vulture (Coragyps atratus)
- King vulture (Sarcoramphus papa)

== Ospreys ==
Order: Accipitriformes Family: Pandionidae

- Osprey (Pandion haliaetus)

== Hawks ==
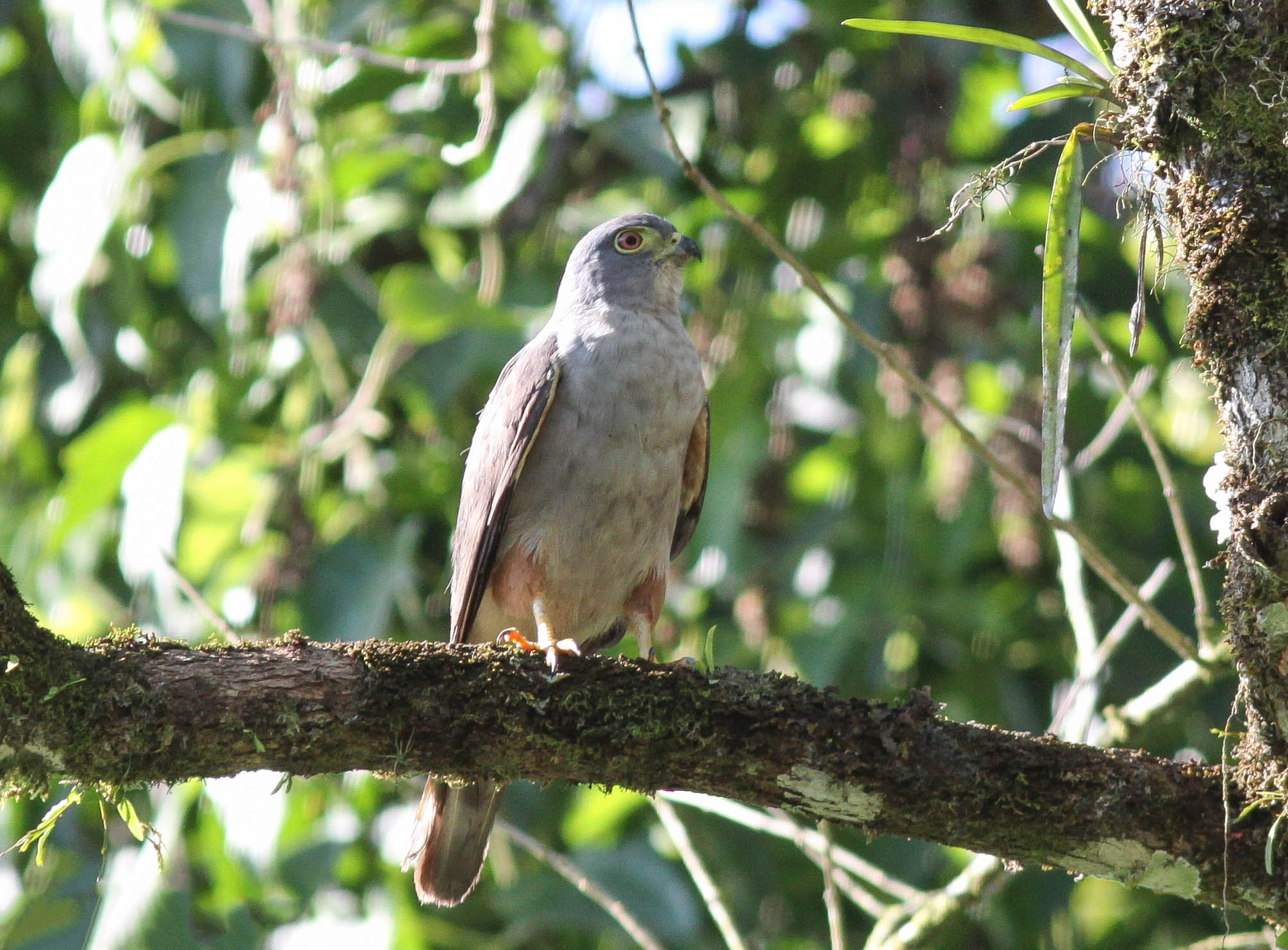
Rufous-thighed kite

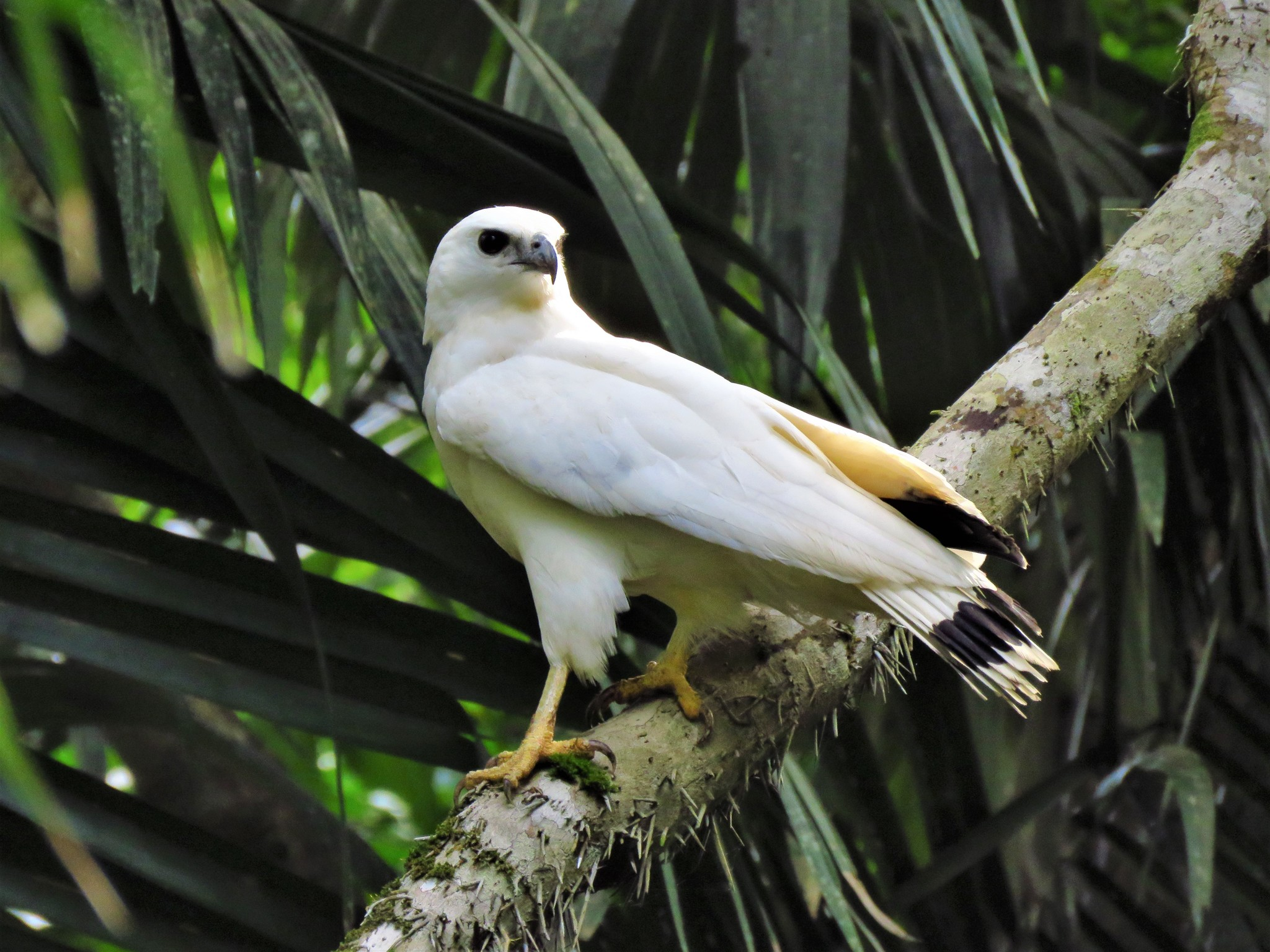
White hawk

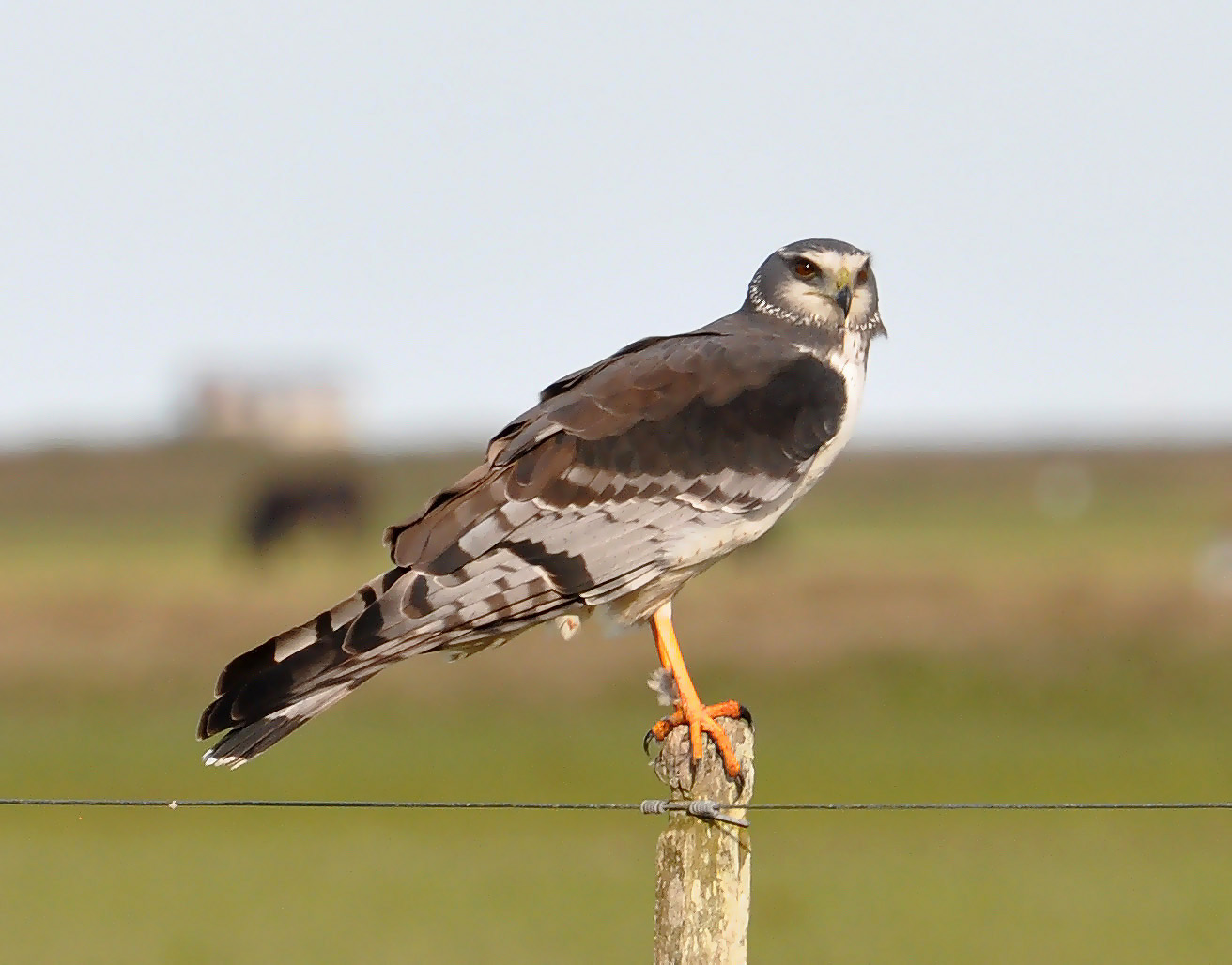
Long-winged harrier

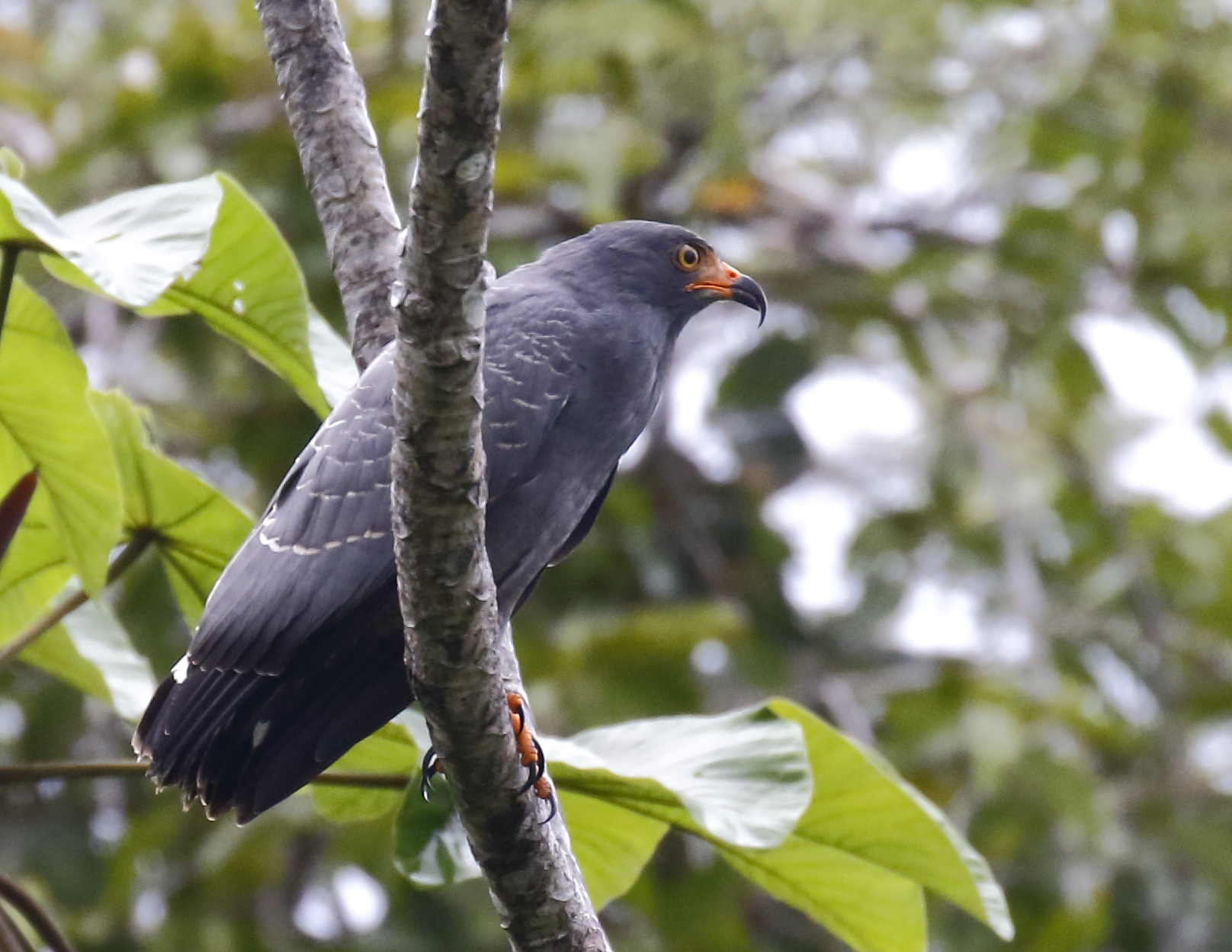
Slender-billed kite

Order: Accipitriformes Family: Accipitridae

- White-tailed kite (Elanus leucurus)
- Pearl kite (Gampsonyx swainsonii)
- Hook-billed kite (Chondrohierax uncinatus)
- Grey-headed kite (Leptodon cayanensis)
- Swallow-tailed kite (Elanoides forficatus)
- Harpy eagle (Harpia harpyja)
- Black hawk eagle (Spizaetus tyrannus)
- Black-and-white hawk eagle (Spizaetus melanoleucus)
- Ornate hawk eagle (Spizaetus ornatus)
- Rufous-thighed kite (Harpagus diodon)
- Long-winged harrier (Circus buffoni)
- Grey-bellied hawk (Accipiter poliogaster)
- Sharp-shinned hawk (Accipiter striatus)
- Bicolored hawk (Accipiter bicolor)
- Black-collared hawk (Busarellus nigricollis)
- Crane hawk (Geranospiza caerulescens)
- Mississippi kite (Ictinia mississippiensis)
- Plumbeous kite (Ictinia plumbea)
- Snail kite (Rostrhamus sociabilis)
- Slender-billed kite (Helicolestes hamatus)
- Roadside hawk (Rupornis magnirostris)
- Harris's hawk (Parabuteo unicinctus)
- Savanna hawk (Buteogallus meridionalis)
- Great black hawk (Buteogallus urubitinga)
- Crowned solitary eagle (Buteogallus coronatus)
- White-tailed hawk (Geranoaetus albicaudatus)
- Black-chested buzzard-eagle (Geranoaetus melanoleucus)
- White hawk (Pseudastur albicollis)
- Grey-lined hawk (Buteo nitidus)
- Broad-winged hawk (Buteo platypterus) (A)
- Short-tailed hawk (Buteo brachyurus)
- Swainson's hawk (Buteo swainsoni) (A)
- Zone-tailed hawk (Buteo albonotatus)

== Barn Owls ==
Order: Strigiformes Family: Tytonidae

- American barn owl (Tyto furcata)

== Owls ==
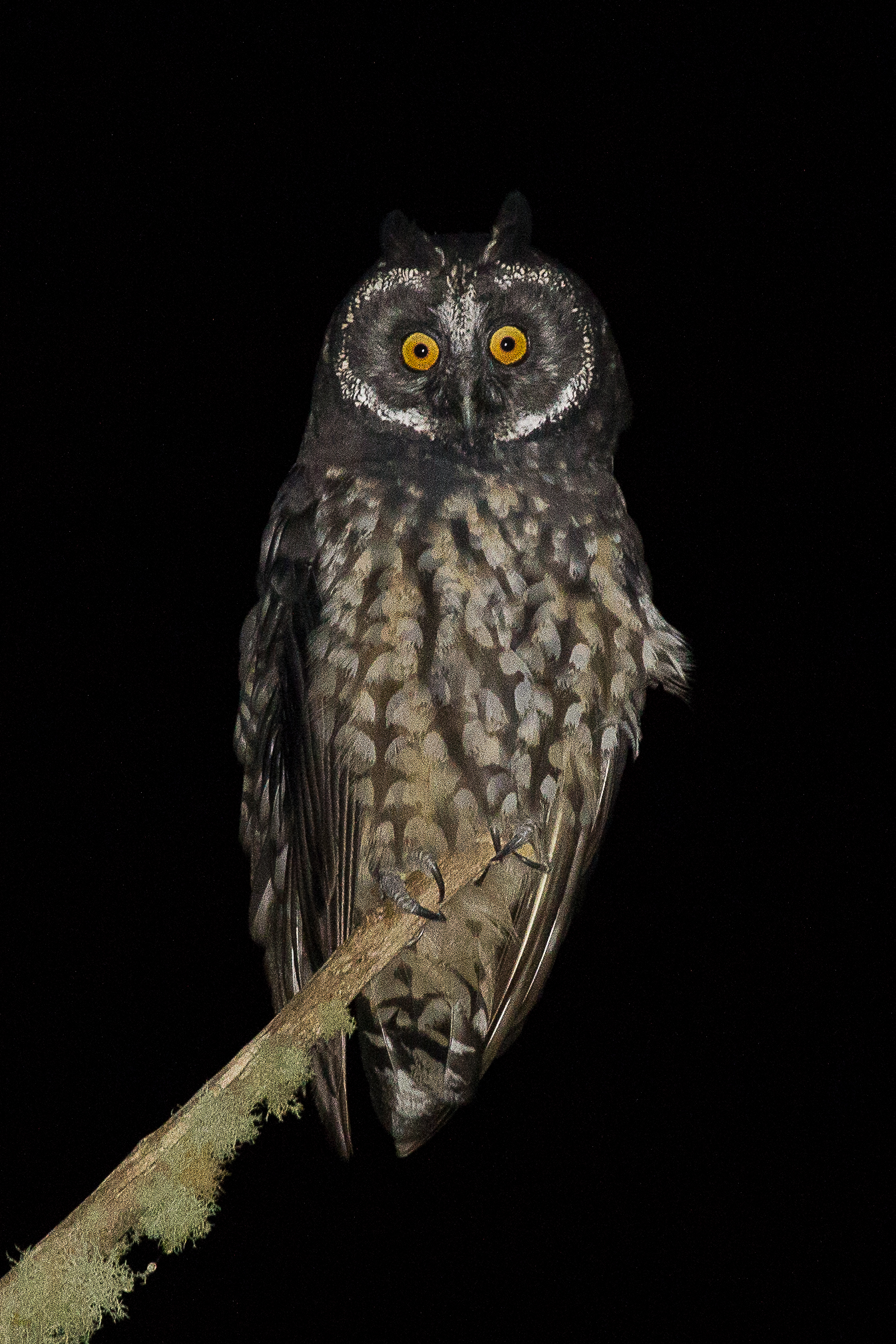
Stygian owl

Order: Strigiformes Family: Strigidae

- Least pygmy owl (Glaucidium minutissimum)
- Ferruginous pygmy owl (Glaucidium brasilianum)
- Burrowing owl (Athene cunicularia)
- Buff-fronted owl (Aegolius harrisii)
- Stygian owl (Asio stygius)
- Striped owl (Asio clamator)
- Short-eared owl (Asio flammeus)
- Tropical screech owl (Megascops choliba)
- Black-capped screech owl (Megascops atricapilla)
- Spectacled owl (Pulsatrix perspicillata)
- Great horned owl (Bubo virginianus)
- Mottled owl (Ciccaba virgata)
- Black-banded owl (Ciccaba huhula)

== Trogons ==
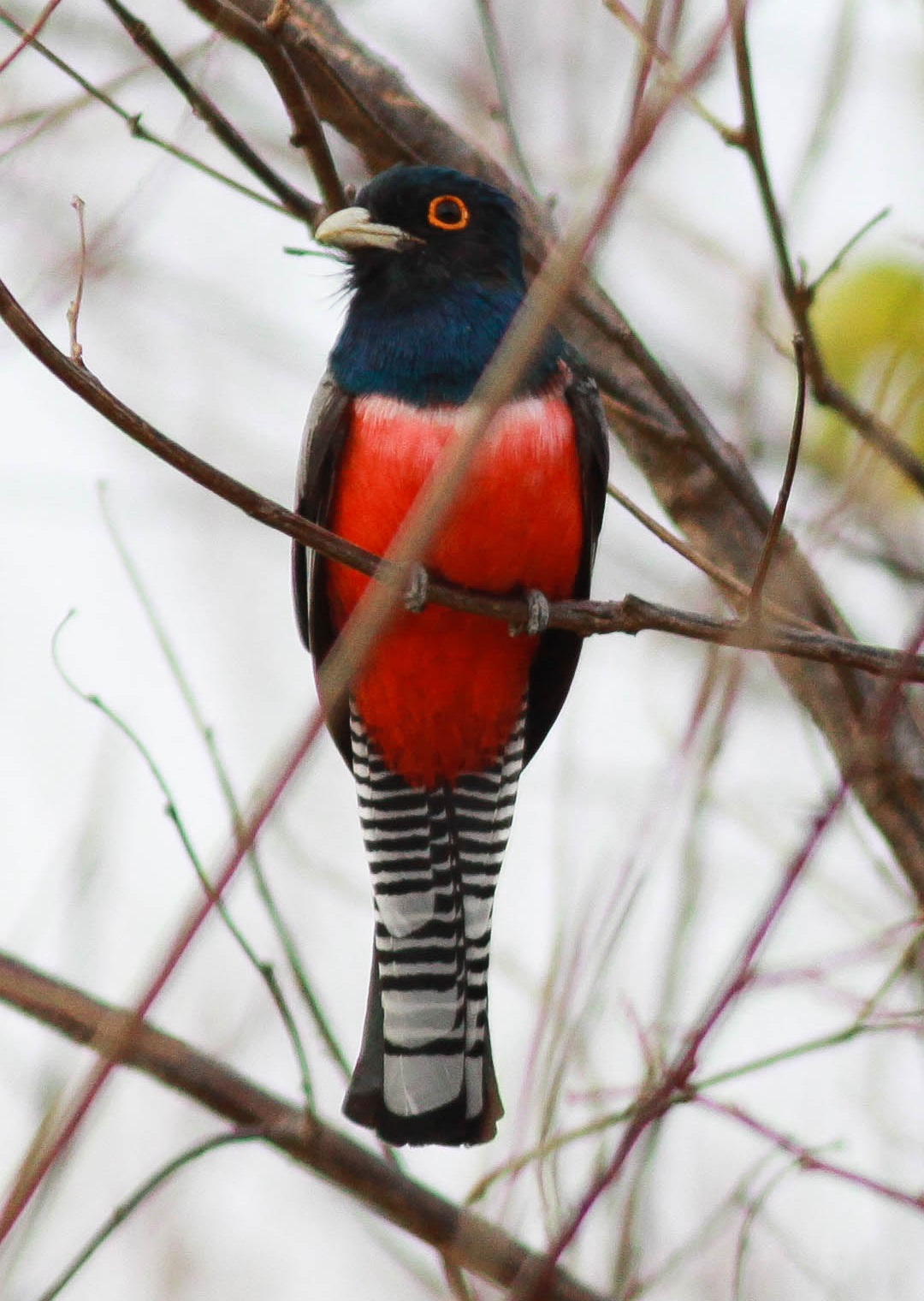
Blue-crowned trogon

Order: Trogoniformes Family: Trogonidae

- Black-tailed trogon (Trogon melanurus) (A)
- Green-backed trogon (Trogon viridis)
- Blue-crowned trogon (Trogon curucui)
- Surucua trogon (Trogon surrucura)

== Jacamars ==
Order: Piciformes Family: Galbulidae

- Brown jacamar (Brachygalba lugubris)
- Rufous-tailed jacamar (Galbula ruficauda)

== Puffbirds ==
Order: Piciformes Family: Bucconidae

- Buff-bellied puffbird (Notharchus swainsoni)
- White-eared puffbird (Nystalus chacuru)
- Spot-backed puffbird (Nystalus maculatus)
- Rusty-breasted nunlet (Nonnula rubecula)
- Black-fronted nunbird (Monasa nigrifrons)
- Swallow-winged puffbird (Chelidoptera tenebrosa)

== Woodpeckers and piculets ==
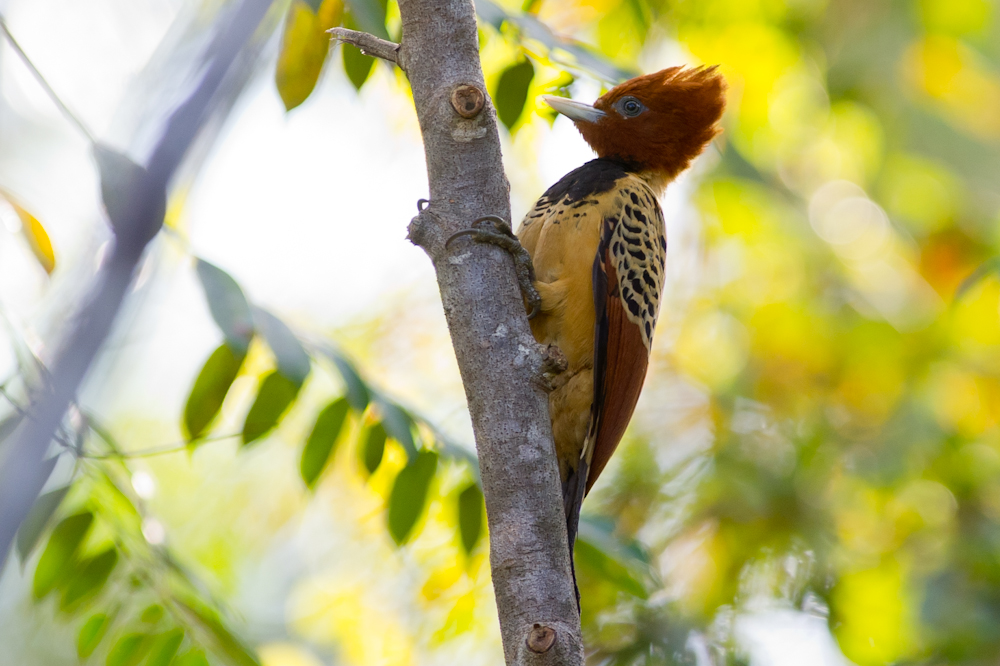
Kaempfer's woodpecker

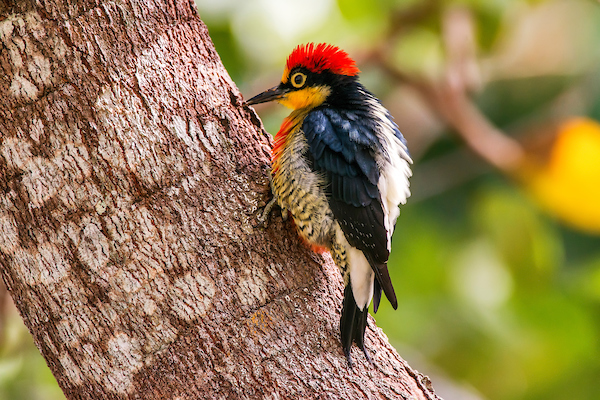
Yellow-fronted woodpecker

Order: Piciformes Family: Picidae

- White-wedged piculet (Picumnus albosquamatus)
- Lineated woodpecker (Dryocopus lineatus)
- Cream-colored woodpecker (Celeus flavus)
- Kaempfer's woodpecker (Celeus obrieni) (EB)
- Ochre-backed woodpecker (Celeus ochraceus) (EB)
- Blond-crested woodpecker (Celeus flavescens)
- White-throated woodpecker (Piculus leucolaemus)
- Yellow-throated woodpecker (Piculus flavigula)
- Green-barred woodpecker (Colaptes melanochloros)
- Campo flicker (Colaptes campestris)
- Red-necked woodpecker (Campephilus rubricollis) (A)
- Crimson-crested woodpecker (Campephilus melanoleucos)
- White woodpecker (Melanerpes candidus)
- Yellow-tufted woodpecker (Melanerpes cruentatus)
- Yellow-fronted woodpecker (Melanerpes flavifrons)
- Checkered woodpecker (Veniliornis mixtus)
- Little woodpecker (Veniliornis passerinus)

== Toucans ==
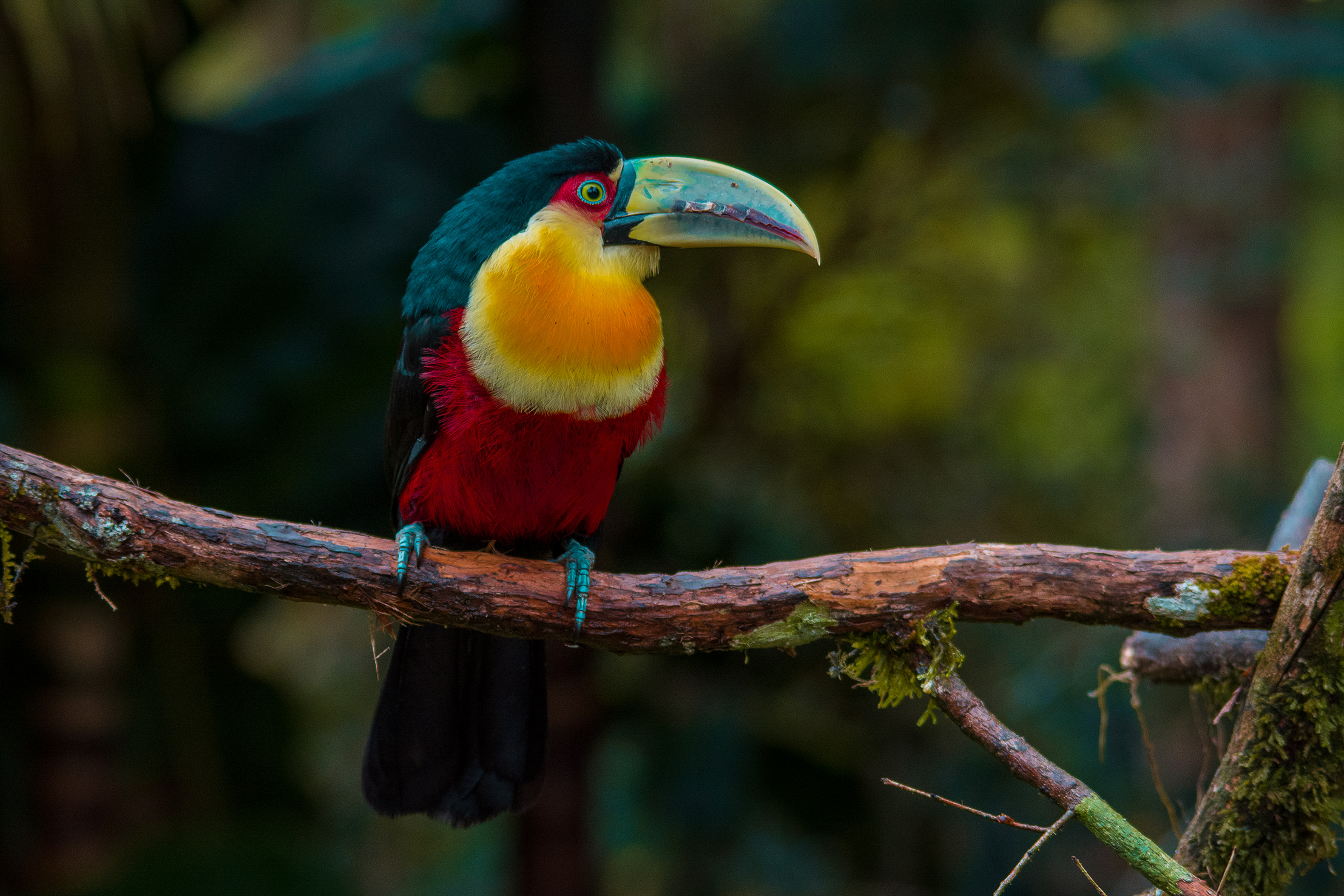
Red-breasted toucan

Order: Piciformes Family: Ramphastidae

- Toco toucan (Ramphastos toco)
- Channel-billed toucan (Ramphastos vitellinus)
- Red-breasted toucan (Ramphastos dicolorus)
- Lettered aracari (Pteroglossus inscriptus)
- Black-necked aracari (Pteroglossus aracari)
- Chestnut-eared aracari (Pteroglossus castanotis)

== Motmots ==
Order: Coraciiformes Family: Momotidae

- Amazonian motmot (Momotus momota)
- Rufous-capped motmot (Baryphthengus ruficapillus)

== Kingfishers ==
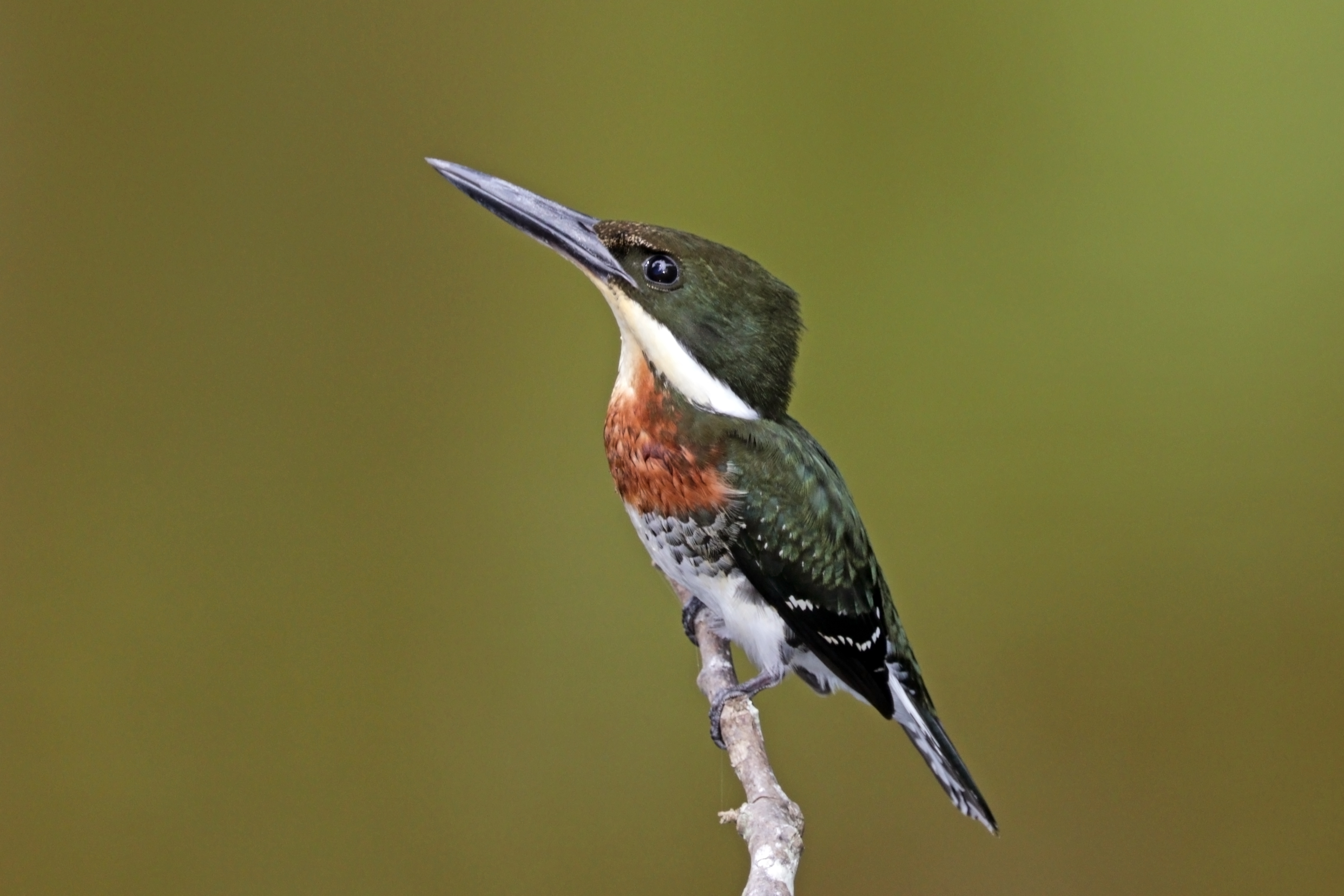
Green kingfisher

Order: Coraciiformes Family: Alcedinidae

- Ringed kingfisher (Megaceryle torquata)
- Amazon kingfisher (Chloroceryle amazona)
- American pygmy kingfisher (Chloroceryle aenea)
- Green kingfisher (Chloroceryle americana)
- Green-and-rufous kingfisher (Chloroceryle inda)

== Seriemas ==
Order: Cariamiformes Family: Cariamidae

- Red-legged seriema (Cariama cristata)

== Falcons ==
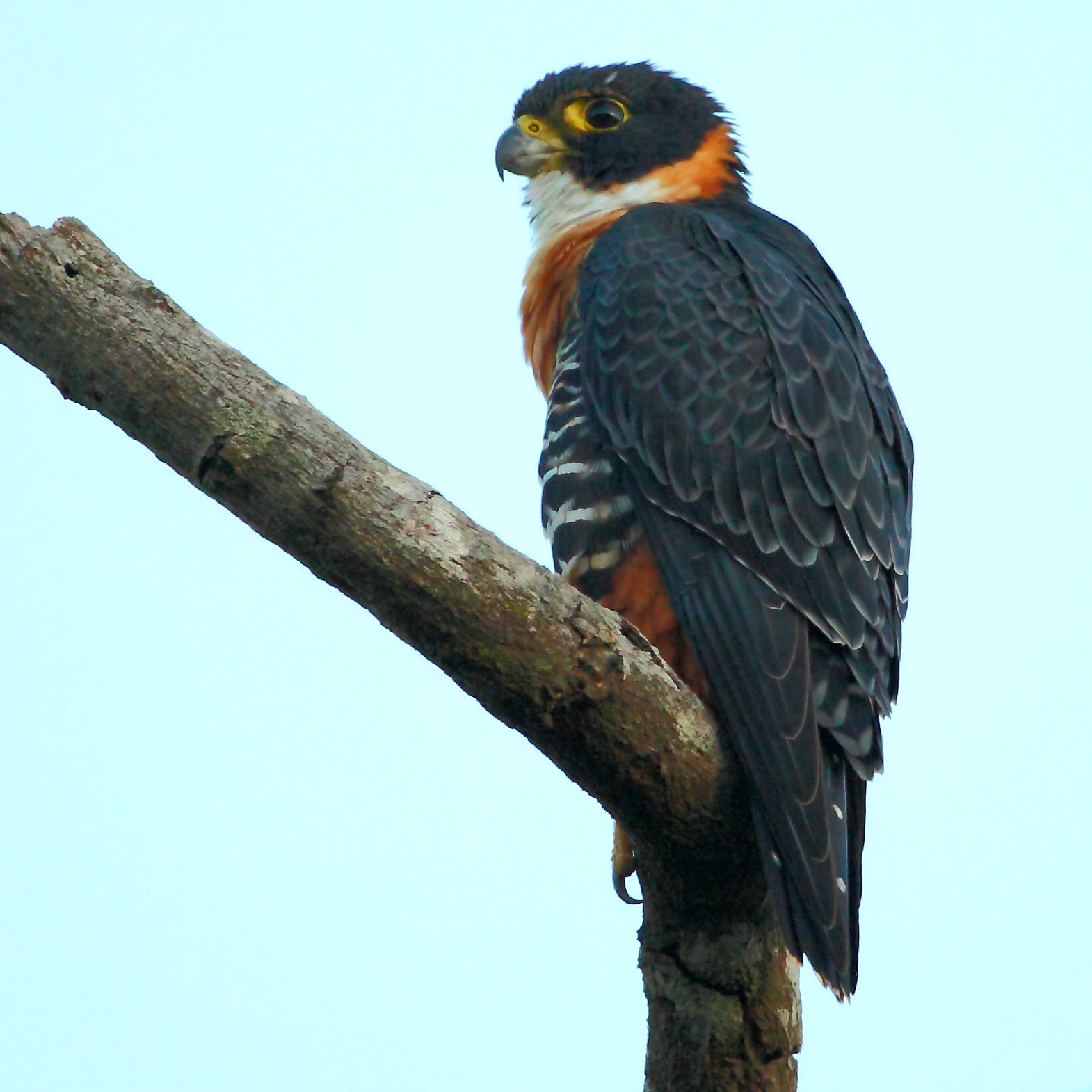
Orange-breasted falcon

Order: Falconiformes Family: Falconidae

- Laughing falcon (Herpetotheres cachinnans)
- Barred forest falcon (Micrastur ruficollis)
- Collared forest falcon (Micrastur semitorquatus)
- Crested caracara (Caracara plancus)
- Red-throated caracara (Ibycter americanus)
- Yellow-headed caracara (Milvago chimachima)
- American kestrel (Falco sparverius)
- Bat falcon (Falco rufigularis)
- Orange-breasted falcon (Falco deiroleucus)
- Aplomado falcon (Falco femoralis)
- Peregrine falcon (Falco peregrinus)

== Parrots ==
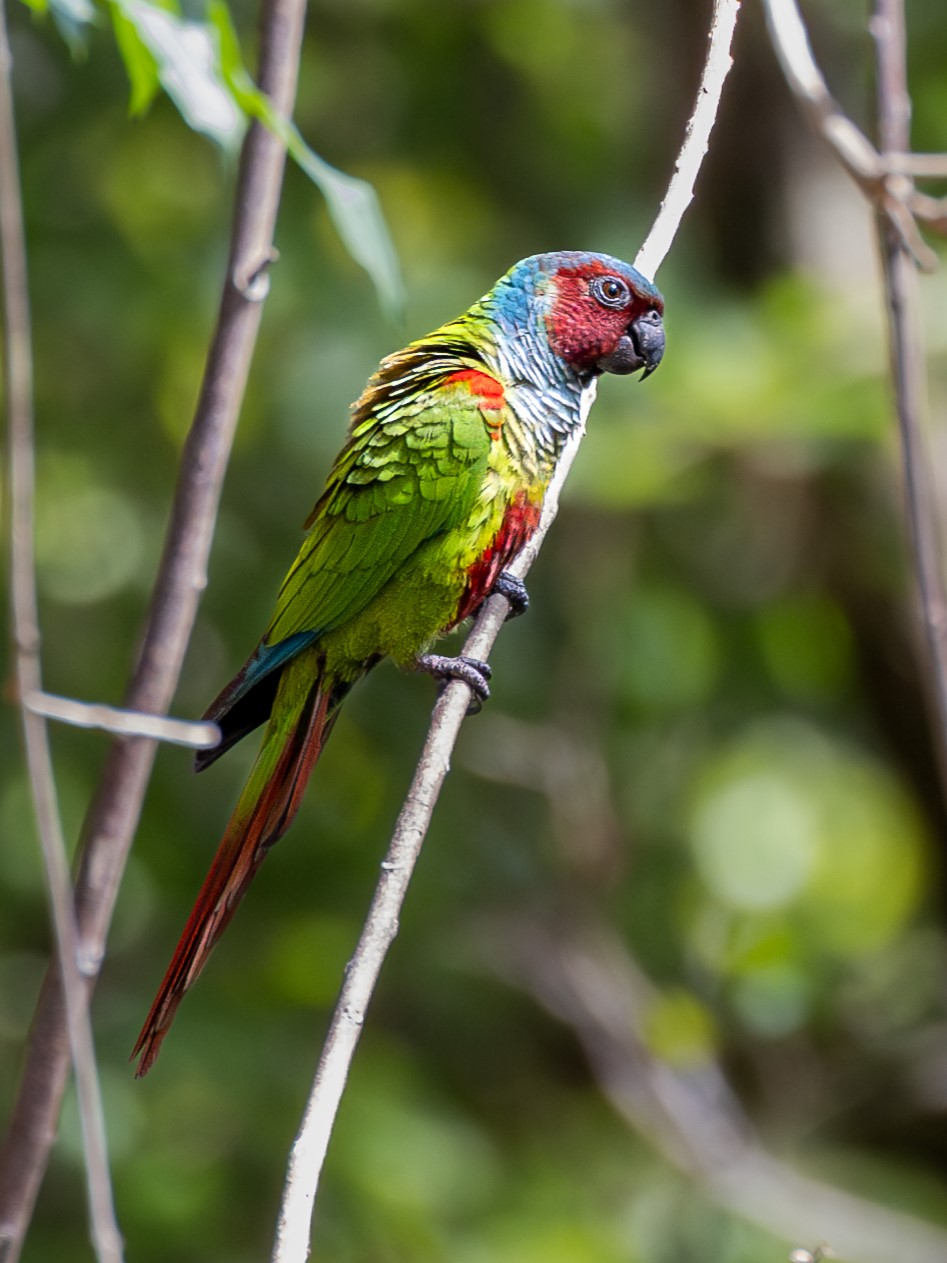
Pfrimer's parakeet

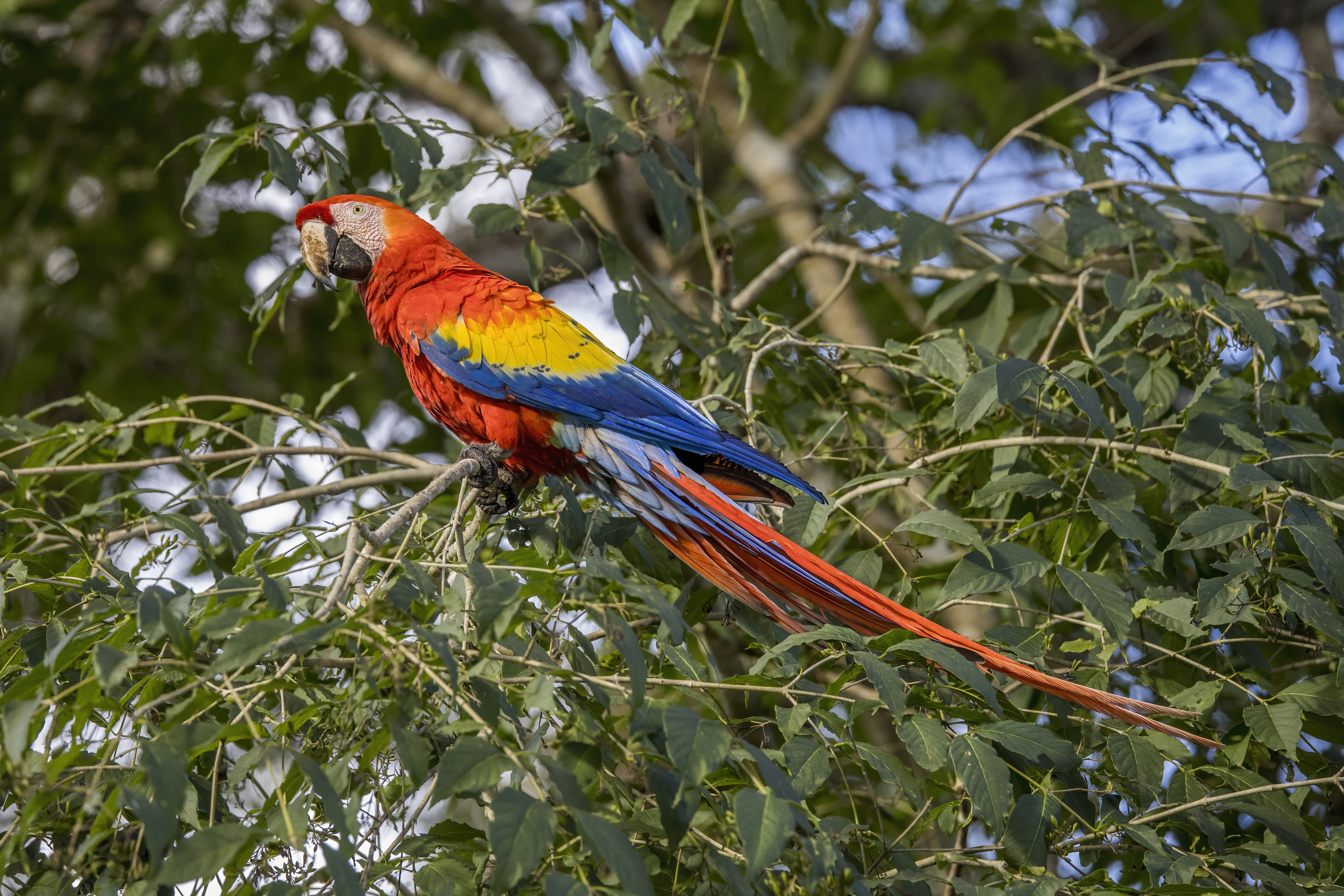
Scarlet macaw

Order: Psittaciformes Family: Psittacidae

- Yellow-chevroned parakeet (Brotogeris chiriri)
- Scaly-headed parrot (Pionus maximiliani)
- Blue-headed parrot (Pionus menstruus)
- Yellow-faced parrot (Alipiopsitta xanthops)
- Turquoise-fronted parrot (Amazona aestiva)
- Orange-winged parrot (Amazona amazonica)
- Blue-winged parrotlet (Forpus xanthopterygius)
- Pfrimer's parakeet (Pyrrhura pfrimeri) (EB)
- Hyacinth macaw (Anodorhynchus hyacinthinus)
- Peach-fronted parakeet (Eupsittula aurea)
- Cactus parakeet (Eupsittula cactorum) (EB)
- Jandaya parakeet (Aratinga jandaya) (EB)
- Golden-capped parakeet (Aratinga auricapillus) (EB)
- Red-bellied macaw (Orthopsittaca manilatus)
- Yellow-collared macaw (Primolius auricollis)
- Blue-winged macaw (Primolius maracana)
- Blue-and-yellow macaw (Ara ararauna)
- Scarlet macaw (Ara macao)
- Red-and-green macaw (Ara chloropterus)
- Red-shouldered macaw (Diopsittaca nobilis)
- Blue-crowned parakeet (Psittacara acuticaudatus)
- White-eyed parakeet (Psittacara leucophthalmus)

== Manakins ==
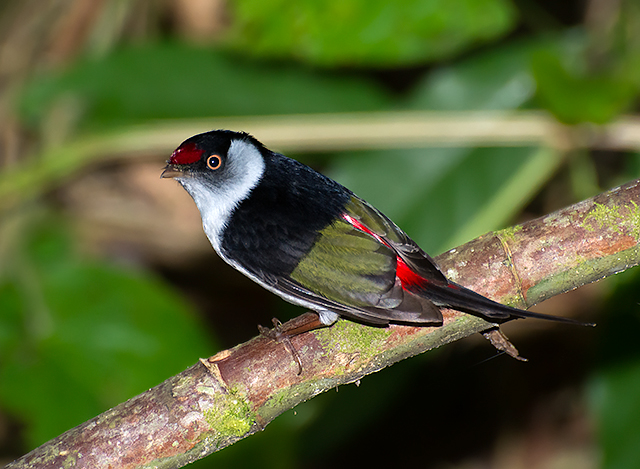
Pin-tailed manakin

Order: Passeriformes Family: Pipridae

- Pale-bellied tyrant manakin (Neopelma pallescens)
- Pin-tailed manakin (Ilicura militaris) (EB)
- Helmeted manakin (Antilophia galeata)
- Band-tailed manakin (Pipra fasciicauda)
- Fiery-capped manakin (Machaeropterus pyrocephalus)

== Cotingas ==
Order: Passeriformes Family: Cotingidae

- Red-ruffed fruitcrow (Pyroderus scutatus)
- Swallow-tailed cotinga (Phibalura flavirostris)

== Tityras, mourners, and allies ==
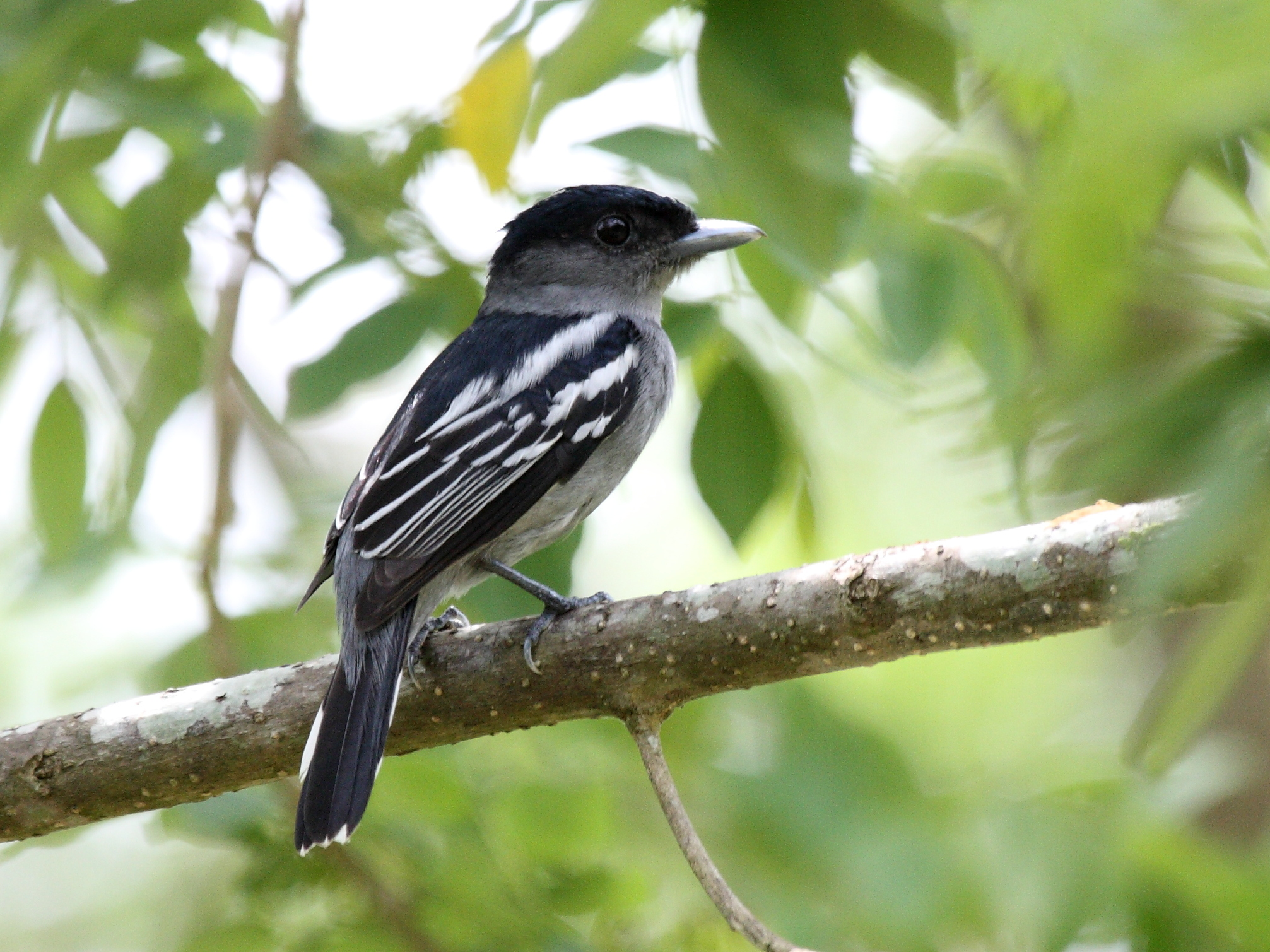
White-winged becard

Order: Passeriformes Family: Tityridae

- Sharpbill (Oxyruncus cristatus)
- Sulphur-rumped flycatcher (Myiobius barbatus)
- Black-tailed flycatcher (Myiobius atricaudus)
- Greenish schiffornis (Schiffornis virescens)
- Black-crowned tityra (Tityra inquisitor)
- Black-tailed tityra (Tityra cayana)
- Masked tityra (Tityra semifasciata)
- Green-backed becard (Pachyramphus viridis)
- White-winged becard (Pachyramphus polychopterus)
- Crested becard (Pachyramphus validus)
- White-naped xenopsaris (Xenopsaris albinucha)
- White-throated spadebill (Platyrinchus mystaceus)

== Tyrant flycatchers ==
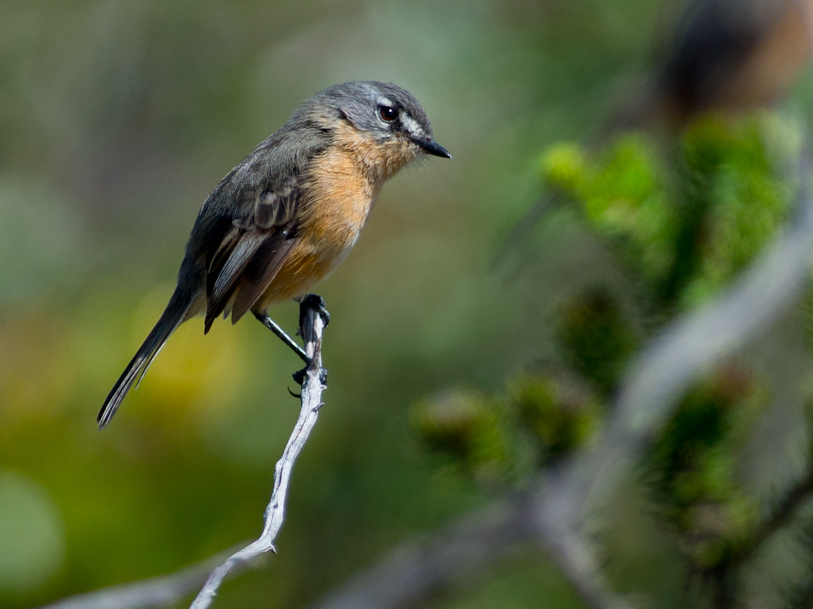
Rufous-sided pygmy tyrant

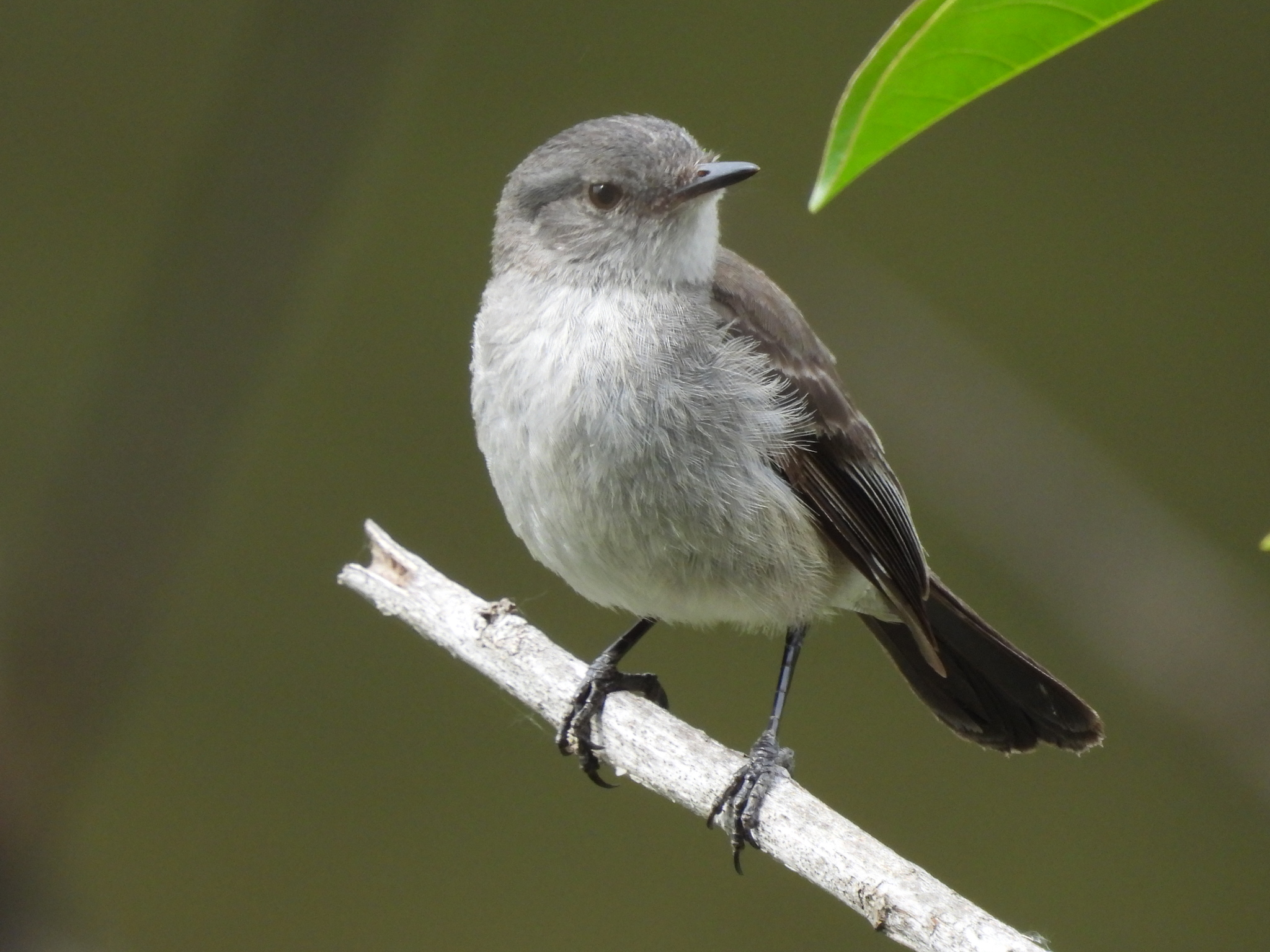
Sooty tyrannulet

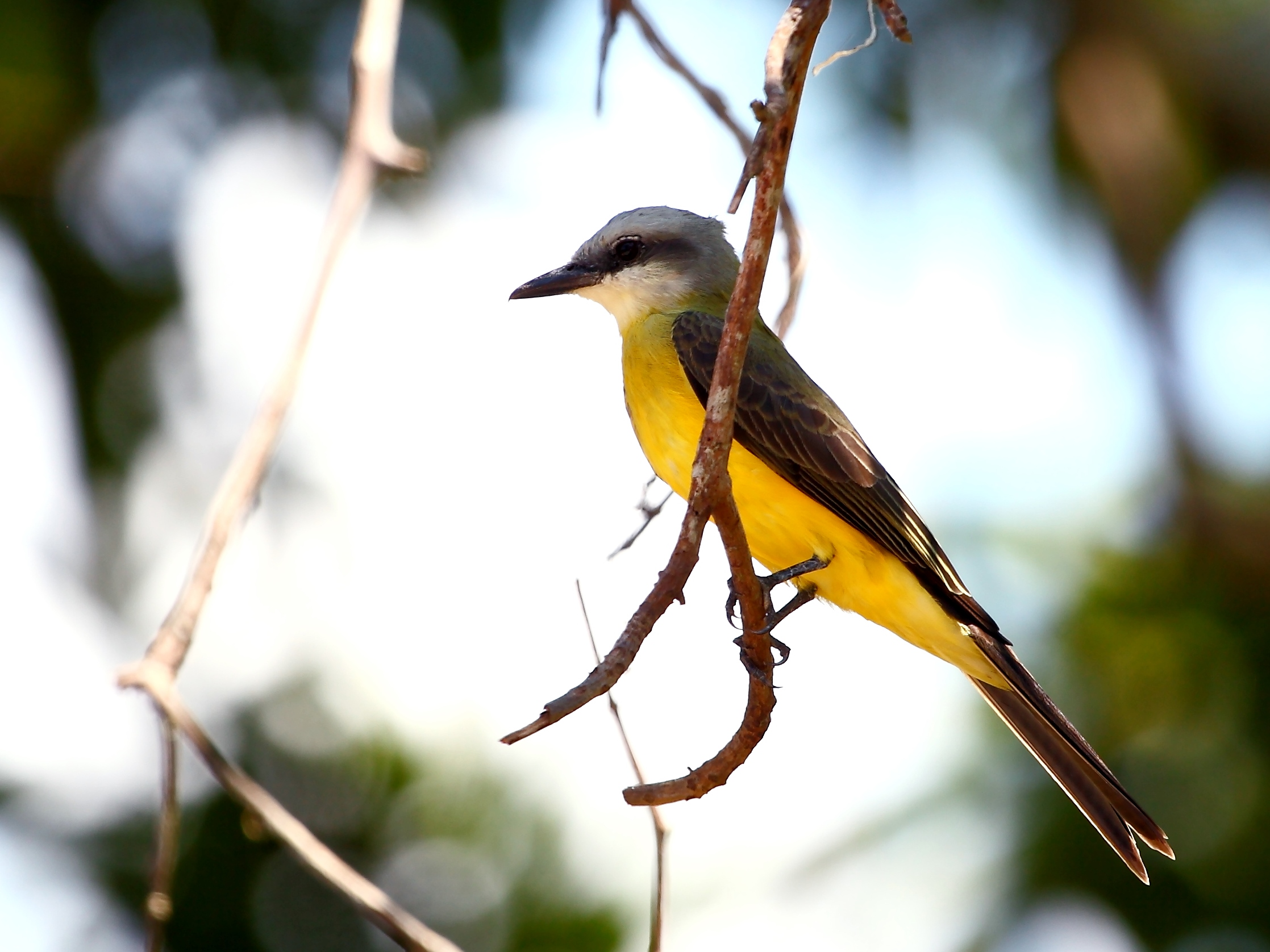
White-throated kingbird

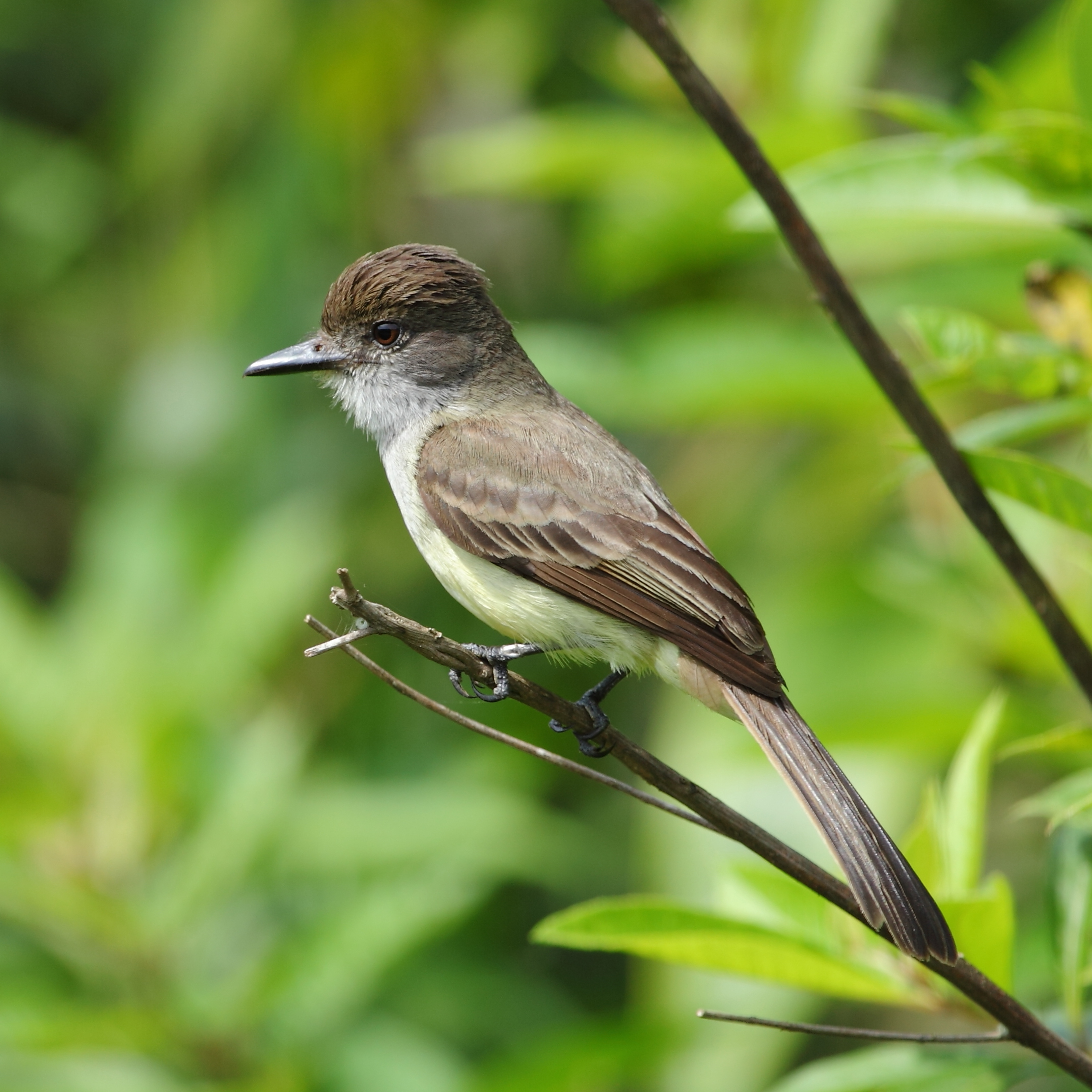
Short-crested flycatcher

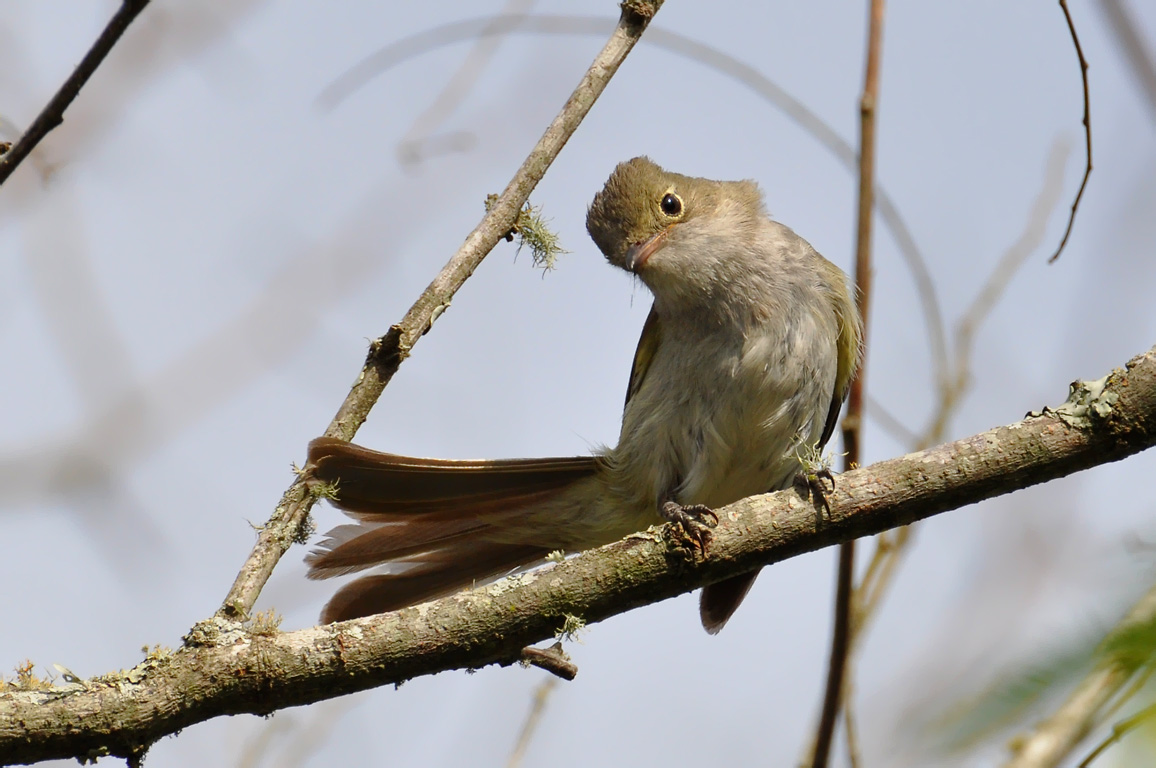
Small-billed elaenia

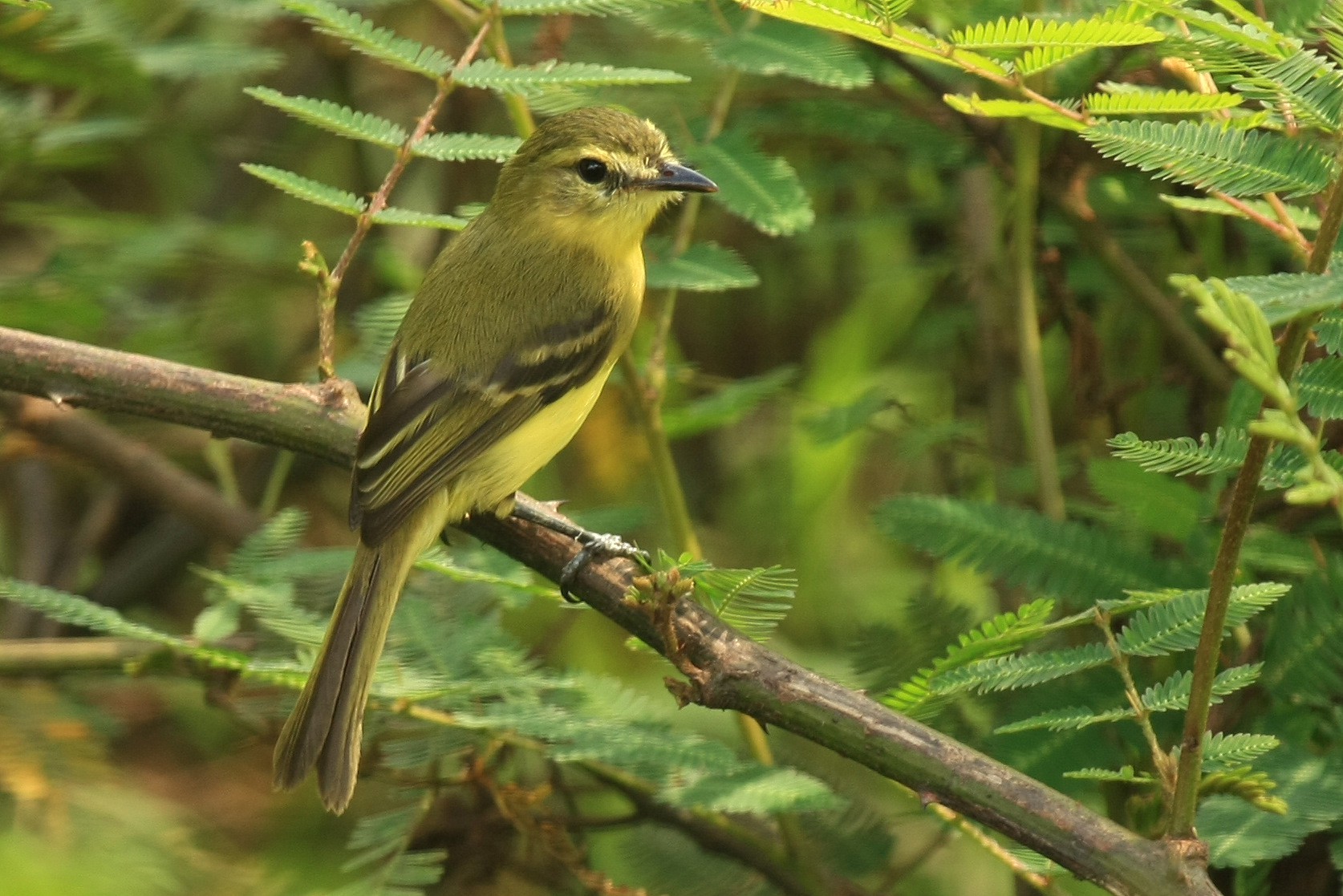
Yellow tyrannulet

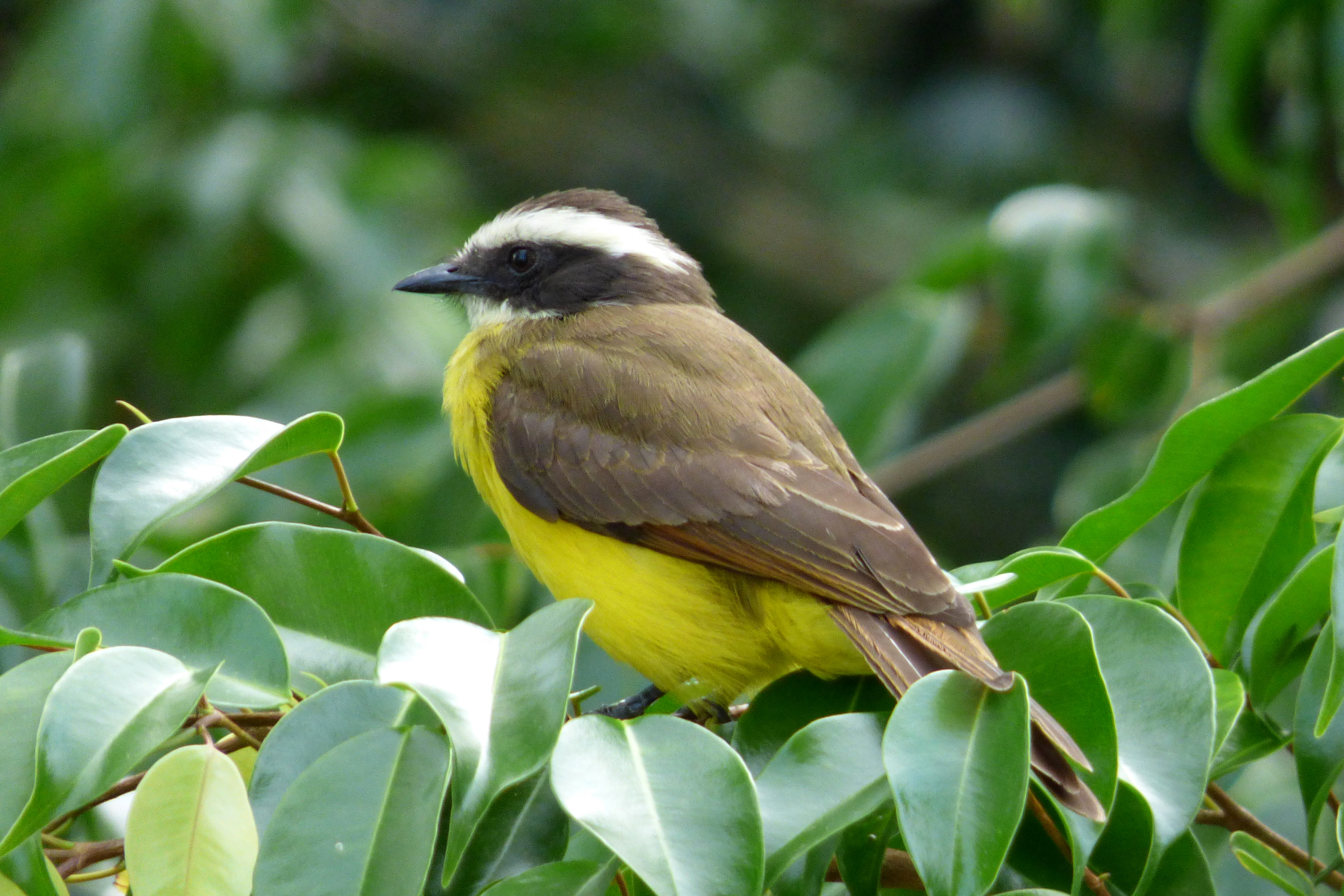
Rusty-margined flycatcher

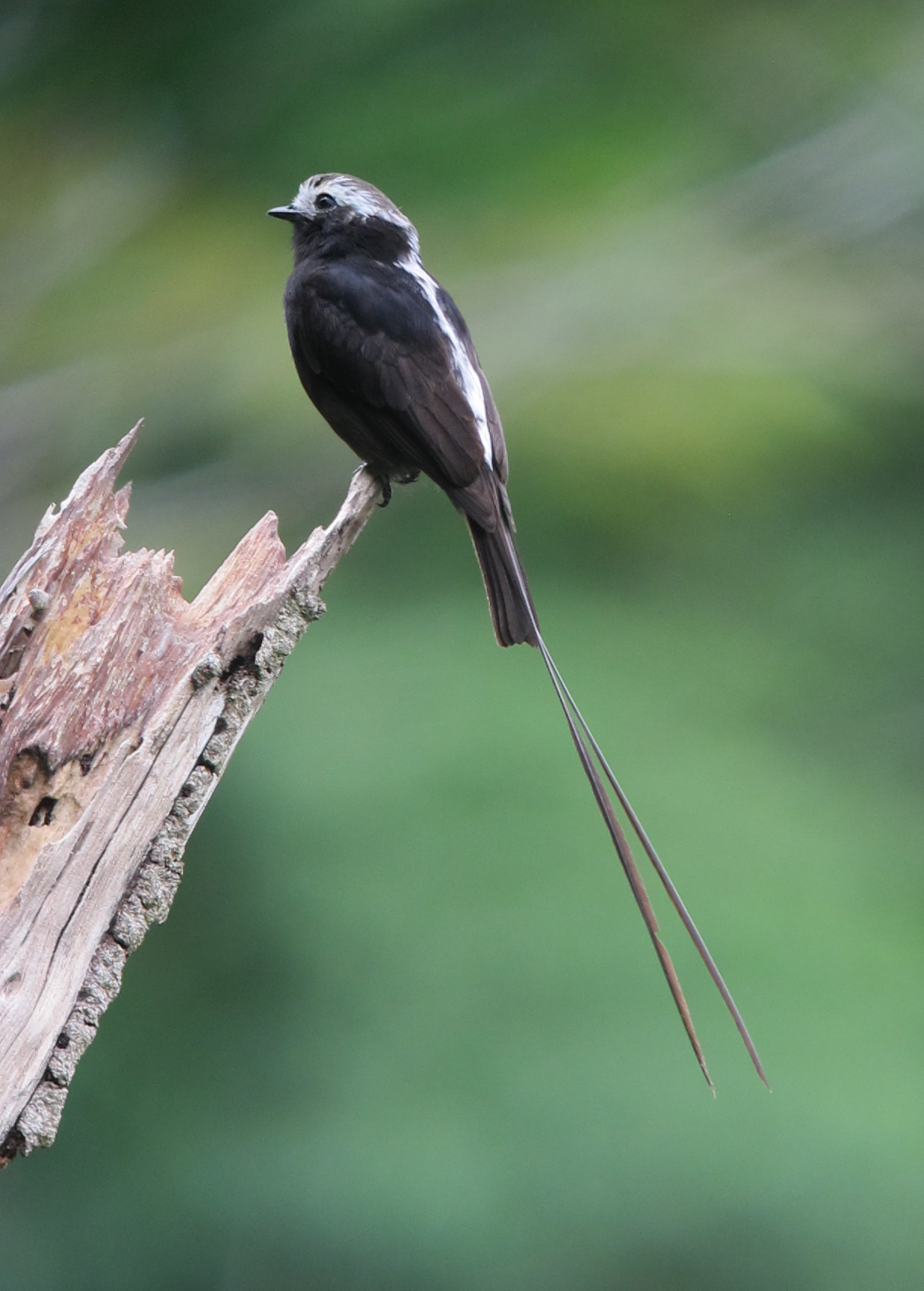
Long-tailed tyrant

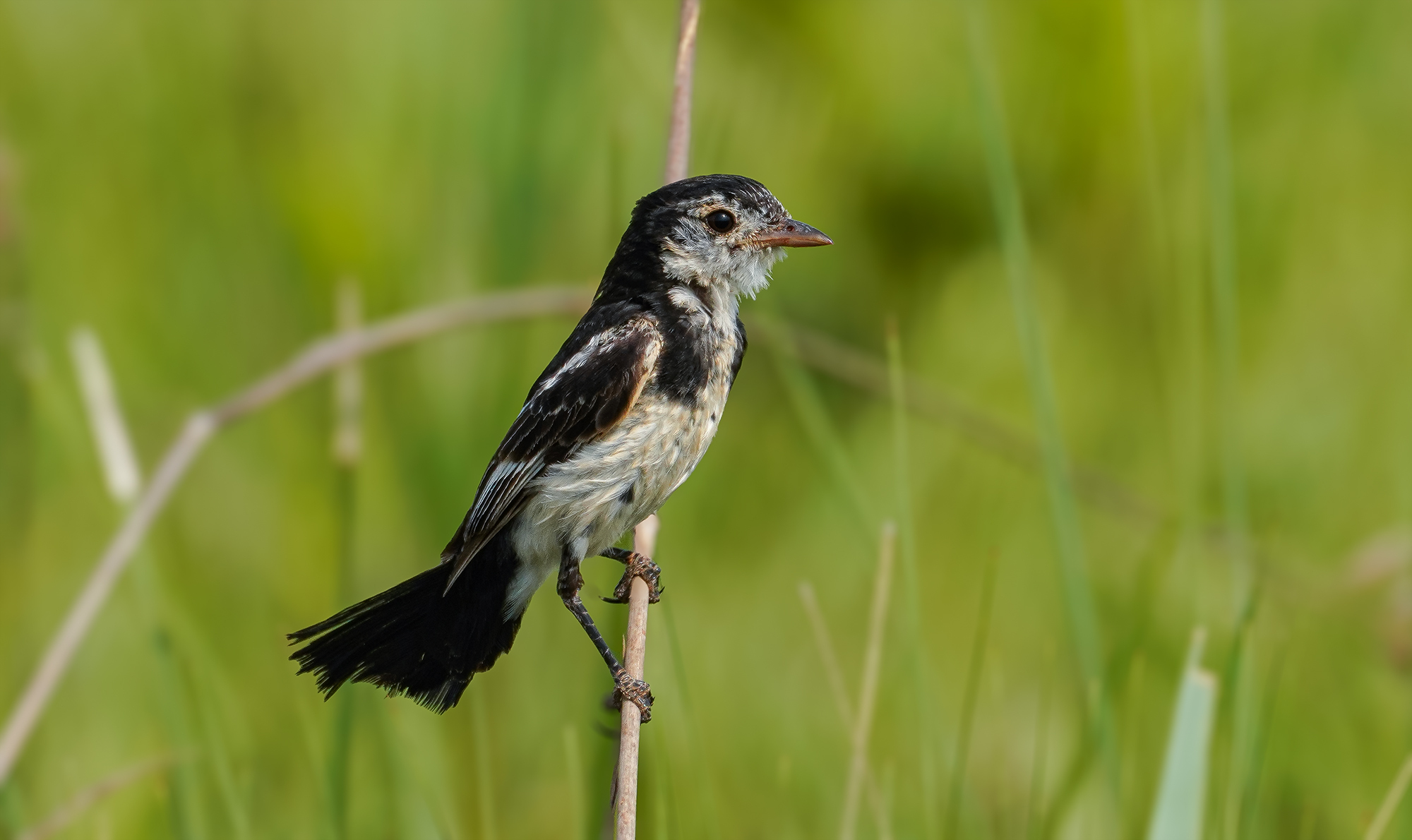
Cock-tailed tyrant

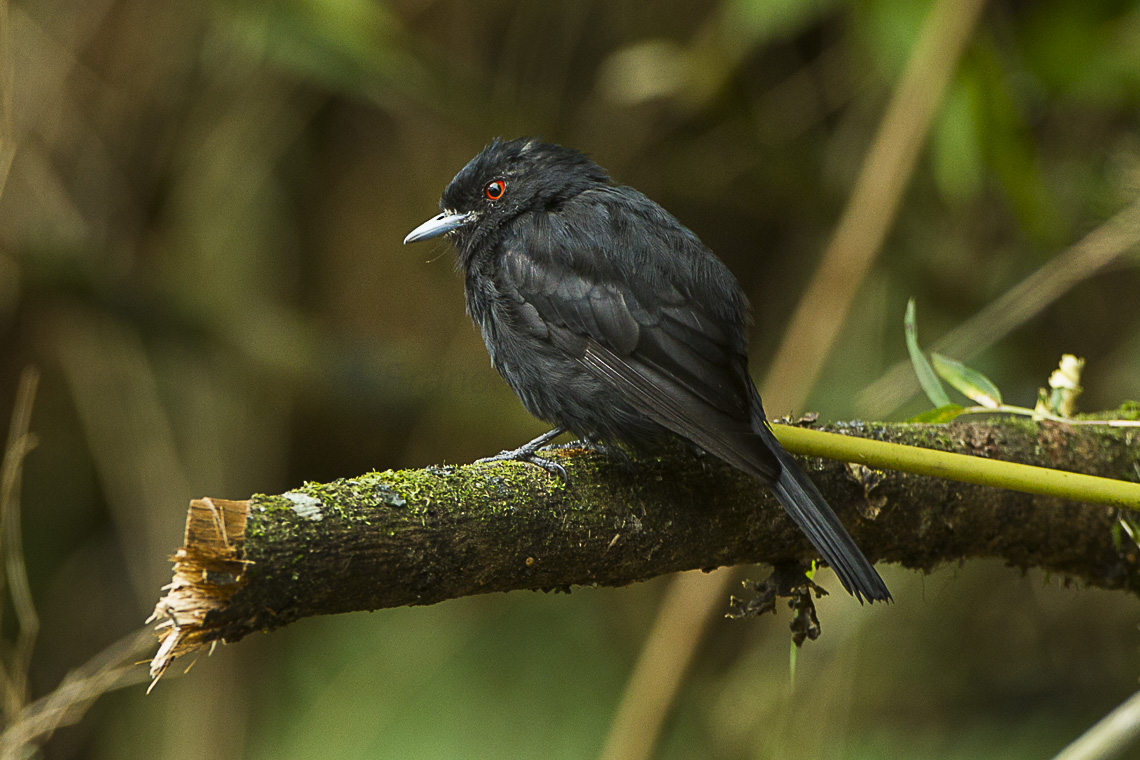
Blue-billed black tyrant

Order: Passeriformes Family: Tyrannidae

- Southern antpipit (Corythopis delalandi)
- Minas Gerais tyrannulet (Phylloscartes roquettei) (EB)
- Grey-hooded flycatcher (Mionectes rufiventris)
- Sepia-capped flycatcher (Leptopogon amaurocephalus)
- Yellow-olive flycatcher (Tolmomyias sulphurescens)
- Yellow-breasted flycatcher (Tolmomyias flaviventris)
- Eared pygmy tyrant (Myiornis auricularis)
- Stripe-necked tody tyrant (Hemitriccus striaticollis)
- Pearly-vented tody tyrant (Hemitriccus margaritaceiventer)
- Smoky-fronted tody flycatcher (Poecilotriccus latirostris)
- Rusty-fronted tody flycatcher (Poecilotriccus latirostris)
- Common tody flycatcher (Todirostrum cinereum)
- Cliff flycatcher (Hirundinea ferruginea)
- Plain tyrannulet (Inezia inornata)
- Amazonian tyrannulet (Inezia subflava)
- Tawny-crowned pygmy tyrant (Euscarthmus meloryphus)
- Rufous-sided pygmy tyrant (Euscarthmus rufomarginatus)
- Rough-legged tyrannulet (Acrochordupus burmeisteri)
- Southern beardless tyrannulet (Camptostoma obsoletum)
- Yellow-bellied elaenia (Elaenia flavogaster)
- Large elaenia (Elaenia spectabilis)
- Chilean elaenia (Elaenia chilensis)
- Small-billed elaenia (Elaenia parvirostris)
- Olivaceous elaenia (Elaenia mesoleuca)
- Plain-crested elaenia (Elaenia cristata)
- Lesser elaenia (Elaenia chiriquensis)
- Highland elaenia (Elaenia obscura)
- Suiriri flycatcher (Suiriri suiriri)
- Forest elaenia (Myiopagis gaimardii)
- Grey elaenia (Myiopagis caniceps)
- Greenish elaenia (Myiopagis viridicata)
- Yellow tyrannulet (Capsiempis flaveola)
- Southern mouse-colored tyrannulet (Phaeomyias murina)
- Reiser's tyrannulet (Phyllomyias reiseri)
- Planalto tyrannulet (Phyllomyias fasciatus)
- Sharp-tailed tyrant (Culicivora caudacuta)
- Bearded tachuri (Polystictus pectoralis)
- Subtropical doradito (Pseudocolopteryx acutipennis)
- Sooty tyrannulet (Serpophaga nigricans)
- White-crested tyrannulet (Serpophaga subcristata)
- Rufous-tailed attila (Attila phoenicurus)
- Dull-capped attila (Attila bolivianus)
- Piratic flycatcher (Legatus leucophaius)
- Rufous-tailed flatbill (Ramphotrigon ruficauda)
- Dusky-capped flycatcher (Myiarchus tuberculifer)
- Swainson's flycatcher (Myiarchus swainsoni)
- Short-crested flycatcher (Myiarchus ferox)
- Brown-crested flycatcher (Myiarchus tyrannulus)
- Sibilant sirystes (Sirystes sibilator)
- Greyish mourner (Rhytipterna simplex)
- Rufous casiornis (Casiornis rufus)
- Ash-throated casiornis (Casiornis fuscus)
- Great kiskadee (Pitangus sulphuratus)
- Lesser kiskadee (Philohydor lictor)
- Cattle tyrant (Machetornis rixosa)
- Streaked flycatcher (Myiodynastes maculatus)
- Sulphury flycatcher (Tyrannopsis sulphurea)
- Boat-billed flycatcher (Megarynchus pitangua)
- Rusty-margined flycatcher (Myiozetetes cayanensis)
- Social flycatcher (Myiozetetes similis)
- White-throated kingbird (Tyrannus albogularis)
- Tropical kingbird (Tyrannus melancholicus)
- Fork-tailed flycatcher (Tyrannus savana)
- Crowned slaty flycatcher (Griseotyrannus aurantioatrocristatus)
- Variegated flycatcher (Empidonomus varius)
- Chapada flycatcher (Guyramemua affine)
- Southern scrub flycatcher (Sublegatus modestus)
- Long-tailed tyrant (Colonia colonus)
- White-headed marsh tyrant (Arundinicola leucocephala)
- Black-backed water tyrant (Fluvicola albiventer)
- Masked water tyrant (Fluvicola nengeta)
- Vermilion flycatcher (Pyrocephalus rubinus)
- Streamer-tailed tyrant (Gubernetes yetapa)
- Cock-tailed tyrant (Alectrurus tricolor)
- Bran-colored flycatcher (Myiophobus fasciatus)
- Fuscous flycatcher (Cnemotriccus fuscatus)
- Euler's flycatcher (Lathrotriccus euleri)
- Olive-sided flycatcher (Contopus cooperi)
- Southern tropical pewee (Contopus cinereus)
- Yellow-browed tyrant (Satrapa icterophrys)
- Spectacled tyrant (Hymenops perspicillatus) (A)
- Riverside tyrant (Knipolegus orenocensis)
- Amazonian black tyrant (Knipolegus poecilocercus)
- Caatinga black tyrant (Knipolegus franciscanus) (EB)
- Crested black tyrant (Knipolegus lophotes)
- Velvety black tyrant (Knipolegus nigerrimus) (EB)
- Blue-billed black tyrant (Knipolegus cyanirostris)
- White-rumped monjita (Xolmis velatus)
- Grey monjita (Nengetus cinereus)

== Antbirds ==
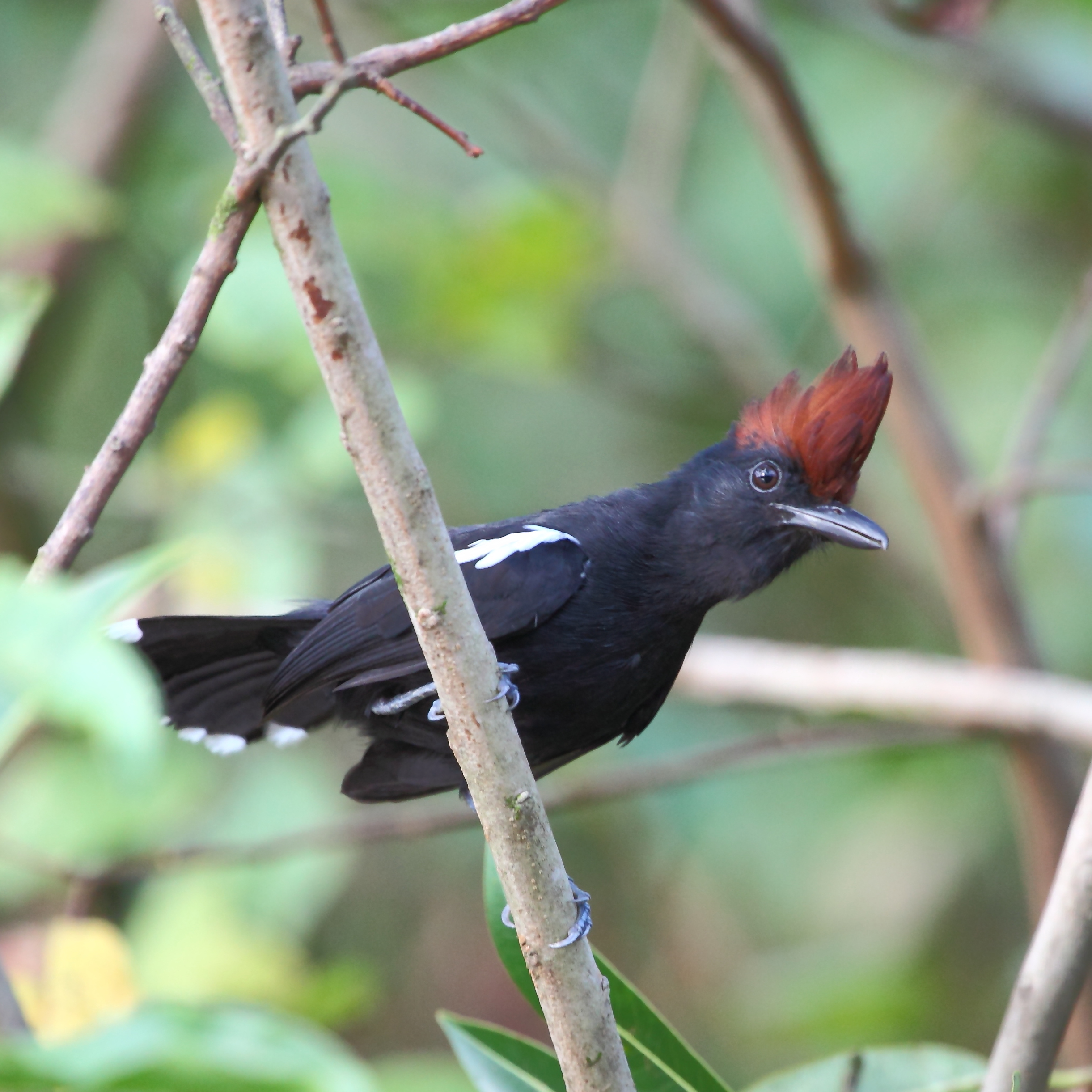
Glossy antshrike

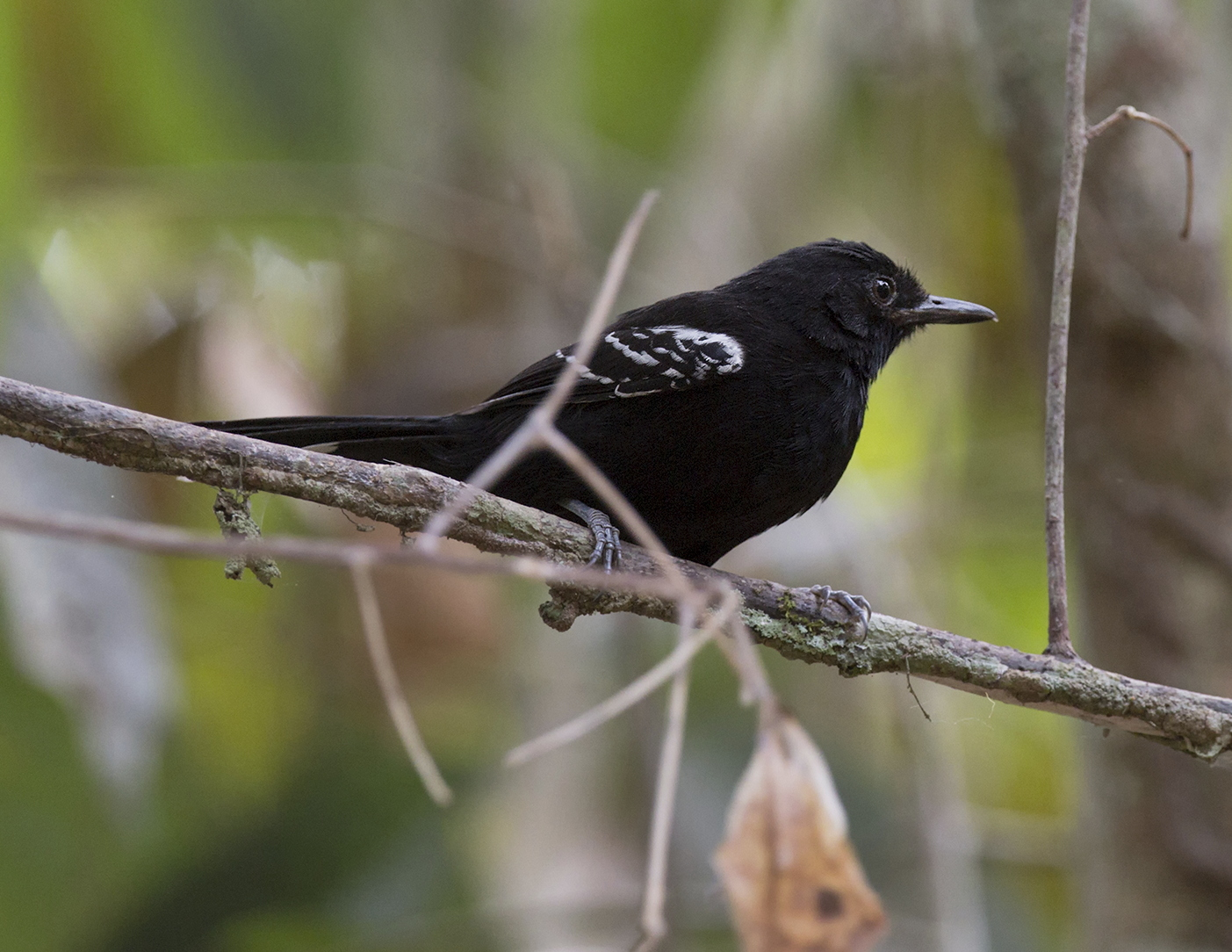
Bananal antbird

Order: Passeriformes Family: Thamnophilidae

- Black-throated antbird (Myrmophylax atrothorax)
- White-fringed antwren (Formicivora grisea)
- Black-bellied antwren (Formicivora melanogaster)
- Rusty-backed antwren (Formicivora rufa)
- Plain antvireo (Dysithamnus mentalis)
- Large-billed antwren (Herpsilochmus longirostris)
- Black-capped antwren (Herpsilochmus atricapillus)
- Glossy antshrike (Sakesphorus luctuosus) (EB)
- Barred antshrike (Thamnophilus doliatus)
- Rufous-winged antshrike (Thamnophilus torquatus)
- Planalto slaty antshrike (Thamnophilus pelzelni) (EB)
- Variable antshrike (Thamnophilus caerulescens)
- Amazonian antshrike (Thamnophilus amazonicus)
- Great antshrike (Taraba major)
- Spot-backed antshrike (Hypoedaleus guttatus)
- Band-tailed antbird (Hypocnemoides maculicauda)
- Bananal antbird (Cercomacra ferdinandi) (EB)

== Crescentchests ==
Order: Passeriformes Family: Melanopareiidae

- Collared crescent-chest (Melanopareia torquata)

== Gnateaters ==
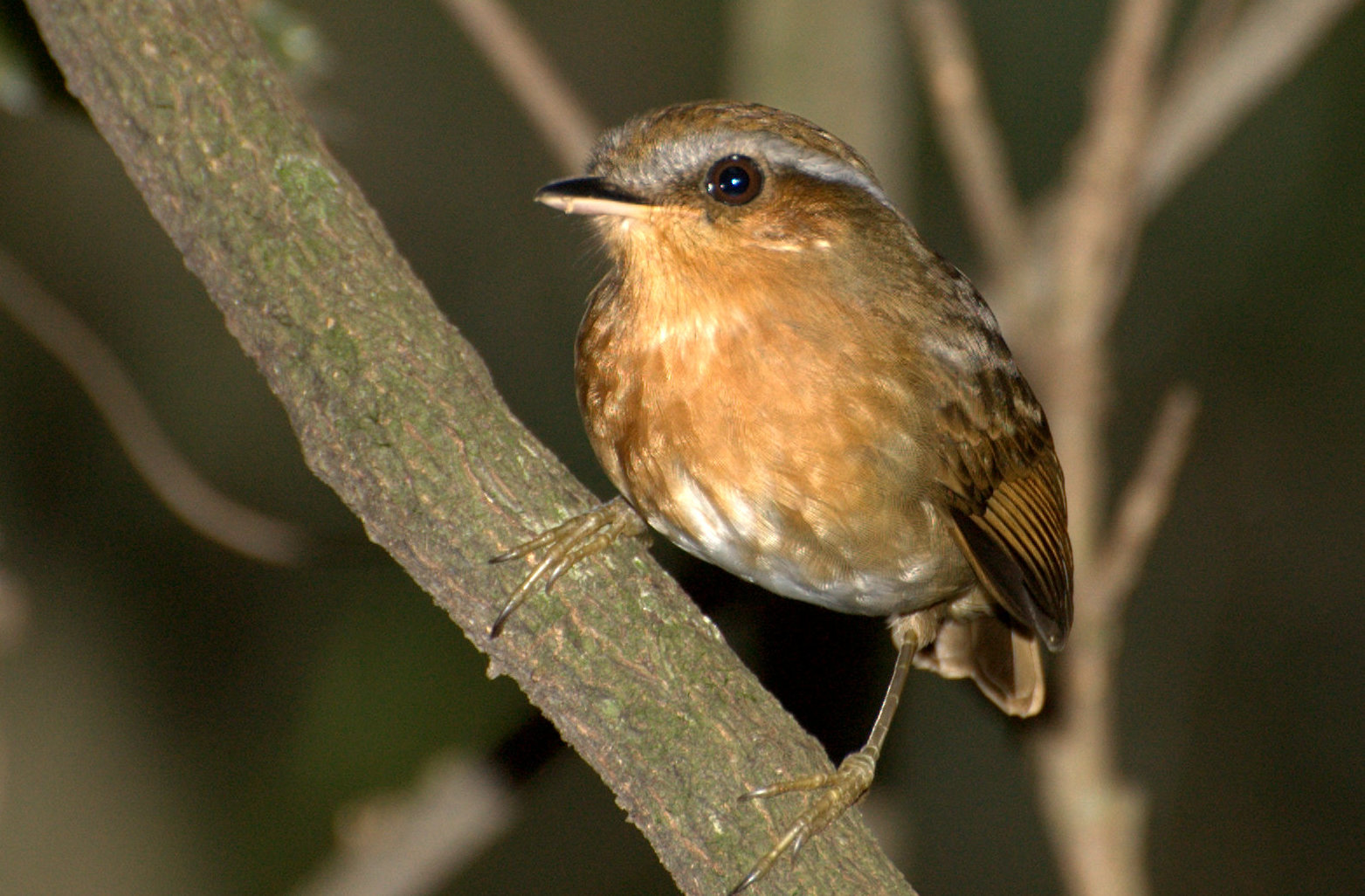
Rufous gnateater

Order: Passeriformes Family: Conopophagidae

- Rufous gnateater (Conopophaga lineata)

== Antpittas ==
Order: Passeriformes Family: Grallariidae

- Variegated antpitta (Grallaria varia)

== Ovenbirds ==
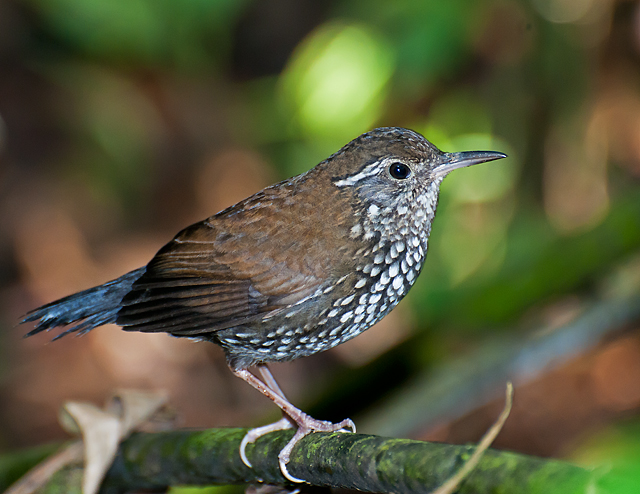
Sharp-tailed streamcreeper

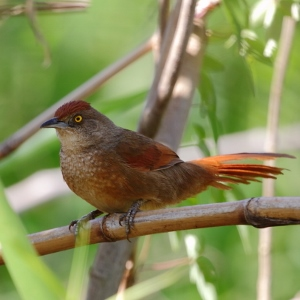
Greater thornbird

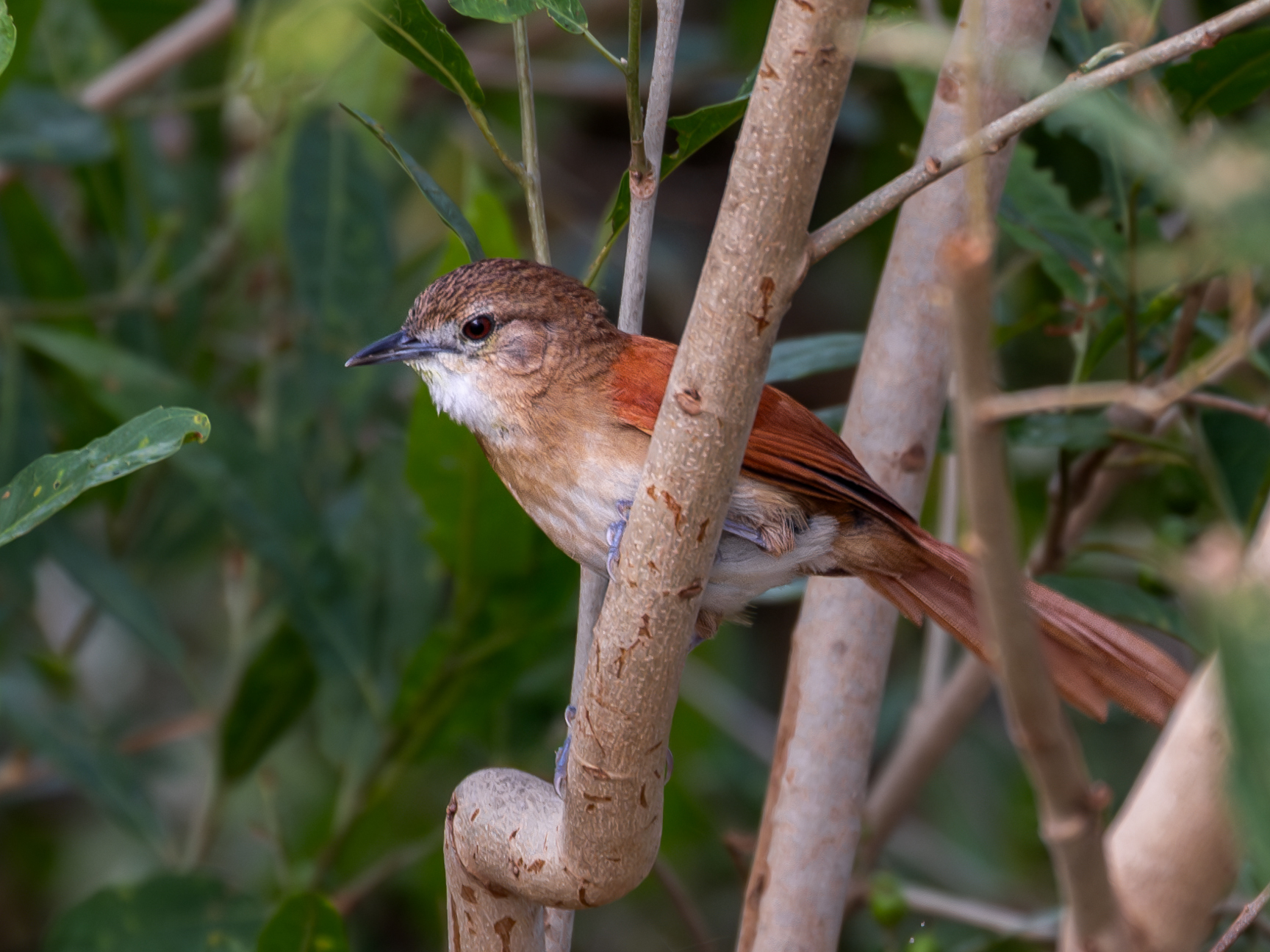
Araguaia spinetail

Order: Passeriformes Family: Furnariidae

- Rufous-breasted leaftosser (Sclerurus scansor)
- Campo miner (Geositta poeciloptera)
- Streaked xenops (Xenops rutilans)
- Point-tailed palmcreeper (Berlepschia rikeri)
- Band-tailed hornero (Furnarius figulus) (EB)
- Pale-legged hornero (Furnarius leucopus)
- Rufous hornero (Furnarius rufus)
- Sharp-tailed streamcreeper (Lochmias nematura)
- Russet-mantled foliage-gleaner (Syndactyla dimidiata)
- Buff-fronted foliage-gleaner (Dendroma rufa)
- Chestnut-capped foliage-gleaner (Clibanornis rectirostris)
- White-eyed foliage-gleaner (Automolus leucophthalmus)
- Rufous-fronted thornbird (Phacellodomus rufifrons)
- Greater thornbird (Phacellodomus ruber)
- Firewood-gatherer (Anumbius annumbi)
- Rusty-backed spinetail (Cranioleuca vulpina)
- Grey-headed spinetail (Cranioleuca semicinerea) (EB)
- Yellow-chinned spinetail (Certhiaxis cinnamomeus)
- Chotoy spinetail (Schoeniophylax phryganophilus)
- Ochre-cheeked spinetail (Synallaxis scutata)
- Araguaia spinetail (Synallaxis simoni) (EB)
- Cinereous-breasted spinetail (Synallaxis hypospodia)
- Spix's spinetail (Synallaxis spixi) (A)
- Pale-breasted spinetail (Synallaxis albescens)
- Sooty-fronted spinetail (Synallaxis frontalis)

== Woodcreepers ==
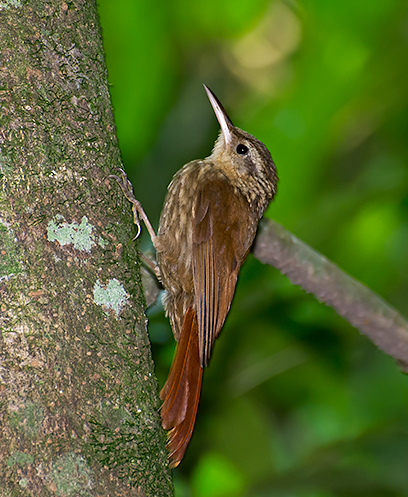
Lesser woodcreeper

Order: Passeriformes Family: Dendrocolaptidae

- Olivaceous woodcreeper (Sittasomus griseicapillus)
- Planalto woodcreeper (Dendrocolaptes platyrostris)
- White-throated woodcreeper (Xiphocolaptes albicollis)
- Lesser woodcreeper (Xiphorhynchus fuscus)
- Buff-throated woodcreeper (Xiphorhynchus guttatus)
- Straight-billed woodcreeper (Dendroplex picus)
- Red-billed scythebill (Campylorhamphus trochilirostris)
- Narrow-billed woodcreeper (Lepidocolaptes angustirostris)

== Vireos and allies ==
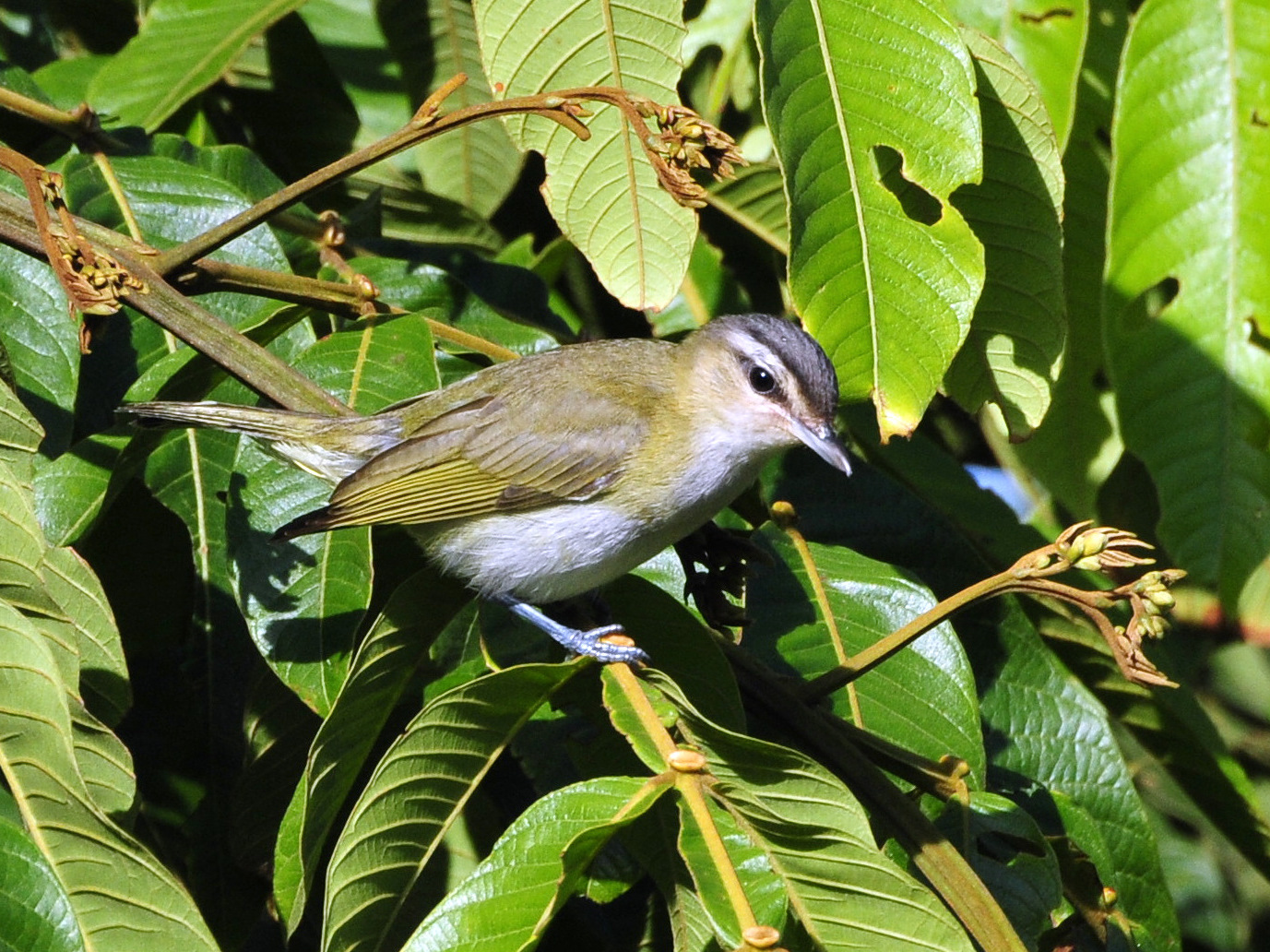
Chivi vireo

Order: Passeriformes Family: Vireonidae

- Rufous-browed peppershrike (Cyclarhis gujanensis)
- Ashy-headed greenlet (Hylophilus pectoralis)
- Red-eyed vireo (Vireo olivaceus)
- Chivi vireo (Vireo chivi)

== Crows, jays, and allies ==
Order: Passeriformes Family: Corvidae

- Curl-crested jay (Cyanocorax cristatellus)
- White-naped jay (Cyanocorax cyanopogon) (EB)

== Estrildid finches ==
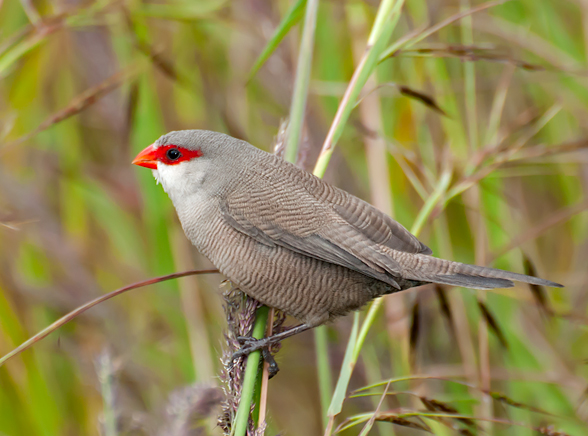
Common waxbill

Order: Passeriformes Family: Estrildidae

- Common waxbill (Estrilda astrild) (I)

== Old World sparrows ==
Order: Passeriformes Family: Passeridae

- House sparrow (Passer domesticus) (I)

== Pipits ==
Order: Passeriformes Family: Motacillidae

- Yellowish pipit (Anthus chii)

== Finches and Euphonias ==
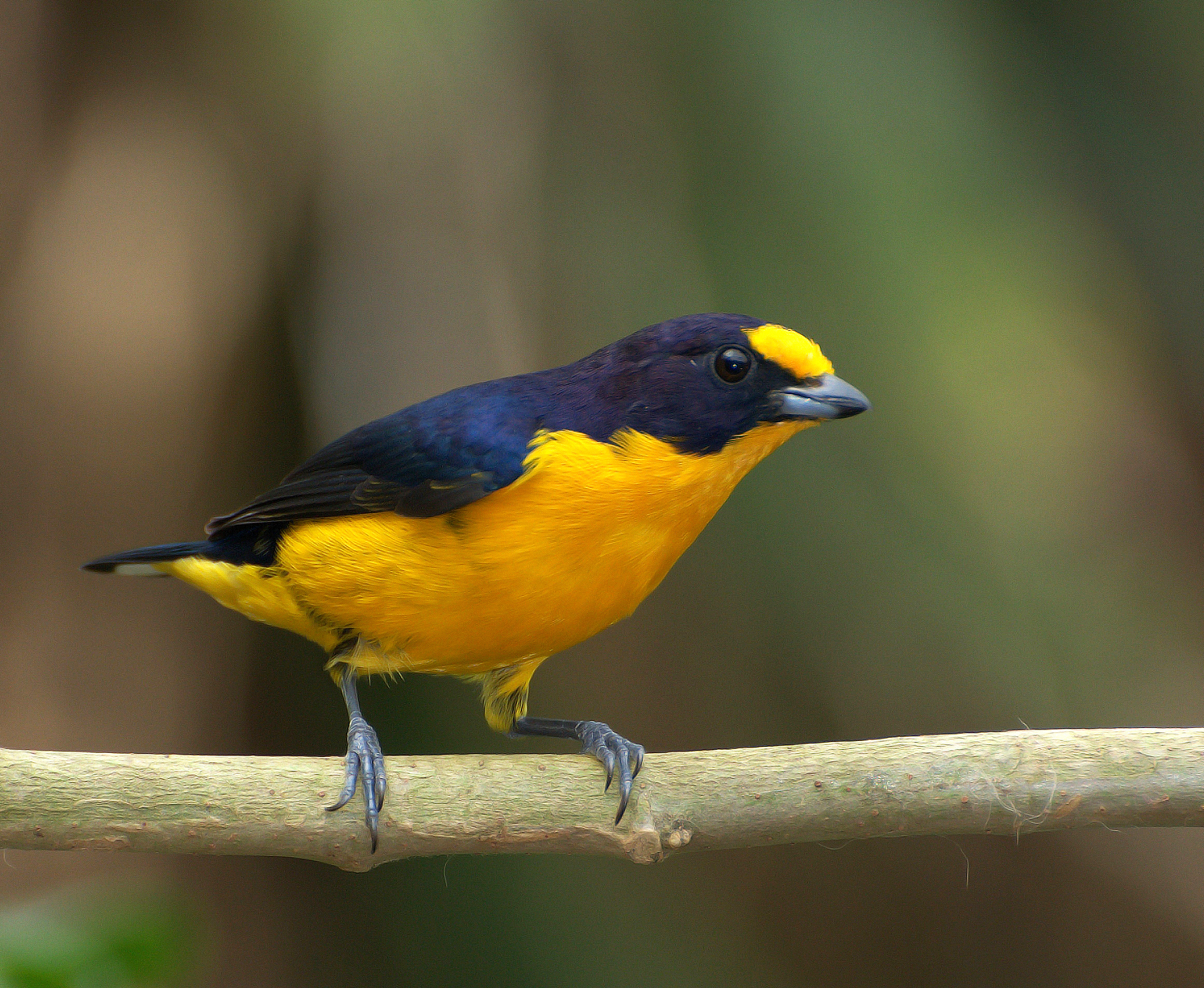
Violaceous euphonia

Order: Passeriformes Family: Fringillidae

- Hooded siskin (Spinus magellanicus)
- Golden-rumped euphonia (Chlorophonia cyanocephala)
- Purple-throated euphonia (Euphonia chlorotica)
- Violaceous euphonia (Euphonia violacea)
- Thick-billed euphonia (Euphonia laniirostris)

== New World sparrows ==
Order: Passeriformes Family: Passerellidae

- Grassland sparrow (Ammodramus humeralis)
- Yellow-browed sparrow (Ammodramus aurifrons)
- Pectoral sparrow (Arremon taciturnus)
- Saffron-billed sparrow (Arremon flavirostris)
- Rufous-collared sparrow (Zonotrichia capensis)

== New World warblers ==
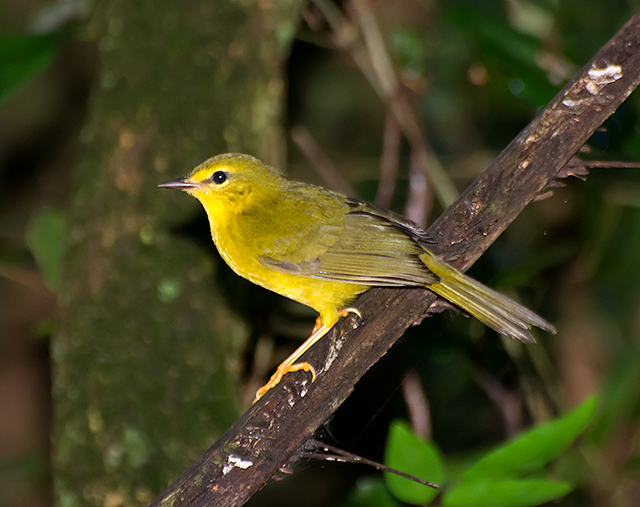
Flavescent warbler

Order: Passeriformes Family: Parulidae

- Masked yellowthroat (Geothlypis aequinoctialis)
- Tropical parula (Setophaga pitiayumi)
- White-striped warbler (Myiothlypis leucophrys) (EB)
- Flavescent warbler (Myiothlypis flaveola)
- Golden-crowned warbler (Basileuterus culicivorus)

== Icterids ==
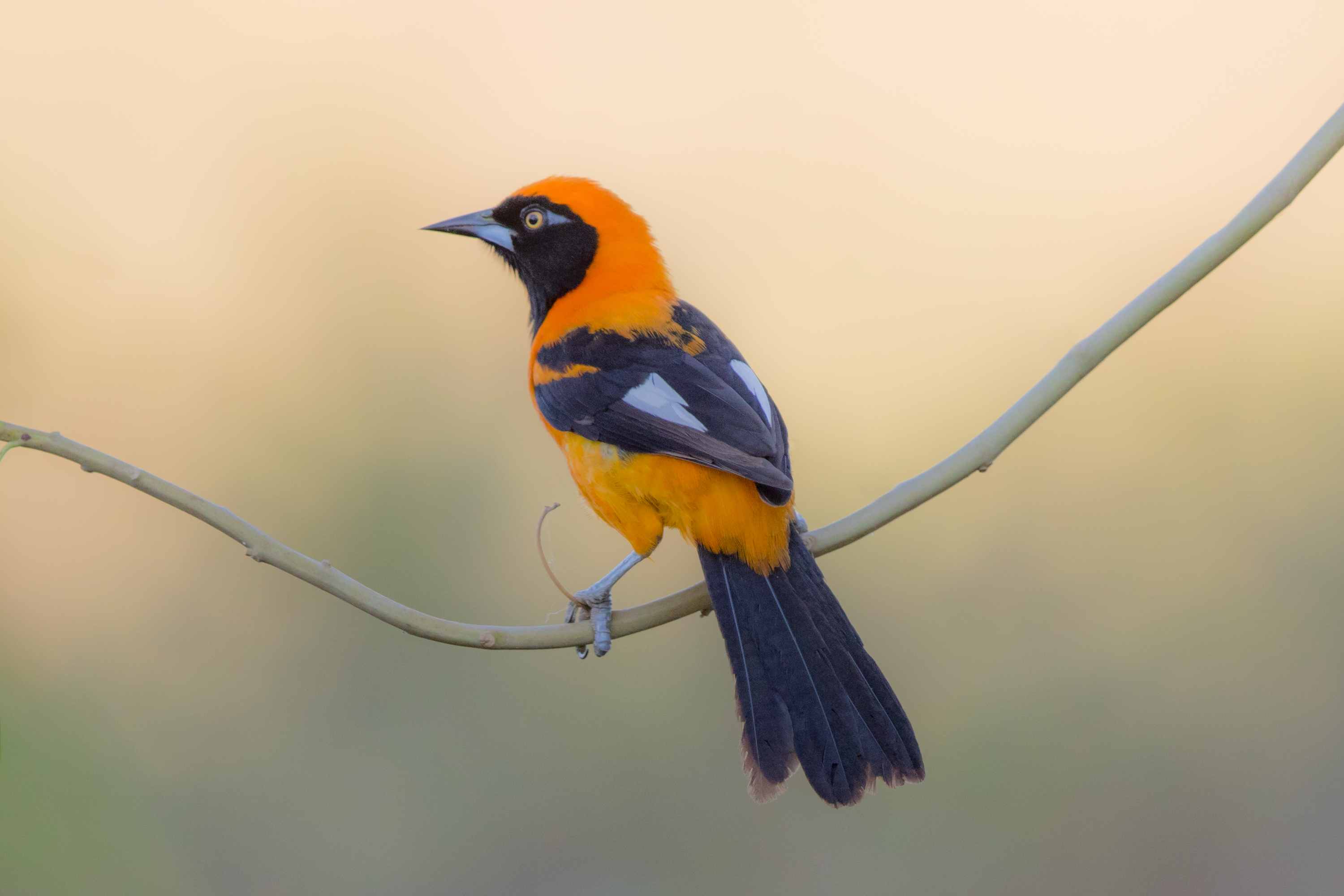
Orange-backed troupial

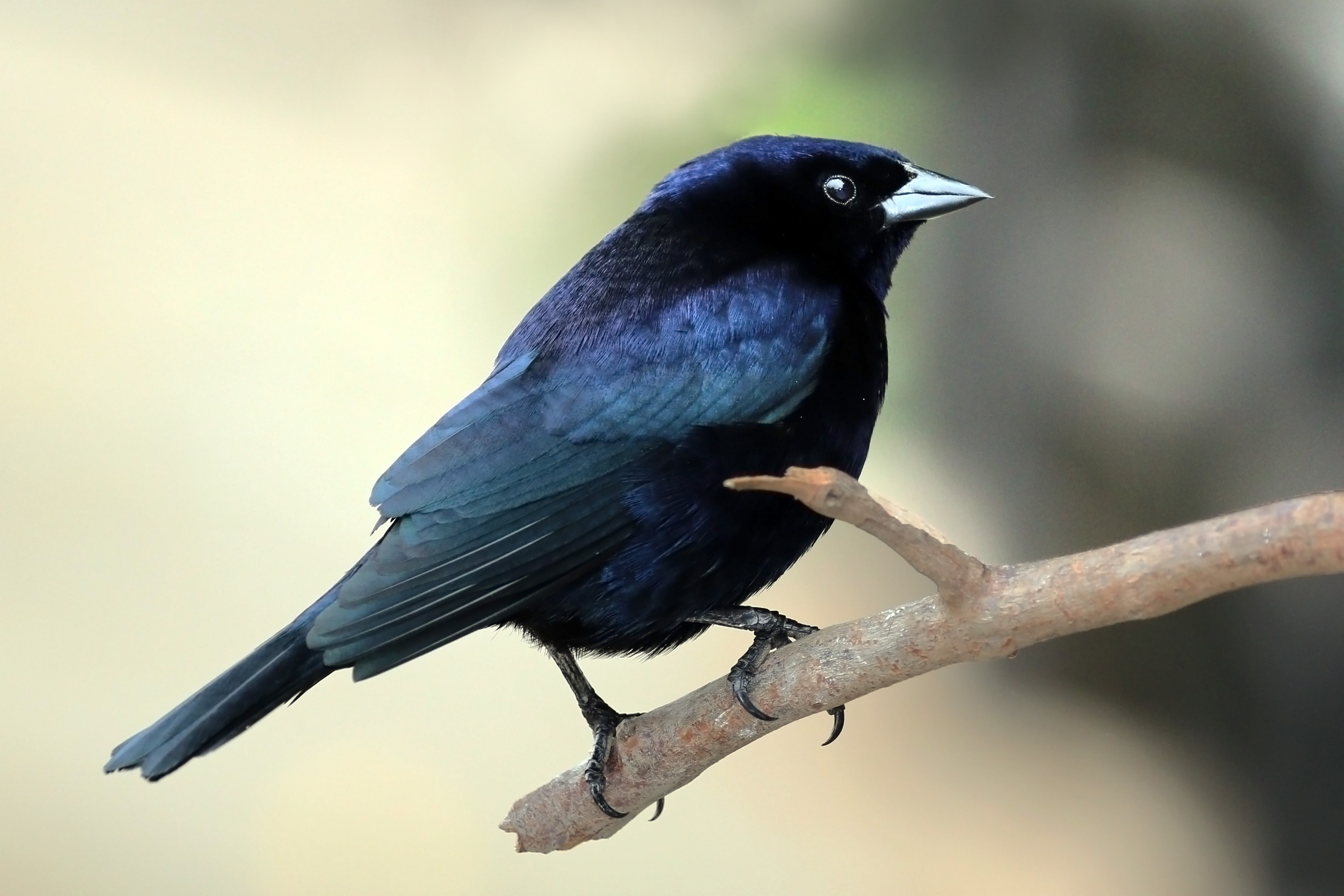
Shiny cowbird

Order: Passeriformes Family: Icteridae

- Bobolink (Dolichonyx oryzivorus) (A)
- White-browed meadowlark (Leistes superciliaris)
- Crested oropendola (Psarocolius decumanus)
- Solitary cacique (Cacicus solitarius)
- Yellow-rumped cacique (Cacicus cela)
- Red-rumped cacique (Cacicus haemorrhous)
- Orange-backed troupial (Icterus croconotus)
- Campo troupial (Icterus jamacaii) (EB)
- Variable oriole (Icterus pyrrhopterus)
- Epaulet oriole (Icterus cayanensis)
- Screaming cowbird (Molothrus rufoaxillaris)
- Giant cowbird (Molothrus oryzivorus)
- Shiny cowbird (Molothrus bonariensis)
- Chopi blackbird (Gnorimopsar chopi)
- Unicolored blackbird (Agelasticus cyanopus)
- Chestnut-capped blackbird (Chrysomus ruficapillus)
- Yellow-rumped marshbird (Pseudoleistes guirahuro)

== Cardinals, grosbeaks, and allies ==
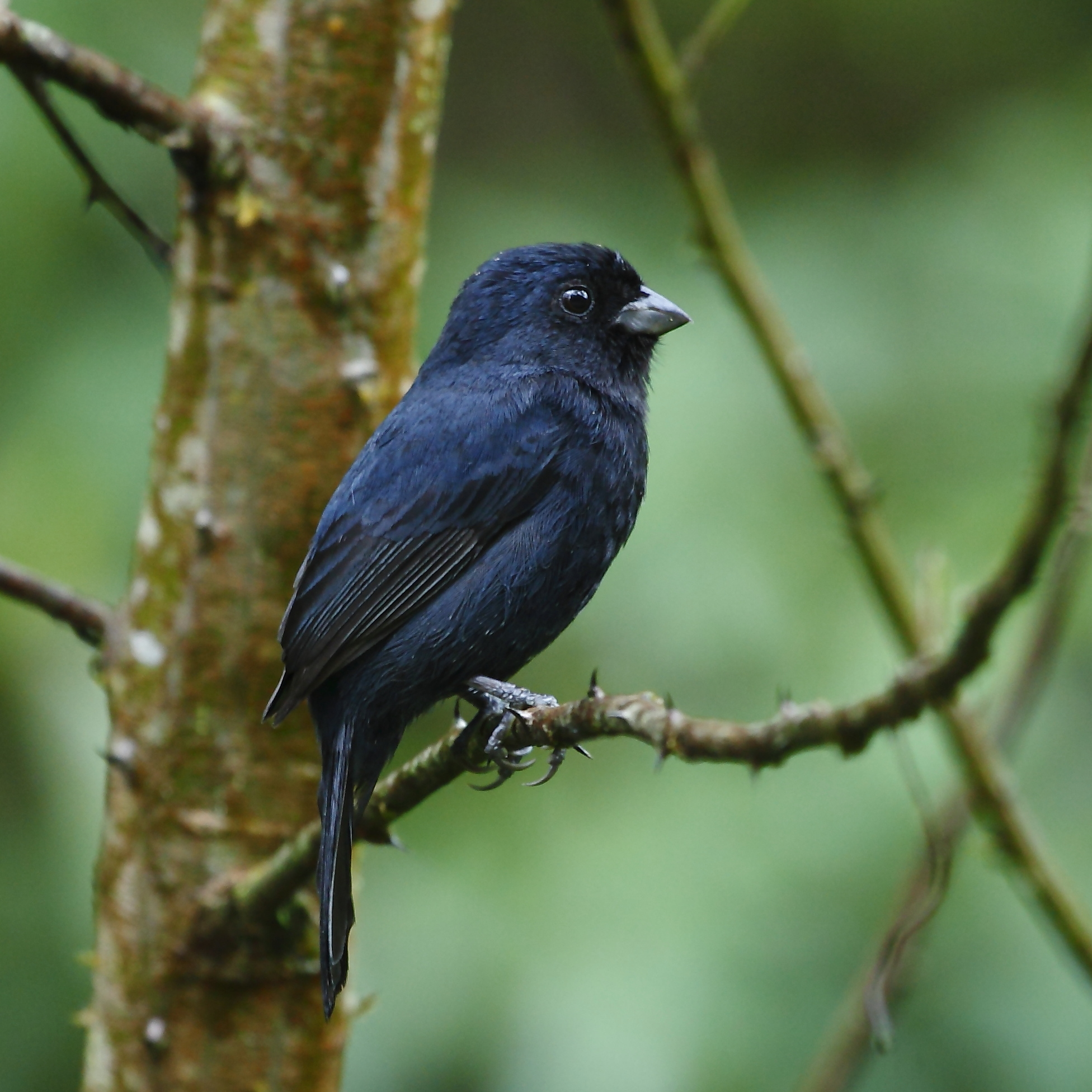
Blackish-blue seedeater

Order: Passeriformes Family: Cardinalidae

- Black-backed grosbeak (Pheucticus aureoventris) (A)
- Hepatic tanager (Piranga flava)
- Rose-breasted chat (Granatellus pelzelni)
- Blackish-blue seedeater (Amaurospiza moesta)
- Glaucous-blue grosbeak (Cyanoloxia glaucocaerulea)
- Ultramarine grosbeak (Cyanoloxia brissonii)

== South American tanagers ==
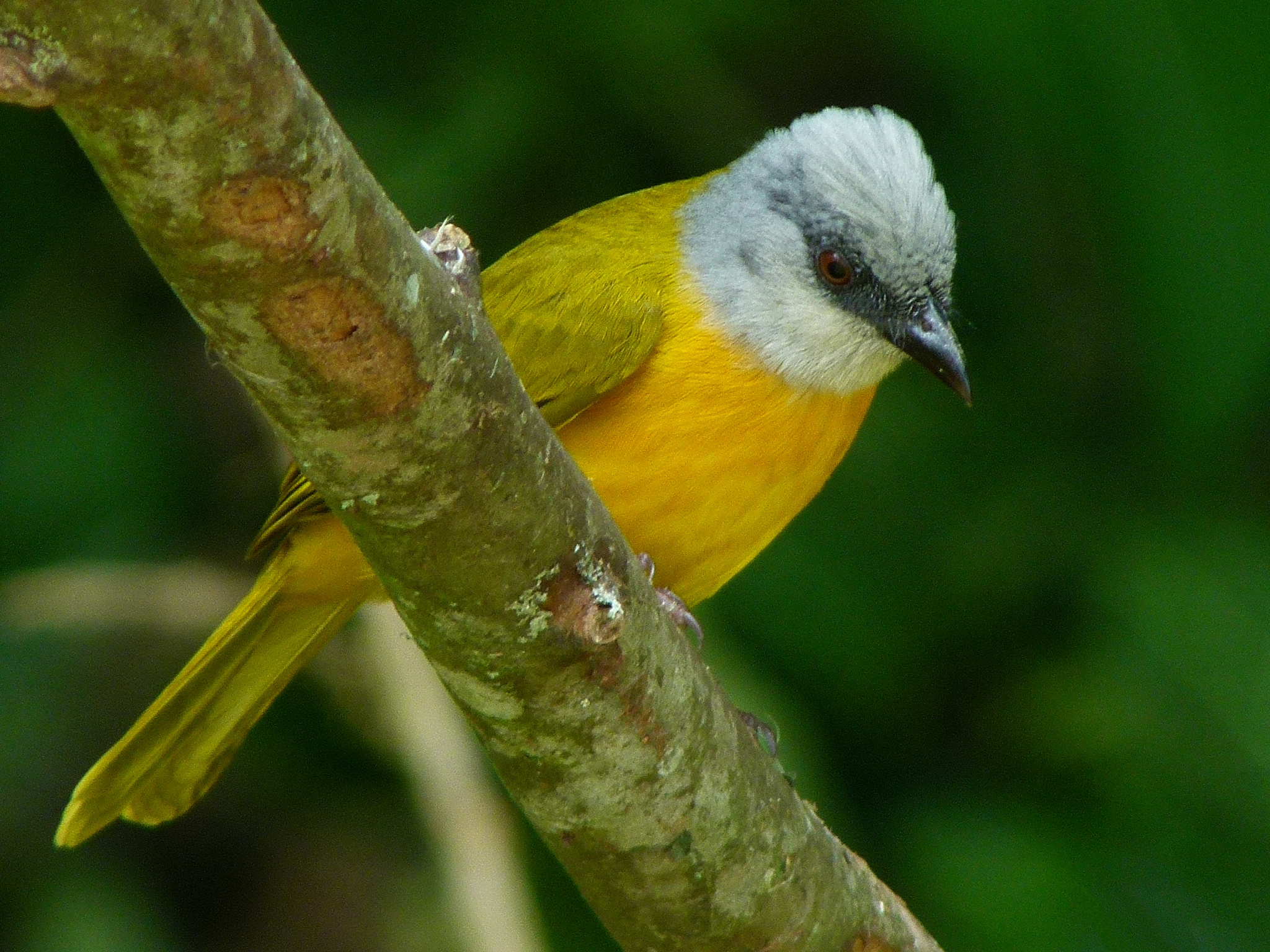
Grey-headed tanager

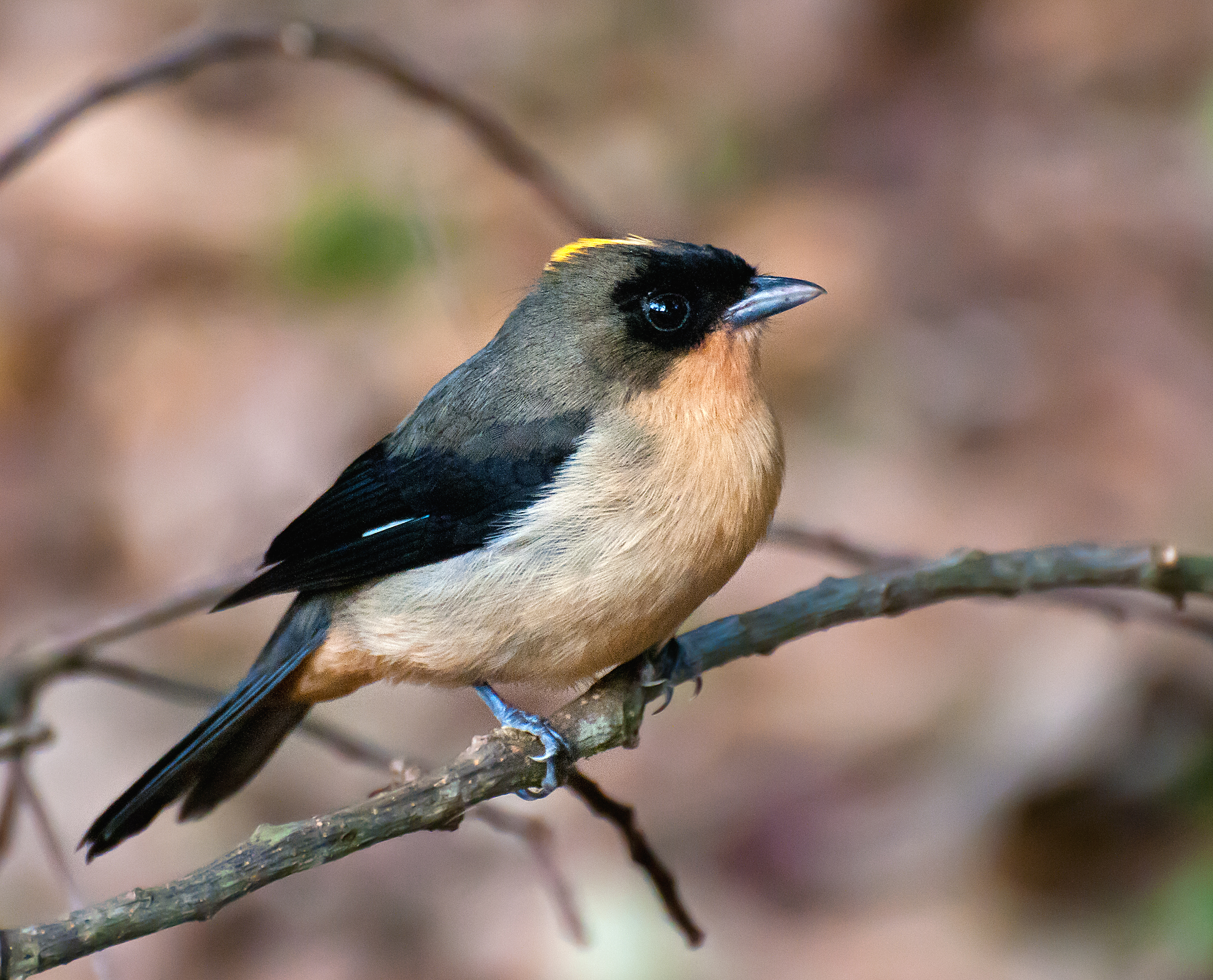
Black-goggled tanager

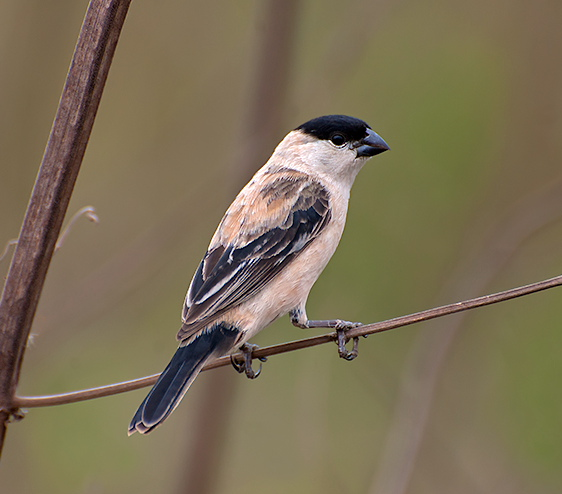
Pearly-bellied seedeater

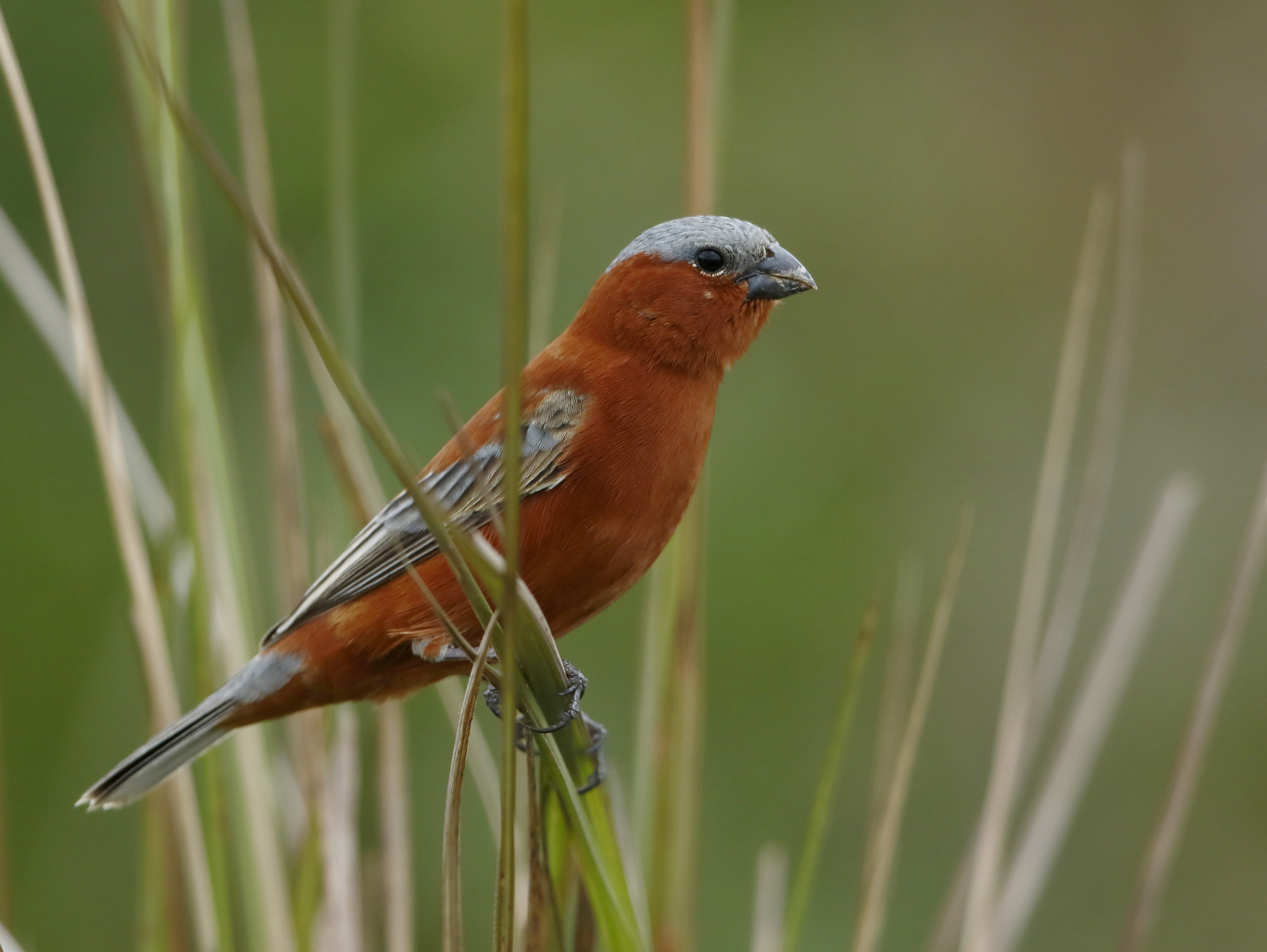
Chestnut seedeater

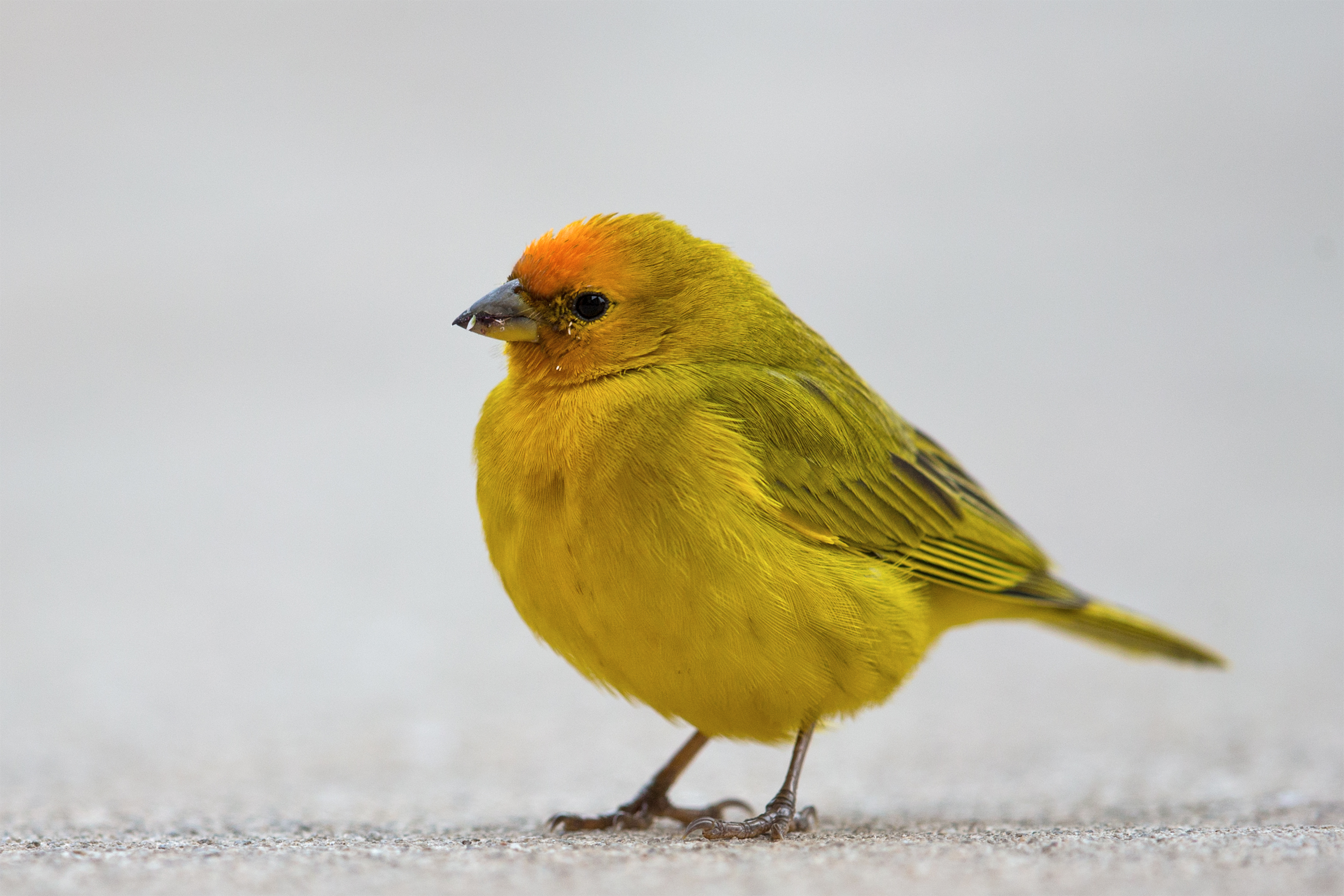
Orange-fronted yellow finch

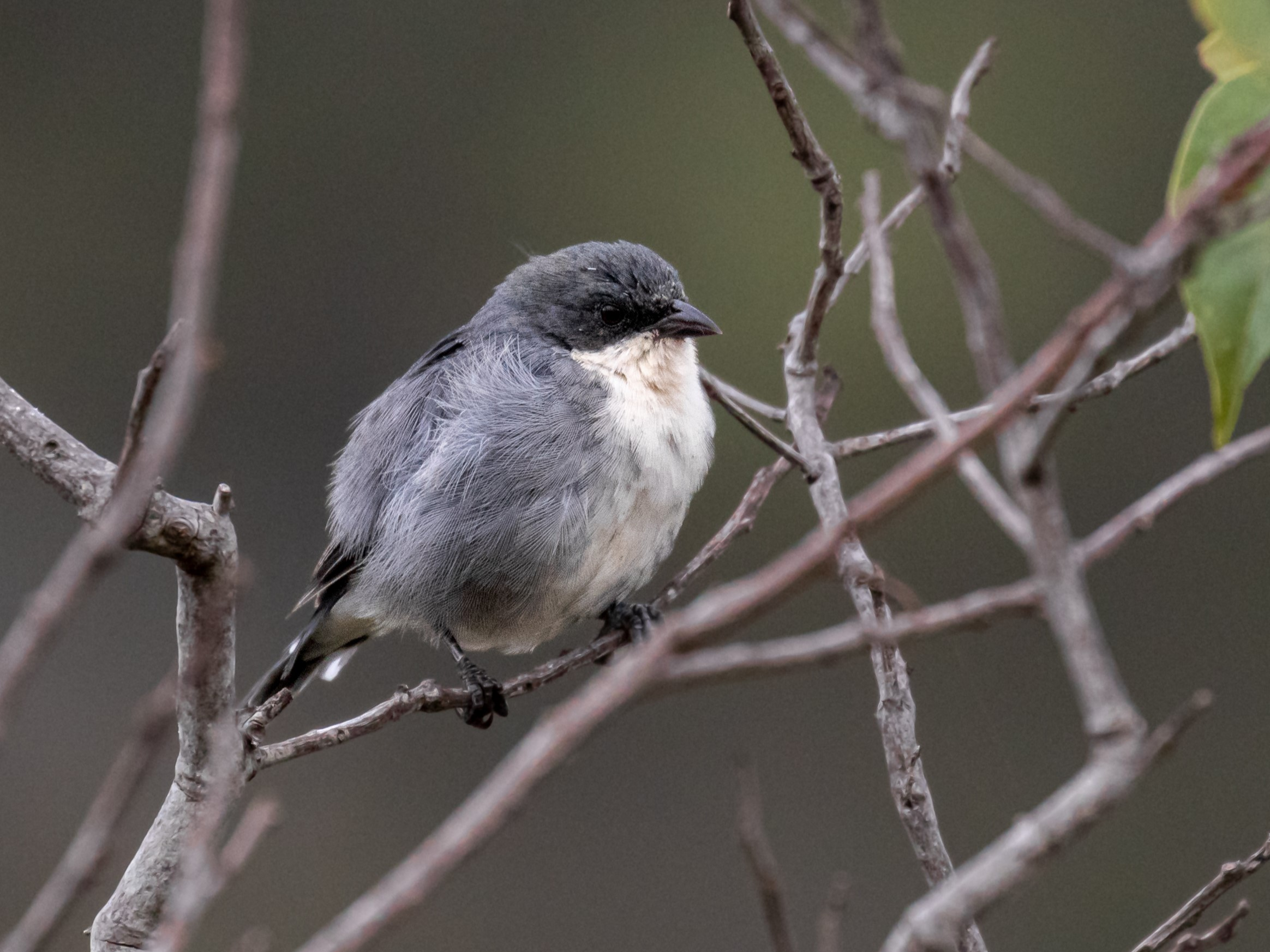
Cinereous warbling finch

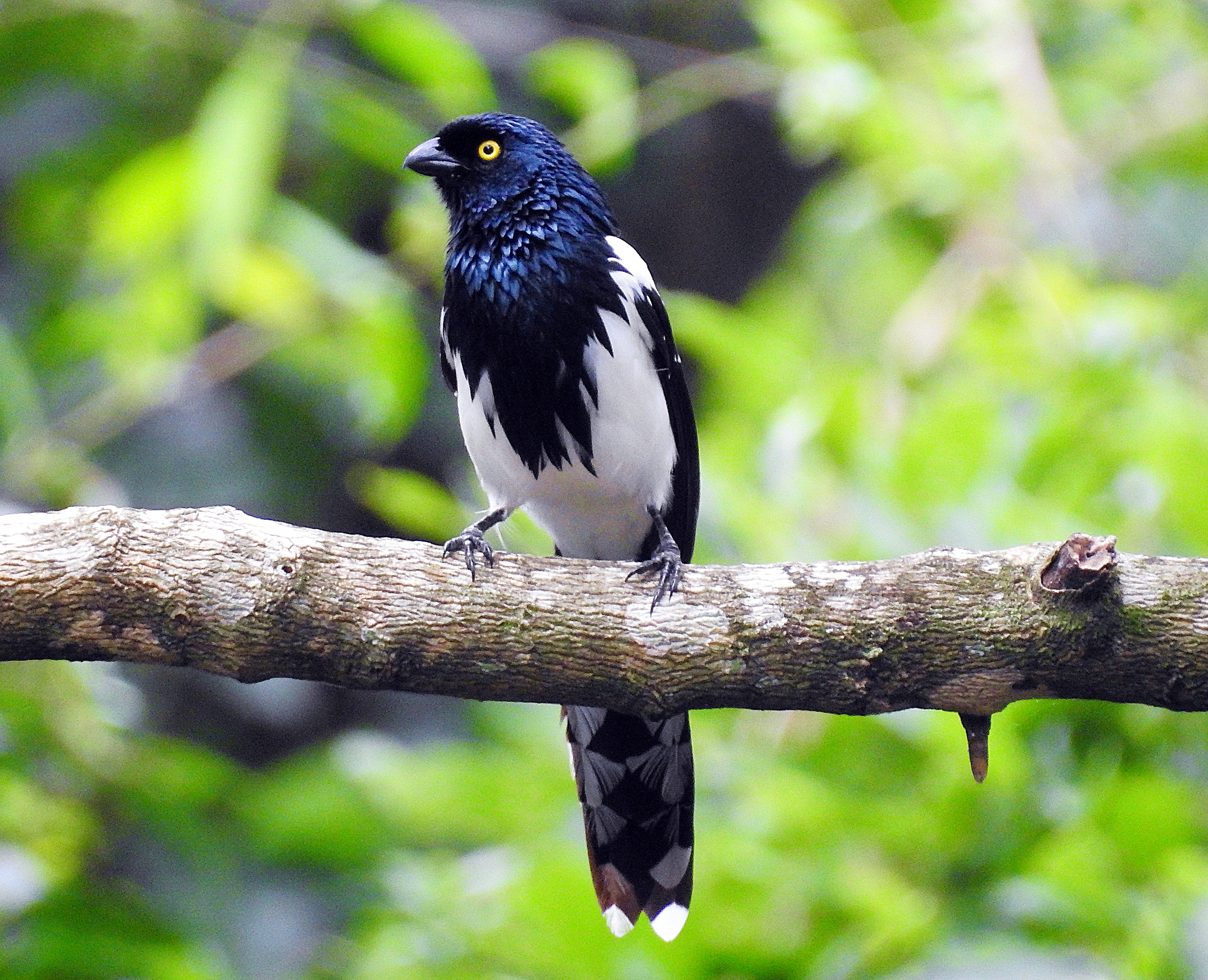
Magpie tanager

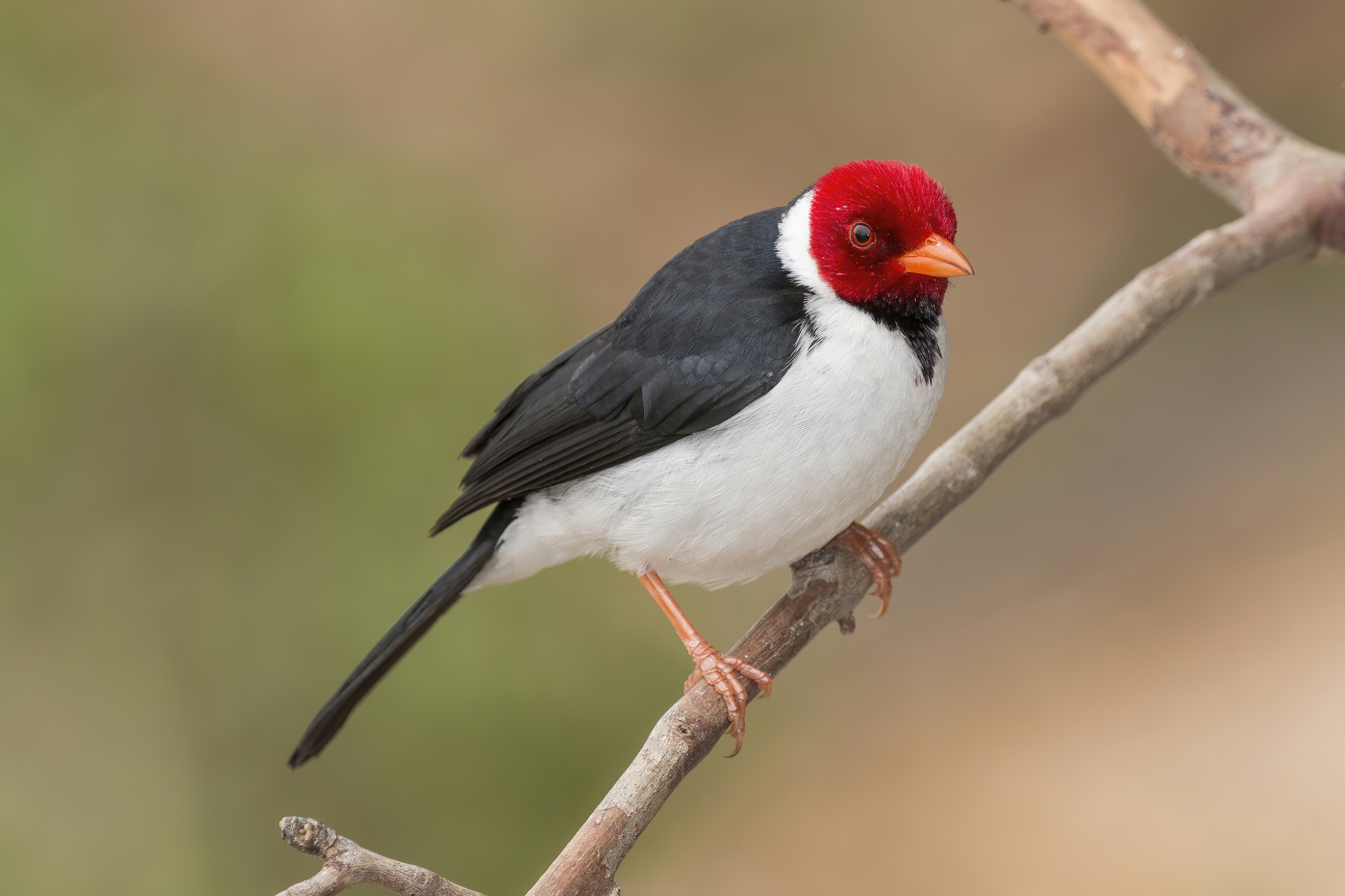
Yellow-billed cardinal

Order: Passeriformes Family: Thraupidae

- Coal-crested finch (Charitospiza eucosma)
- Hooded tanager (Nemosia pileata)
- Scarlet-throated tanager (Compsothraupis loricata) (EB)
- Black-masked finch (Coryphaspiza melanotis)
- Wedge-tailed grass finch (Emberizoides herbicola)
- Lesser grass finch (Emberizoides ypiranganus)
- Blue finch (Rhopospina caerulescens)
- Guira tanager (Hemithraupis guira)
- Swallow tanager (Tersina viridis)
- Red-legged honeycreeper (Cyanerpes cyaneus)
- Blue dacnis (Dacnis cayana)
- Black-throated saltator (Saltatricula atricollis)
- Buff-throated saltator (Saltator maximus)
- Bluish-grey saltator (Saltator coerulescens)
- Green-winged saltator (Saltator similis)
- Bananaquit (Coereba flaveola)
- Sooty grassquit (Asemospiza fuliginosa)
- Blue-black grassquit (Volatinia jacarina)
- Cone-billed tanager (Conothraupis mesoleuca) (EB)
- Grey-headed tanager (Eucometis penicillata)
- Black-goggled tanager (Trichothraupis melanops)
- Flame-crested tanager (Loriotus cristatus)
- Pileated finch (Coryphospingus pileatus)
- Red-crested finch (Coryphospingus cucullatus)
- White-lined tanager (Tachyphonus rufus)
- Silver-beaked tanager (Ramphocelus carbo)
- Lined seedeater (Sporophila lineola)
- Plumbeous seedeater (Sporophila plumbea)
- Rusty-collared seedeater (Sporophila collaris)
- Yellow-bellied seedeater (Sporophila nigricollis)
- Dubois's seedeater (Sporophila ardesiaca) (EB)
- Double-collared seedeater (Sporophila caerulescens)
- White-throated seedeater (Sporophila albogularis) (EB)
- White-bellied seedeater (Sporophila leucoptera)
- Copper seedeater (Sporophila bouvreuil)
- Pearly-bellied seedeater (Sporophila pileata)
- Tawny-bellied seedeater (Sporophila hypoxantha)
- Dark-throated seedeater (Sporophila ruficollis)
- Marsh seedeater (Sporophila palustris)
- Rufous-rumped seedeater (Sporophila hypochroma)
- Chestnut seedeater (Sporophila cinnamomea)
- Black-bellied seedeater (Sporophila melanogaster) (EB)
- Chestnut-bellied seed-finch (Sporophila angolensis)
- Great-billed seed-finch (Sporophila maximiliani)
- Orange-headed tanager (Thlypopsis sordida)
- Chestnut-headed tanager (Thlypopsis pyrrhocoma)
- White-rumped tanager (Cypsnagra hirundinacea)
- Cinereous warbling finch (Microspingus cinereus) (EB)
- Chestnut-vented conebill (Conirostrum speciosum)
- Stripe-tailed yellow finch (Sicalis citrina)
- Saffron finch (Sicalis flaveola)
- Orange-fronted yellow finch (Sicalis columbiana)
- Grassland yellow finch (Sicalis luteola)
- Uniform finch (Haplospiza unicolor)
- Fawn-breasted tanager (Pipraeidea melanonota)
- Shrike-like tanager (Neothraupis fasciata)
- Magpie tanager (Cissopis leverianus)
- Black-faced tanager (Schistochlamys melanopis)
- Cinnamon tanager (Schistochlamys ruficapillus) (EB)
- Red-cowled cardinal (Paroaria dominicana) (EB)
- Crimson-fronted cardinal (Paroaria baeri)
- Yellow-billed cardinal (Paroaria capitata)
- Blue-grey tanager (Thraupis episcopus)
- Sayaca tanager (Thraupis sayaca)
- Palm tanager (Thraupis palmarum)
- Blue-necked tanager (Stilpnia cyanicollis)
- Burnished-buff tanager (Stilpnia cayana)

== Donacobiuses ==
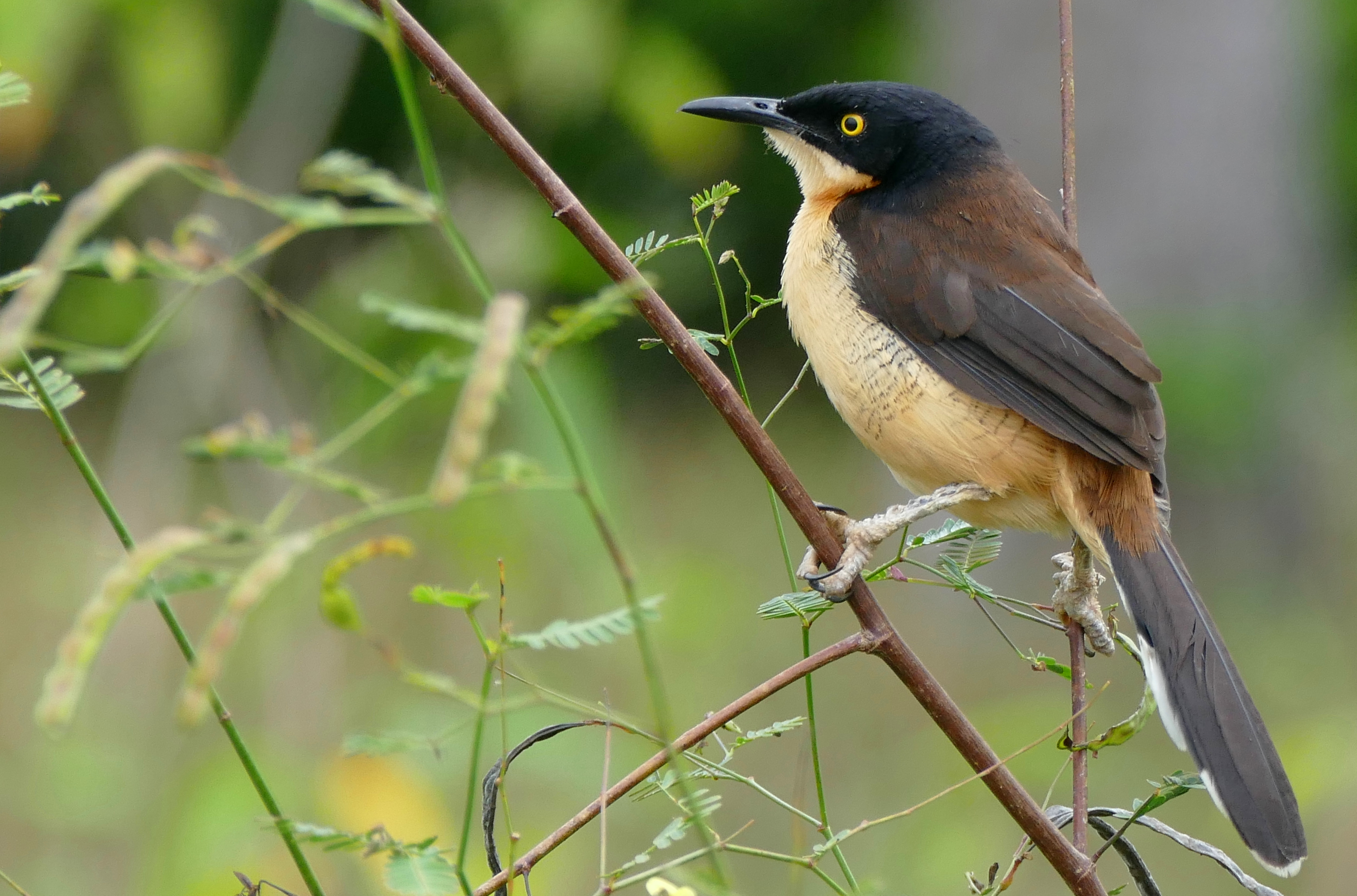
Black-capped donacobius

Order: Passeriformes Family: Donacobiidae

- Black-capped donacobius (Donacobius atricapilla)

== Swallows and martins ==
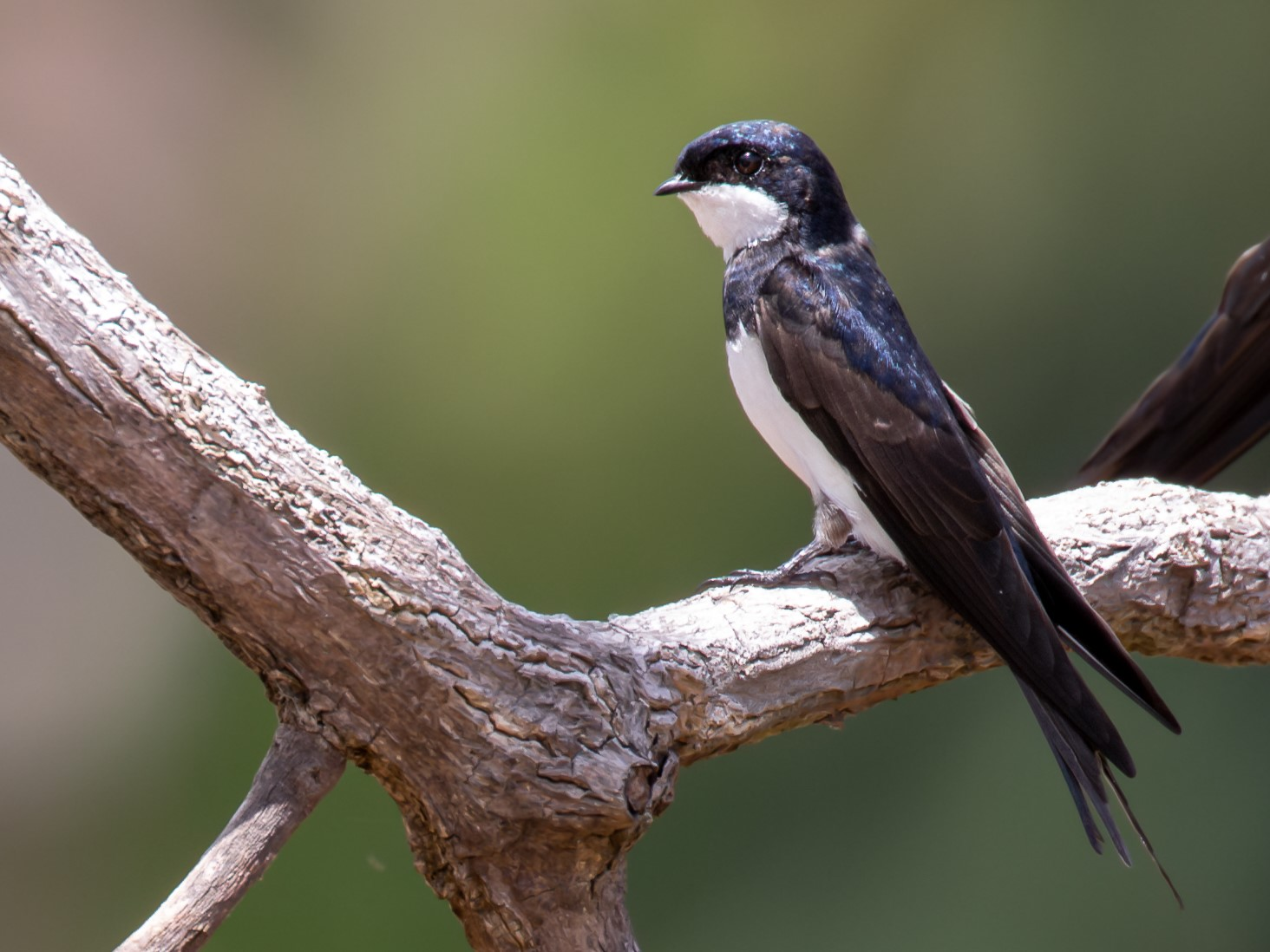
Black-collared swallow

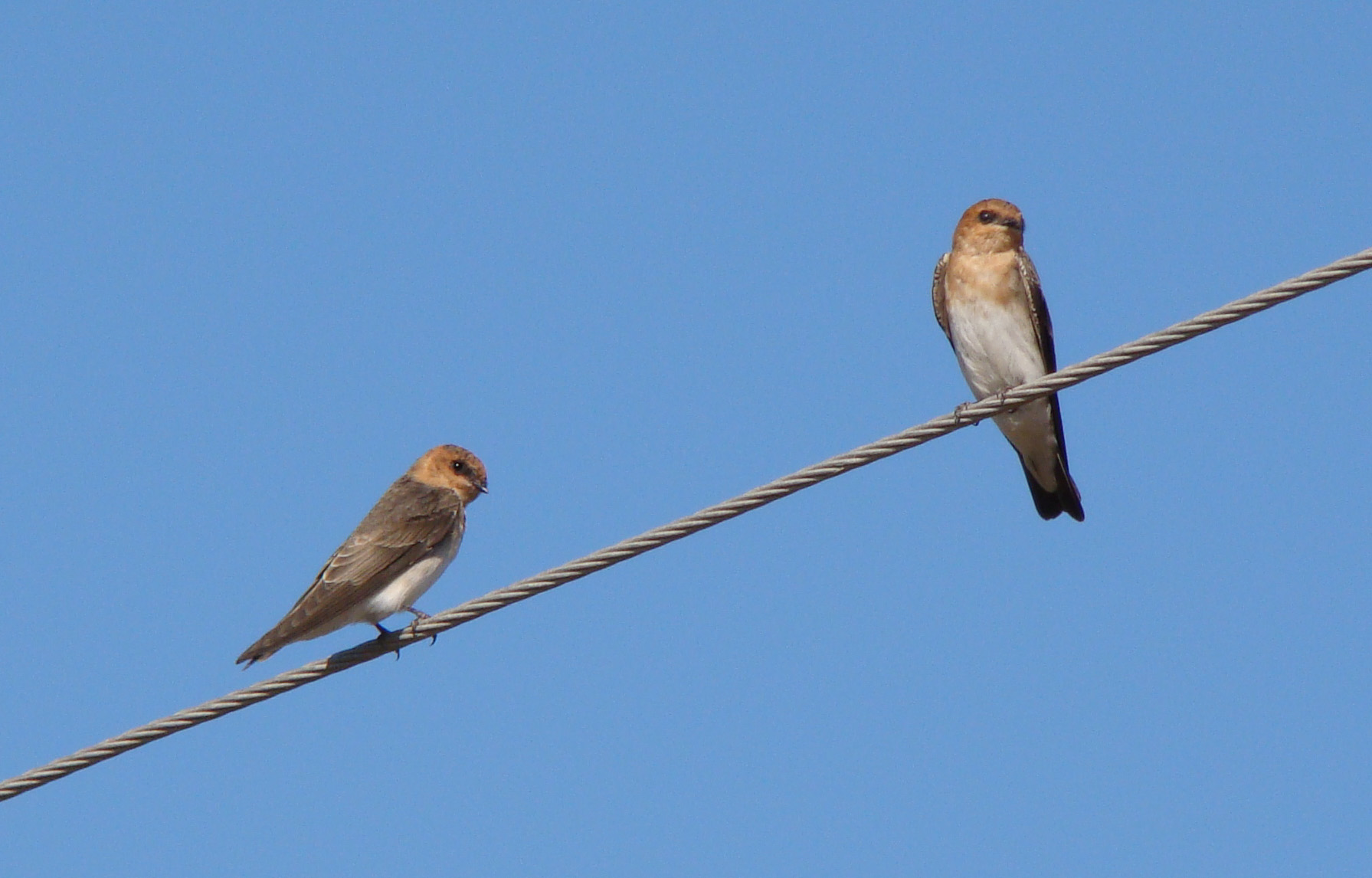
Tawny-headed swallow

Order: Passeriformes Family: Hirundinidae

- Blue-and-white swallow (Pygochelidon cyanoleuca)
- Black-collared swallow (Pygochelidon melanoleuca)
- Tawny-headed swallow (Alopochelidon fucata)
- Southern rough-winged swallow (Stelgidopteryx ruficollis)
- Brown-chested martin (Progne tapera)
- Purple martin (Progne subis)
- Grey-breasted martin (Progne chalybea)
- White-winged swallow (Tachycineta albiventer)
- White-rumped swallow (Tachycineta leucorrhoa)
- Chilean swallow (Tachycineta leucopyga) (A)
- Bank swallow (Riparia riparia)
- Barn swallow (Hirundo rustica)
- Cliff swallow (Petrochelidon pyrrhonota)

== Wrens ==
Order: Passeriformes Family: Troglodytidae

- Southern house wren (Troglodytes musculus)
- Grass wren (Cistothorus platensis)
- Moustached wren (Pheugopedius genibarbis)
- Buff-breasted wren (Cantorchilus leucotis)

== Gnatcatchers and gnatwrens ==
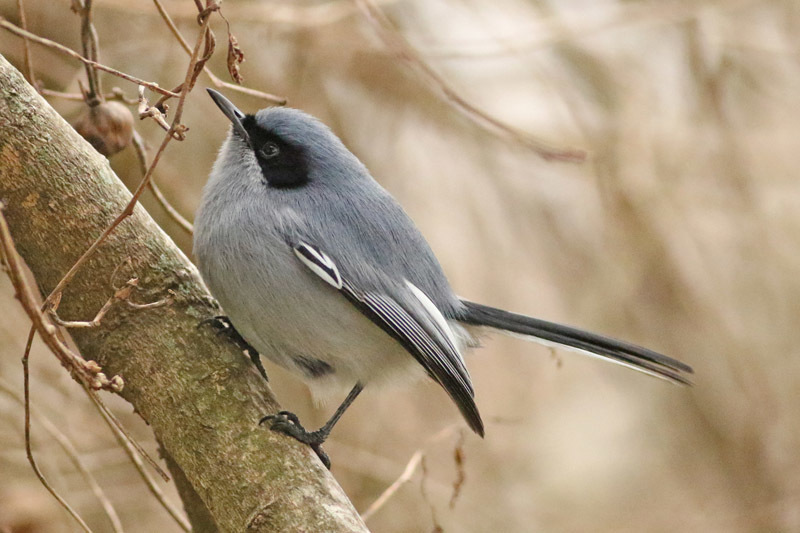
Masked gnatcatcher

Order: Passeriformes Family: Polioptilidae

- Masked gnatcatcher (Polioptila dumicola)
- Long-billed gnatwren (Ramphocaenus melanurus)

== Mockingbirds, thrashers, and allies ==
Order: Passeriformes Family: Mimidae

- Chalk-browed mockingbird (Mimus saturninus)
- White-banded mockingbird (Mimus triurus) (A)

== Thrushes ==
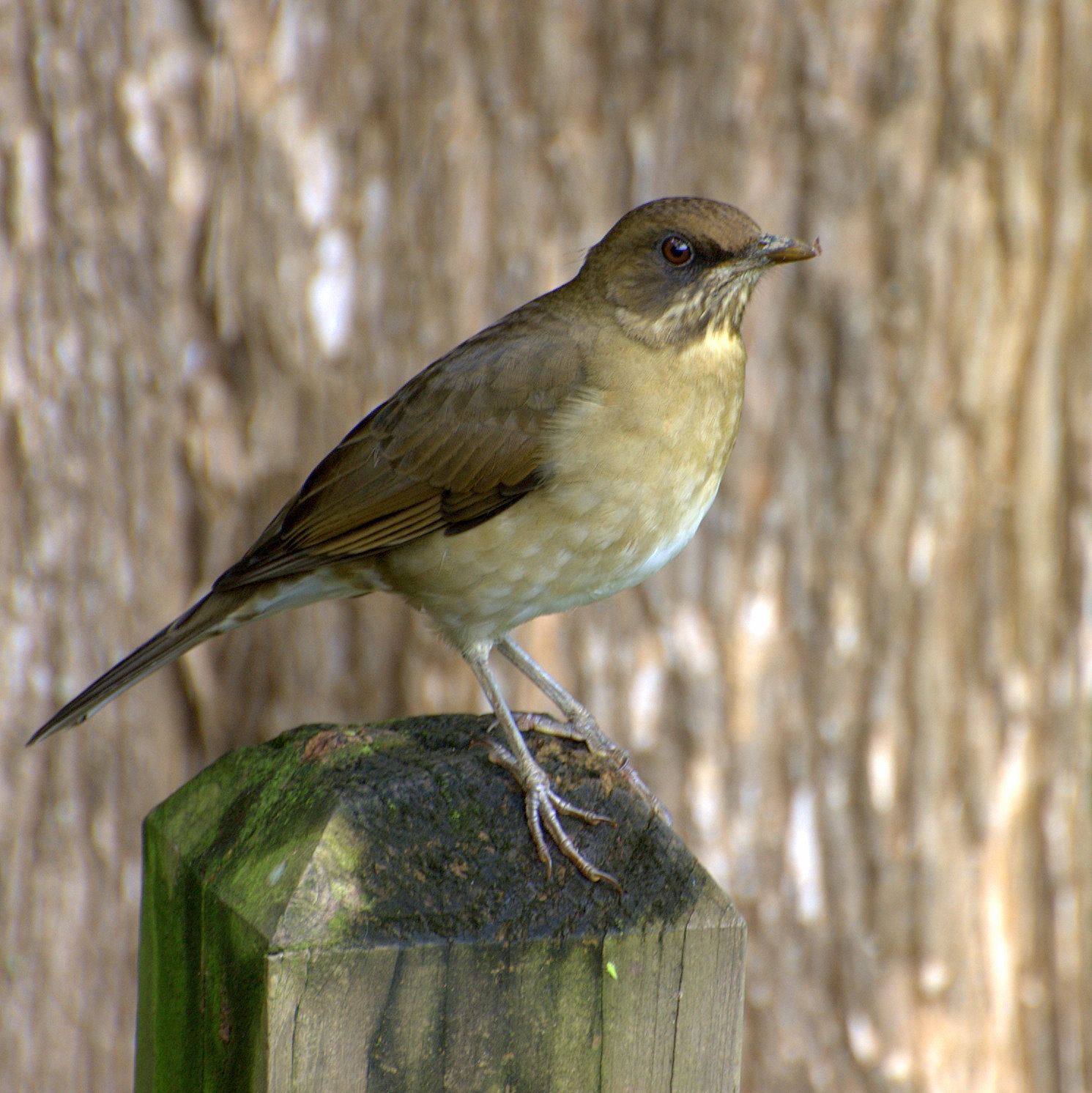
Creamy-bellied thrush

Order: Passeriformes Family: Turdidae

- Veery (Catharus fuscescens)
- Pale-breasted thrush (Turdus leucomelas)
- Hauxwell's thrush (Turdus hauxwelli)
- Rufous-bellied thrush (Turdus rufiventris)
- Creamy-bellied thrush (Turdus amaurochalinus)
- Blacksmith thrush (Turdus subalaris)
- White-necked thrush (Turdus albicollis)
