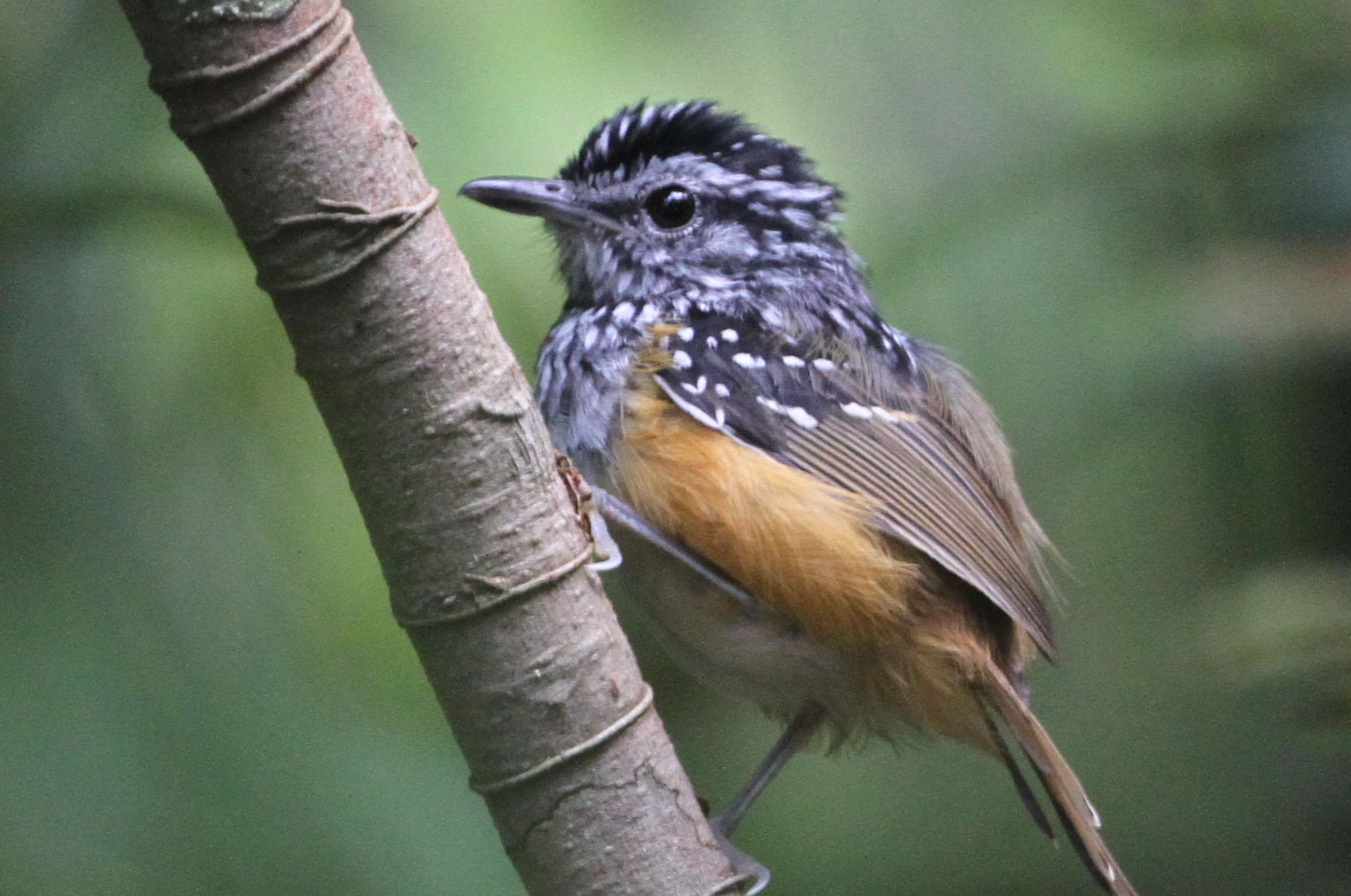
- at Machadinho d'Oeste, State of Rondônia, Brazil

Conservation status
- Least Concern (IUCN 3.1)

Scientific classification
- Kingdom: Animalia
- Phylum: Chordata
- Class: Aves
- Order: Passeriformes
- Family: Thamnophilidae
- Genus: Hypocnemis
- Species: H. rondoni

Binomial name
- Hypocnemis rondoni Whitney et al., 2013

= Manicoré warbling antbird =

Manicore warbling antbird

Species of bird in Brazil

The Manicore warbling antbird (Note: The IOC spells the English name with no diacritics. Some authors spell it Manicoré. Here, the IOC spelling is used.) or Manicore antwarbler, (Hypocnemis rondoni) is a species of insectivorous bird in subfamily Thamnophilinae of family Thamnophilidae, the "typical antbirds". It is endemic to Brazil.

== Taxonomy and systematics ==
The Manicore warbling antbird was first described in 2013. It had been recognized some years earlier and tentatively treated as a subspecies of the then warbling antbird Hypocnemis cantator sensu lato. A 2007 publication resulted in a split of the warbling antbird into several species, and the new, as yet undescribed, taxon was assigned as a subspecies of Spix's warbling antbird (H. striata). The 2013 paper resolved its identity as a species. The species' English name refers to the town of Manicoré near which it was first recognized.

The Manicore warbling antbird is monotypic.

== Description ==
The Manicore warbling antbird is about 11 cm (4.3 in) long and weighs about 12.5 g (0.44 oz). Adult males have a black crown with a white central streak and a white supercilium on an otherwise black and white speckled face. Their mantle and back are blackish with whitish and olive-brown edges to the feathers. They have a white patch between their olive-brown scapulars. Their lower back is dark yellowish brown that becomes rustier towards the rump. Their flight feathers are brown with rufous edges and their wing coverts olive-brown to black with white tips. Their tail is dark yellowish brown with buffy white tips and rufous edges to the feathers. Their throat is whitish with faint darker mottling. Their breast and upper belly are darker than the throat, their belly's center is whitish, their sides and flanks are orangey to rusty with some blackish markings, and their undertail coverts are unmarked orangey to rusty. Females have the same pattern but different colors than males, generally replacing black with olive-brown.

== Distribution and habitat ==
The Manicore warbling antbird is found in a limited area of central Amazonian Brazil where southeastern Amazonas, northern Rondônia, and northwestern Mato Grosso meet. It occurs along the right bank of the Rio Madeira, between the rios Aripuanã and Ji-Paraná, and along the left bank of the Rio Roosevelt. The species inhabits terra firme forest. It favors the understorey of the forest edges and within the forest along watercourses and at gaps caused by fallen trees.

== Behavior ==
=== Movement ===
The Manicore warbling antbird is believed to be a year-round resident throughout its range.

=== Feeding ===
The Manicore warbling antbird's diet and foraging behavior are not known in detail, but it does feed on insects. Pairs forage together and sometimes join mixed-species feeding flocks that pass through their territory. Its diet and other behavior are assumed to be similar to those of H. cantator.

=== Breeding ===
Nothing is known about the Manicore warbling antbird's breeding biology.

=== Vocalization ===
The Manicore warbling antbird's song "commence with a long downslurred note followed by an accelerating series of abrupt notes (typically at least seven, and usually 9–10)." Its common call is unique among the H. cantator complex; this call is what initially marked the bird as a new taxon. The call "typically consists of four, less often three or five, notes. The first note is short but usually embellished with overtones, typically rises in frequency, and has a unique, screechy quality. The subsequent two, three, or four short notes are delivered at successively higher frequencies although the final two notes are sometimes at the same frequency. Pace is rapid, the most rapid of any Hypocnemis [cantator] population, and rondoni never ends its call with raspy notes as do some other populations."

== Status ==
The IUCN has assessed the Manicore warbling antbird as being of Least Concern. Its population size is not known and is believed to be decreasing. "It is not currently threatened by human activity, but the possible building of hydroelectric dams in the future may affect some watersheds in the area of the Aripuanã, Machado and Roosevelt rivers, but the degree to which this may affect the species is unknown. Much habitat within the range current remains intact, however the 'Transamazonica' federal highway BR-230 dissects the distribution of the species and is undoubtedly opening up additional areas to deforestation for the development of agriculture." It is considered fairly common, and locally common, but has a small range.
