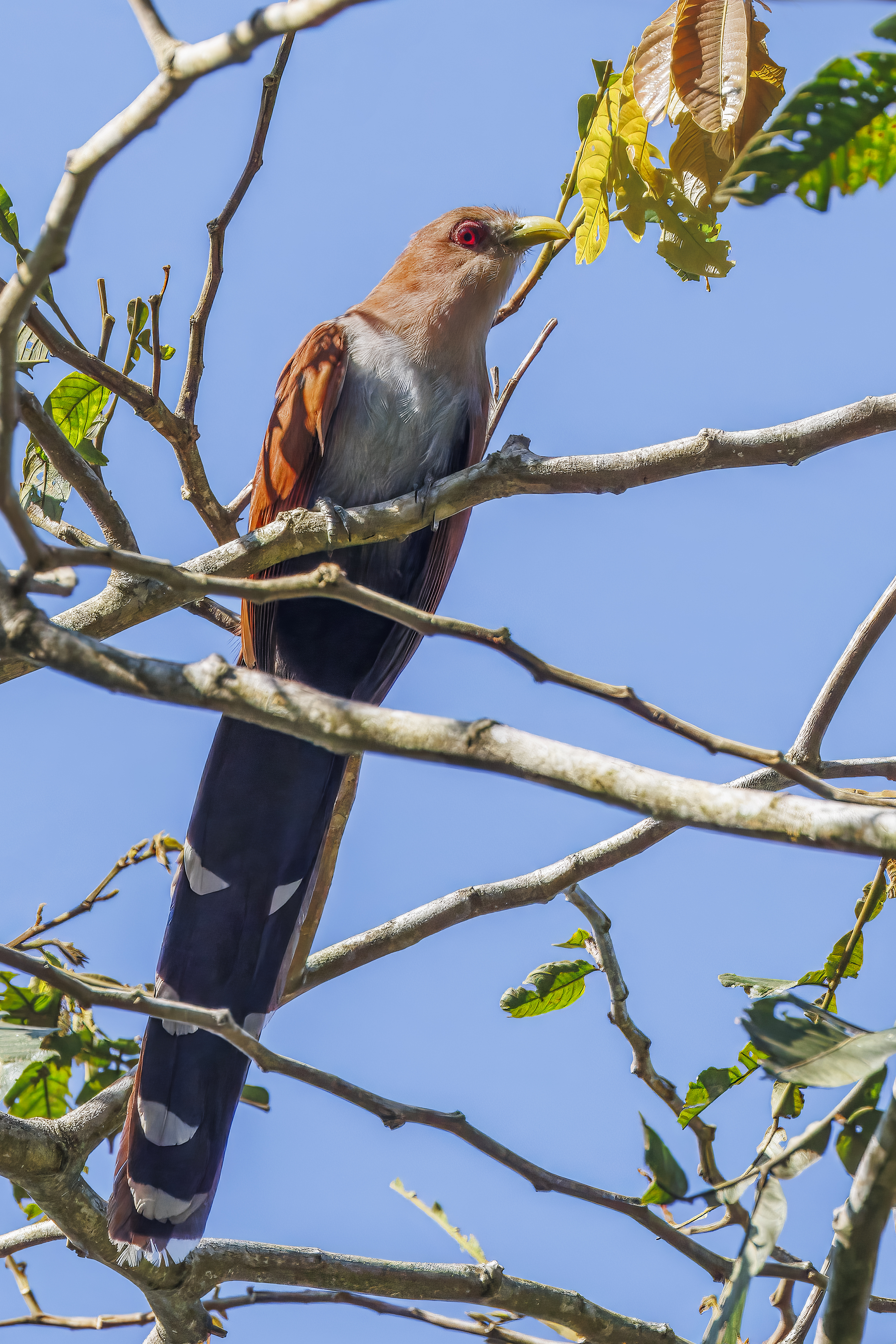
- Piaya cayana mesura, Ecuador

Conservation status
- Least Concern (IUCN 3.1)

Scientific classification
- Kingdom: Animalia
- Phylum: Chordata
- Class: Aves
- Order: Cuculiformes
- Family: Cuculidae
- Genus: Piaya
- Species: P. cayana

Binomial name
- Piaya cayana (Linnaeus, 1766)

Synonyms
- Cuculus cayanus Linnaeus, 1766

= Common squirrel cuckoo =

Species of bird

The common squirrel cuckoo (Piaya cayana) is a large and active species of cuckoo found in wooded habitats from northwestern Mexico to northern Argentina and Uruguay, and on Trinidad. The species was formerly considered to be conspecific with the Mexican squirrel cuckoo (Piaya mexicana).

== Taxonomy ==
In 1760 the French zoologist Mathurin Jacques Brisson included a description of the common squirrel cuckoo in the fourth volume of his Ornithologie based on a specimen collected in Cayenne, French Guiana. He used the French name Le coucou de Cayenne and the Latin name Cuculus cayanensis. Although Brisson coined Latin names, these do not conform to the binomial system and are not recognised by the International Commission on Zoological Nomenclature. When in 1766 the Swedish naturalist Carl Linnaeus updated his Systema Naturae for the twelfth edition he added 240 species that had been previously described by Brisson in his Ornithologie. One of these was the common squirrel cuckoo. Linnaeus included a terse description, coined the binomial name Cuculus cayanus and cited Brisson's work. The common squirrel cuckoo is now placed with the Mexican squirrel cuckoo and the black-bellied cuckoo in the genus Piaya that was introduced in 1830 by the French naturalist René Lesson.

This species' English name derives from its habit of running along branches and leaping from branch to branch like a squirrel. It normally flies only short distances, mainly gliding with an occasional flap.

Thirteen subspecies are recognised:

- P. c. thermophila Sclater, PL, 1860 – eastern Mexico to eastern Panama and northwestern Colombia and offshore islands
- P. c. nigricrissa (Cabanis, JL, 1862) – western Colombia (west slope of western Andes, the Cauca Valley, and the east slope of the northern central Andes), western Ecuador, and far northwestern Peru (Tumbes and Piura province)
- P. c. mehleri Bonaparte, CLJL, 1850 – northeastern Colombia and coastal northern Venezuela eastward to Paría Peninsula
- P. c. mesura (Cabanis, JL & Heine, F, 1863) – Colombia east of the Andes and eastern Ecuador
- P. c. circe Bonaparte, CLJL, 1850 – western Venezuela (region south of Lake Maracaibo)
- P. c. cayana (Linnaeus, C, 1766) – Río Orinoco Valley of Venezuela to the Guianas and northern Brazil
- P. c. insulana Hellmayr, CE, 1906 – Trinidad
- P. c. obscura Snethlage, E, 1908 – Brazil south of the Amazon River (Rio Juruá to Rio Tapajós)
- P. c. hellmayri Pinto, OMO, 1938 – Brazil south of the Amazon River (Santarém to Amazon River delta)
- P. c. pallescens (Cabanis, JL & Heine, F, 1863) – eastern Brazil (Piauí, Pernambuco, northern Bahia, and adjacent eastern Goiás)
- P. c. cabanisi Allen, JA, 1893 – south-central Brazil (central Mato Grosso and adjacent Goiás)
- P. c. macroura Gambel, W, 1849 – southeastern Brazil to Paraguay, Uruguay, and northeastern Argentina
- P. c. mogenseni Peters, JL, 1926 – southern Bolivia and adjacent northwestern Argentina

== Description ==
This large and extremely long-tailed cuckoo is 40.5–50 cm (15.9–19.7 in) long and weighs 95–120 g (3.4–4.2 oz). The adult has mainly chestnut upperparts and head, becoming paler on the throat. The lower breast is grey and the belly is blackish. The central tail feathers are rufous, but the outer are black with white tips. The bill is yellow and the iris is red. Immature birds have a grey bill and eyering, brown iris, and less white in the tail. It resembles the little cuckoo, but that species is smaller and has a darker throat.

There are a number of subspecies with minor plumage variations. For example, P. c. mehleri, one of the South American subspecies, has mainly brown (not black) outer tail feathers. Additionally, the subspecies from Mexico, Central America, and northern and western South America have a yellow eye-ring, but this is red in the remaining part of South America.

It makes explosive kip! and kip! weeuu calls, and the song is a whistled wheep wheep wheep wheep.

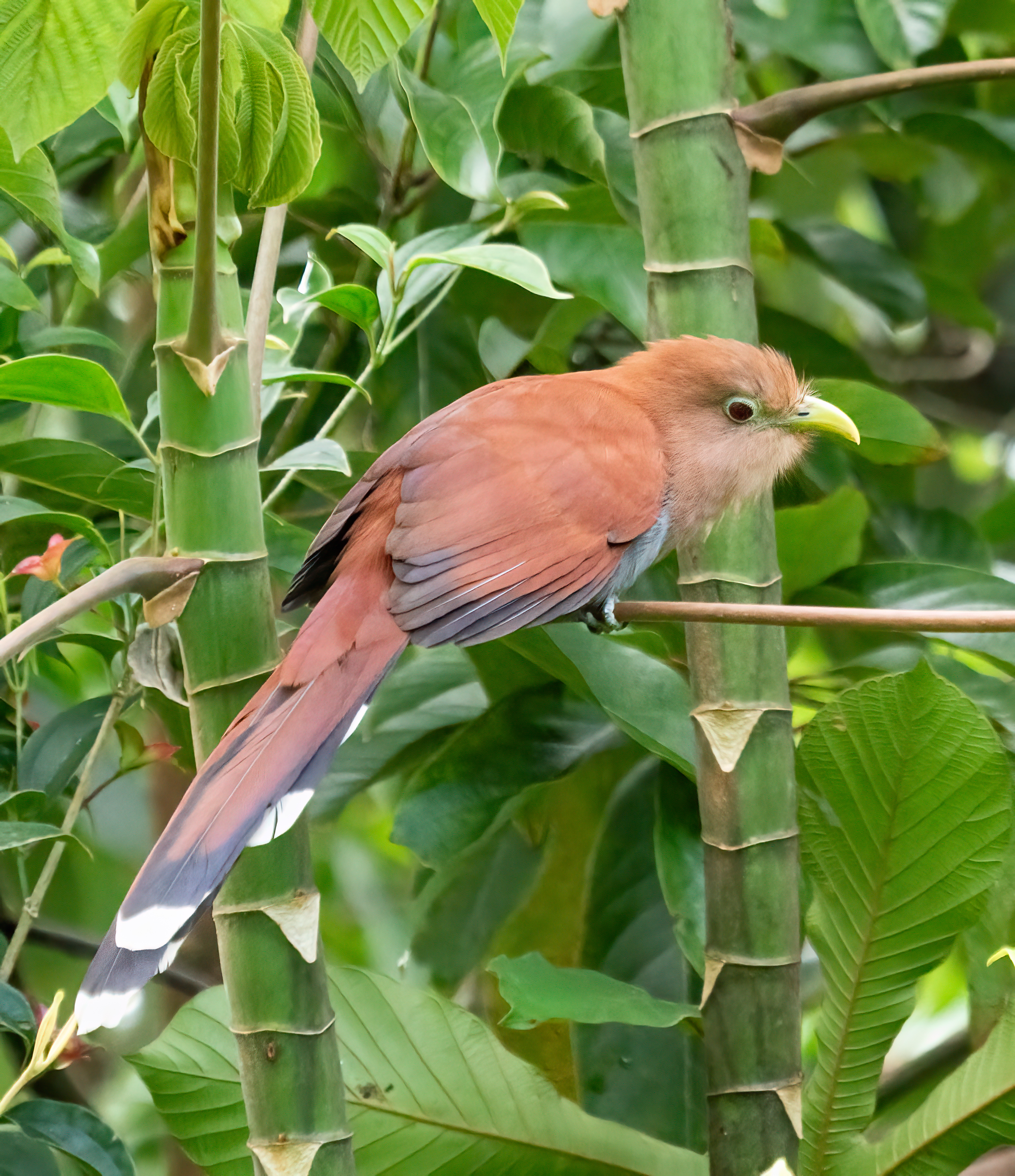
in Costa Rica

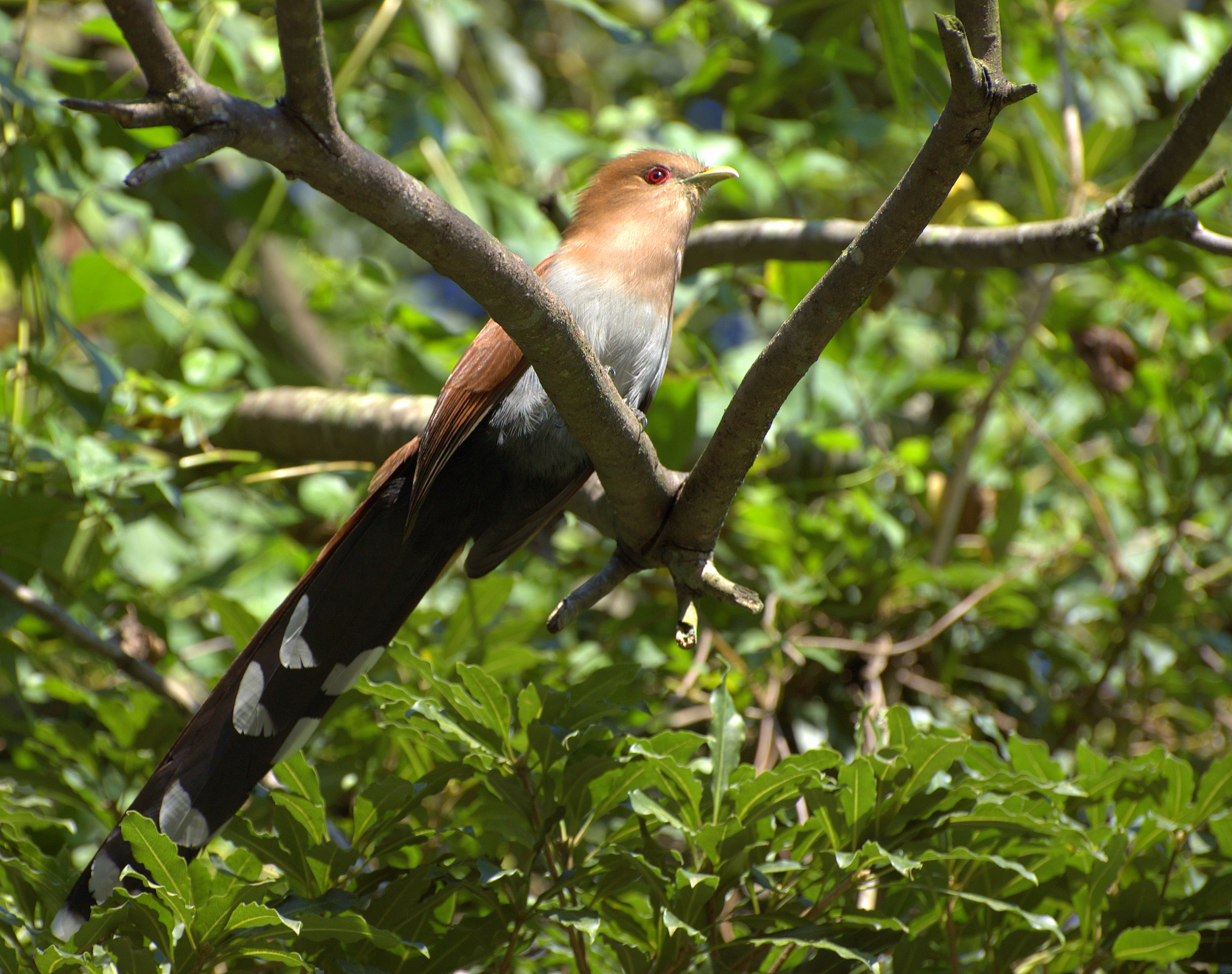
in Brazil

== Distribution and habitat ==
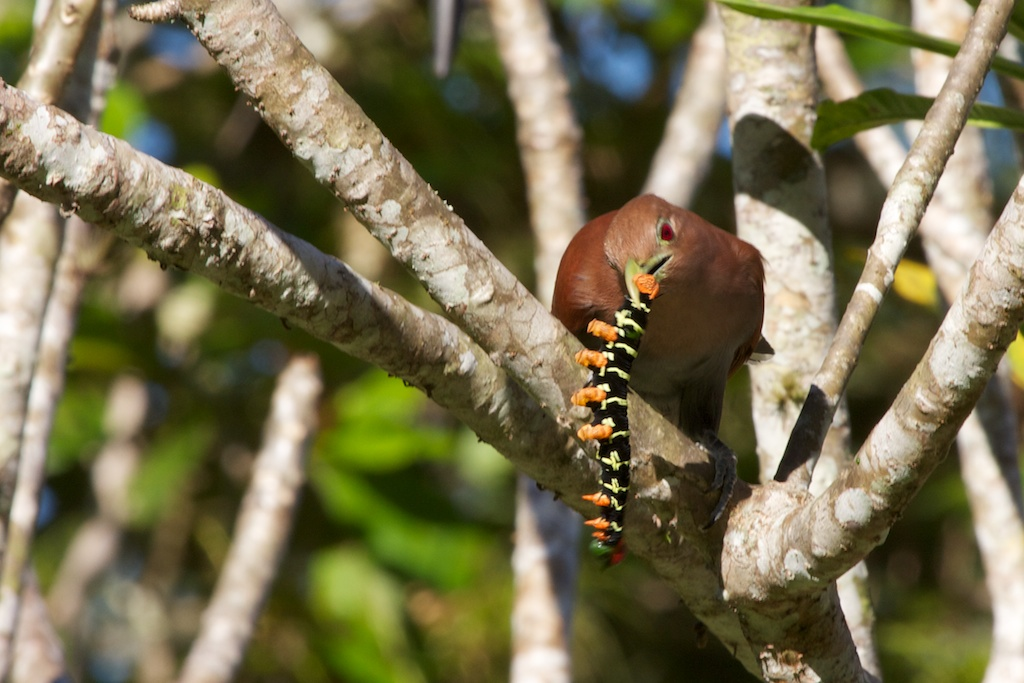
Squirrel cuckoo with a large caterpillar. Note the yellow eye-ring (the eye itself is reddish), typical of the subspecies from Mexico, Central America, and northern and western South America

The common squirrel cuckoo is found in woodland canopy and edges, second growth, hedges and semi-open habitats from sea level to as high as 2,500 m (8,200 ft), although it is uncommon above 1,200 m (3,900 ft).

== Behaviour ==
=== Food and feeding ===
It feeds on large insects such as cicadas, wasps and caterpillars (including those with stinging hairs or spines), and occasionally spiders, small amphibians and reptiles, such as small lizards, rarely taking fruit. Its non-flying prey is typically taken off the foliage with a quick lunge, but wasps may be caught on the wing. Squirrel cuckoos are often observed to forage peacefully alongside small mammals such as common marmosets (Callithrix jacchus) during the dry season for cocoa beans. In particular, they can be seen to attend army ant columns together, picking off prey flushed by the ants, and occasionally will join mixed-species feeding flocks.

=== Breeding ===
The nest is a shallow platform of leaves on a twig foundation, hidden in dense vegetation 1–12 m (3.3–39.4 ft) high in a tree. The female lays two or three chalky white eggs which are 35 mm × 26 mm (1.4 in × 1.0 in) in size. The eggs are incubated by both sexes for around 18 days. The young are fed insects by both parents and leave the nest after 8 days, before they can fly. Several broods are raised each year.

== Conservation status ==
The squirrel cuckoo is plentiful in most of its range and appears to be quite tolerant of human disturbance, as long as woodland remains. Compared to many cuckoos in the world, it is relatively bold and conspicuous, although it is most often encountered skulking about within vegetation. Owing to its wide range, it is considered a species of Least Concern by the IUCN.
