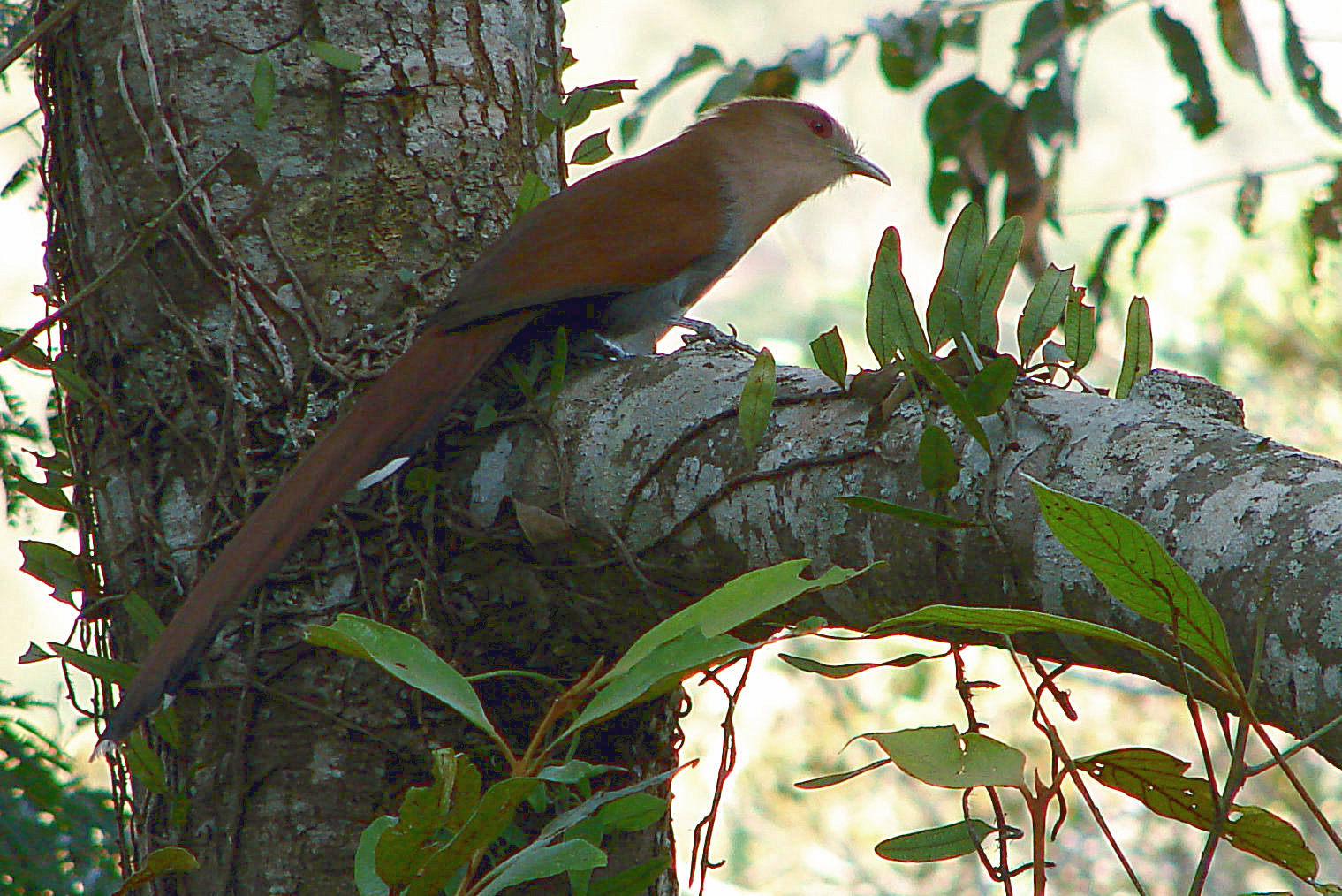
- Squirrel cuckoo (Piaya cayana)

Scientific classification
- Kingdom: Animalia
- Phylum: Chordata
- Class: Aves
- Order: Cuculiformes
- Family: Cuculidae
- Genus: Piaya; Lesson, 1830

Type species
- Cuculus cayanus Linnaeus, 1766

Species
- P. cayana P. melanogaster

= Piaya =

Genus of birds

Piaya is a small genus of relatively large and long-tailed cuckoos, which occur in Mexico, Central America and South America.

== Taxonomy ==
The genus Piaya was introduced in 1830 by the French naturalist René Lesson with the type species as Cuculus cayanus Linnaeus 1766, the common squirrel cuckoo. The genus name is from the Cayenne Creole name Piaye, the devil bird, for the common squirrel cuckoo.

== Species ==
The genus contains three species:

Genus Piaya – Lesson, 1830 – three species
Common name	Scientific name and subspecies	Range	Size and ecology	IUCN status and estimated population
Common squirrel cuckoo	Piaya cayana (Linnaeus, 1766) Thirteen subspecies: P. c. thermophila Sclater, PL, 1860; P. c. nigricrissa (Cabanis, JL, 1862); P. c. mehleri Bonaparte, CLJL, 1850; P. c. mesura (Cabanis, JL & Heine, F, 1863); P. c. circe Bonaparte, CLJL, 1850; P. c. cayana (Linnaeus, C, 1766); P. c. insulana Hellmayr, CE, 1906; P. c. obscura Snethlage, E, 1908; P. c. hellmayri Pinto, OMO, 1938; P. c. pallescens (Cabanis, JL & Heine, F, 1863); P. c. cabanisi Allen, JA, 1893; P. c. macroura Gambel, W, 1849; P. c. mogenseni Peters, JL, 1926	northwestern Mexico to northern Argentina and Uruguay, and on Trinidad.	Size: Habitat: Diet:	LC
Mexican squirrel cuckoo	Piaya mexicana (Swainson, 1827)	Pacific slope of Mexico (Sinaloa to Isthmus of Tehuántepec)	Size: Habitat: Diet:	LC
Black-bellied cuckoo	Piaya melanogaster (Vieillot, 1817)	Guyana, Surinam, French Guiana, eastern Venezuela, Northern Bolivia, Colombia, Ecuador, eastern Perú and Brazil.	Size: Habitat: Diet:	LC

The little cuckoo has been found to be closer to some species traditionally placed in Coccyzus or Micrococcyx. These are now again separated in Coccycua.

== Description and ecology ==
These birds are birds with relatively slender bodies, long tails and strong legs. The black-bellied cuckoo is essentially restricted to rainforest, but the more widespread squirrel cuckoo also occurs in other forest types, woodlands or mangroves.

Piaya cuckoos, unlike many Old World species, are not brood parasites; they build their own nests in trees and lay two eggs. Parasitic cuckoos lay coloured eggs to match those of their passerine hosts, but the non-parasitic Piaya species, like most other non-passerines, lay white eggs.

These are vocal species with persistent and loud calls. They feed on large insects such as cicadas, wasps and caterpillars (including those with stinging hairs or spines which are distasteful to many birds). Squirrel and black-bellied cuckoos are large and powerful species, and occasionally take vertebrate prey such as small lizards.
