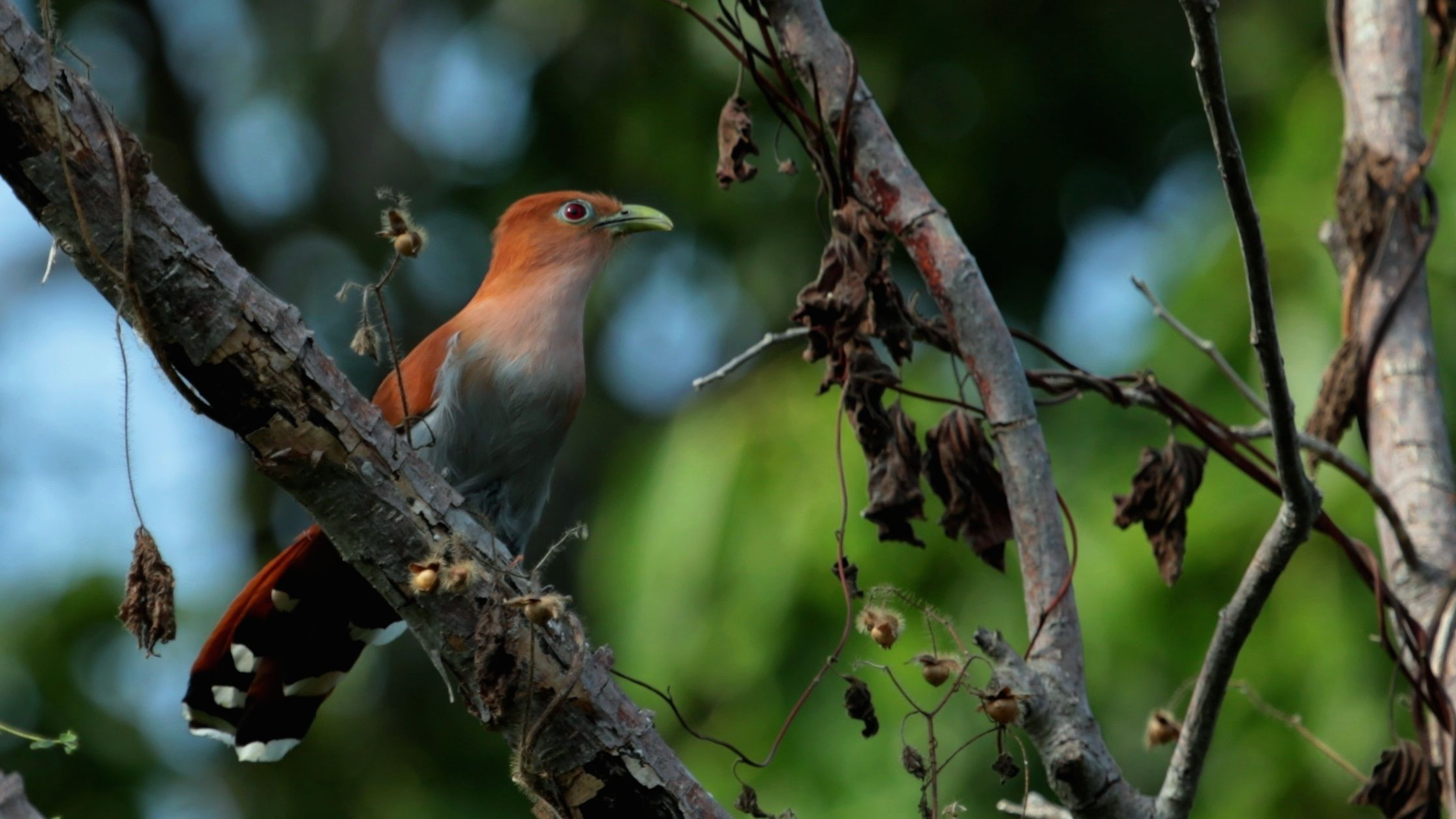

Conservation status
- Least Concern (IUCN 3.1)

Scientific classification
- Kingdom: Animalia
- Phylum: Chordata
- Class: Aves
- Order: Cuculiformes
- Family: Cuculidae
- Genus: Piaya
- Species: P. mexicana

Binomial name
- Piaya mexicana (Swainson, 1827)

Synonyms
- Cuculus mexicanus Swainson, 1827 (protonym)

= Mexican squirrel cuckoo =

Species of bird

The Mexican squirrel cuckoo (Piaya mexicana) is a large species of cuckoo found in wooded habitats in western Mexico. The species was formerly considered to be a subspecies of the common squirrel cuckoo (Piaya mexicana).

== Taxonomy ==
The Mexican squirrel cuckoo was formally described in 1827 by the English zoologist William Swainson based on a specimen that had been collected by William Bullock in the Temascaltepec district of Mexico. Swainson placed the new species in the genus Cuculus and coined the binomial name Cuculus mexicanus. The species is now placed with the common squirrel cuckoo and the black-bellied cuckoo in the genus Piaya that was introduced in 1830 by the French naturalist René Lesson. The Mexican squirrel cuckoo was formerly considered to be a subspecies of the widely distributed common squirrel cuckoo. It is now treated as a separate species based on the morphological and color differences, as well as on an analysis of mitochondrial DNA sequences. The species is monotypic: no subspecies are recognised.

This species' English name derives from its habit of running along branches and leaping from branch to branch like a squirrel. It normally flies only short distances, mainly gliding with an occasional flap.

== Description ==
This large and extremely long-tailed cuckoo is 45.6 cm (18.0 in) long and weighs 103–108 g (3.6–3.8 oz). The adult has mainly chestnut upperparts and head, becoming paler on the throat. The lower breast is grey and the belly is blackish. The central tail feathers are rufous with white tips. The bill is yellow and the iris is red. The sexes are similar.

It differs from the common squirrel cuckoo in having a rufous rather than a black feathers under the tail. The bill is shorter and the skin around the eye is usually greenish gray rather than greenish yellow.

== Distribution and habitat ==
The Mexican squirrel cuckoo is found in open woodlands, second growth, hedges and semi-open habitats from sea level to as high as 2,300 m (7,500 ft) but usually below 1,200 m (3,900 ft).

== Behaviour ==
=== Food and feeding ===
It feeds on large insects such as cicadas, wasps and caterpillars (including those with stinging hairs or spines), and occasionally spiders, small amphibians and reptiles, such as small lizards, rarely taking fruit. Its non-flying prey is typically taken off the foliage with a quick lunge, but wasps may be caught on the wing.

=== Breeding ===
The nest is a shallow platform of leaves on a twig foundation, hidden in dense vegetation 1–12 m (3.3–39.4 ft) high in a tree. The female lays two or three chalky white eggs which are 35 mm × 26 mm (1.4 in × 1.0 in) in size. The eggs are incubated by both sexes for around 18 days. The young are fed insects by both parents and leave the nest after 8 days, before they can fly. Several broods are raised each year.

== Conservation status ==
The Mexican squirrel cuckoo is plentiful in most of its range and appears to be quite tolerant of human disturbance, as long as woodland remains. Compared to many cuckoos in the world, it is relatively bold and conspicuous, although it is most often encountered skulking about within vegetation. It is considered a species of Least Concern by the IUCN.
