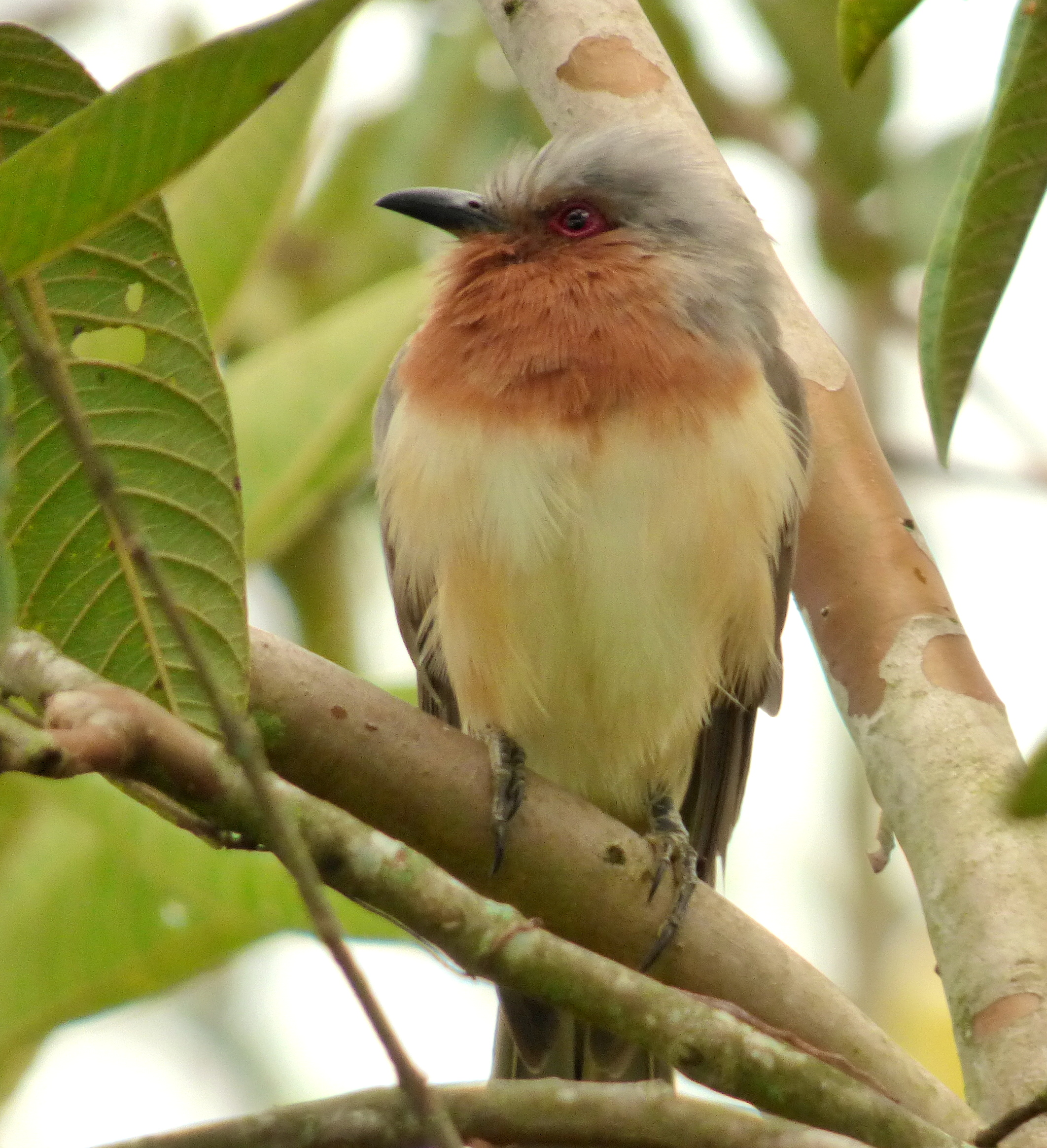

Conservation status
- Least Concern (IUCN 3.1)

Scientific classification
- Kingdom: Animalia
- Phylum: Chordata
- Class: Aves
- Order: Cuculiformes
- Family: Cuculidae
- Genus: Coccycua
- Species: C. pumila

Binomial name
- Coccycua pumila (Strickland, 1852)

Synonyms
- Coccyzus pumilus Strickland, 1852; Micrococcyx pumilus (Strickland, 1852)

= Dwarf cuckoo =

Species of bird

The dwarf cuckoo (Coccycua pumila) is a tropical American bird species of the cuckoo family (Cuculidae).

It was formerly placed in the genus Coccyzus or Micrococcyx. Following the discovery that it belongs to a distinct lineage around the little cuckoo, the genus Coccycua has been reinstated for these.

It is found in Brazil, Colombia, Panama, and Venezuela. Its natural habitats are subtropical or tropical dry forest, subtropical or tropical moist lowland forest, and heavily degraded former forest.
