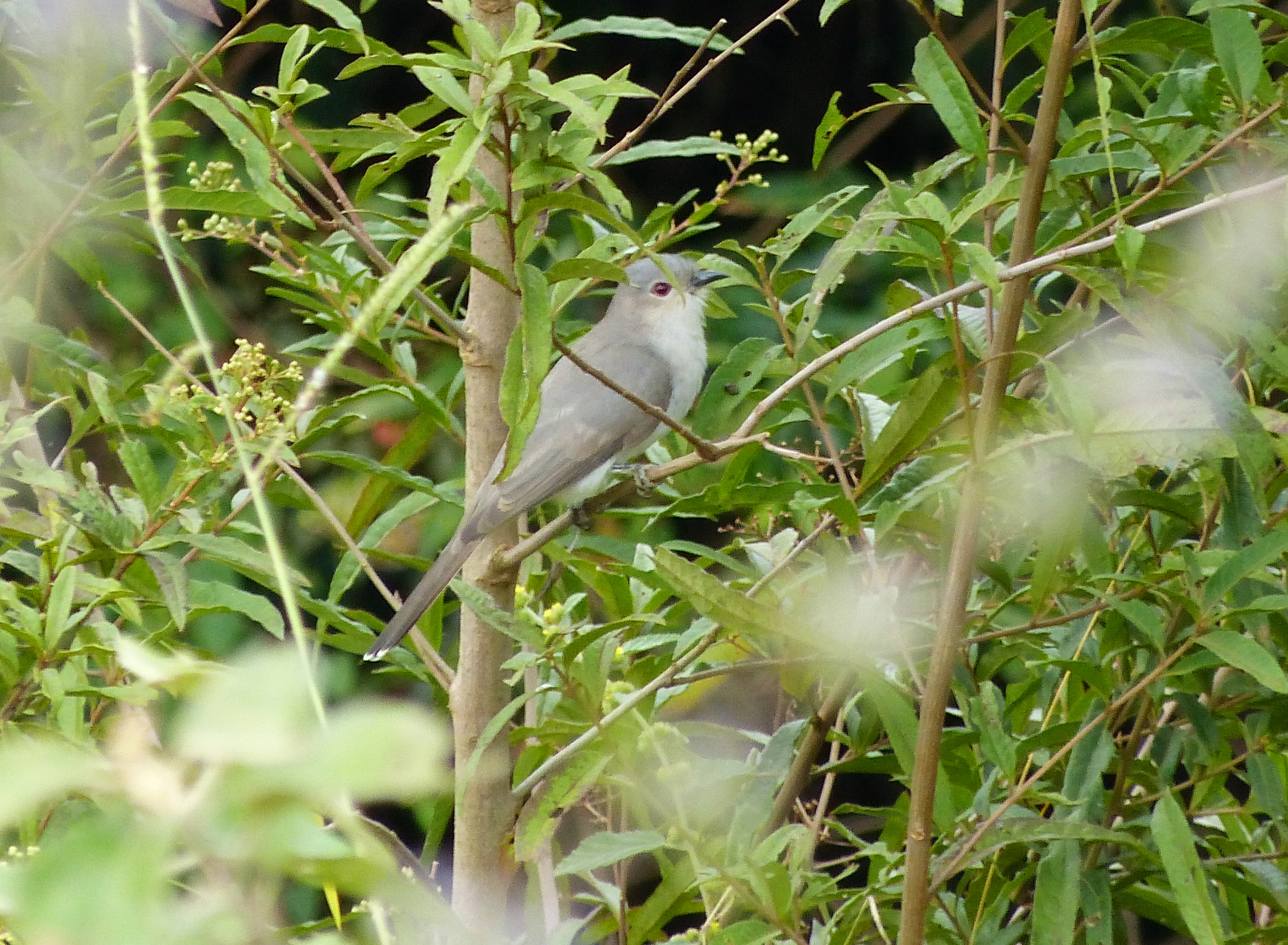

Conservation status
- Least Concern (IUCN 3.1)

Scientific classification
- Kingdom: Animalia
- Phylum: Chordata
- Class: Aves
- Order: Cuculiformes
- Family: Cuculidae
- Genus: Coccycua
- Species: C. cinerea

Binomial name
- Coccycua cinerea (Vieillot, 1817)

Synonyms
- Coccyzus cinereus Vieillot, 1817; Micrococcyx cinereus (Vieillot, 1817)

= Ash-colored cuckoo =

Species of bird

The ash-colored cuckoo (Coccycua cinerea) is an American bird species of the cuckoo family (Cuculidae).

It was formerly placed in the genus Coccyzus or Micrococcyx. Following the discovery that it belongs to a distinct lineage around the little cuckoo, the genus Coccycua has been reinstated for these.

Its range extends from northern and central Argentina to Uruguay and São Paulo (state); its wintering range extend northwards towards Amazonas. Its natural habitats are subtropical or tropical dry forest and subtropical or tropical moist lowland forest.
