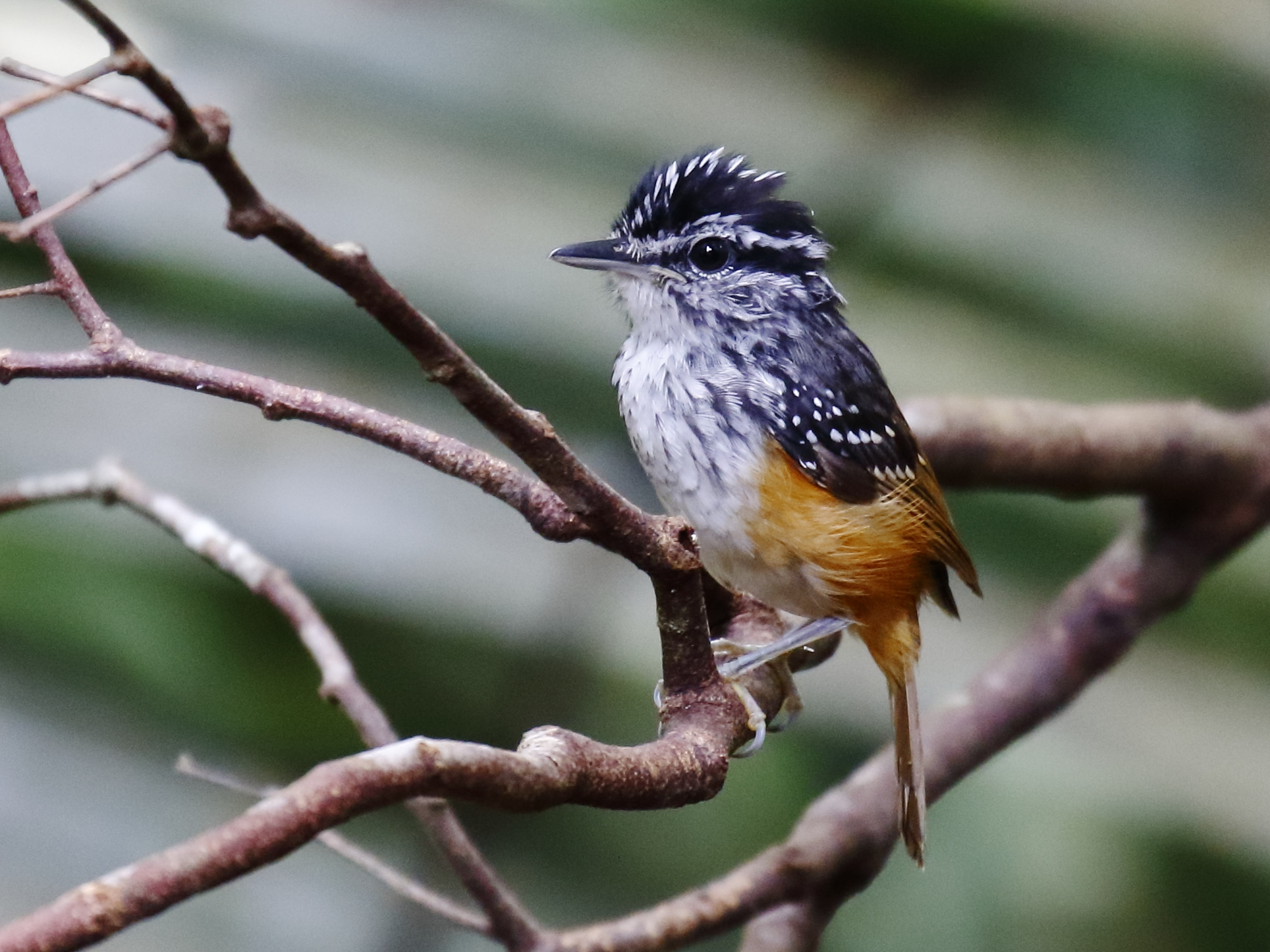

Conservation status
- Least Concern (IUCN 3.1)

Scientific classification
- Kingdom: Animalia
- Phylum: Chordata
- Class: Aves
- Order: Passeriformes
- Family: Thamnophilidae
- Genus: Hypocnemis
- Species complex: Hypocnemis cantator complex
- Species: H. cantator

Binomial name
- Hypocnemis cantator (Boddaert, 1783)

Synonyms
- Hypocnemis cantator cantator

= Guianan warbling antbird =

Species of bird

The Guianan warbling antbird, or Guianan antwarbler, (Hypocnemis cantator) is an insectivorous bird in subfamily Thamnophilinae of family Thamnophilidae, the "typical antbirds". It is found in Brazil, French Guiana, Guyana, Suriname, and Venezuela.

== Taxonomy and systematics ==
The French polymath Georges-Louis Leclerc, Comte de Buffon described the Guianan warbling antbird in his Histoire Naturelle des Oiseaux in 1779. The bird was also illustrated in a hand-colored plate engraved by François-Nicolas Martinet in the Planches Enluminées D'Histoire Naturelle which was produced under the supervision of Edme-Louis Daubenton to accompany Buffon's text. Buffon did not include a scientific name with his description but in 1783 the Dutch naturalist Pieter Boddaert coined the binomial name Formicarius cantatar in his catalogue of the Planches Enluminées. Its present genus Hypocnemis was introduced by the German ornithologist Jean Cabanis in 1847. The specific epithet is from the Latin cantator "a singer".

The Imeri (Hypocnemis flavescens), Peruvian (H. peruviana), yellow-breasted (H. subflava), and Spix's warbling antbird (H. striata) were all formerly treated as subspecies of what is now the Guianan warbling antbird. That multi-subspecies taxon was simply called the warbling antbird. A study published in 2007 found that there were significant vocal differences as well as small plumage differences between the taxa and they are now all treated as separate species. What is now the Rondonia warbling antbird (H. ochrogyna) had not at the time been fully described but was also included in the analysis.

As presently defined, the Guianan warbling antbird is monotypic, although before the 2007 paper the subspecies notaea sometimes had been recognized.

== Description ==
The Guianan warbling antbird is 11 to 12 cm (4.3 to 4.7 in) long and weighs 10 to 14 g (0.35 to 0.49 oz). Adult males have a black crown with a white central streak and a white supercilium on an otherwise black and white speckled face. Their upperparts are olive-gray with a white patch between the scapulars; the center of the patch has black and white speckles. Their rump is rufous. Their flight feathers are brown with yellowish olive-brown edges and their wing coverts black with white tips. Their tail is brown with pale buff tips to the feathers. Their throat is very pale gray. Their breast and sides are spotted with black and white, their belly's center is white, and their flanks and undertail coverts are rufous. Females have the same pattern but different colors than males. Their crown is streaked with pale buff, the interscapular patch is small or absent, and their wing coverts are olive-brown with pale buff tips. Juvenile males have the adult pattern but are duller overall, lack the interscapular patch, and have a dull brown breast. Subadult males resemble adult females.

== Distribution and habitat ==
The Guianan warbling antbird is found in Venezuela's Bolívar state, in the Guianas, and in northeastern Brazil from the lower Rio Negro to the Atlantic in Amapá. It inhabits the edges of terra firme and várzea evergreen forest, the transition zone between them, and adjacent mature secondary woodland. It also occurs within the forest along watercourses and at gaps caused by fallen trees. In elevation it ranges to 1,200 m (3,900 ft) in Venezuela and 1,300 m (4,300 ft) in Guyana.

== Behavior ==
=== Movement ===
The Guianan warbling antbird is believed to be a year-round resident throughout its range.

=== Feeding ===
The Guianan warbling antbird's diet is not known in detail, but it feeds primarily on insects and spiders. It typically forages by itself, in pairs, or in family groups and sometimes joins mixed-species feeding flocks. It mostly forages from the ground up to about 6 m (20 ft) above it though occasionally as high as 12 m (40 ft). It forages mostly in dense vegetation such as vine tangles, understorey shrubs, bamboo thickets, and among epiphyte cluster on tree trunks and branches. It takes most of its prey by reaching or lunging from a perch and also makes short sallies to overhanging vegetation and probes clusters of dead leaves. It regularly follows army ant swarms, though it defers to obligate ant followers.

=== Breeding ===
The Guianan warbling antbird's breeding season varies geographically, for example spanning May to October in Suriname and July to November in French Guiana. It appears to be concentrated in July and August in Brazil though it might include almost any month except February. Its nest is a deep pouch made of dried or rotting leaves, rhizomorphs, and moss that hangs from a branch. The known nests were all between 0.3 and 1.5 m (1 and 5 ft) above the ground. The usual clutch is two eggs; they are generally white or pinkish with darker markings. Both parents incubate during the day and the female alone at night; both parents brood and provision nestlings. The incubation period is at least 12 days and fledging occurs about 11 days after hatch.

=== Vocalization ===
The male Guianan warbling antbird's song is "a series of [7–10] clear notes ... that become raspy rather abruptly, ... accelerating and comprising a short initial note, then 2–6 notes of similar shape and peak frequency, but at a lower peak frequency than the short first note, before an abrupt shift to a third group of 1–4 similar notes at an even higher peak frequency than the initial note". The female typically answers with "6–9 notes ... that descend in frequency". The species' most common call is "a brief repetitive series of 2–4 (typically three) similar, clear notes of essentially level peak frequencies, with the final notes often becoming raspy". It also makes "a sharp 'chit'".

== Status ==
The IUCN originally in 2009 assessed the Guianan warbling antbird as being of Least Concern, then in 2012 as Near Threatened, and since 2019 again as of Least Concern. It has a large range; its population size is not known but is believed to be stable. "The primary threat to this species is deforestation, as land is cleared for cattle ranching and soy production, facilitated by expansion of the road network. It may be particularly susceptible to the fragmentation of its forest habitat." It is considered fairly common to common throughout its range, which includes many protected areas in most of the five countries it inhabits.
