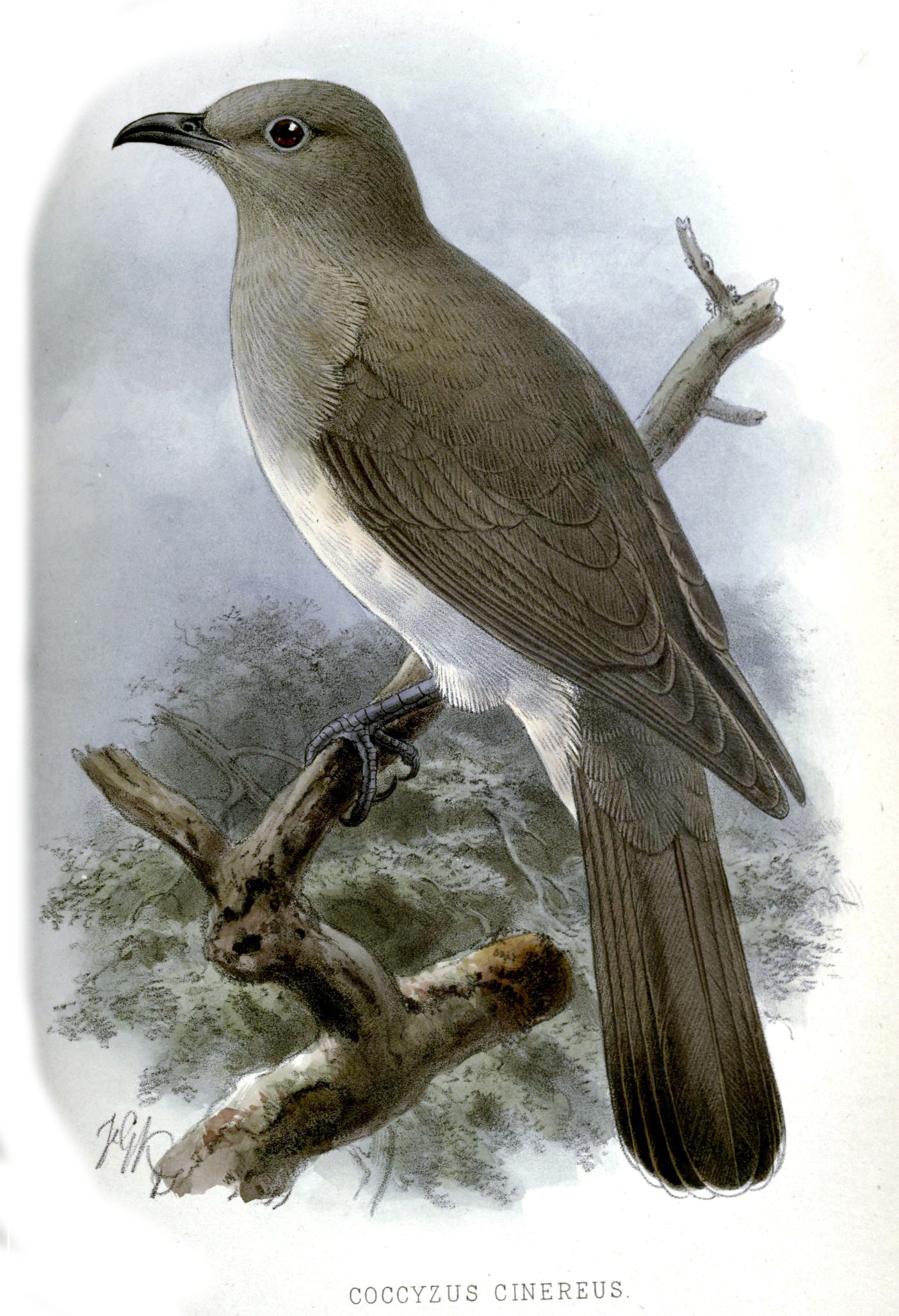
- Ash-colored cuckoo (Coccycua cinerea)

Scientific classification
- Kingdom: Animalia
- Phylum: Chordata
- Class: Aves
- Order: Cuculiformes
- Family: Cuculidae
- Genus: Coccycua; Lesson, 1830

Type species
- Cuculus monachus Lesson, 1830

Species
- 3, see text

Synonyms
- Numerous, see text

= Coccycua =

Genus of birds

Coccycua is a small genus of birds in the cuckoo family, Cuculidae. Its three species are found in the tropical Americas.

Formerly, they were divided among in Coccyzus (two species) and Piaya (one species), or the former were assigned to Micrococcyx and only the latter to Coccycua. Following the discovery that they form a monophyletic lineage equidistant to both related genera, Coccycua has been revalidated.

== Species ==
The species are:

Image	Scientific name	Common name	Distribution
	Coccycua minuta	Little cuckoo	Panama, Trinidad & Tobago, Tumbes-Chocó-Magdalena, Amazon Basin, Guianas and western Cerrado
	Coccycua pumila	Dwarf cuckoo	Colombia and Venezuela
	Coccycua cinerea	Ash-colored cuckoo	northern and central Argentina to Uruguay and São Paulo (state); winters north towards Amazonas

== Synonyms ==
The genus name Coccycua has often been believed to be a misspelling, and various emendations have been proposed. However, the name as originally written is valid. The junior synonyms are:

- Coccicua Lesson, 1837 (unjustified emendation)
- Coccygua Fitzinger, 1856 (unjustified emendation)
- Coccyzaea Hartlaub, 1842 (unjustified emendation)
- Coccyzusa Cabanis & Heine, [1863] (unjustified emendation)
- Micrococcyx Ridgway, 1912
