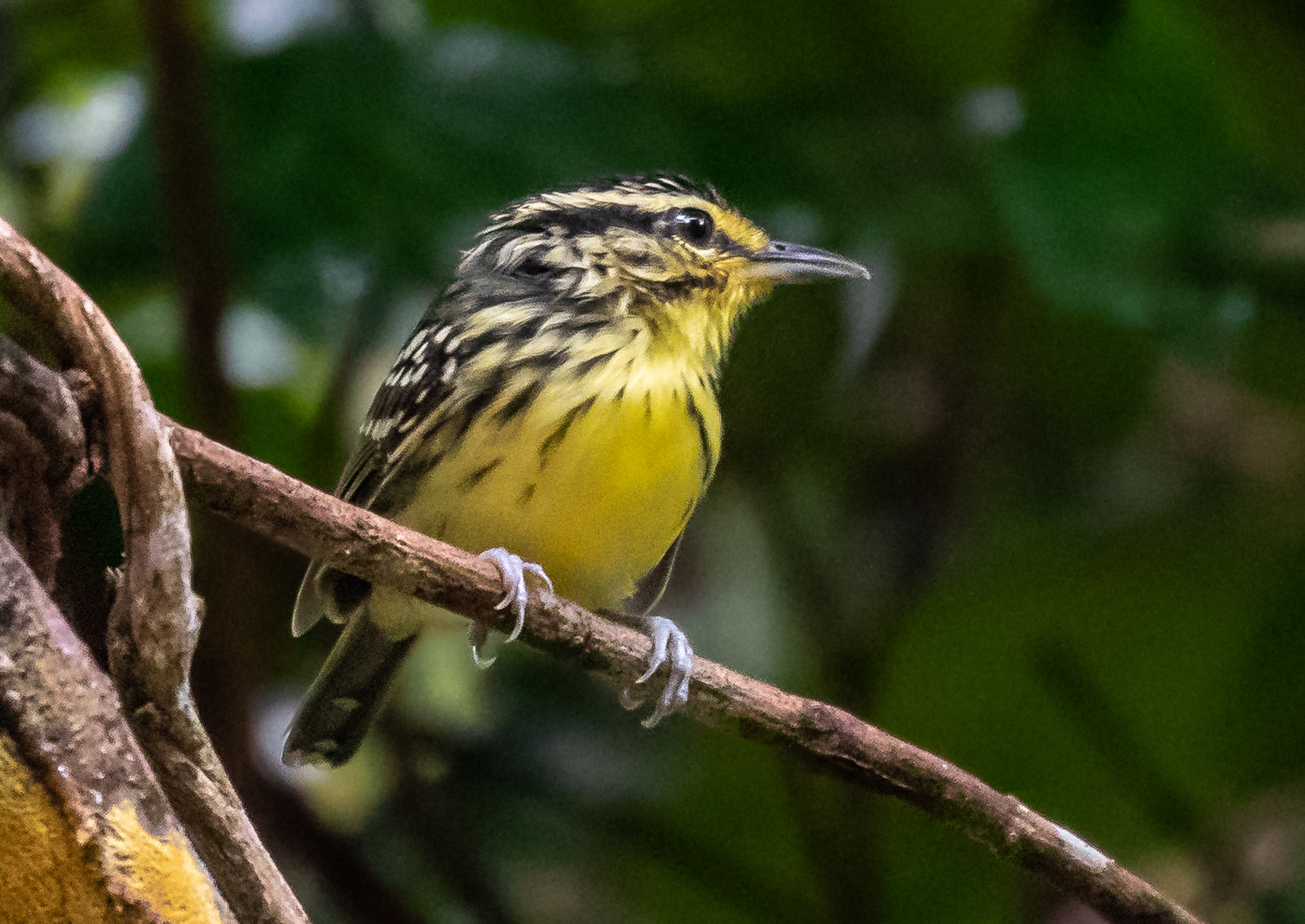
- At Manacapuru, Amazonas state, Brazil.

Conservation status
- Least Concern (IUCN 3.1)

Scientific classification
- Kingdom: Animalia
- Phylum: Chordata
- Class: Aves
- Order: Passeriformes
- Family: Thamnophilidae
- Genus: Hypocnemis
- Species: H. hypoxantha

Binomial name
- Hypocnemis hypoxantha Sclater, PL, 1869

= Yellow-browed antbird =

Species of bird

The yellow-browed antbird, or yellow-browed antwarbler, (Hypocnemis hypoxantha) is a species of bird in subfamily Thamnophilinae of family Thamnophilidae, the "typical antbirds". It is found in Brazil, Colombia, Ecuador, and Peru.

== Taxonomy and systematics ==
The yellow-browed antbird was described by the English zoologist Philip Sclater in 1869 and given its current binomial name Hypocnemis hypoxantha. The specific epithet combines the Ancient Greek hupo meaning "beneath" and xanthos meaning "yellow". The yellow-browed antbird is the only species of genus Hypocnemis that was not formerly a member of the warbling antbird (H. cantator sensu lato) complex, and it might be more closely related to some members of genus Drymophila than to the other Hypocnemis species.

The yellow-browed antbird has two subspecies, the nominate H. h. hypoxantha (Sclater, PL, 1869) and H. h. ochraceiventris (Chapman, 1921)

== Description ==
The yellow-browed antbird is 11 to 13 cm (4.3 to 5.1 in) long and weighs 10 to 13 g (0.35 to 0.46 oz). Adult males of the nominate subspecies have a black crown with white spots down its center. They have a bright lemon yellow supercilium and ear coverts, a black line through the eye, and a black malar "moustache". Their upperparts, sides, flanks, and tail are light grayish olive. Their flight feathers are grayish olive with white tips and their wing coverts black with white tips. Their throat and underparts are bright lemon yellow with some black streaks on the side of the breast. Adult females are similar to males but are overall paler and their crown center and wing covert tips are light buff. Subspecies H. h. ochraceiventris is larger than the nominate. It is overall somewhat browner, with paler yellow underparts, more streaking on the breast, and pale ochraceous buff flanks. Both sexes of both subspecies have a brown iris, a black maxilla, and gray legs and feet. Males have a black mandible and females a gray one.

== Distribution and habitat ==
The yellow-browed antbird has a disjunct distribution The nominate subspecies has by far the larger range of the two. It is found from the southern Colombian departments of Caquetá, Guaviare, and Vaupés south through eastern Ecuador into northern Peru. There its range extends to the Marañón River in the central north and in the northeast extends south to the Department of Ucayali. Its range extends east from Colombia and northern Peru into western Amazonian Brazil. North of the Amazon the subspecies occurs to the Negro River and south of the Amazon to the Javari and Juruá rivers. Subspecies H. h. ochraceiventris is found in Brazil south of the Amazon from the Tapajós and its tributary Teles Pires rivers east to the Xingu River.

The yellow-browed antbird inhabits the understorey to mid-storey of the interior of terra firme forest and mature secondary forest. It is a bird of the lowlands, in elevation reaching only about 400 m (1,300 ft) in Colombia and Ecuador.

== Behavior ==
=== Movement ===
The yellow-browed antbird is believed to be a year-round resident throughout its range.

=== Feeding ===
The yellow-browed antbird's diet is not known in detail, but it does feed on insects and spiders. Pairs forage together, moving slowly through vegetation, and usually taking prey from foliage by gleaning and by short hops and sallies. It sometimes joins mixed-species feeding flocks and occasionally attends army ant swarms.

=== Breeding ===
Two yellow-browed antbird nests have been described. One was found in Ecuador in October and the other in Peru in July. They were deep pouches; the Ecuador one was almost entirely made of leaves bound by rootlets and fungal rhizomorphs and the one in Peru about half leaves and half small twigs and flexible fibers. Both had some additional leaves and fibers loosely dangling from their outside, and both were lined with thin fibers and rhizomorphs. Respectively, they were suspended 1.4 m (5 ft) and 0.8 m (3 ft) above the ground. The Ecuador nest contained two eggs that were white with pale cinnamon and darker red-brown markings. Both adults incubated them. The Peru nest had one nestling at discovery. At both nests both adults provisioned the nestlings.

=== Vocalization ===
The yellow-browed antbird's song is "an evenly and slow-paced, descending series of modulated whistles: DCHEET djeet djeer djeer djeer djeer djer" and it calls "a whistled, whiny series of descending notes: pwee-pwee-pwee and [a] burry grr-grr".

== Status ==
The IUCN has assessed the yellow-browed antbird as being of Least Concern. It has a large range; its population size is not known but is believed to be decreasing. No immediate threats have been identified. It is considered uncommon in Colombia, uncommon to locally fairly common in Ecuador, and uncommon to fairly common in Peru. "Human activity has little direct effect on the Yellow-browed Antbird, other than the local effects of habitat destruction."
