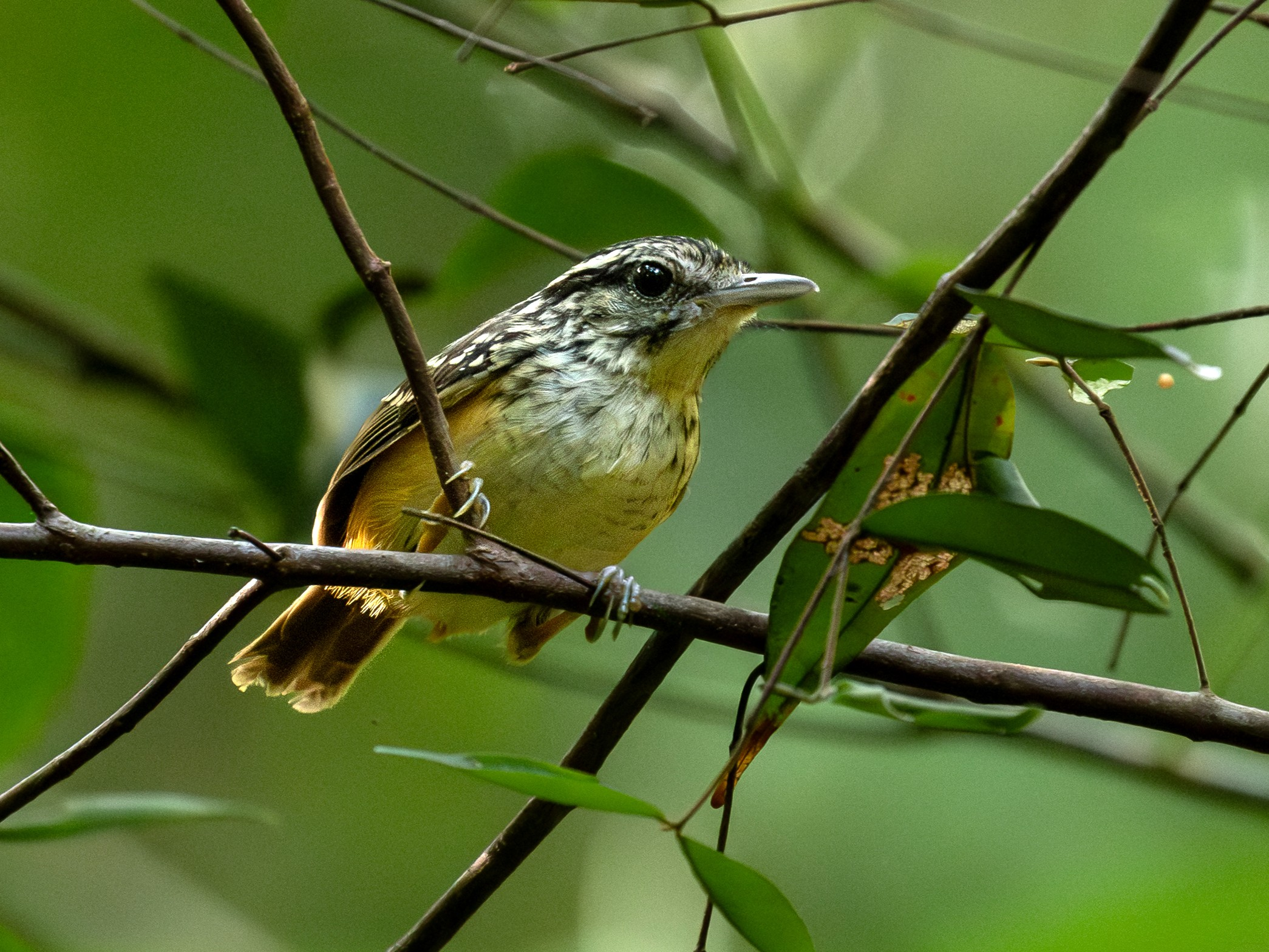

Conservation status
- Least Concern (IUCN 3.1)

Scientific classification
- Kingdom: Animalia
- Phylum: Chordata
- Class: Aves
- Order: Passeriformes
- Family: Thamnophilidae
- Genus: Hypocnemis
- Species complex: Hypocnemis cantator complex
- Species: H. flavescens

Binomial name
- Hypocnemis flavescens Sclater, PL, 1865

Synonyms
- Hypocnemis cantator flavescens and Hypocnemis cantator perflava

= Imeri warbling antbird =

Species of bird

The Imeri warbling antbird or Imeri antwarbler (Hypocnemis flavescens) is a species of bird in subfamily Thamnophilinae of family Thamnophilidae, the "typical antbirds". It is found in Brazil, Colombia, and Venezuela.

== Taxonomy and systematics ==
The Imeri warbling antbird was described by the English zoologist Philip Sclater in 1865 and given the binomial name Hypocnemis flavescens. It was later merged into the then warbling antbird (Hypocnemis cantator sensu lato). Following a study published in 2007 that assessed vocal differences and to a lesser degree differences in plumages among the warbling antbird's subspecies, it and several others were elevated to full species status.

The Imeri warbling antbird has two subspecies, the nominate H. f. flavescens (Sclater, PL, 1865) and H. f. perflava (Pinto, 1966).

== Description ==
The Imeri warbling antbird is 11 to 12 cm (4.3 to 4.7 in) long and weighs 11 to 15 g (0.39 to 0.53 oz). Adult males have a black crown with a white central streak and a white supercilium on an otherwise black and white speckled face. Their upperparts are olive-gray with a white patch between the scapulars; the center of the patch has black and white speckles. Their rump is rufous. Their flight feathers are brown with yellowish olive-brown edges and their wing coverts black with white tips. Their tail is brown with pale buff tips to the feathers. Their throat and breast are pale gray with a yellow tinge. Their breast and sides have sparse dark streaks and their belly, flanks, and undertail coverts are deep rufous. Females have the same pattern but different colors than males. Their crown is streaked with pale buff, the interscapular patch is small or absent, and their wing coverts are olive-brown with pale buff tips.

== Distribution and habitat ==
The nominate subspecies of the Imeri warbling antbird is found in southern Venezuela's Bolívar and Amazonas states, in Colombia from eastern Caquetá Department east through Vaupés and Guainía departments, and in extreme northwestern Brazil in the upper basin of the Rio Negro. Subspecies H. f. perflava is found northern and central Roraima in northwestern Brazil. The species inhabits the edges of terra firme and várzea evergreen forest, mature secondary woodland, and shrubby borders of savanna woodland. It also occurs within the forest along watercourses and at gaps caused by fallen trees. In elevation it occurs mostly below about 600 m (2,000 ft), though it reaches only 200 m (700 ft) in Colombia and is found as high as 1,200 m (3,900 ft) in a few locations.

== Behavior ==
=== Movement ===
The Imeri warbling antbird is believed to be a year-round resident throughout its range.

=== Feeding ===
The Imeri warbling antbird's diet and foraging behavior are not known in detail, but it feeds primarily on insects and spiders. It typically forages by itself, in pairs, or in family groups and only occasionally joins mixed-species feeding flocks. It forages mostly in dense vegetation such as vine tangles, understorey shrubs, bamboo thickets, and among epiphyte cluster on tree trunks and branches. It takes most of its prey by reaching or lunging from a perch and also makes short sallies to overhanging vegetation. It regularly follows army ant swarms, though it defers to obligate ant followers.

=== Breeding ===
The Imeri warbling antbird's breeding season has not been defined but includes March. Nothing else is known about its breeding biology.

=== Vocalization ===
The male Imeri warbling antbird's song has been written as "tew, tew-tzew-tzew-tzew-tur paw, paw". The female typically answers with "6–9 notes ... that descend in frequency". The most common call produced by the species is "a medium-to-long, clear note followed by 3–9 abrupt, sharply downslurred notes ... e.g. 'wur-tew ...' or 'wur-tew-tew ...'". It also makes "a sharp 'chit'".

== Status ==
The IUCN has assessed the Imeri warbling antbird as being of Least Concern. It has a large range; its population size is not known but is believed to be decreasing. No immediate threats have been identified. It is considered fairly common to common in most of its range and occurs in several protected areas.
