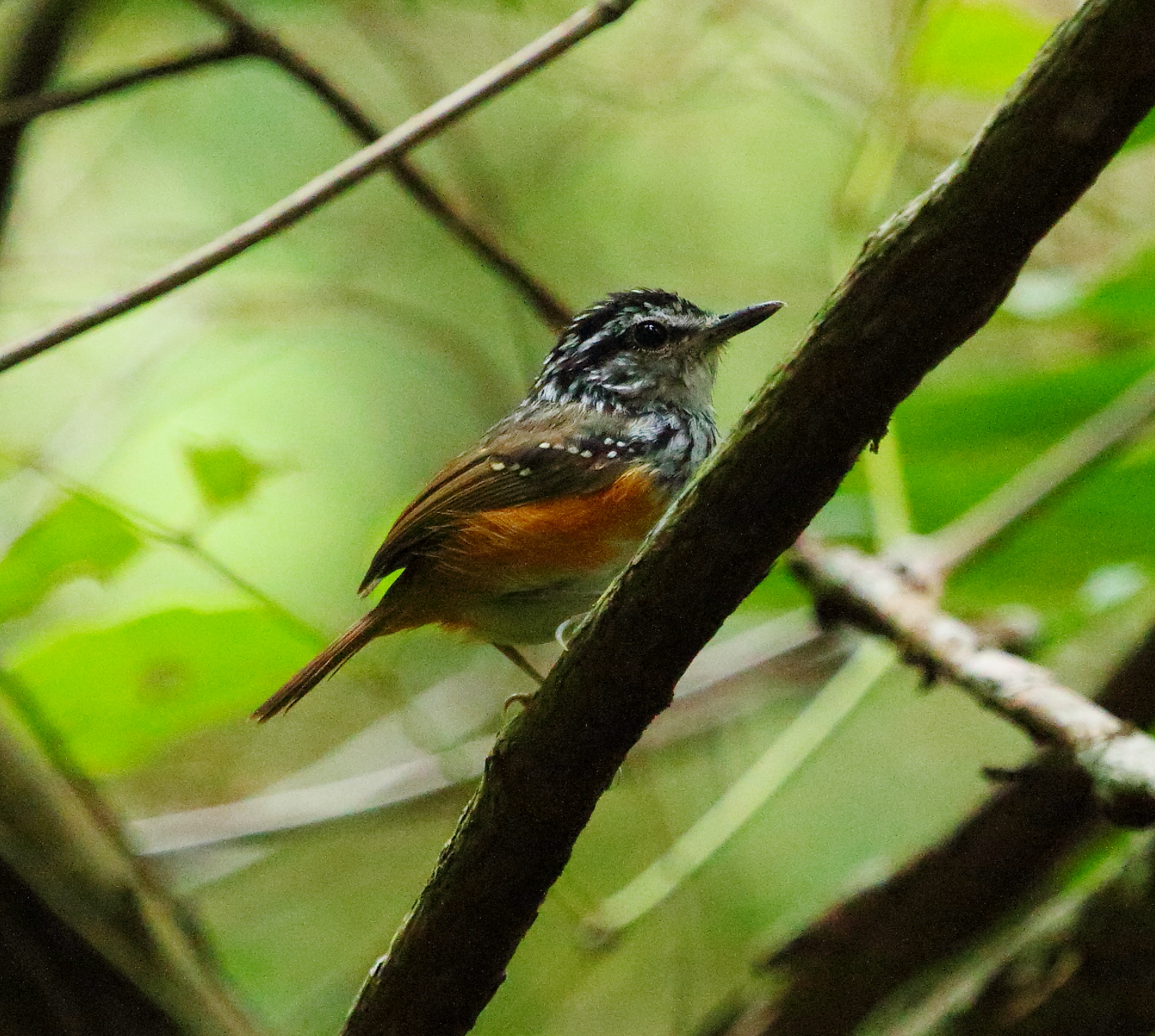
- Guianan warbling antbird (Hypocnemis cantator)

Scientific classification
- Kingdom: Animalia
- Phylum: Chordata
- Class: Aves
- Order: Passeriformes
- Family: Thamnophilidae
- Genus: Hypocnemis; Cabanis, 1847

Type species
- Formicarius cantator Boddaert, 1783

= Hypocnemis =

Genus of birds

Hypocnemis is a genus of passerine birds in the antbird family (Thamnophilidae) in tropical South America. The eight species, distinguishable mainly by songs and calls, inhabit the forest understory, feeding on insects and other arthropods.

== Etymology ==
The genus Hypocnemis was introduced by the German ornithologist Jean Cabanis in 1847. The name combines the Ancient Greek words hupo "somewhat like" and knēmis "leggings" The type species is Hypocnemis cantator, the Guianan warbling antbird.

The English common names for members of the genus end with "warbling antbird" (or "warbling-antbird") in some sources and "antwarbler" in others.

== Taxonomy ==
Prior to 2007, there were only two recognized species in the genus, the yellow-browed antbird (H. hypoxantha) and the warbling antbird (H. cantator sensu lato). In 2007, Isler raised six subspecies of the warbling antbird to full species level; this group is referred to as the Hypocnemis cantator species complex.

This taxonomic revision was based on songs and calls; members of the species complex have vocal differences comparable to sympatric species pairs elsewhere in the family Thamnophilidae. Some sympatric pairs differ markedly in their common calls (short calls given by both males and females): these calls likely contribute to reproductive isolation.

An additional member of the H. cantator species complex, Manicoré warbling antbird (H. rondoni) was defined in 2013; previously it had been considered a subspecies of Spix's warbling antbird (H. striata).

== Hypocnemis species information table ==
Image	Common name	Scientific name	Distribution	Map
	Guianan warbling antbird	Hypocnemis cantator	Venezuela, French Guiana, Guyana, Suriname, Brazil	
	Imeri warbling antbird	Hypocnemis flavescens	Venezuela, Columbia, Brazil	
	Peruvian warbling antbird	Hypocnemis peruviana	Columbia, Ecuador, Peru, Brazil, Bolivia	
	Spix's warbling antbird	Hypocnemis striata	Brazil	
	Yellow-breasted warbling antbird	Hypocnemis subflava	Peru, Bolivia, Brazil	
	Rondônia warbling antbird	Hypocnemis ochrogyna	Bolivia, Brazil	
	Manicoré warbling antbird	Hypocnemis rondoni	Brazil	
	Yellow-browed antbird	Hypocnemis hypoxantha	Columbia, Ecuador, Peru, Brazil	

== Evolutionary history ==
The Amazon River and its tributaries (such as the Rio Negro and the Rio Branco) separate some Hypocnemis species. These geographical boundaries are thought to have contributed to species differentiation less than 2 million years ago. A study which tested the ability of Amazonian birds to cross rivers found that antbirds in general were among the least capable: the study included H. cantator and H. flavescens, both scored as unsuccessful. Molecular studies on river-based vicariance for Amazonian birds show genetic divergences across river barriers, correlating with vocal and plumage differences.

Other speciation mechanisms may be involved for sympatric species pairs. First-generation and backcross hybrids of H. striata and H. ochrogyna were found in their area of overlap, but second generation hybrids were rare. Little gene flow was detected between the two species, indicating that post-zygotic isolation is a factor in keeping the species separate. When species ranges overlap, habitat specialization may also contribute to maintaining species separation. H. subflava and H. peruviana are found in close proximity, even holding adjacent territories, but H. subflava prefers bamboo and H. peruviana non-bamboo habitat in the area of overlap.

Mitochondrial DNA analysis suggests that some Hypocnemis speciation events are ancient. H. cantator sensu lato and H. hypoxantha mtDNA show a 9.3% genetic distance, comparable to the 7.2% between species in their sister genus, Drymophila. This study also found 5.7% genetic distance between two birds collected 350 km apart in continuous forest.

== Distribution and habitat ==
Most Hypocnemis species inhabit moist forest and seasonally flooded forests or swamps. While they often favour breaks in the canopy due to fallen trees or streams, H. cantator prefer forest edges. They are lowland birds; H. hypoxantha and H. striata are found at up to 800–900 metres (2,600–3,000 ft) elevation, and the others up to 1,300–1,400 metres (4,300–4,600 ft).

== Behaviour ==
Both males and females of Hypocnemis species produce sex-specific songs as well as shared common calls. Males initiate duets to which females respond.

A song-playback study in H. cantator sensu lato showed that among paired birds, both males and females reacted most to songs indicating a lone same-sex intruder, and neither reacted to songs indicating paired intruders, suggesting that songs are involved in mate defense rather than territory defense.

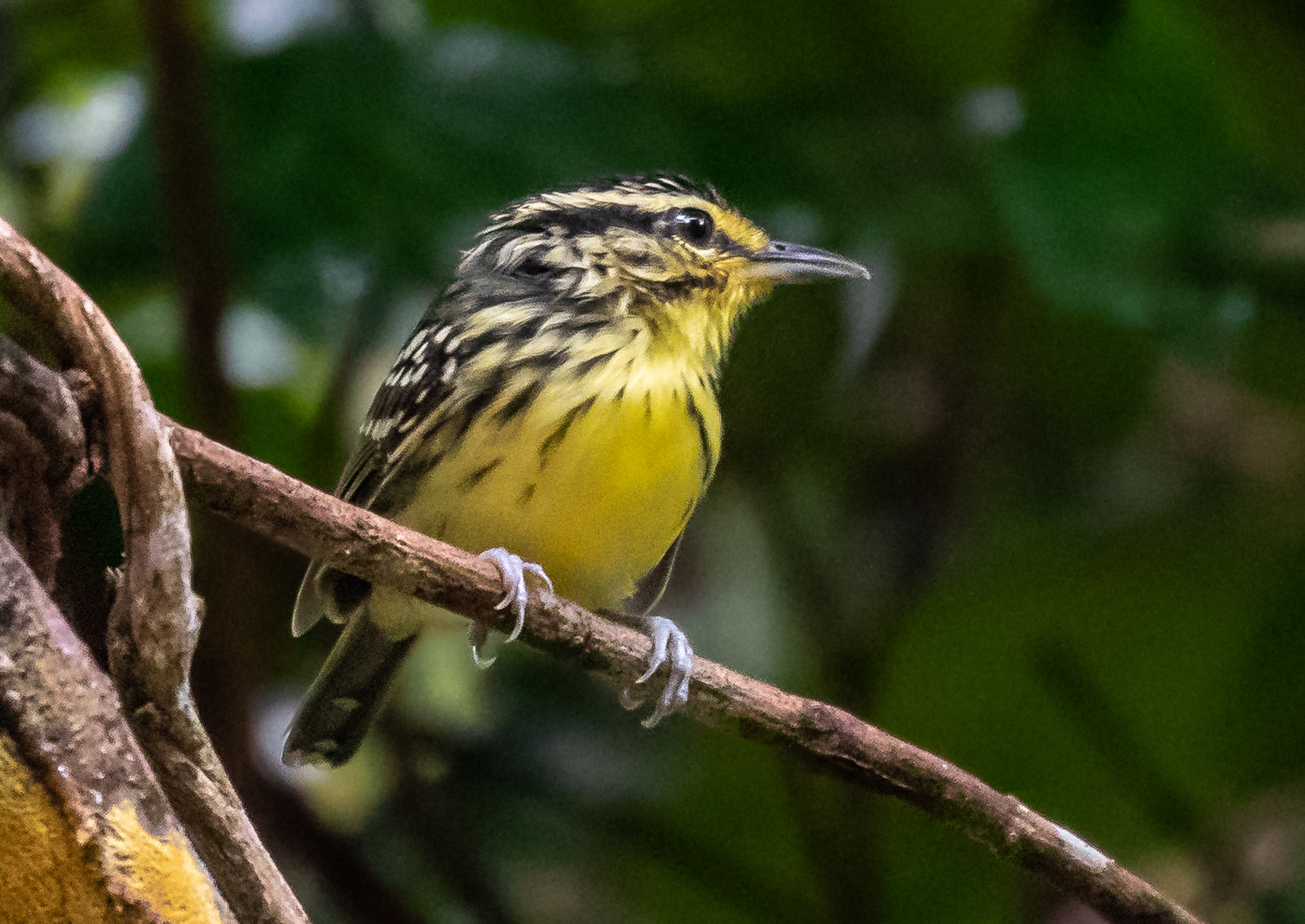
The yellow-browed antbird (H. hypoxantha) forages alone or in pairs

Hypocnemis species forage in the forest understory, feeding on insects and other arthropods. At least four species have been observed to follow army ant swarms to capture prey disturbed by the ants: H. subflava, H. peruviana, H. cantator, and H. flavescens. All four are noted to back off when obligate ant-following birds arrive.

Hypocnemis construct pouch-shaped nests which are similar among the species, though egg colour varies. In H. subflava, both parents participate actively in incubation and chick-rearing.

== Conservation status ==
Most members of the genus are classed as Least concern, but all except H. cantator have decreasing populations.

H. ochrogyna is classed as Vulnerable based on loss of over 30% of its population in the last three generations due to deforestation and habitat fragmentation. The Brazilian state of Rondônia, containing the majority of this bird's range, lost 28% of its humid forest area between 2002 and 2025.

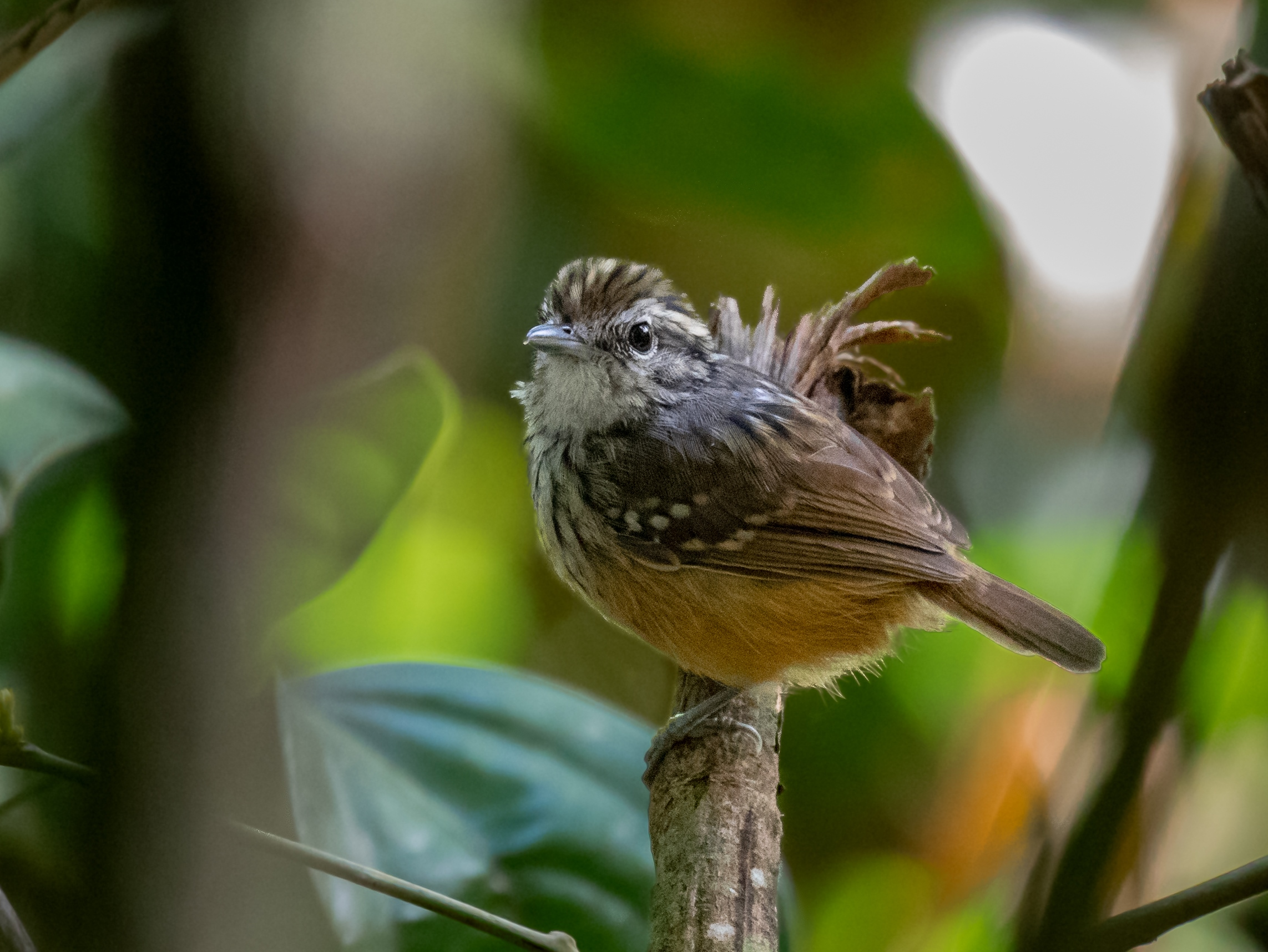
Rondônia warbling antbird (H. ochrogyna) is Vulnerable due to deforestation

BirdLife rates the dependency on forest as Medium for H. cantator and H. hypoxantha, but High for the other six species. A study of stress hormone levels in feathers found that H. cantator confined to smaller islands of habitat show increased stress compared to ones living in large islands or continuous forests.

Common name	Scientific name	IUCN Status	Population Trend	Threats
Guianan warbling antbird	Hypocnemis cantator	Least Concern	Stable	Deforestation, habitat fragmentation
Imeri warbling antbird	Hypocnemis flavescens	Least Concern	Decreasing	No information
Peruvian warbling antbird	Hypocnemis peruviana	Least Concern	Decreasing	No information
Spix's warbling antbird	Hypocnemis striata	Least Concern	Decreasing	Forest loss and disturbance
Yellow-breasted warbling antbird	Hypocnemis subflava	Least Concern	Decreasing	No information
Rondonia warbling antbird	Hypocnemis ochrogyna	Vulnerable	Decreasing	Deforestation, fragmentation
Manicoré warbling antbird	Hypocnemis rondoni	Least Concern	Decreasing	Possibly road construction and fragmentation
Yellow-browed antbird	Hypocnemis hypoxantha	Least Concern	Decreasing	No information
