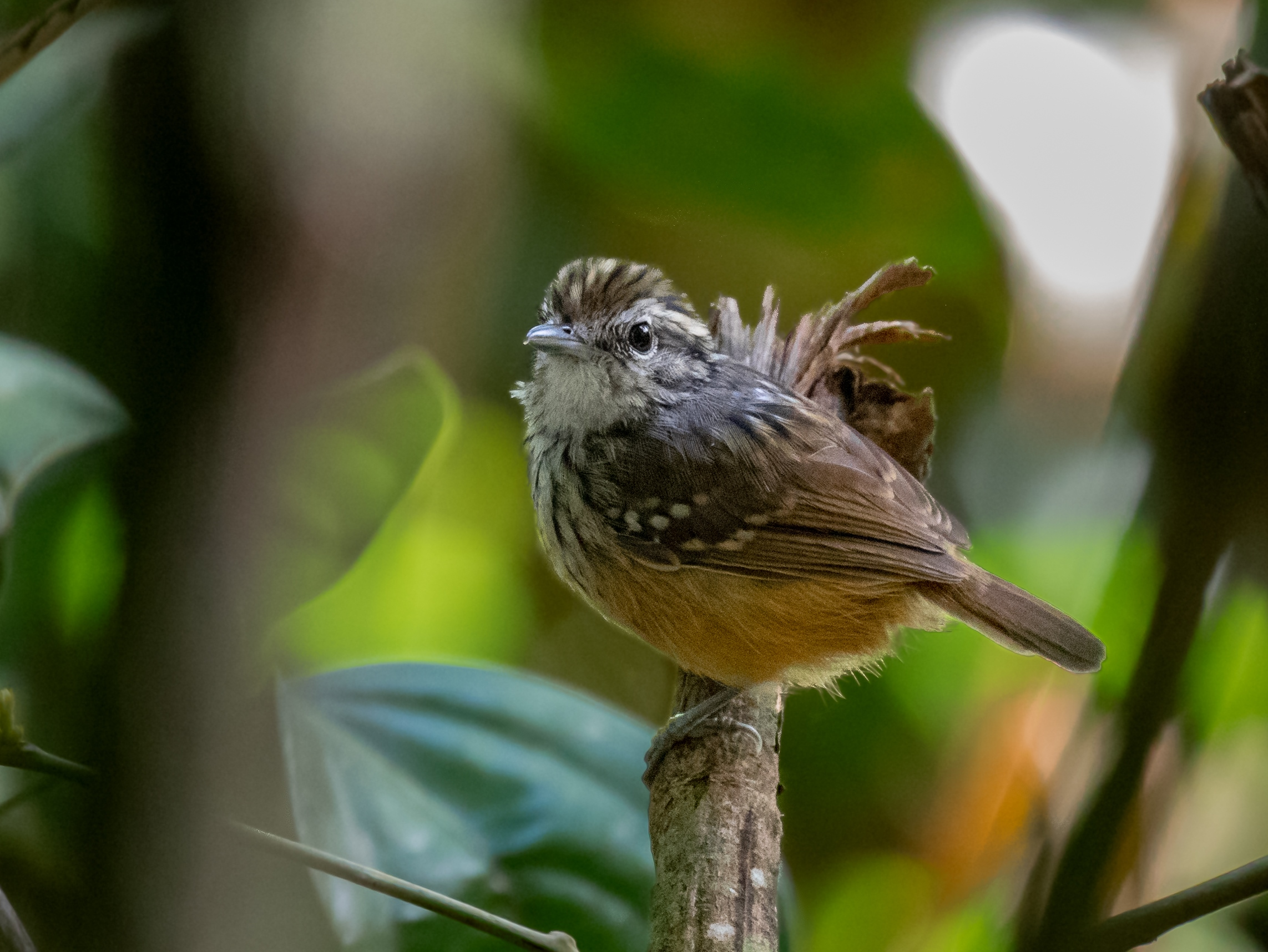
- Female

Conservation status
- Vulnerable (IUCN 3.1)

Scientific classification
- Kingdom: Animalia
- Phylum: Chordata
- Class: Aves
- Order: Passeriformes
- Family: Thamnophilidae
- Genus: Hypocnemis
- Species complex: Hypocnemis cantator complex
- Species: H. ochrogyna

Binomial name
- Hypocnemis ochrogyna Zimmer, 1932

Synonyms
- Hypocnemis cantator ochrogyna

= Rondonia warbling antbird =

Species of bird

The Rondonia warbling antbird or Rondonia antwarbler, (Hypocnemis ochrogyna) is a Vulnerable species of bird in subfamily Thamnophilinae of family Thamnophilidae, the "typical antbirds". It is found in Bolivia and Brazil.

== Taxonomy and systematics ==
The Rondonia warbling antbird was described by the American ornithologist John T. Zimmer in 1932 as a subspecies of the then warbling antbird Hypocnemis cantator sensu lato. Following a study published in 2007 that assessed vocal differences and to a lesser degree differences in plumages among the warbling antbird's subspecies, it and several others were elevated to full species status. The Rondonia warbling antbird is monotypic.

== Description ==
The Rondonia warbling antbird is 11 to 12 cm (4.3 to 4.7 in) long and weighs 11 to 15 g (0.39 to 0.53 oz). Adult males have a black crown with a white central streak and a white supercilium on an otherwise black and white speckled face. Their upperparts are olive-gray with a white patch between the scapulars; the center of the patch has black and white speckles. Their rump is rufous. Their flight feathers are brown with yellowish olive-brown edges and their wing coverts black with white tips. Their tail is brown with pale buff tips to the feathers. Their throat is very pale gray. Their breast and sides are spotted with black and white, their belly's center is white, and their flanks and undertail coverts are rufous. Females have the same pattern but different colors than males. Their crown is streaked with pale buff, their back is lightly streaked pale ochraceous-brown, the interscapular patch is small or absent, and their wing coverts are olive-brown with pale buff tips.

== Distribution and habitat ==
Its range extends from the rio Madeira to rio Roosevelt (in the western Brazilian states of Rondônia and Mato Grosso and the eastern Bolivian departments of Beni and Santa Cruz). It primarily inhabits terra firme evergreen forest, and also várzea, adjacent mature secondary woodland, and the ecotone between forest and savannah. It mostly occurs in dense understorey vegetation at forest edges and within the forest at gaps caused by fallen trees. In elevation it ranges as high as 1,300 m (4,300 ft).

== Behavior ==
=== Movement ===
The Rondonia warbling antbird is believed to be a year-round resident throughout its range.

=== Feeding ===
The Rondonia warbling antbird's diet and foraging behavior are not known, but are assumed to be very similar to those of its previous "parent" Hypocnemis cantator.

=== Breeding ===
Nothing is known about the Rondonia warbling antbird's breeding biology.

=== Vocalization ===
The male Rondonia warbling antbird's song is even-paced, starting with a long note followed by four to six shorter clear notes. The female's song "starts with a long note and ends in an abrupt note". The species' most common call is described as similar to that of the Guianan warbling antbird ("a brief repetitive series of 2–4 (typically three) similar, clear notes of essentially level peak frequencies, with the final notes often becoming raspy"). However, "each note also becomes shorter and usually more raspy". It also makes an "abrupt 'chit'".

== Status ==
The IUCN originally in 2009 assessed the Rondonia warbling antbird as being of Least Concern but in 2017 uplisted it to Vulnerable. Its estimated population of 500,000 to one million mature individuals is decreasing at a significant rate. "The main threat to this species is forest clearance for agriculture and cattle ranching. An estimated 60% of the species's habitat within its range has been lost in the last 40 years. The species appears to be sensitive to fragmentation." It is considered fairly common to common and occurs in several protected areas. However, it is considered Vulnerable by Brazilian authorities.
