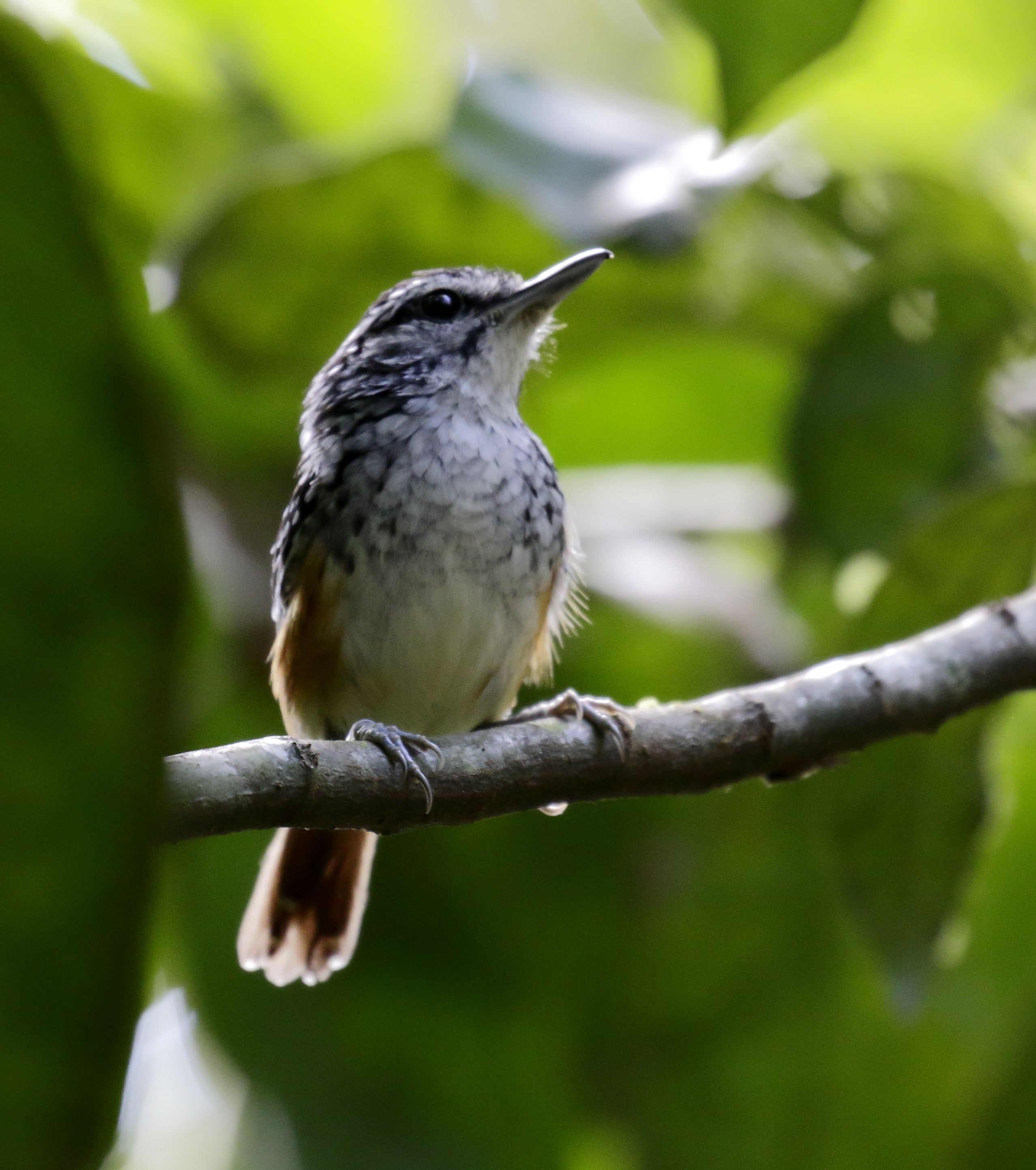

Conservation status
- Least Concern (IUCN 3.1)

Scientific classification
- Kingdom: Animalia
- Phylum: Chordata
- Class: Aves
- Order: Passeriformes
- Family: Thamnophilidae
- Genus: Hypocnemis
- Species complex: Hypocnemis cantator complex
- Species: H. peruviana

Binomial name
- Hypocnemis peruviana Taczanowski, 1884

Synonyms
- Hypocnemis cantator peruviana and Hypocnemis cantator saturata

= Peruvian warbling antbird =

Species of bird

The Peruvian warbling antbird or Peruvian antwarbler, (Hypocnemis peruviana) is a species of bird in subfamily Thamnophilinae of family Thamnophilidae, the "typical antbirds". It is found in Bolivia, Brazil, Colombia, Ecuador, and Peru.

== Taxonomy and systematics ==
The Peruvian warbling antbird was long considered a subspecies of the then warbling antbird Hypocnemis cantator sensu lato. Following a study published in 2007 that assessed vocal differences and to a lesser degree differences in plumages among the warbling antbird's subspecies, it and several others were elevated to full species status.

The Peruvian warbling antbird's further taxonomy is unsettled. The International Ornithological Committee and the Clements taxonomy assign it two subspecies, the nominate H. p. peruviana (Taczanowski, 1884) and H. p. saturata (Carriker, 1930). However, BirdLife International's Handbook of the Birds of the World does not recognize saturata but treats what it calls the "Peruvian antwarbler" as monotypic.

This article follows the two-subspecies model.

== Description ==
The Peruvian warbling antbird is 11 to 12 cm (4.3 to 4.7 in) long. Adult males of the nominate subspecies have a black crown with a white central streak and a white supercilium on an otherwise black and white speckled face. Their upperparts are grayish brown with a white patch between the scapulars and much black and white speckling. Their rump is rufous. Their flight feathers are brown with yellowish olive-brown edges and their wing coverts black with white tips. Their tail is brown with pale buff tips to the feathers. Their throat and breast are white with many dark spots. Their central belly is whitish and their flanks and undertail coverts are deep rufous. Females have the same pattern but different colors than males. Their upperparts are heavily marked with dusky and buff. Subspecies H. p. saturata has essentially the same plumage as the nominate but is somewhat darker overall.

== Distribution and habitat ==
The nominate subspecies of the Peruvian warbling antbird is found from eastern Peru south of the Amazon into northern Bolivia and southwestern Amazonian Brazil. Subspecies H. p. saturata is found from southern Colombia south through eastern Ecuador into northeastern Peru and east into west-central Amazonian Brazil. In Brazil the species' eastern border is the Rio Madeira. In southern Peru its range overlaps that of the yellow-breasted warbling antbird (H. subflava). The species primarily inhabits the edges and gaps in várzea and igapó evergreen forest, mature secondary forest, and forest along watercourses in more open landscapes. To a lesser extent it inhabits terra firme forest and somewhat open woodlands.

== Behavior ==
=== Movement ===
The Peruvian warbling antbird is believed to be a year-round resident throughout its range.

=== Feeding ===
The Peruvian warbling antbird's diet and foraging behavior are not known in detail, but it feeds primarily on insects and spiders. It typically forages by itself, in pairs, or in family groups and only occasionally joins mixed-species feeding flocks. It forages mostly in dense vegetation such as vine tangles, understorey shrubs, bamboo thickets, and among epiphyte cluster on tree trunks and branches. It takes most of its prey by reaching or lunging from a perch and also makes short sallies to overhanging vegetation. It regularly follows army ant swarms, though it defers to obligate ant followers.

=== Breeding ===
The Peruvian warbling antbird's breeding season has not been defined but appears to span April to December in Ecuador and from at least September to November in Peru. Its nest has not been described. The usual clutch is two eggs which are pinkish with purple streaks and spots. The incubation period, time to fledging, and details of parental care are not known.

=== Vocalization ===
The male Peruvian warbling antbird's song is "not at all warbling...a raspy, almost snarling 'peér, peer-peer-peer-peer-pur-pur-pyur' with descending effect". Females reply with a "shorter, higher-pitched version" that may start during the male's song. Both sexes give "wur-cheeé or wur-cheeé-cheeé" calls.

== Status ==
The IUCN has assessed the Peruvian warbling antbird as being of Least Concern. It has a large range; its population size is not known but is believed to be decreasing. No immediate threats have been identified. It is considered fairly common to common in most of its range and occurs in several protected areas.
