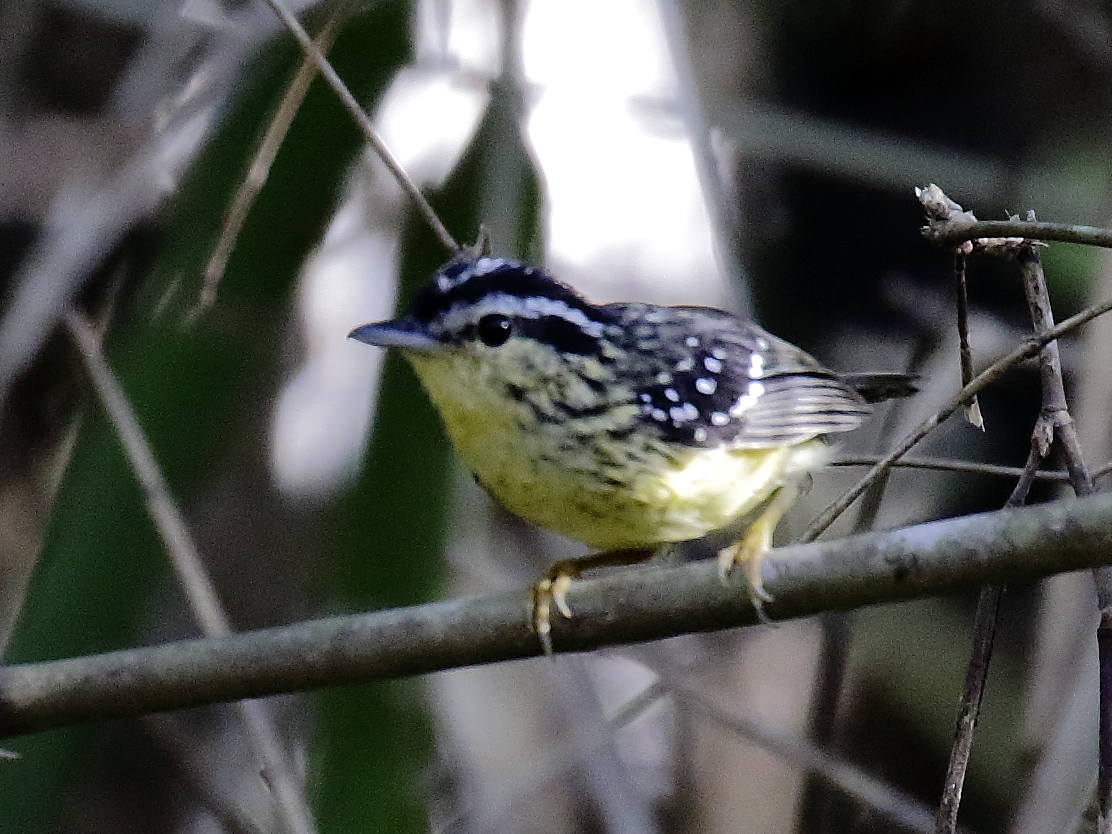

Conservation status
- Least Concern (IUCN 3.1)

Scientific classification
- Kingdom: Animalia
- Phylum: Chordata
- Class: Aves
- Order: Passeriformes
- Family: Thamnophilidae
- Genus: Hypocnemis
- Species complex: Hypocnemis cantator complex
- Species: H. subflava

Binomial name
- Hypocnemis subflava Cabanis, 1873

Synonyms
- Hypocnemis cantator subflava and Hypocnemis cantator collinsi

= Yellow-breasted warbling antbird =

Species of bird

The yellow-breasted warbling antbird or yellow-breasted antwarbler, (Hypocnemis subflava) is a species of bird in subfamily Thamnophilinae of family Thamnophilidae, the "typical antbirds". It is found in Bolivia, Brazil, and Peru.

== Taxonomy and systematics ==
The yellow-breasted warbling antbird was described by the German ornithologist Jean Cabanis in 1873 and given its current binomial name Hypocnemis subflava. It was later, and for a long time, considered a subspecies of the then warbling antbird Hypocnemis cantator sensu lato. Following a study published in 2007 that assessed vocal differences and to a lesser degree differences in plumages among the warbling antbird's subspecies, it and several others were elevated to full species status.

The yellow-breasted warbling antbird has two subspecies, the nominate H. s. subflava (Cabanis, 1873) and H. s. collinsi (Cherrie, 1916).

== Description ==
The yellow-breasted warbling antbird is about 12 cm (4.7 in) long and weighs about 14 g (0.49 oz). Adult males of the nominate subspecies have a black crown with a white central streak and a white supercilium on an otherwise black and white speckled face. Their upperparts are gray with a white patch between the scapulars and heavy black and white speckling. Their flight feathers are gray-brown with yellowish olive-brown edges and their wing coverts black with white tips. Their tail is gray-brown with pale buff tips to the feathers. Their underparts are mostly plain yellow with weak rufous flanks and pale buff undertail coverts. Females have the same pattern but different colors than males. Their upperparts are heavily marked with dusky and buff. Subspecies H. s. collinsi has paler gray upperparts than the nominate, with fewer black and white spots; females have pale olive-gray upperparts.

== Distribution and habitat ==
The nominate subspecies of the yellow-breasted warbling antbird is found in the Andean foothills of east-central Peru between the departments of Huánuco and Cuzco. Subspecies H. s. collinsi is found south of the nominate, in southern Peru, Acre state in Brazil, and west-central Bolivia south to Cochabamba Department. The species primarily inhabits the edges, gaps, and watercourses in evergreen forest and also mature secondary forest. Both subspecies favor stands of bamboo to some extent, and in some areas H. s. collinsi is found primarily in bamboo. In most of its range it occurs below 300 m (1,000 ft) of elevation but it reaches 1,600 m (5,200 ft) in southeastern Peru.

== Behavior ==
=== Movement ===
The yellow-breasted warbling antbird is believed to be a year-round resident throughout its range.

=== Feeding ===
The yellow-breasted warbling antbird's diet and foraging behavior are not known in detail, but it feeds primarily on insects and spiders. Its diet and behavior are assumed to be very similar to those of its previous "parent" H. cantator, which see here. It does feed more often at clusters of dead leaves than cantator.

=== Breeding ===
The yellow-breasted warbling antbird's breeding biology is known only from southeastern Peru. Its nesting season there spans August to September. It builds a deep pouch nest from palm fronds, bamboo leaves, other dead leaves, and moss with a lining of dry grass and rootlets. Most nests were suspended between 0.3 and 1.8 m (1 and 6 ft) above the ground. Its eggs are white with highly variable brownish-red or maroon specks and streaks. Both parents incubate during the day and the female alone at night, and both parents brood and provision nestlings. The incubation period is not known; at one nest young fledged 11 days after hatch.

=== Vocalization ===
The yellow-breasted warbling antbird's song is written "chee cher-CHEER-cheer-cher-chrrr" and its call as "hrjzz hrjzzesh".

== Status ==
The IUCN has assessed the yellow-breasted warbling antbird as being of Least Concern. Its population size is not known but is believed to be decreasing. No immediate threats have been identified. It is considered fairly common to common in parts of its range though uncommon to fairly common in Peru. It occurs in several protected areas.
