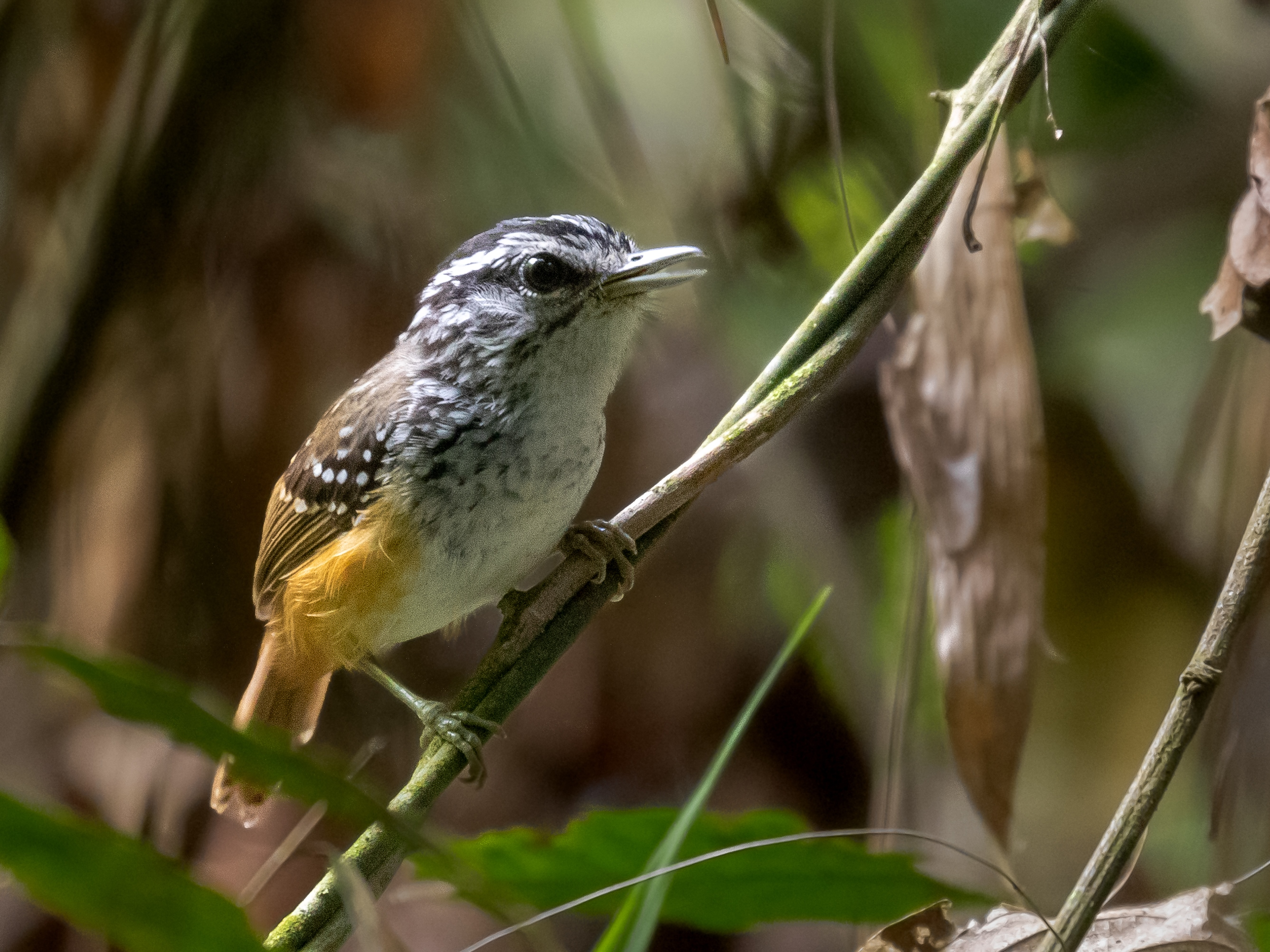

Conservation status
- Least Concern (IUCN 3.1)

Scientific classification
- Kingdom: Animalia
- Phylum: Chordata
- Class: Aves
- Order: Passeriformes
- Family: Thamnophilidae
- Genus: Hypocnemis
- Species complex: Hypocnemis cantator complex
- Species: H. striata

Binomial name
- Hypocnemis striata (Spix, 1825)

Synonyms
- Hypocnemis cantator striata

= Spix's warbling antbird =

Species of bird

Spix's warbling antbird or Spix's antwarbler, (Hypocnemis striata) is a species of bird in subfamily Thamnophilinae of family Thamnophilidae, the "typical antbirds". It is endemic to Amazonian Brazil.

== Taxonomy and systematics ==
Spix's warbling antbird was described and illustrated by the German naturalist Johann Baptist von Spix in 1825 and given the binomial name Thamnophilus striatus. The current genus Hypocnemis was introduced in 1847. It was later, and for a long time, considered a subspecies of the then warbling antbird Hypocnemis cantator sensu lato. Following a study published in 2007 that assessed vocal differences and to a lesser degree differences in plumages among the warbling antbird's subspecies, it and several others were elevated to full species status.

Spix's warbling antbird has three subspecies, the nominate H. s. striata (Spix, 1825), H. s. implicata (Zimmer, JT, 1932), and H. s. affinis (Zimmer, JT, 1932). In the 2007 paper, Isler et al. noted that each might represent a full species but conservatively recommended that they be treated as subspecies pending further investigation. In addition, they suggest that the westernmost population of implicata probably represents a new subspecies or species that they call taxon novum. It awaits a full description.

== Description ==
Spix's warbling antbird is 11 to 12 cm (4.3 to 4.7 in) long and weighs 10 to 14 g (0.35 to 0.49 oz). Adult males of the nominate subspecies have a black crown with a white central streak and a white supercilium on an otherwise black and white speckled face. Their upperparts are olive-gray with a white patch between the scapulars; their nape and back have black and white streaks. Their rump is rufous. Their flight feathers are rufescent brown with yellowish olive-brown edges and their wing coverts black with white tips. Their tail is rufescent brown with pale buff tips to the feathers. Their throat is very pale gray. Their breast and sides are spotted with black and white, their belly's center is white, and their flanks and undertail coverts are rufous. Females have the same pattern but different colors than males. Their crown is streaked with pale buff, the interscapular patch is small or absent, their nape and back are streaked buff, black, and white, and their wing coverts are olive-brown with pale buff tips. Subspecies H. s. implicata is similar to the nominate but less deeply rufescent and with more muted black and white streaking. Males of H. s. affinis are more heavily marked than those of implicata but females are less heavily marked.

== Distribution and habitat ==
Spix's warbling antbird is a resident of Amazonian Brazil south of the Amazon River. Subspecies H. s. implicata is the westernmost; it is found between the rios Madeira and Tapajós and its tributary Teles Pires. The nominate is found from the Tapajos/Teles Pires east to the Rio Xingu and south into north-central Mato Grosso state. H. s. affinis is found from the Xingu east to the Rio Tocantins and south into eastern Mato Grosso. The species inhabits the edges of terra firme and várzea evergreen forest, the transition zone between them, and adjacent mature secondary woodland. It favors the understorey to mid-storey of the forest edges and within the forest along watercourses and at gaps caused by fallen trees. In elevation it ranges up to about 800 m (2,600 ft).

== Behavior ==
=== Movement ===
Spix's warbling antbird is believed to be a year-round resident throughout its range.

=== Feeding ===
The diet and foraging behavior of Spix's warbling antbird are not known in detail, but it feeds primarily on insects and spiders. Its diet and behavior are assumed to be very similar to those of its previous "parent" H. cantator, which see here.

=== Breeding ===
Nothing is known about the breeding biology of Spix's warbling antbird.

=== Vocalization ===
The song of the male Spix's warbling antbird "commences with a long downslurred note followed by an accelerating series of abrupt and also downslurred notes, always numbering at least seven, and usually 9–10". The female's song "is initiated with a long note and ends in an abrupt note". The most common call of the nominate subspecies "comprises a first note that is short and usually shaped like a shallow inverted U, while the following note is raspy and complex, and the third note (if present) is almost always raspy". That of the other two subspecies is "a relatively long whistled note that is flat or nearly so in frequency followed by a distinct interval and an clear, abrupt, downslurred note starting at a higher frequency than the first; the second note is followed immediately by a sharply descending, raspy note that typically starts at an even higher frequency". All three subspecies also give "abrupt 'chit' calls".

== Status ==
The IUCN has assessed Spix's warbling antbird as being of Least Concern. It has a large range; its estimated population of 100,000 to 500,000 mature individuals is believed to be decreasing. "The species is threatened by forest loss and disturbance, largely resulting from agriculture, grazing and selective logging...however, the species is thought to be tolerant of forest areas that have survived fire." It is considered fairly common to common in most of its range though uncommon and local at the eastern edge of it. It occurs in "a fair number" of protected areas.
