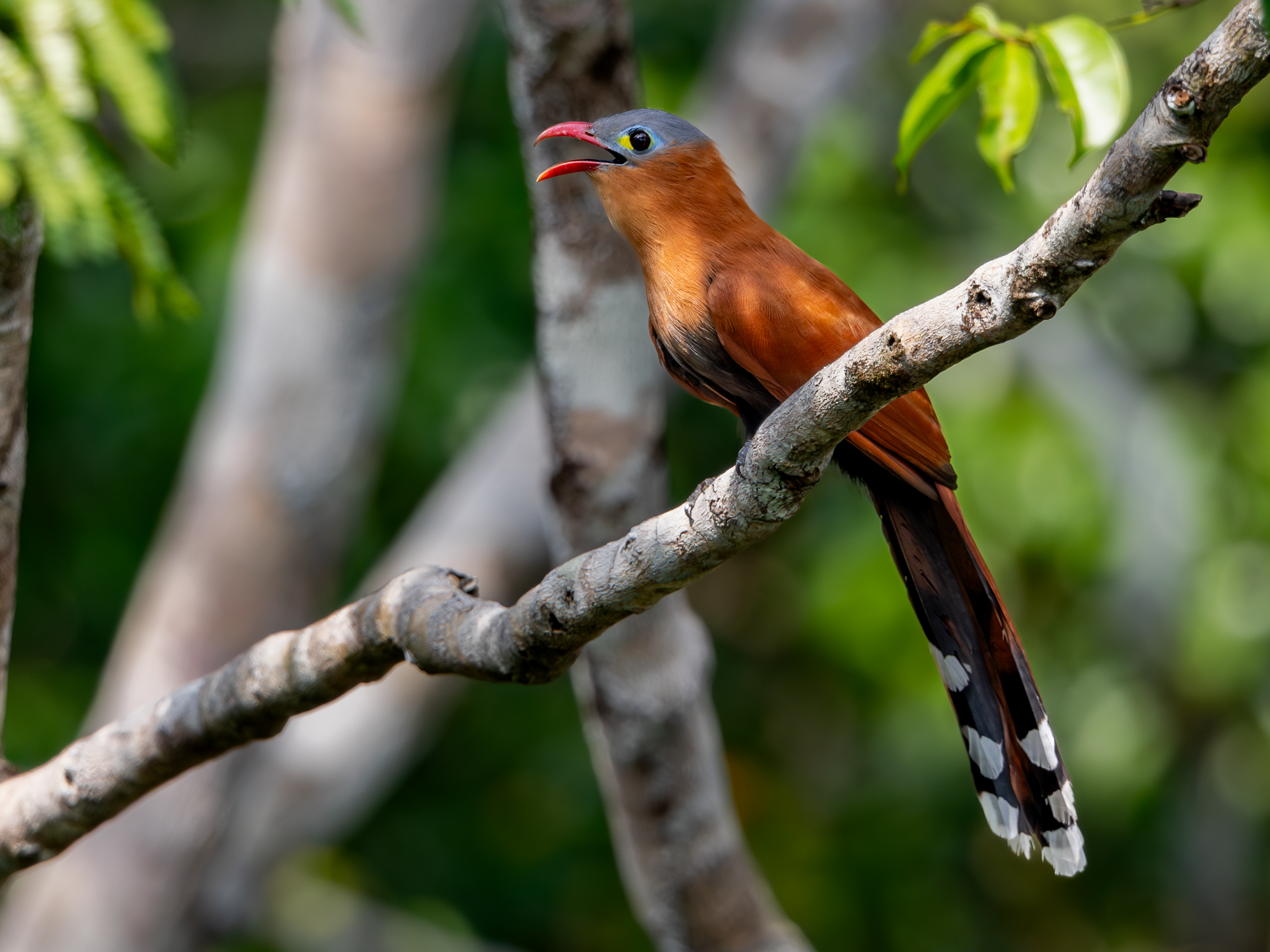
- at Manaus, Amazonas, Brazil

Conservation status
- Least Concern (IUCN 3.1)

Scientific classification
- Kingdom: Animalia
- Phylum: Chordata
- Class: Aves
- Order: Cuculiformes
- Family: Cuculidae
- Genus: Piaya
- Species: P. melanogaster

Binomial name
- Piaya melanogaster (Vieillot, 1817)

= Black-bellied cuckoo =

Species of bird

The black-bellied cuckoo or black-bellied squirrel cuckoo (Piaya melanogaster) is a bird of the family Cuculidae found in the Amazon region. Even though this species has a wide distribution, little is known about its ecology and natural history. The word melanogaster means "black belly"; it has Greek roots, melas meaning "black" and gaster meaning "belly".

== Description ==
The average length of adults is between 38 and 40.5 cm. The beak is of an intense purple/red color, the iris is dark red with a blue orbital skin and one yellow mole at the anterior side of each eye. The head is grey and contrasts with the ruffled back. The throat and chest are brown-reddish, cinnamon color and the belly and undertail coverts are black. The tail is black with conspicuous white stripes. The juveniles resemble adults.

P. melanogaster occurs within the range of the similar squirrel cuckoo (Piaya cayana). Black-bellied cuckoos are distinguished by a dark face and grey crown. The squirrel cuckoo has exposed yellow-greenish skin in the orbital area, the chest plumage is grey and it lacks the characteristic hood of the black-bellied cuckoo.

=== Song ===
Their characteristic song is "dyerií-dyu, dyerií-dyu, dyerií-dyu…" sometimes repeated for a few minutes. It is often difficult to trace their position as they typically remain motionless in the forest when singing. They also produce faint grunts.

=== Phylogeny ===
The genus Playa is considered paraphyletic. The little cuckoo was formerly considered a third member of the genus but has now been placed in the Coccycua.

== Distribution ==
P. melanogaster is a low density species with an Amazonian distribution; it can be found in the upper parts of tropical rainforests and occasionally in savanna forests. It prefers altitudes up to 800 meters above sea level. Is a native species of southern and eastern Guyana, Surinam, French Guiana, eastern Venezuela, Northern Bolivia, Colombia, Ecuador, eastern Perú and Brazil. It is a permanent resident in its range.

In Guyana, the black-bellied cuckoo can be found in Kanashen. In Bolivia it can be found in the department of La Paz. In Colombia it is found from the south of Meta department, the northwest of Guainía department and in southern Vaupés department. In Ecuador it is found below 400 meter above sea level, is infrequently seen in the eastern lowlands. In Brasil this cuckoo is found in the Alta Floresta region at the north of Mato Grosso, in southeastern Amazonia.

=== Population status ===
This species occurs over a wide range and the population appears to be decreasing. Due to the difficulty of population estimation it has not yet met the threshold for vulnerable status and is currently listed as a species of least concern.

== Habitat ==
Black-bellied cuckoos live in tropical rainforests, scrub and occasionally in wooded savannas. They do not frequent open areas, like the squirrel cuckoo does. The black-bellied cuckoo stays at upper levels of the forest. It is estimated that deforestation reduces suitable habitat within its range by about 10% every three generations (approximately 13 years).

== Behavior ==
P. melanogaster prefers forest canopies but can be seen in tall shrubs, climbing on vines, jumping between branches or running between them, and flying in open spaces. Their wing beats are slow and shallow. Individuals are usually alone or in pairs.

=== Reproduction ===
The reproductive cycle of P. melanogaster is little known. There are records of individuals in reproductive condition during the month of April in the Upper Orinoco in Venezuela. In French Guiana nestlings have been seen being fed from July to November. They build their nests in trees and lay up to 2 eggs. The eggs are pure white. The lifespan is 4.2 years.

=== Feeding ===
Their diet is made up of large insects such as beetles, cycads, grasshoppers, ants and caterpillars (even those with sharp hairs). This species feeds in the forest canopy. They also eat small vertebrates such as lizards.
