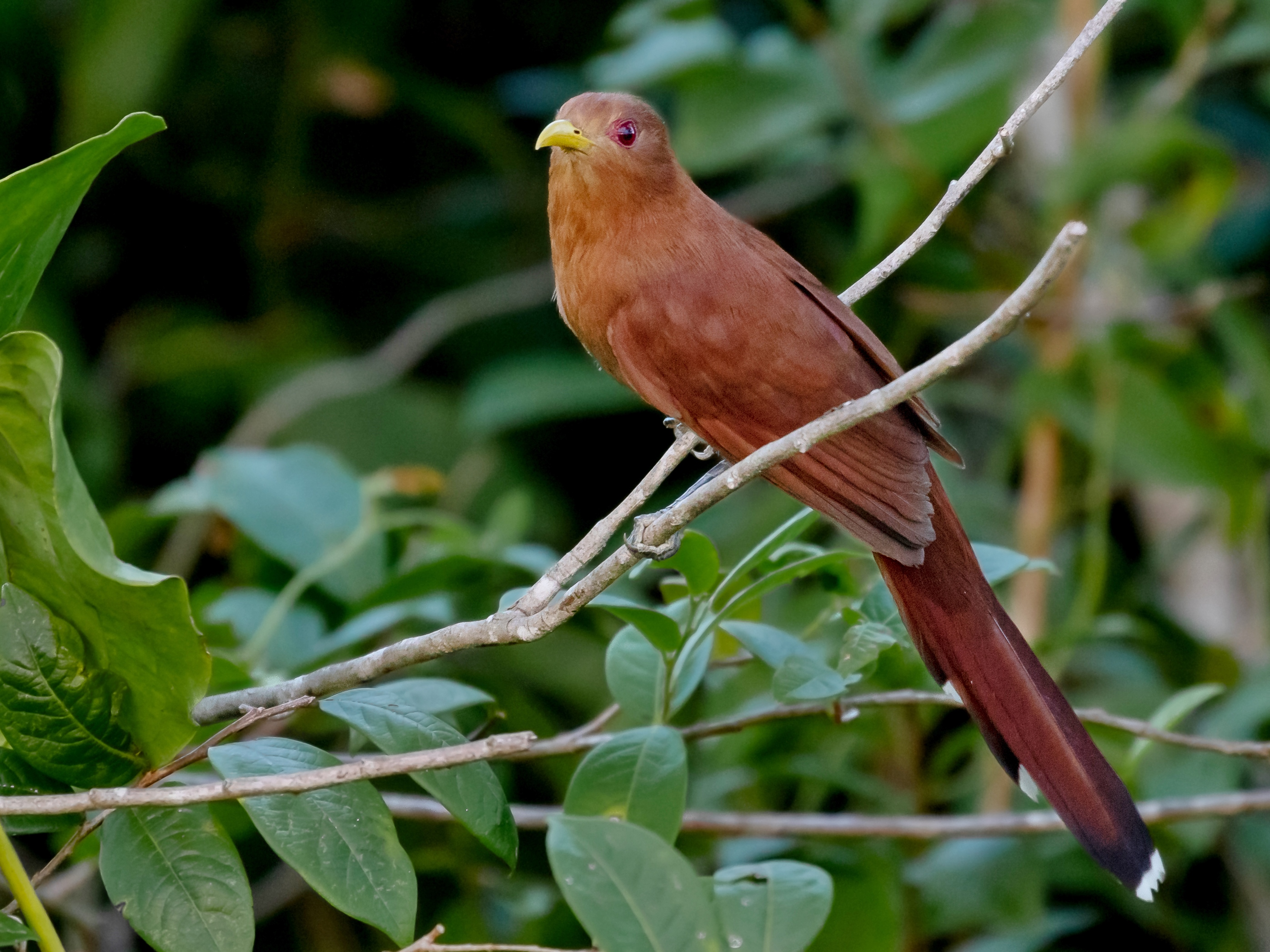

Conservation status
- Least Concern (IUCN 3.1)

Scientific classification
- Kingdom: Animalia
- Phylum: Chordata
- Class: Aves
- Order: Cuculiformes
- Family: Cuculidae
- Genus: Coccycua
- Species: C. minuta

Binomial name
- Coccycua minuta (Vieillot, 1817)

Synonyms
- Coccyzus minutus (protonym); Piaya minuta Vieillot, 1817

= Little cuckoo =

Species of bird

The little cuckoo (Coccycua minuta) is a species of bird in the cuckoo family (Cuculidae) from South America and Panama. It was formerly placed in the genus Piaya, but was moved to the reinstated genus Coccycua following the discovery that its closest living relatives are a couple species traditionally placed in Coccyzus or Micrococcyx, rather than the other members of Piaya.

== Description ==
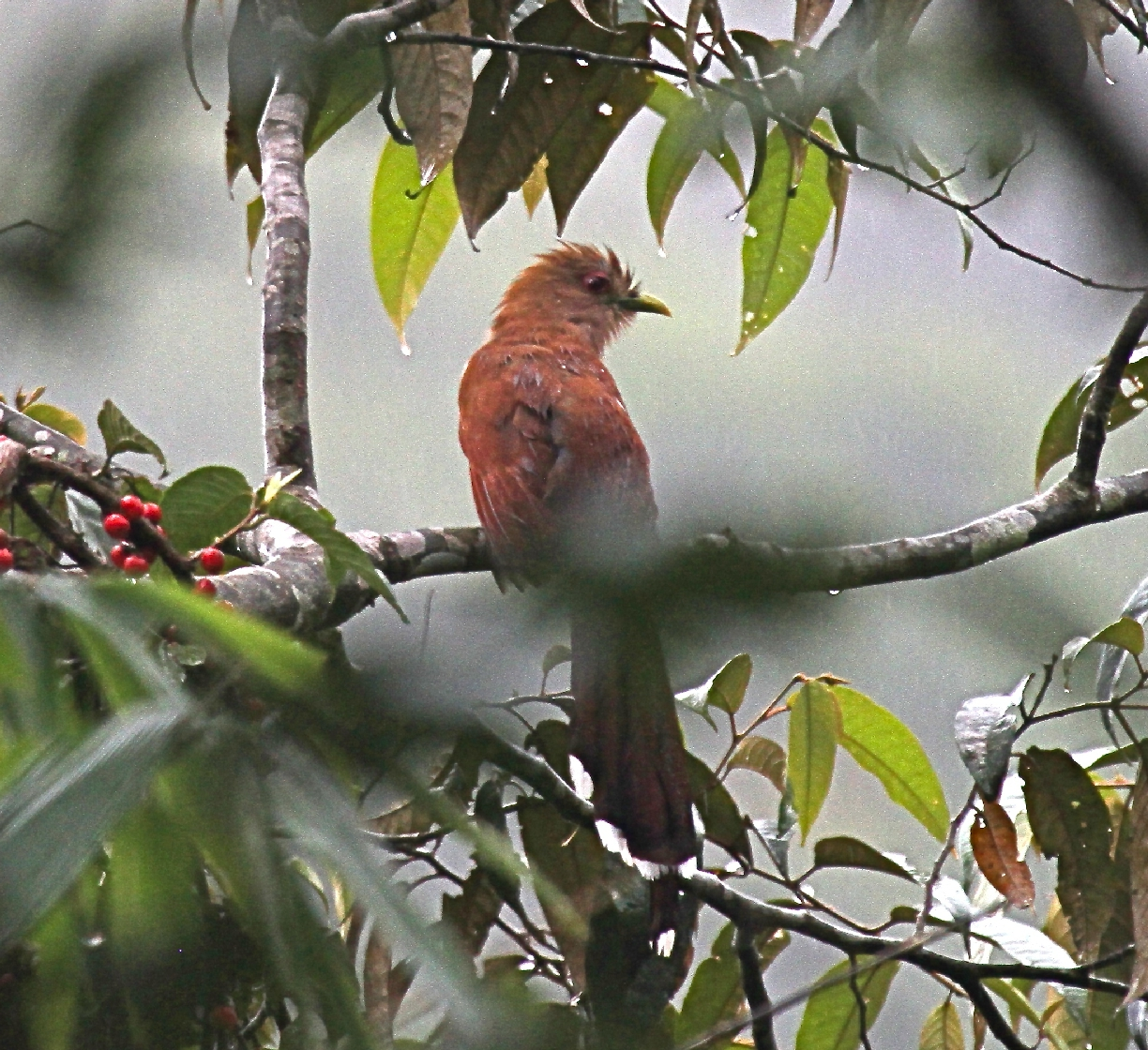
On the road from Atalaya to Cock-of-the-Rock Lodge - Peru

This species is about 27 centimetres (11 in) long and weighs 40 grams (1.4 oz). The adult is mainly chestnut brown, with a greyish lower belly, browner tail and white tips to the tail feathers. The bill is yellow, short, and decurved; the iris of the eyes is red. Immature birds are dark brown with a black bill and no white tail tips. It is smaller and the throat is darker than in the squirrel cuckoo.

The little cuckoo makes harsh chek and kak calls.

== Range, habitat and behavior ==
This small cuckoo occurs from Panama and Trinidad south through Colombia to Bolivia, Peru and Brazil; in Ecuador, it has been recorded as high up as 1,900 metres (6,200 ft) ASL. The little cuckoo is found in mangrove swamps, and scrubby woodland near water. It is generally believed to be an all-year resident, but its irregular occurrence in some areas has led to speculations that it undertakes seasonal short-distance migrations. Fairly widely distributed and not particularly rare, it is not considered a threatened species by the IUCN.

This is a shy species which tends to keep to cover as it forages in low branches for insects and other arthropods. The female lays two white eggs in a deep cup nest in a tree or bamboo. Like most American cuckoos, it incubates the eggs itself.
