= Olivério Pinto =

- Born: Olivério Mário de Oliveira Pinto; 11 March 1896; Jaú, Brazil
- Died: 13 June 1981 (aged 85); Piracicaba, Brazil
- Scientific career
- Fields: Ornithology, Zoology, Medicine
- Workplaces: Instituto Butantan

Olivério Mário de Oliveira Pinto (11 March 1896 – 13 June 1981) was a Brazilian zoologist and physician.

== Life ==
Born in 1896 in the city of Jaú, state of São Paulo, Brazil, Olivério Pinto was the son of Estevam de Oliveira Pinto and Eudóxia Costa de Oliveira Pinto. In 1905, still at an early age, he moved with his family to Salvador. During his basic studies, he already showed a great interest in zoology, but due to the lack of a higher education in natural sciences in the city, he studied medicine at the Faculty of Medicine of Bahia, the first medical school to be founded in Brazil. He concluded his studies in 1921 at the age of 25.

Returning to São Paulo in 1921, Pinto settled in Araraquara and started to work as a physician, founding and directing the first laboratory of clinical analyses in the region. He also taught Natural Sciences at the recently founded School of Odontology and Pharmacy in the city. He married his wife, Alice Alves de Camargo, in 1924.

Pinto started to produce technical drawings for the zoologist Afrânio do Amaral who was at the time the director of the Instituto Butantan. Perceiving Pinto's talent and knowledge, Amaral designated him to the position of researcher in Zoology. In 1939, Pinto became the director of the Zoology Department of São Paulo's Agriculture Secretariat. He retired in 1956, but continued his research.

At the age of 85, Pinto traveled to Águas de São Pedro with his family and started to feel sick. He was hospitalized in Piracicaba and died on 13 June 1981.

== Works ==
Pinto's main work was the Catálogo das Aves do Brasil (Brazil's Catalog of Birds), published between 1938 and 1944 in two volumes with a total of 1266 pages. This was the first work that organized data on names, classification and distribution of Brazilian birds. In 1978 he published an updated version, the Novo Catálogo das Aves do Brazil (Brazil's New Catalog of Birds).
