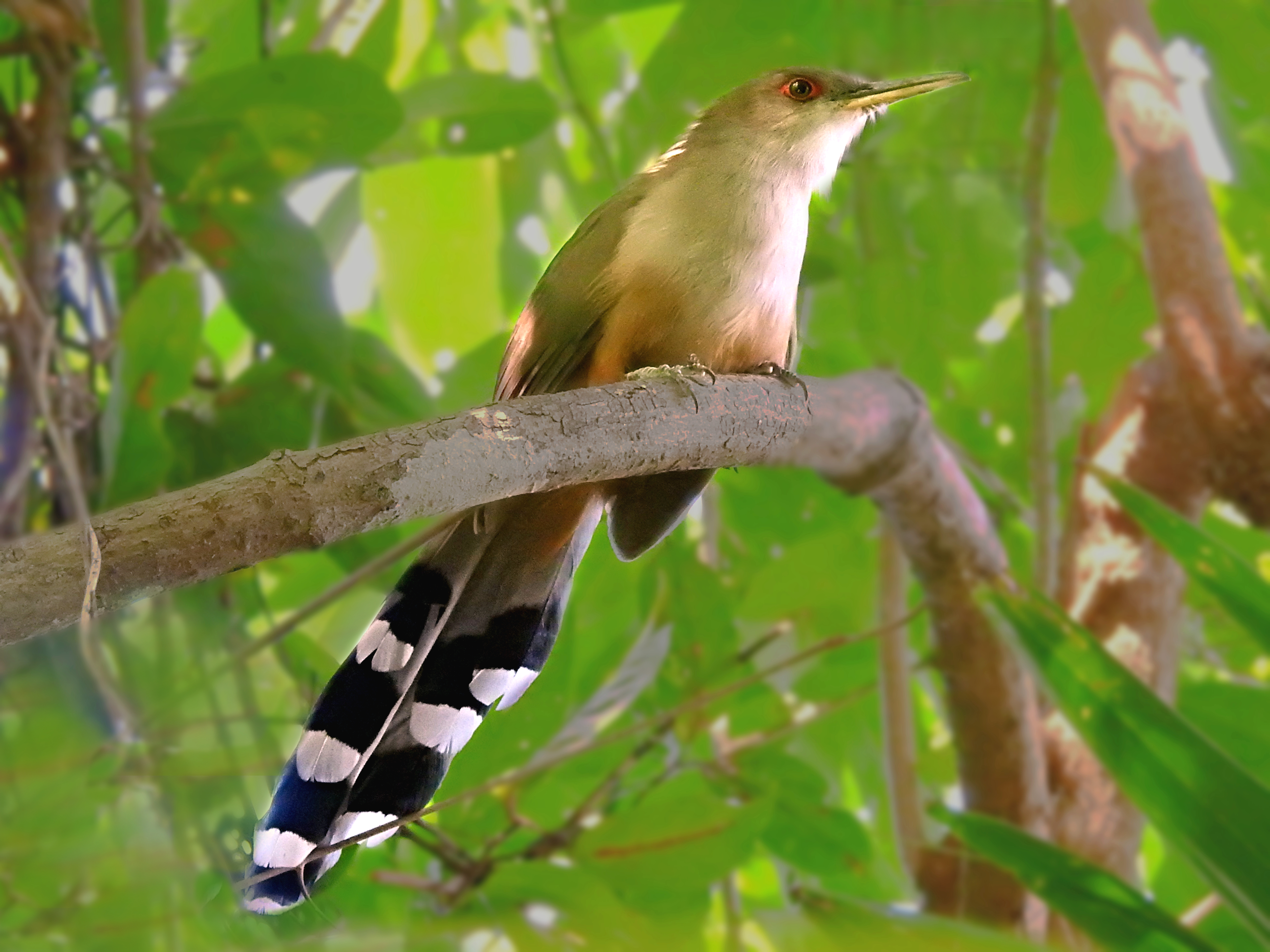

Conservation status
- Least Concern (IUCN 3.1)

Scientific classification
- Kingdom: Animalia
- Phylum: Chordata
- Class: Aves
- Order: Cuculiformes
- Family: Cuculidae
- Genus: Coccyzus
- Species: C. vieilloti

Binomial name
- Coccyzus vieilloti (Bonaparte, 1850)

Synonyms
- Saurothera vieilloti; Vieilloti's Ground Cuckoo

= Puerto Rican lizard cuckoo =

Species of bird

The Puerto Rican lizard cuckoo (Coccyzus vieilloti) is a species of bird in the tribe Phaenicophaeini, subfamily Cuculinae of the cuckoo family Cuculidae. It is endemic to Puerto Rico.

== Taxonomy and nomenclature ==
The Puerto Rican lizard cuckoo and three other lizard cuckoos were for a time considered a single species. Individually they were previously placed in genus Saurothera that was later merged into the current Coccyzus, and they are considered a superspecies. All four of them are found only on islands in the Caribbean. The Puerto Rican lizard cuckoo is monotypic.

The species' specific epithet and the former English name "Vieilloti's Ground Cuckoo" commemorate French ornithologist Louis Pierre Vieillot.

The local Spanish name for the bird, pájaro bobo mayor "greater cuckoo bird", pájaro bobo lit. 'daft or silly bird') refers to its greater size in relation to the other most common native cuckoo, the mangrove cuckoo (Coccyzus minor). It is also called pájaro de lluvia or pájaro de agua ("rain bird") in the belief that its call forecasts rain.

== Description ==
The Puerto Rican lizard cuckoo is 40 to 48 cm (16 to 19 in) long, about half of which is the tail. It has a long decurved bill with a black maxilla and a yellow mandible with a black tip. Both sexes have the same plumage. Adults have entirely gray-brown upperparts. Their throat and breast are gray and the belly and undertail coverts tawny. The upper surface of their tail is gray-brown and the underside gray brown darkening to black near the large white tips. Their eye is surrounded by bare red skin. Juveniles have a cinnamon wash on the breast, less black on the underside of the tail, and an orange-red eye ring.

== Distribution and habitat ==
The Puerto Rican lizard cuckoo is found throughout the main island of Puerto Rico. It might have once resided on Vieques, and a single specimen believed to be a vagrant was once collected on St. Thomas in the American Virgin Islands. It inhabits a variety of forested landscapes including semi-open woodlands, dense montane forest, dry coastal forest, and swamp forest. It is also found in coffee plantations and brushy limestone hills. In elevation it is most common between sea level and 900 m (3,000 ft) but it can also be found almost to the highest peaks of the island.

== Behavior ==
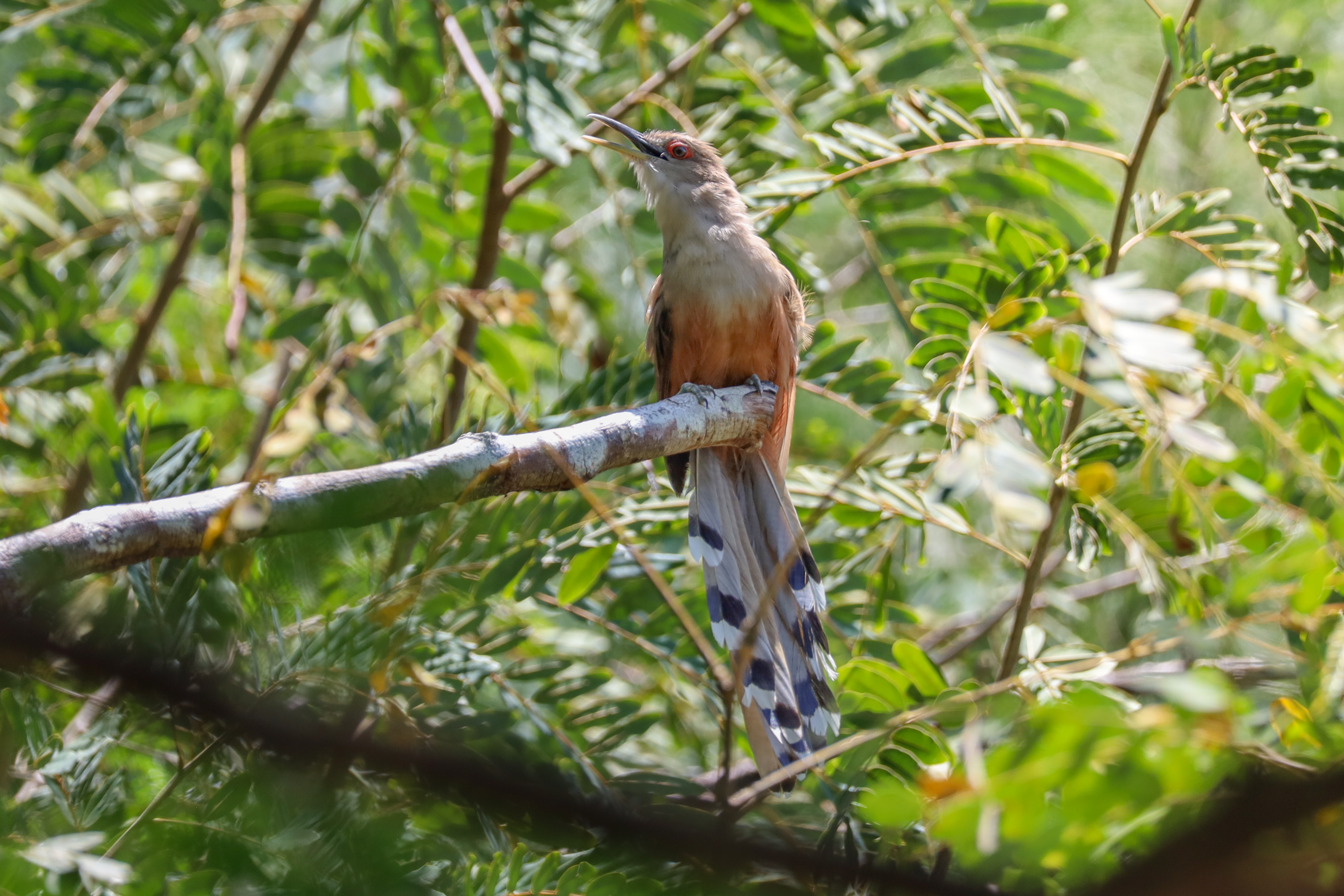
Vocalizing

=== Movement ===
The Puerto Rican lizard cuckoo sits motionless for long periods and is more often heard than seen. It is non-migratory.

=== Feeding ===
The Puerto Rican lizard cuckoo mostly forages for prey from the middle to upper layers of the forest, though it also hunts in the understory and on the ground. It hunts by stealth, climbing along tree branches or walking on the ground. Its principal food is lizards (especially Anolis) and also includes adult and larval insects, eggs, and occasionally frogs.

=== Breeding ===
Almost nothing is known about the Puerto Rican lizard cuckoo's breeding phenology. Its nest is a loose platform made of sticks and placed in a tree or large bush. The clutch size is two or three eggs.

=== Vocalization ===
The Puerto Rican lizard cuckoo's principal call is " a harsh series of ka-ka-ka-ka notes." The call is described in more detail as "an emphatic ka-ka-ka-ka of long duration gradually accelerating and becoming louder, sometimes with altered syllables at the end". The species also makes other calls likened to those of jays, crows, ravens, and doves.

== Status ==
The IUCN has assessed the Puerto Rican lizard cuckoo as being of Least Concern. It has a somewhat restricted range and an estimated population of 2200 to 3000 mature individuals that is believed to be stable. No immediate threats have been identified. Its biology is very poorly known, and "[r]eproductive information, ranging from breeding territoriality and behavior, to reproductive success, is almost non-existent."

== See also ==
- Fauna of Puerto Rico
- List of birds of Puerto Rico
- List of endemic fauna of Puerto Rico
- List of birds of Vieques
- El Toro Wilderness
