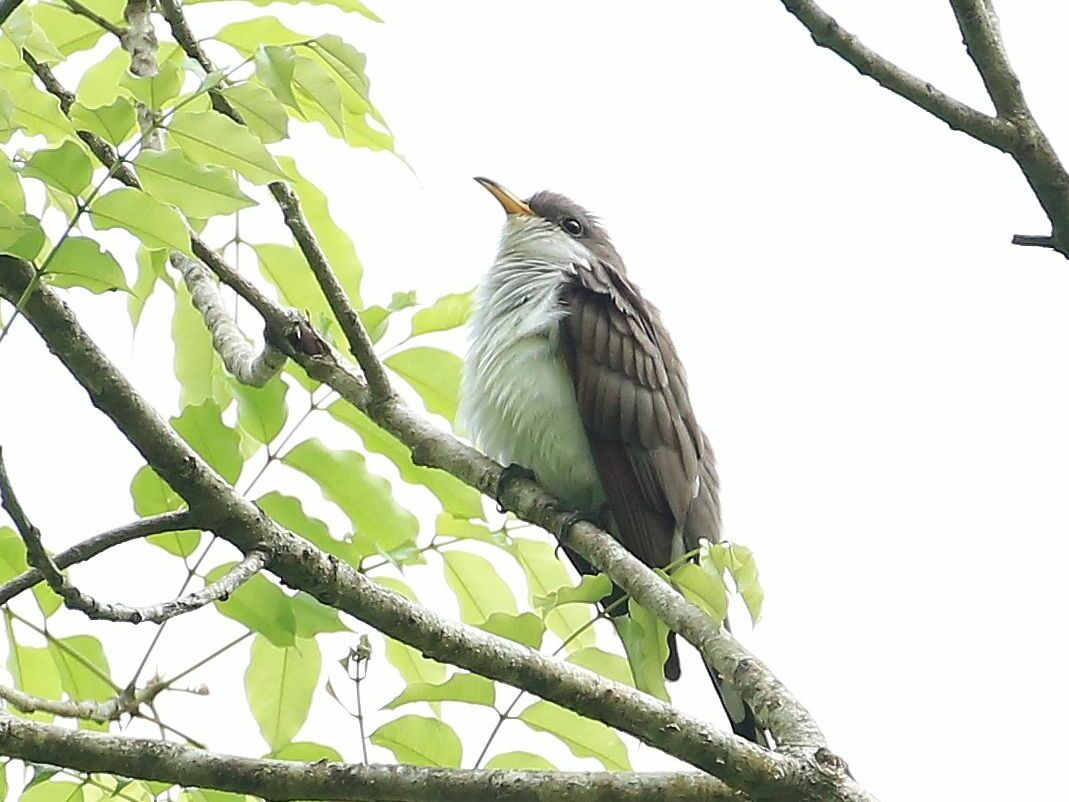

Conservation status
- Least Concern (IUCN 3.1)

Scientific classification
- Kingdom: Animalia
- Phylum: Chordata
- Class: Aves
- Order: Cuculiformes
- Family: Cuculidae
- Genus: Coccyzus
- Species: C. euleri

Binomial name
- Coccyzus euleri Cabanis, 1873

= Pearly-breasted cuckoo =

Species of bird

The pearly-breasted cuckoo (Coccyzus euleri) is a species of bird in the tribe Phaenicophaeini, subfamily Cuculinae of the cuckoo family Cuculidae. It is found in Argentina, Bolivia, Brazil, Ecuador, French Guiana, Guyana, Paraguay, Suriname, Venezuela, and possibly Colombia and Panama.

== Taxonomy and systematics ==
The taxonomic history of the pearly-breasted cuckoo is complicated. For many years it was considered a subspecies of the yellow-billed cuckoo (Coccyzus americanus) due to confusion about the identity of a specimen collected on Sombrero Island in the Lesser Antilles. The specimen was originally described as a species with the binomial C. julieni. The identity of the South American birds bounced between that treatment and treatment as the yellow-billed subspecies before its current designation as C. euleri was settled in 1992.

The pearly-breasted cuckoo is monotypic.

== Description ==
The pearly-breasted cuckoo is 25 to 28 cm (9.8 to 11 in) long, about half of which is the tail. Males weigh about 45 to 53 g (1.6 to 1.9 oz) and females about 54 to 61 g (1.9 to 2.2 oz). Their bill is stout and somewhat decurved. Its maxilla is brown to black with a yellow base and its mandible yellow to orange with a black tip. Males and females have the same plumage. Adults' upperparts are grayish brown with a light bronze gloss. Their wings are grayish brown with white on the primaries' inner webs. The upper surface of their tail is grayish brown; the underside of the central pair of feathers is brownish gray, the next pair blackish with narrow white spots on the tips, and the rest blackish with wide white spots on the tips. Their face has a wide dark gray "mask" past the eye, which is surrounded by a narrow ring of bare skin that is usually black but can be yellow or red. Their underparts are pearly grayish white from throat to breast, the belly white, and the undertail coverts light pearly gray. Juveniles are similar to adults but have fine pale edges on their wings, no facial mask, and only traces of white on the tail.

== Distribution and habitat ==
The pearly-breasted cuckoo nests in Argentina, Brazil, French Guiana, Paraguay, and Venezuela, and is found in Bolivia, Ecuador, Guyana, and Suriname as a non-breeder. A sight record in Colombia leads the South American Classification Committee of the American Ornithological Society (AOS) to class it as hypothetical in that country. A record in Panama has apparently not been accepted by the North American Classification Committee of the AOS.

The pearly-breasted cuckoo inhabits a very wide variety of landscapes, though most are wooded to some degree. Its principal breeding habitats are humid evergreen primary forest, gallery forest, and secondary forest. On much of its wintering grounds it is found in terra firme forest and other types with much Cecropia. On those grounds it can also be found in sandy-soil woodlands, scrublands, mangrove, cerrado, and semi-deciduous forest. The Columbia sighting was in a tropical dry forest and that in Panama in a secondary broadleaf forest. It elevation the species seldom exceeds 900 m (3,000 ft) but has been recorded as high as 1,200 m (3,900 ft).

== Behavior ==
=== Movement ===
The pearly-breasted cuckoo's migration pattern is not fully understood. Those breeding in the southern part of its range (southern Brazil, Argentina, and Paraguay) move north for the austral winter, apparently into Amazonia. Those that breed north of the equator are thought to be non-migratory, but non-breeding season records in Guyana and Suriname may indicate some movement.

=== Feeding ===
The pearly-breasted cuckoo forages for its invertebrate prey from the forest mid-story to the canopy. It feeds primarily on caterpillars. It is usually solitary but sometimes joins mixed-species foraging flocks.

=== Breeding ===
The pearly-breasted cuckoo's breeding phenology is imperfectly understood. Its breeding seasons vary latitudinally and are possibly influenced by other factors as well. Few active nests have been found because most are sited in dense vegetation. Both sexes build the nest, which is a loose platform of thin dry sticks, usually place in a tree fork. The clutch size is usually two to four eggs. Both parents are thought to incubate the clutch, because that is typical of other Coccyzus cuckoos. The incubation period is not known but is thought to be similar to the nine to 12 days of others of its genus. The time to fledging is also not known.

=== Vocalization ===
The pearly-breasted cuckoo's primary song is the "Kuoup Call", "a series (usually 5–15, but sometimes 20 or more) of loud and somewhat frog-like kuoup notes." It also makes a "Rattle Call" transcribed as "tuctuctuctuctuctuc towlp, tówlp, tówlp, tówlp" that similar to the yellow-billed cuckoo's call.

== Status ==
The IUCN has assessed the pearly-breasted cuckoo as being of Least Concern. It has an extremely large range, and though its population size is not known it is believed to be stable. No immediate threats have been identified. However, "one can assume that numbers have been affected by local and regional deforestation and habitat degradation in the Neotropics." In parts of northeastern Brazil it is hunted for food.
