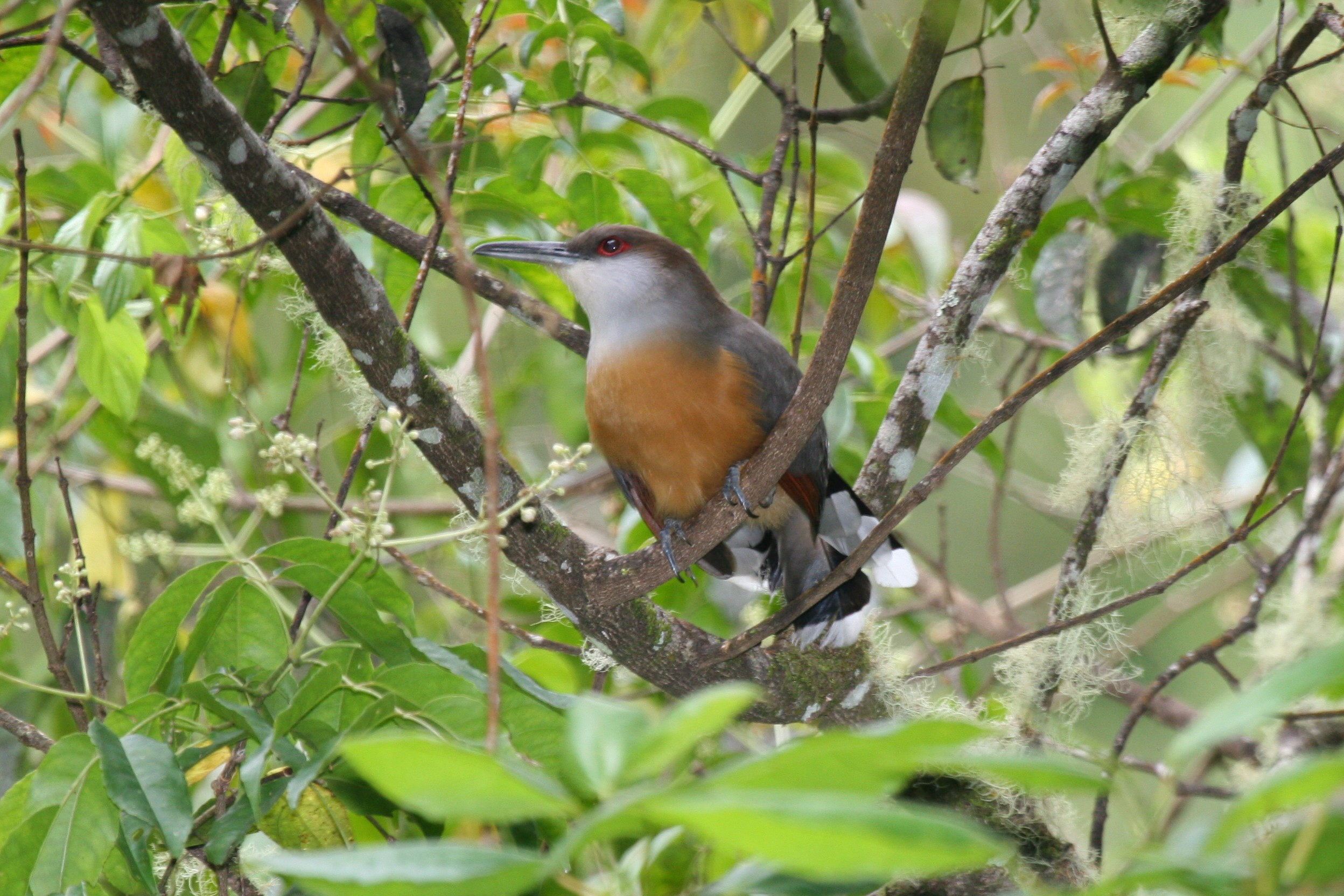

Conservation status
- Least Concern (IUCN 3.1)

Scientific classification
- Kingdom: Animalia
- Phylum: Chordata
- Class: Aves
- Order: Cuculiformes
- Family: Cuculidae
- Genus: Coccyzus
- Species: C. vetula

Binomial name
- Coccyzus vetula (Linnaeus, 1758)

Synonyms
- Cuculus vetula Linnaeus, 1758; Saurothera vetula (Linnaeus, 1758)

= Jamaican lizard cuckoo =

Species of bird

The Jamaican lizard cuckoo (Coccyzus vetula) is a species of bird in the tribe Phaenicophaeini, subfamily Cuculinae of the cuckoo family Cuculidae. It is endemic to Jamaica.

== Taxonomy ==
The Jamaican lizard cuckoo was formally described in 1758 by the Swedish naturalist Carl Linnaeus in the tenth edition of his Systema Naturae under the binomial name Cuculus vetula. Linnaeus cited earlier descriptions by the collector Hans Sloane and the Irish physician Patrick Browne, both of whom had given the English name as "Old man". The specific epithet vetula is Latin meaning "old woman". The Jamaican lizard cuckoo is now one of 13 species placed in the genus Coccyzus that was introduced in 1816 by the French ornithologist Louis Pierre Vieillot. The species is monotypic: no subspecies are recognised.

The Jamaican lizard cuckoo and three other lizard cuckoos were for a time considered a single species. Individually they were previously placed in genus Saurothera that was later merged into the current Coccyzus, and they are considered a superspecies.

== Description ==
The Jamaican lizard cuckoo is 38 to 40 cm (15 to 16 in) long, about half of which is the tail, and weighs 86 to 105 g (3.0 to 3.7 oz). It has a long, straight, rectangular bill with a black maxilla and a paler mandible. The sexes have the same plumage. Adults have a brown forehead, crown to below the eye, and nape. Their upperparts are grayish with rufous primaries. Their throat is whitish and the rest of the underparts are rufous that is lighter on the undertail coverts. Their tail feathers are gray with wide white tips; the central pair have a black band above the tip. Their eye is surrounded by bare red skin. Juveniles have narrower tail feathers than adults and buffy tips on the secondaries.

== Distribution and habitat ==
The Jamaican lizard cuckoo is found throughout the island from sea level to 1,200 m (3,900 ft) of elevation. It primarily inhabits lowland tropical evergreen forest and is also found in tropical deciduous forest, more open woodlands, and semi-arid landscapes of trees and shrubs.

== Behavior ==
=== Movement ===
The Jamaican lizard cuckoo is not migratory.

=== Feeding ===
The Jamaican lizard cuckoo forages mostly from the forest mid-story to the canopy, running along branches and gliding from tree to tree. Its diet is cosmopolitan and includes Anolis lizards, adult and larval insects, mice, nestling birds, and sometimes tree frogs. Young are fed mainly with lizards.

=== Breeding ===
The Jamaican lizard cuckoo's breeding season generally spans from March to August, though courtship has been observed in October. It makes a flat platform nest of twigs lined with leaves, placed well hidden in a tangle of branches or bromeliads. Both adults incubate the eggs and care for nestlings.

=== Vocalization ===
The Jamaican lizard cuckoo's principal vocalization is a "[r]apid, low 'cak-cak-cak-ka-ka-ka-k-k'."

== Status ==
The IUCN has assessed the Jamaican lizard cuckoo as being of Least Concern, though it has a rather small range and an unknown population size that is believed to be decreasing. No immediate threats have been identified. It is widespread on the island but uncommon, and "further research is required to determine various aspects of its breeding."
