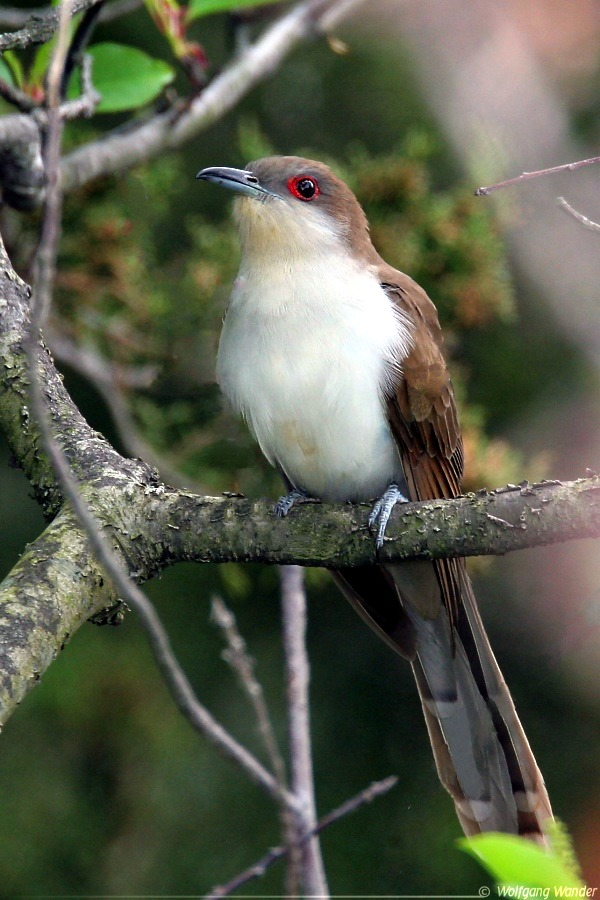
- Black-billed cuckoo (Coccyzus erythropthalmus)

Scientific classification
- Kingdom: Animalia
- Phylum: Chordata
- Class: Aves
- Order: Cuculiformes
- Family: Cuculidae
- Genus: Coccyzus; Vieillot, 1816

Type species
- Cuculus americanus (yellow-billed cuckoo) Linnaeus, 1758

Species
- 13, see text

Synonyms
- Hyetornis; Saurothera

= Coccyzus =

Genus of birds

Coccyzus is a genus of cuckoos which occur in the Americas. The genus name is from Ancient Greek kokkuzo, which means to call like a common cuckoo. The genus includes the lizard cuckoos that were formerly included in the genus Saurothera.

== Taxonomy ==
The genus Coccyzus was introduced in 1816 by the French ornithologist Louis Pierre Vieillot to accommodate a single species, Comte de Buffon's "Coucou de la Caroline", now the yellow-billed cuckoo. This which is therefore the type species. The genus name is from the Ancient Greek kokkuzō meaning "to cry cuckoo".

The results of a molecular phylogenetic study of the cuckoo family by Michael Sorenson and Robert Payne that was published in 2005 lead to a reorganization of some of the genera. Based on this study, the genera Saurothera (the lizard cuckoos) and Hyetornis (chestnut-bellied and bay-breasted cuckoos) were lumped with Coccyzus while the ash-colored cuckoo and dwarf cuckoo, at one time separated in Micrococcyx, were found to be closest relatives of the little cuckoo, formerly in Piaya. These three species were placed in the resurrected genus Coccycua.

== Species ==
The genus contains 13 species:

Image	Common name	Scientific name	Distribution
	Black-billed cuckoo	Coccyzus erythropthalmus	Eastern North America, the Caribbean, Central America, and the Andes
	Yellow-billed cuckoo	Coccyzus americanus	Eastern United States, Central America, and eastern South America
	Pearly-breasted cuckoo	Coccyzus euleri	Argentina, Bolivia, Brazil, Colombia, Ecuador, French Guiana, Guyana, Paraguay, Suriname, Peru, and Venezuela
	Mangrove cuckoo	Coccyzus minor	southern Florida in the United States, the Bahamas, the Caribbean, both coasts of Mexico and Central America, and the Atlantic coast of South America as far south as the mouth of the Amazon River.
	Cocos cuckoo	Coccyzus ferrugineus	Costa Rica
	Dark-billed cuckoo	Coccyzus melacoryphus	Argentina, Bolivia, Brazil, Colombia, Ecuador, French Guiana, Guyana, Paraguay, Peru, Suriname, Trinidad and Tobago, Uruguay and Venezuela
	Grey-capped cuckoo	Coccyzus lansbergi	Aruba, Colombia, Ecuador, Netherlands Antilles, Panama, Peru, and Venezuela.
	Chestnut-bellied cuckoo	Coccyzus pluvialis	Jamaica
	Bay-breasted cuckoo	Coccyzus rufigularis	Dominican Republic
	Great lizard cuckoo	Coccyzus merlini	The Bahamas (on Andros, Eleuthera and New Providence) and Cuba
	Puerto Rican lizard cuckoo	Coccyzus vieilloti	Puerto Rico
	Jamaican lizard cuckoo	Coccyzus vetula	Jamaica
	Hispaniolan lizard cuckoo	Coccyzus longirostris	Hispaniola (both Haiti and the Dominican Republic)

== Description and ecology ==
These birds are of variable size with slender bodies, long tails and strong legs. Many have black and white undertail patterns. They occur in a variety of forests, woodlands or mangroves.

Coccyzus cuckoos, unlike many Old World species, build their own nests in trees and lay two or more eggs. Yellow-billed and black-billed cuckoos occasionally lay eggs in the nests of other birds, but are not obligate brood parasites like the common cuckoo of Eurasia.

Northern species such as yellow-billed and black-billed cuckoos are strong migrants, wintering in Central or South America, and occasionally wander to western Europe as rare vagrants, but the tropical Coccyzus cuckoos are mainly sedentary.

These are vocal species when breeding, with persistent and loud calls. They feed on large insects such as cicadas, wasps and caterpillars (including those with stinging hairs or spines which are distasteful to many birds). Lizard cuckoos are large and powerful species, and mainly take vertebrate prey, especially, as the name implies, lizards.
