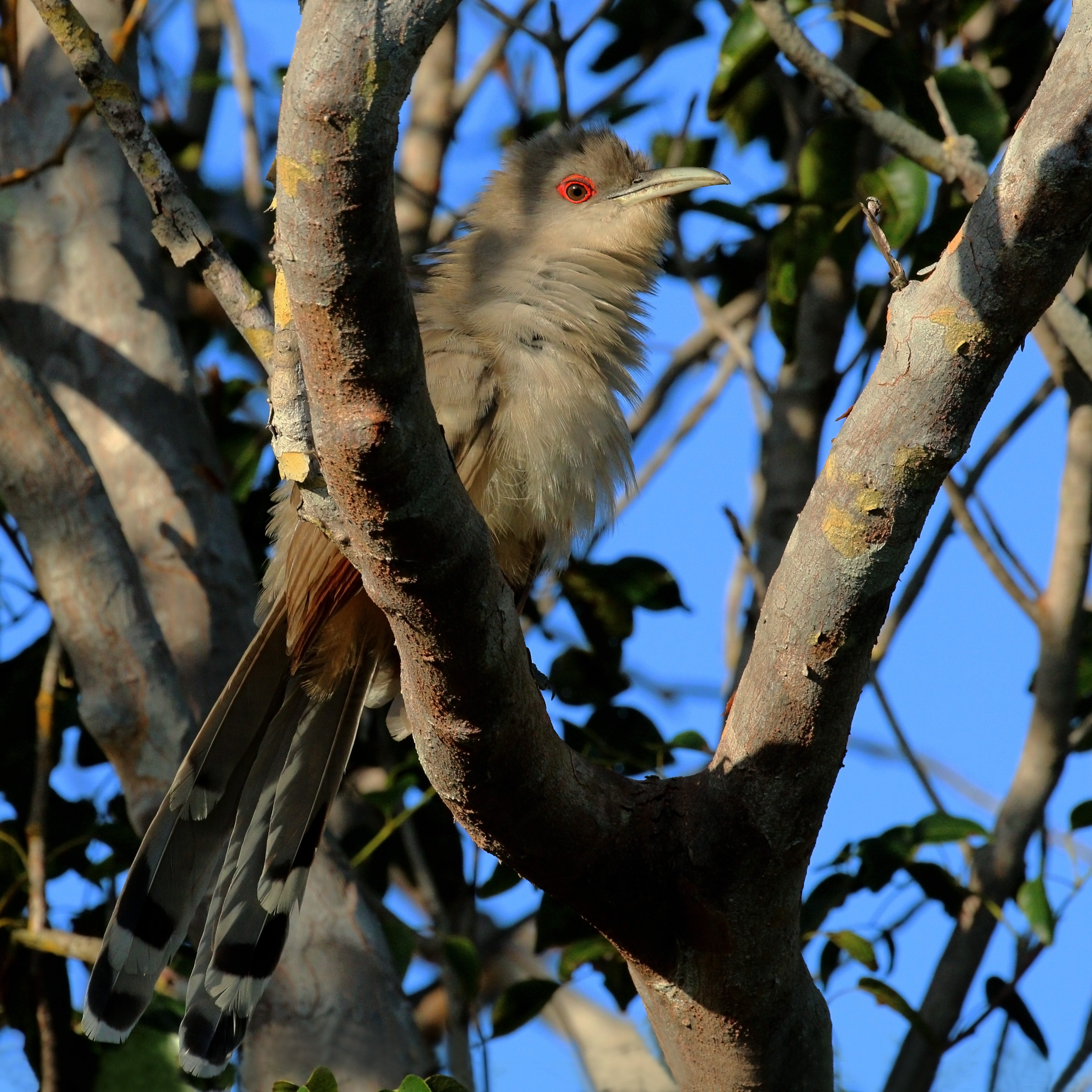
- C. m. santamariae Cayo Coco, Cuba

Conservation status
- Least Concern (IUCN 3.1)(merlini)

- Near Threatened (IUCN 3.1)(bahamanesis)

Scientific classification
- Kingdom: Animalia
- Phylum: Chordata
- Class: Aves
- Order: Cuculiformes
- Family: Cuculidae
- Genus: Coccyzus
- Species: C. merlini

Binomial name
- Coccyzus merlini (D'Orbigny, 1839)

Synonyms
- Saurothera merlini D'Orbigny; Coccyzus bahamensis (in part)

= Great lizard cuckoo =

Species of bird

The great lizard cuckoo (Coccyzus merlini) is a species of bird in the tribe Phaenicophaeini, subfamily Cuculinae of the cuckoo family Cuculidae. It is found in the Bahamas and Cuba.

== Taxonomy and systematics ==
The great lizard cuckoo and three other lizard cuckoos were for a time considered a single species. Individually they were previously placed in genus Saurothera that was later merged into the current Coccyzus, and they are considered a superspecies. The North American Classification Committee of the American Ornithological Society, the International Ornithological Committee, and the Clements taxonomy assign it these four subspecies:

- C. m. bahamensis (Bryant, H., 1864)
- C. m. santamariae (Garrido, 1971)
- C. m. merlini (D'Orbigny, 1839)
- C. m. decolor (Bangs & Zappey, 1905)

During part of the 19th century C. m. bahamensis was treated as a separate species, the Bahama lizard cuckoo, and the other three subspecies were collectively known as the Cuban lizard cuckoo. BirdLife International's Handbook of the Birds of the World has reverted to that two-species treatment.

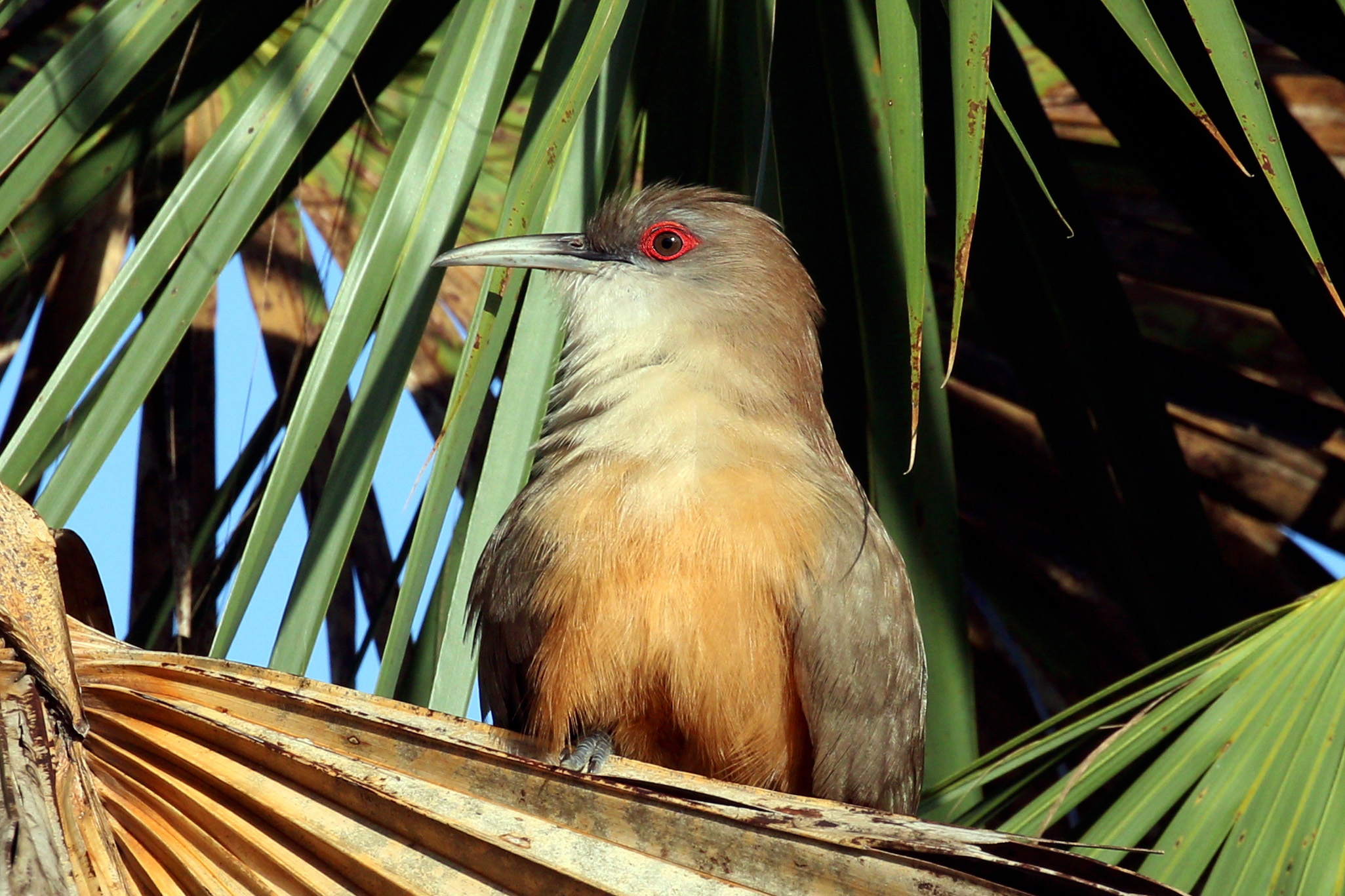
C. m. merlini, Zapata National Park, Cuba

== Description ==
The great lizard cuckoo is the largest species in genus Coccyzus. It is 42 to 54 cm (17 to 21 in) long, about half of which is the tail, and weighs about 100 to 155 g (3.5 to 5.5 oz). Both sexes within each subspecies have the same plumage, but males are larger than females. The species' bill is long and almost straight, with a black or dusky maxilla and a paler mandible. Adults of the nominate subspecies C. m. merlini have an olive-brown crown, nape, and upperparts. Their primaries are rufous, but that color often only shows in flight. They have a whitish throat, pale gray cheeks and breast, and rufous belly and undertail coverts. Their tail's central pair of feathers are gray and the rest are gray with wide white tips and a black bar above the tip. Their eye is surrounded by red to orange bare skin. Juveniles have narrower tail feathers than adults, with faint white ends, and yellow skin around the eye.

Subspecies C. m. santamariae is somewhat smaller and paler than the nominate and has a longer bill but is otherwise very similar. C. m. decolor has more grayish brown upperparts than the nominate and a shorter bill. Adults of C. m. bahamensis have some significant differences from the nominate. They are smaller, have grayer upperparts, a buff wash on the belly, and a black band near the end of all of the tail feathers. Juveniles are similar to adults but with a slightly paler throat and breast and no black bars on the tail.

== Distribution and habitat ==
The subspecies of great lizard cuckoo are distributed thus:

- C. m. bahamensis, Andros, New Providence, Eleuthera, and Harbour islands in the Bahamas
- C. m. santamariae, many small islands off the north-central coast of Cuba's main island
- C. m. merlini, the main island of Cuba and Cayo Conuco and Cayo Saetía off its north coast
- C. m. decolor, Isla de la Juventud (Isle of Pines)

The three Cuban subspecies of great lizard cuckoo inhabit a wide variety of landscapes including mature semi-deciduous and evergreen forest, secondary forest, savanna, scrublands, and the undergrowth of pine forest. In elevation they range from sea level to at least 1,250 m (4,100 ft). C. m. bahamensis is similarly non-selective, inhabiting semi-deciduous, deciduous, and pine forest (especially forests with many vines), scrublands, and coffee plantations.

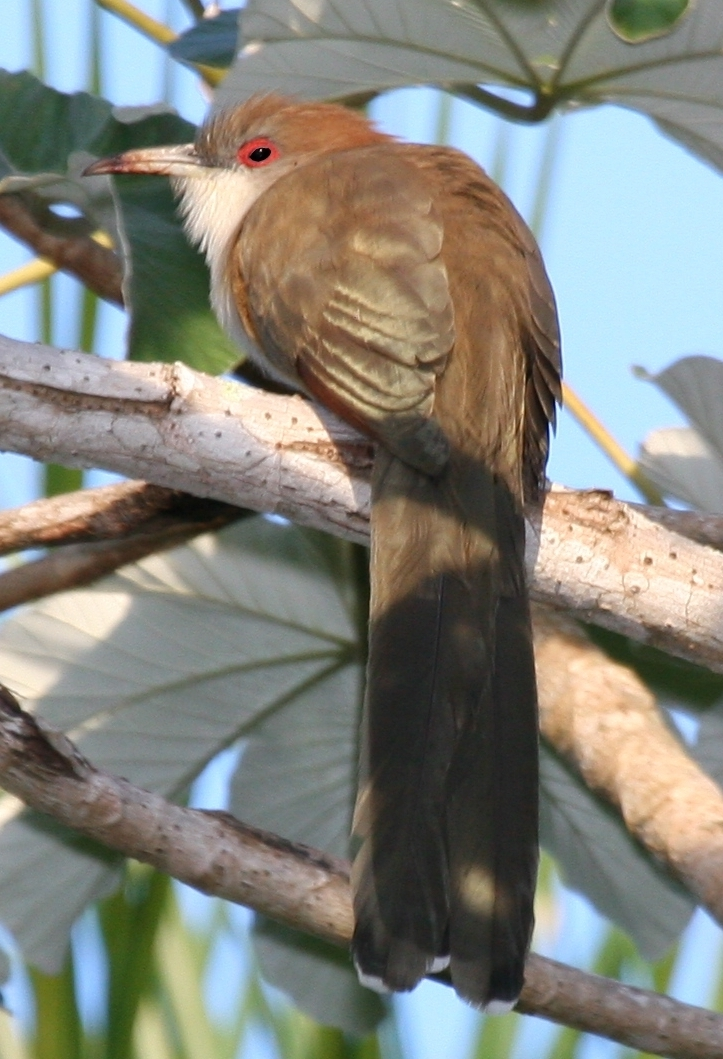
Back view

== Behavior ==
=== Movement ===
The great lizard cuckoo is assumed to be sedentary.

=== Feeding ===
The great lizard cuckoo is an opportunistic feeder; it forages mostly from the forest mid-story to the canopy, running along branches and gliding from tree to tree, but also spends significant time foraging on the ground, where it can run quickly if needed. No detailed studies of its diet have been made but, like many birds, its observed diet often fluctuates between insectivorous, omnivorous, and carnivorous; it is known to feed on lizards, adult (and larval) insects of many families, nestling birds, frogs, snakes, and sometimes small mammals and seeds or fruits.

=== Breeding ===
The great lizard cuckoo's breeding phenology is very poorly known, especially in the Bahamas. Its breeding season there appears to include April and May, and that on mainland Cuba might be as long as April to October. The nest is a shallow saucer made of twigs and lined with leaves; it is typically placed in dense foliage of a tree or bush at a low to medium height above the ground. The clutch size is two or three eggs. The incubation period and time to fledging are not known.

=== Vocalization ===
The great lizard cuckoo's principal vocalization is the "Long Call", described as "a throaty ka-ka-ka-ka-ka-ka-kau-kau-ko-ko...with the second part gradually increasing in volume and increasing slightly in the speed of delivery before finally slowing again". It calls at any time of day, but sporadically. Another vocalization, the "Groan" is "a single emphatic Chuk note followed by a low-pitched (ca. 1 kHz) guttural and grating sound". It also makes sounds called the "Chuckle" and the "Screech". There does not appear to be significant variation among the subspecies.

== Status ==
The IUCN follows HBW taxonomy, and so has assessed the "Cuban" and "Bahama" lizard cuckoos separately. It classifies the Cuban (with its three subspecies) as being of Least Concern. It has a large range, and though its population size is not known it is believed to be stable. No immediate threats have been identified. However, the IUCN treats the Bahama population as Near Threatened. It has a very restricted range and an estimated population of 2500 to 10,000 mature individuals; the population trend is unknown. Identified potential threats include road construction, agricultural development, fires, feral cats and rats, and sea level rise due to climate change.
