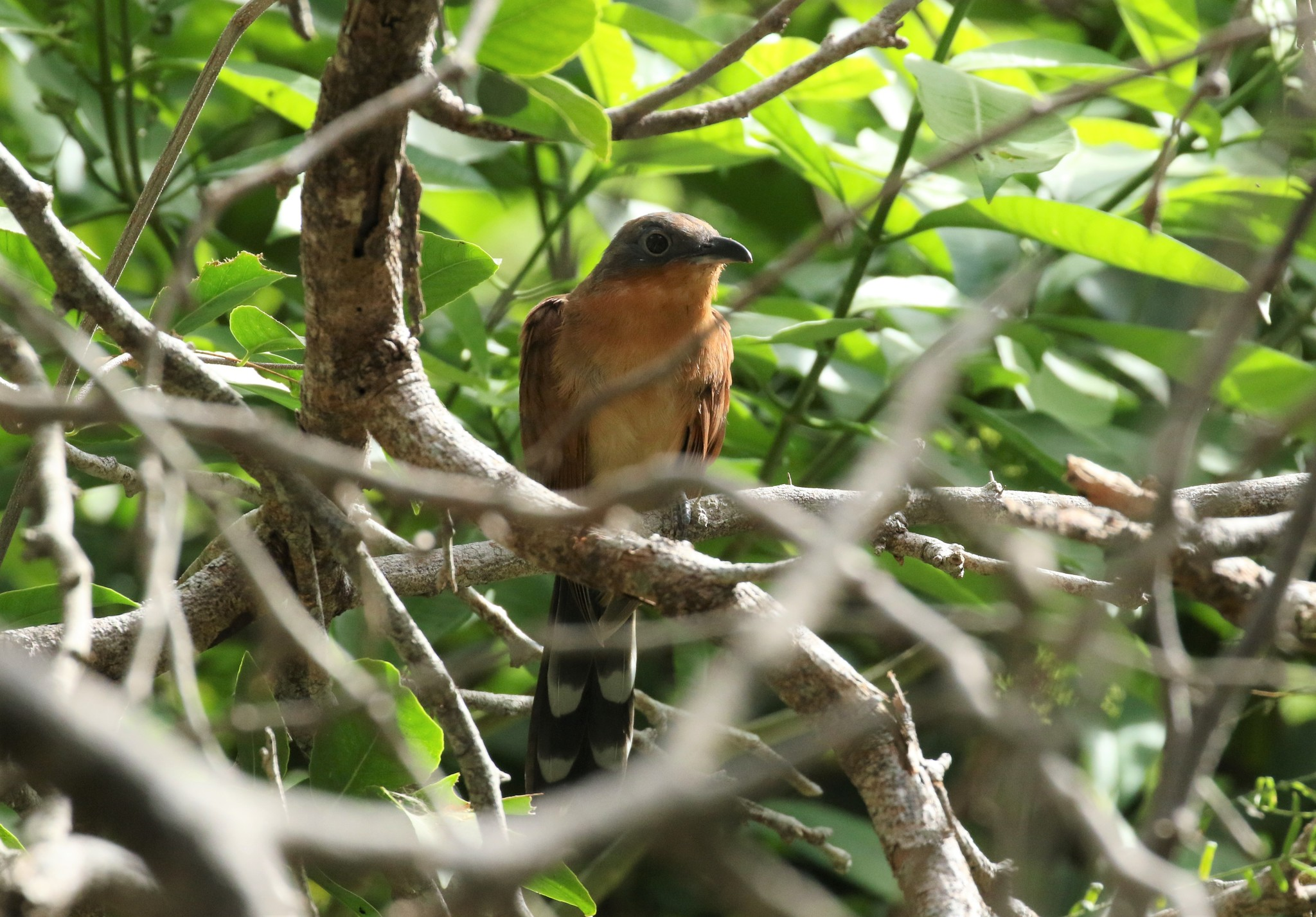

Conservation status
- Least Concern (IUCN 3.1)

Scientific classification
- Kingdom: Animalia
- Phylum: Chordata
- Class: Aves
- Order: Cuculiformes
- Family: Cuculidae
- Genus: Coccyzus
- Species: C. lansbergi

Binomial name
- Coccyzus lansbergi Bonaparte, 1850

= Grey-capped cuckoo =

Species of bird

The grey-capped cuckoo (Coccyzus lansbergi) is a species of bird in the tribe Phaenicophaeini, subfamily Cuculinae of the cuckoo family Cuculidae. It is found in Colombia, Ecuador, Peru, and Venezuela, as a vagrant on Bonaire and in the Galápagos Islands, and possibly in Panama.

== Taxonomy and systematics ==
The grey-capped cuckoo is more closely related to the Caribbean species of genus Coccyzus than it is to the others found in South America. The species is monotypic.

== Description ==
The grey-capped cuckoo is 25 to 28 cm (9.8 to 11 in) long, about half of which is the tail. Males weigh 46 to 56 g (1.6 to 2.0 oz). The species' bill is stout, somewhat decurved, and black with sometimes a gray or yellow spot at the base of the mandible. Males and females have the same plumage. Adults have a slate-gray cap to below the eye. Their upperparts and wings are rufous brown. The upper surface of their tail is black; the underside of the central pair of feathers is black and the rest black with white tips. Their eye is surrounded by a narrow ring of bare skin that is yellow, white, or yellowish gray. Their underparts are dark rufous buff. Juveniles are similar to adults but have a brown crown and less white on the tail.

== Distribution and habitat ==
The grey-capped cuckoo has two separate populations. One is in northern Colombia and northwestern Venezuela and the other in western Ecuador and extreme northern Peru. The species has been documented as a vagrant on Bonaire (an island off the Venezuelan coast) and on the Galapagos Islands. Two reports from Panama have apparently not been accepted by the North American Classification Committee of the American Ornithological Society.

The grey-capped cuckoo inhabits a variety of landscapes including tropical moist to dry semi-deciduous forest, arid forest, gallery forest, and shrubby savanna. In elevation it mostly ranges from sea level to 800 m (2,600 ft) in Peru, to 1,800 m (5,900 ft) in Ecuador, to 600 m (2,000 ft) in Colombia, and to 1,400 m (4,600 ft) in Venezuela. There are a few records from higher elevations.

== Behavior ==
=== Movement ===
The grey-capped cuckoo is partially or wholly migratory, but the timing and locations involved are poorly known. Migration might be within each separate area rather than between them.

=== Feeding ===
The grey-capped cuckoo feeds on insects; caterpillars and some wasps appear to form the bulk of its diet.

=== Breeding ===
The grey-capped cuckoo's breeding season in Ecuador may be as long as from January to June, but details there and in the rest of its range are lacking. Its nest is a platform of twigs lined with lichens placed on a horizontal branch between about 0.4 and 5 metres (1 and 20 ft) above the ground and concealed by foliage. The clutch size is two to five eggs. Both parents incubate the eggs over nine to 12 days and fledging occurs eight to 13 days after hatch. Incubation begins with the first egg laid so hatching is asynchronous and the young differ in size.

=== Vocalization ===
The grey-capped cuckoo's song is a "[f]ast series of 6–8 hollow and falling 'cu' notes, often with a slight pause before the last note, e.g., 'cucucucucucucu-cu'." It may be repeated several times during each song bout.

== Status ==
The IUCN has assessed the grey-capped cuckoo as being of Least Concern, though its population size is not known and is believed to be decreasing. No specific threats have been identified. Its distribution is not well known; it is thought to be fairly common but still local in western Ecuador and rare elsewhere. "Further research [is] required, primarily to define [the] limits of range."
