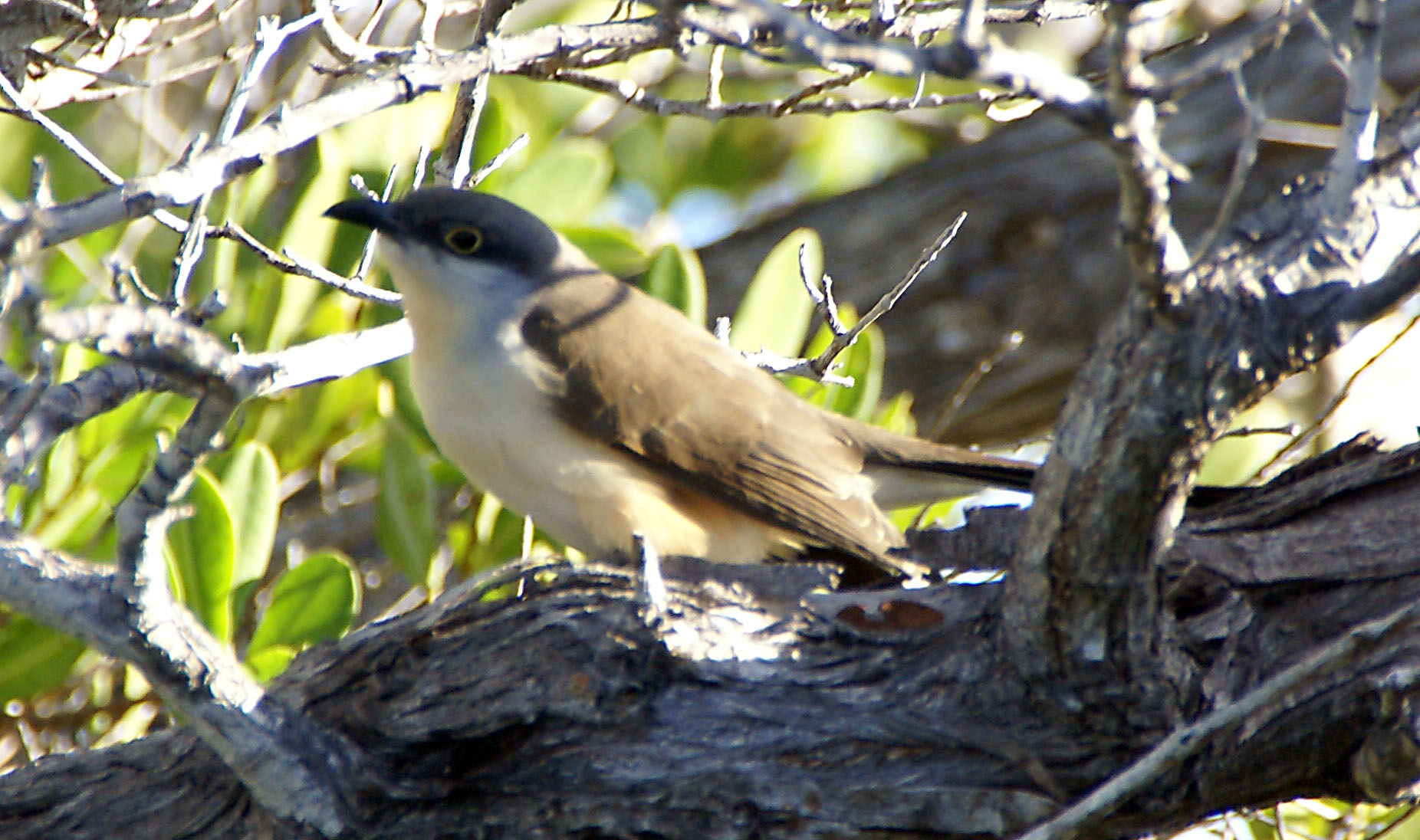

Conservation status
- Least Concern (IUCN 3.1)

Scientific classification
- Kingdom: Animalia
- Phylum: Chordata
- Class: Aves
- Order: Cuculiformes
- Family: Cuculidae
- Genus: Coccyzus
- Species: C. melacoryphus

Binomial name
- Coccyzus melacoryphus Vieillot, 1817

= Dark-billed cuckoo =

Species of bird

The dark-billed cuckoo (Coccyzus melacoryphus) is a species of bird in the tribe Phaenicophaeini, subfamily Cuculinae of the cuckoo family Cuculidae. It is regularly found in every mainland South American country except Chile plus the Galápagos Islands. It has also occurred as a vagrant in Chile and several other countries and islands.

== Taxonomy and systematics ==
The dark-billed cuckoo is monotypic.

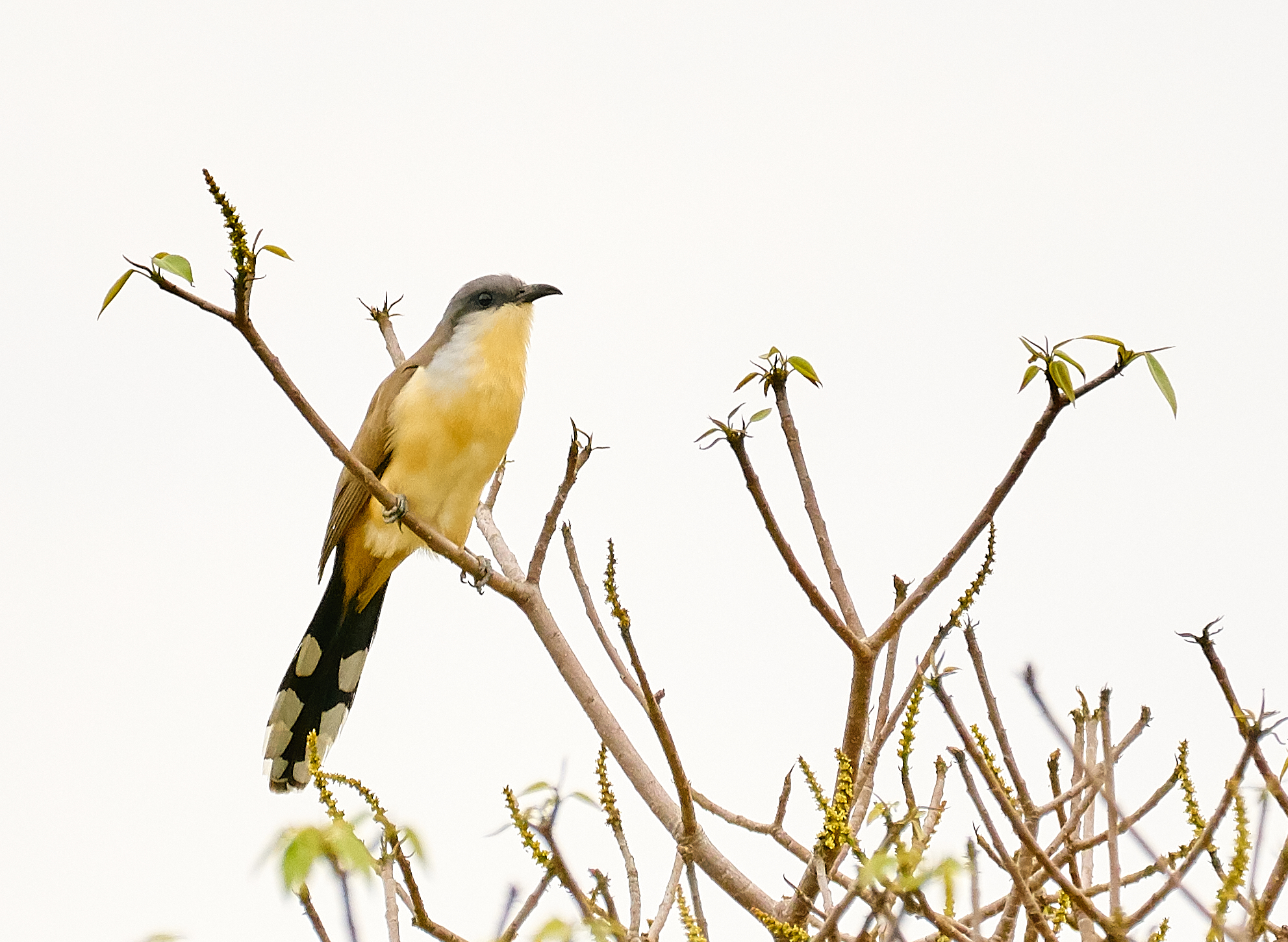
In the Galápagos Islands

== Description ==
The dark-billed cuckoo is 25 to 28 cm (9.8 to 11.0 in) long, about half of which is the tail. Males weigh about 42 to 54 g (1.5 to 1.9 oz) and females about 50 to 66 g (1.8 to 2.3 oz). Males and females have the same plumage. They have a gray crown and nape and grayish brown upperparts. Their wings are a darker grayish brown with no rufous. The upper surface of their tail is brown; the underside of the central pair of feathers is brown with black tips, the next pair blackish with narrow white tips, and the rest black with wide white tips. Their face is gray with a wide black "mask" past the eye, which is surrounded by a narrow ring of citron yellow, olive yellow, or gray bare skin. Their underparts are pale buff with the breast somewhat darker than the rest; the sides of the breast and flanks are gray. Juveniles are similar to adults but duller, with a brown crown and nape, gray tips on the tail feathers, and sometimes rufous in the wings.

== Distribution and habitat ==
The dark-billed cuckoo is found regularly throughout much of South America except in Chile, where it has occurred as a vagrant. It is also resident on the Galápagos Islands. In addition to Chile, it has occurred as a vagrant in Clipperton Island, Panama, Trinidad, the Falkland Islands, Grenada, Florida, and Texas. It inhabits a wide variety of landscapes including the interior and edges of tropical deciduous, gallery, and mature secondary forest plus mangroves. It is generally a bird of the lowlands below 950 m (3,100 ft) but has been documented as high as 3,600 m (11,800 ft).

== Behavior ==
=== Movement ===
The dark-billed cuckoo is a year-round resident in the Galápagos Islands and west of the Andes in Colombia, Ecuador, and maybe Peru. Those in southern Brazil, Uruguay, and Argentina breed there and migrate north for the austral winter (March to October). Those breeding on the Venezuelan Llanos between May and October move south after nesting. The species is present in most of the Amazon basin only during the austral winter.

=== Feeding ===
The dark-billed cuckoo's diet is almost entirely insects, both adult and larval.

=== Breeding ===
The dark-billed cuckoo's nest is a flat platform made of sticks and placed in a tree or bush. In most of its range it lays two or three eggs but in Argentina the clutch is more commonly three to four and occasionally five. The eggs are greenish blue. Incubation begins with the first egg laid so hatching is asynchronous and the young differ in size.

=== Vocalization ===
The dark-billed cuckoo's song is variously described as "six to eight resonant, buzzy kazoo-like notes" and "a ventriloquial ga-ga-ga-go-go." Another vocalization is "a descending series of guttural notes" that may also be a song. It makes "a dry-sounding buzz...dddddrr" call.

== Status ==
The IUCN has assessed the dark-billed cuckoo as being of Least Concern. It has an extremely large range, and though its population size is not known it is believed to be stable. No immediate threats have been identified. It is considered fairly common throughout its range.
