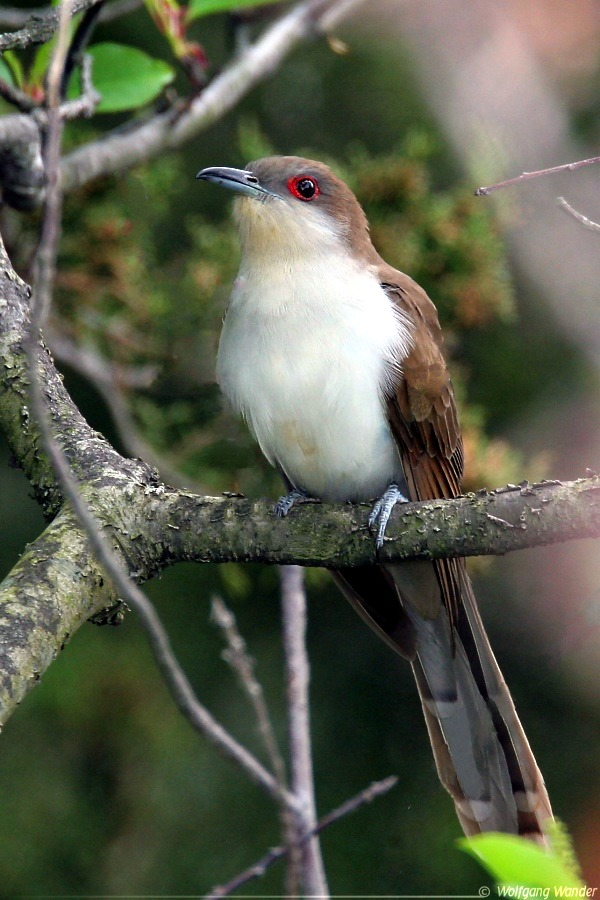

Conservation status
- Least Concern (IUCN 3.1)

Scientific classification
- Kingdom: Animalia
- Phylum: Chordata
- Class: Aves
- Order: Cuculiformes
- Family: Cuculidae
- Genus: Coccyzus
- Species: C. erythropthalmus

Binomial name
- Coccyzus erythropthalmus (Wilson, 1811)
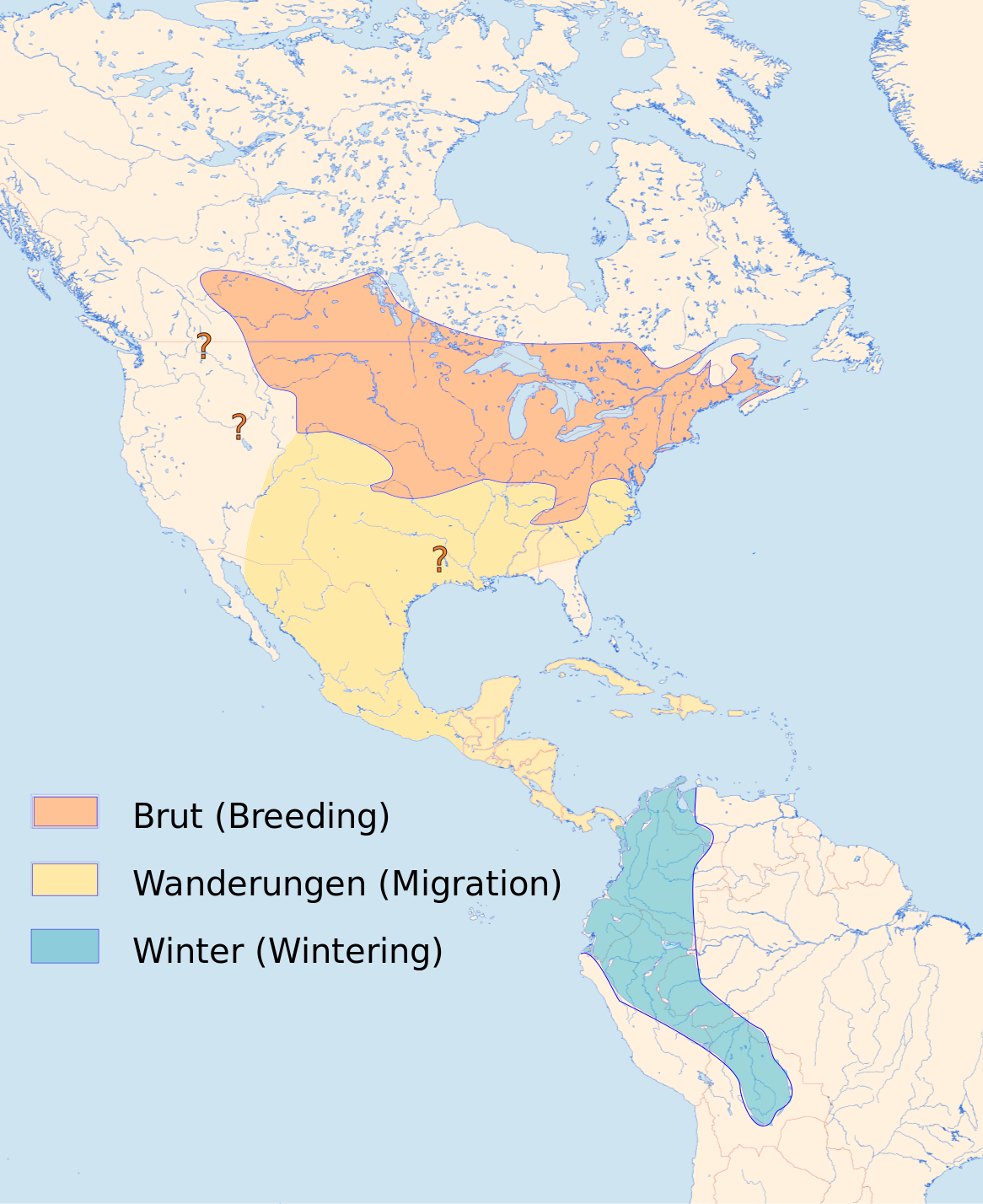

= Black-billed cuckoo =

Species of cuckoo

The black-billed cuckoo (Coccyzus erythropthalmus) is a New World species in the Cuculidae (cuckoo) family. The scientific name is from Ancient Greek. The genus name, kokkuzo, means to call like a common cuckoo, and erythropthalmus is from eruthros, "red" and ophthalmos, "eye".

It is very similar to, and overlaps in range with, the closely related yellow-billed cuckoo. A distinguishing characteristic of the family Cuculidae is laying eggs in the nests of other birds. Although many cuckoos are obligate brood parasites, C. erythropthalmus often incubate their own chicks.

== Description ==
Standard Measurements
Total Body Length	280–320 mm (11–12.6 in)
Mass	45–55 g (1.6–1.9 oz)
Wingspan	440 mm (17.5 in)
Wing	132.9–140.9 mm (5.23–5.55 in)
Tail	147.4–159.8 mm (5.80–6.29 in)
Culmen	20.2–23.9 mm (0.80–0.94 in)
Tarsus	21.1–24.1 mm (0.83–0.95 in)

Adults have a long, graduated brown tail and a black, slightly downcurved bill. The head and upper parts are brown and the underparts are white. The feet are zygodactylous. Juveniles are drabber and may contain some rufous coloration on the wing. The adults have a narrow, red orbital ring while the juveniles' is yellow. Black-billed cuckoo chicks have white, sparsely distributed, sheath-like down that contrasts heavily with their black skin. They also have complex, creamy-colored structures on their mouth and tongue, which may appear like warts or some type of parasitic infection however they are normal for the species.

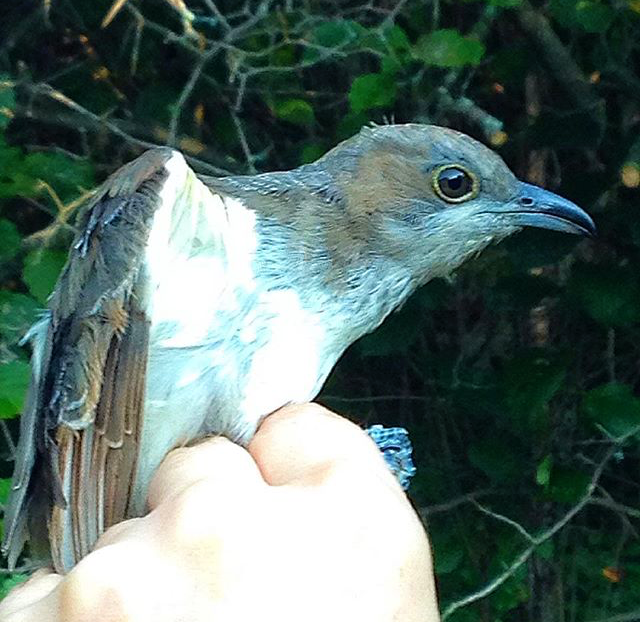
This juvenile black-billed cuckoo was banded at McGill Bird Observatory (MBO) in June 2015.

== Habitat ==
C. erythropthalmus may be found in a variety of habitats. They are most commonly found around the edges of mature deciduous or mixed forests and much less frequently in coniferous forests. They can also be found in much younger-growth forests with a lot of shrubs and thickets. Wetlands with a lot of alder and willow are another prime location to see them. Lastly, they can also inhabit more open areas such as abandoned farmland, golf courses, and residential parks. Whatever the habitat may be, they are usually quite well hidden and tend to stick to the edges of these habitats. The chosen habitat must also have a water source nearby such as a lake, river, marsh, or pond. On their wintering grounds in South America, they can inhabit tropical rainforests, deciduous or semi open woodlands as well as scrub forests.

== Range ==
When breeding, the species is distributed in wooded areas across much of the United States, east of the Rockies. Their range just barely extends into North Carolina, Arkansas, Oklahoma, and Tennessee. They are not present to the south of those states when breeding. They can also be found in the southern regions of Alberta, Saskatchewan, Manitoba, Ontario, and Quebec. Furthermore, they are also present in the maritime provinces of Prince Edward Island, eastern New Brunswick, and western Nova Scotia. When migrating in spring and fall, they can also be seen in southern United States as well as all of Central America. They migrate to northwestern South America in the fall, where they will spend the winter. Although they are mainly an eastern North American species, there have been confirmed reports of sighting in British Columbia, Washington, and California. The species is also a rare vagrant to western Europe and Greenland.

== Behavior ==
=== Feeding ===
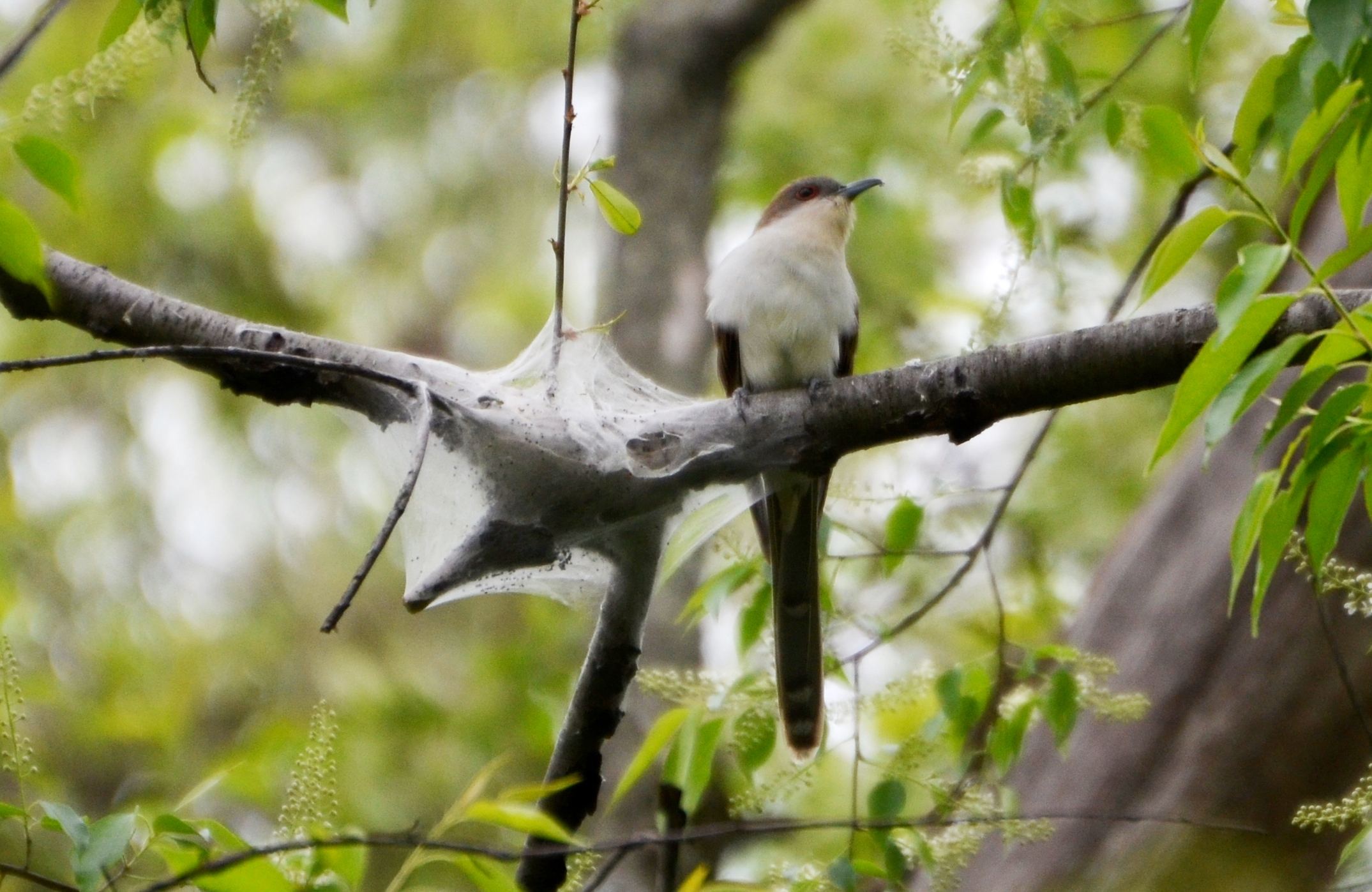
Black-billed cuckoo preying on tent caterpillar nest

These birds forage in shrubs or trees. They mainly eat insects, especially tent caterpillars, but also some snails, eggs of other birds, and berries. It is known to beat caterpillars against a branch before consuming them to remove some of the indigestible hairs. The remaining hairs accumulate in the stomach until the bird sheds the stomach lining and disgorges a pellet in a manner similar to owls.

Invasive spongy moths may also serve as an important food source for black-billed cuckoos. Most birds cannot consume spongy moth caterpillars because of their hair-like setae however, cuckoos can consume them because of their ability to shed their abdominal lining. During outbreak years of these insects, the abundance of black-billed cuckoos increased on Breeding Bird Survey (BBS) routes. This increase is not due to a higher reproductive rate because then the black-billed cuckoo populations would only increase the next year. The abundance is higher because the cuckoos flock towards the outbreak areas. This is supported by the fact that cuckoo abundance is actually lower than average in the areas surrounding the outbreaks, suggesting a large influx of the birds towards the outbreaks. They are able to find these areas due to post-migratory nomadic behavior. Once reaching their breeding ground, they search vast expanses of forest for the most suitable breeding area, in this case, where there is an abundance of food. Similar patterns have also been observed during outbreaks of tent caterpillars, fall webworms, and cicadas.

=== Vocalization ===
When they are a couple of days old, the chicks can make a buzzing sound that resembles an insect and a few days later, they can make a low barking call when disturbed. The call of this species is 2–5 sets of "coo" notes that are high-pitched, rapid, and repetitive. There is a slight pause between each set. The phonetics are often written "coo-coo-coo-coo, coo-coo-coo-coo, coo-coo-coo-coo, ...". Adults usually call during the day when breeding, however they begin calling at night, in the middle of summer.

=== Reproduction ===
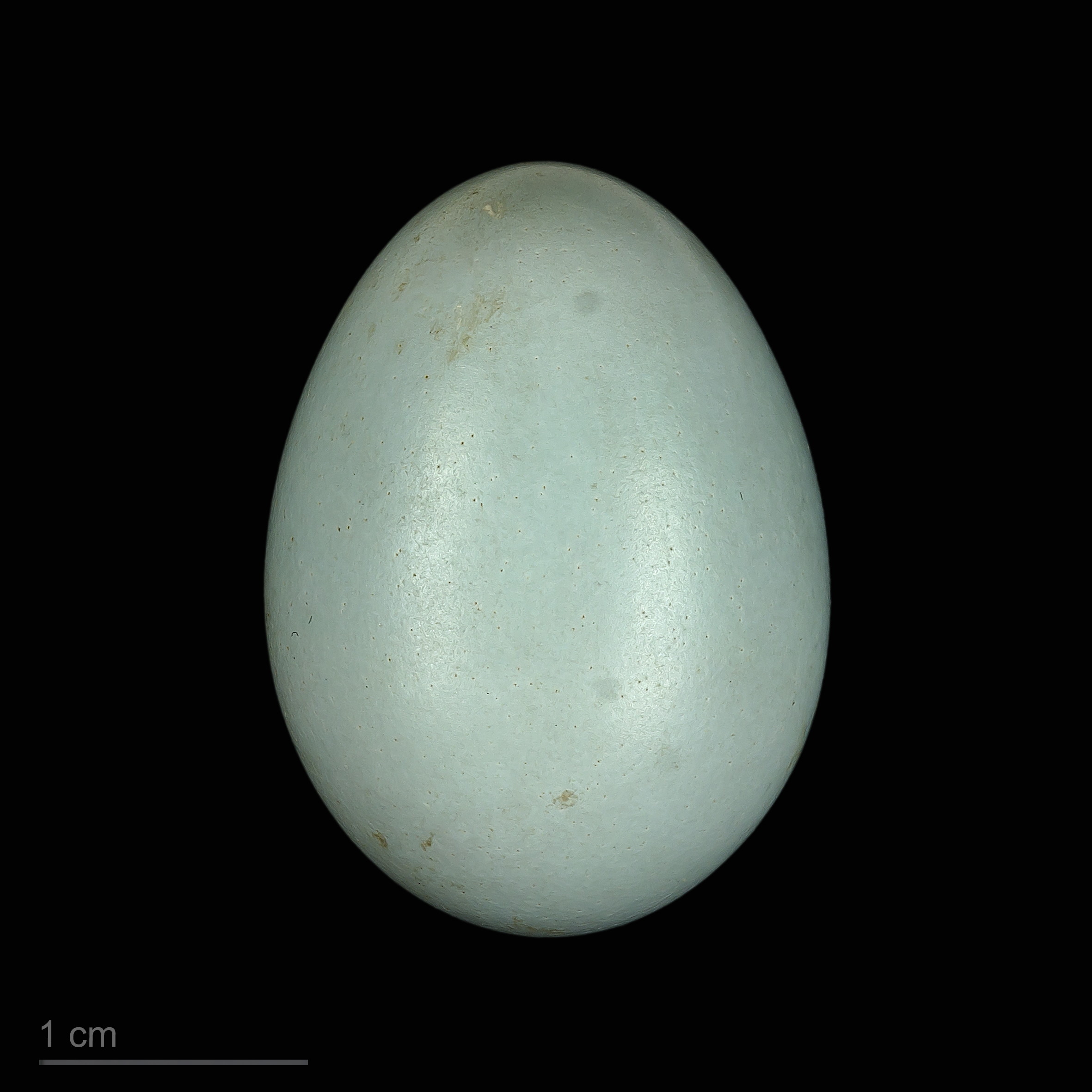
Coccyzus erythropthalmus - MHNT

Prior to copulation, the male lands on a branch near the female with an insect in its beak. The female will then flick her tail up and down intermittently for about 15 minutes while the male sits there motionless. The male then mounts the female, with the insect still in its mouth, and the two copulate. The male then either eats the food item or gives it to the female for her to eat.

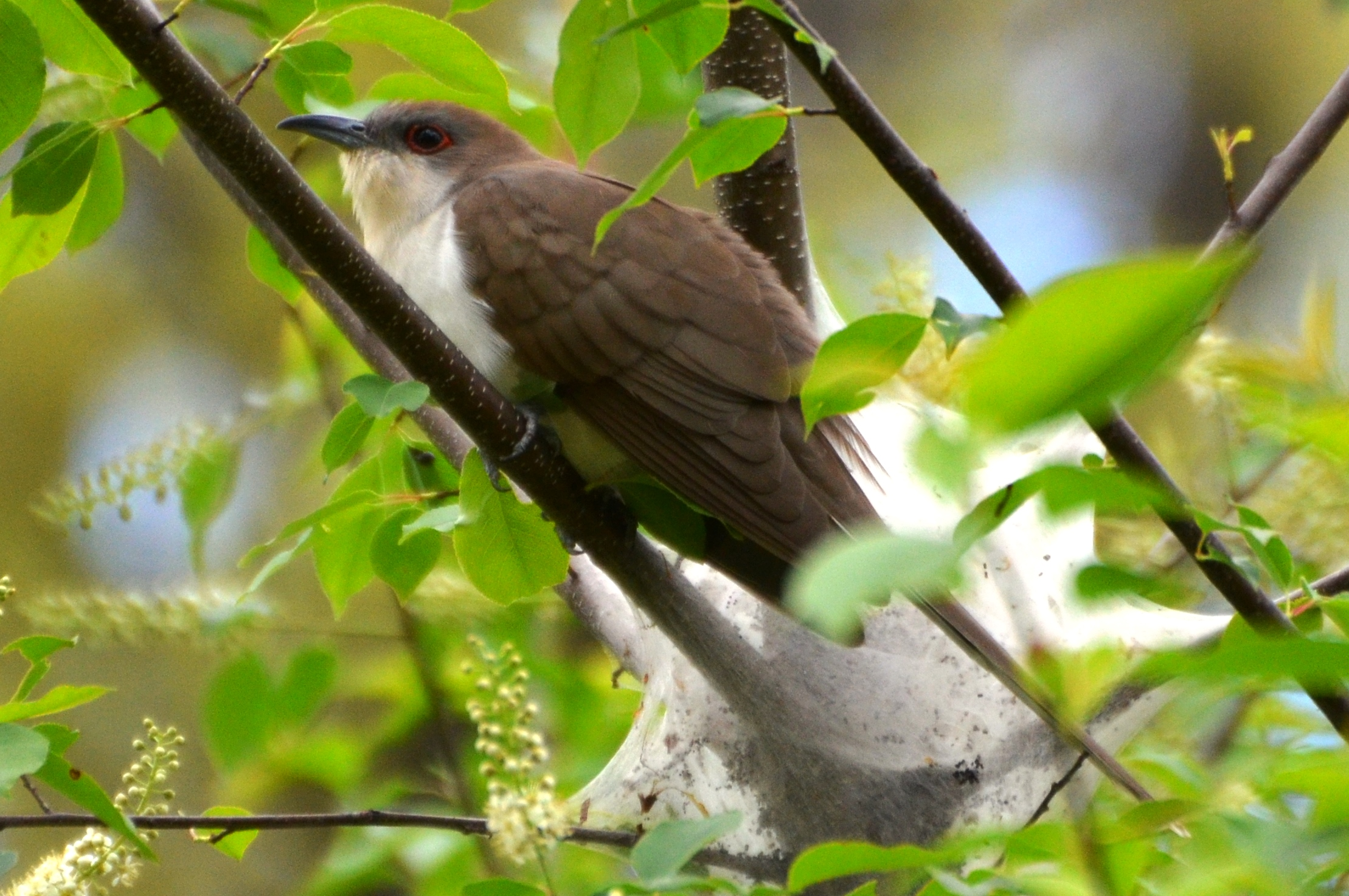
Adult black-billed cuckoo hiding in some branches.

Females usually lay 2–3 blue-green eggs, sometimes 4 or 5, which may take on a marbled appearance after a couple of days of incubation. Adults incubate the eggs for 10–13 days. The young black-billed cuckoos, as well as other cuckoos in the genus Coccyzus, leave the nest 7–9 days after hatching, which is quite young when compared to other birds. The young are not able to fly right away, however they can still move quite large distances by jumping between tree branches. During this period, they are more vulnerable to predators because they cannot fly away as the adults could. Due to this vulnerability, the juveniles can slowly assume an erect posture to conceal themselves. They stretch their neck out and point their bill upwards, while keeping their eyes open and remaining motionless. If the threat starts to back off, the cuckoo will relax its pose.

Outbreaks of tent caterpillars can have a positive effect on black-billed cuckoo populations. During these outbreaks, the adults begin laying eggs earlier in the season. They can also produce larger clutches and may even increase their parasitic activities.

Adult black-billed cuckoo

=== Brood parasitism ===
Black-billed cuckoos generally build their own nests, weaving loose structures of twigs, dried leaves, and pine needles about 2 metres (6.6 ft) above the ground. However, in years with an abundance of food sources (such as outbreaks of periodical cicadas), the species may engage in brood parasitism. They can lay eggs in the nests of other black-billed cuckoos, called conspecific parasitism, or in the nests of other birds, known as interspecific parasitism. The females will usually parasitize nests in the afternoon because the nests are often unguarded at this time. This cuckoo species is thought to have a laying interval of about a day so if two eggs show up in a nest on the same day, you can rightfully assume that one is a parasitic egg.

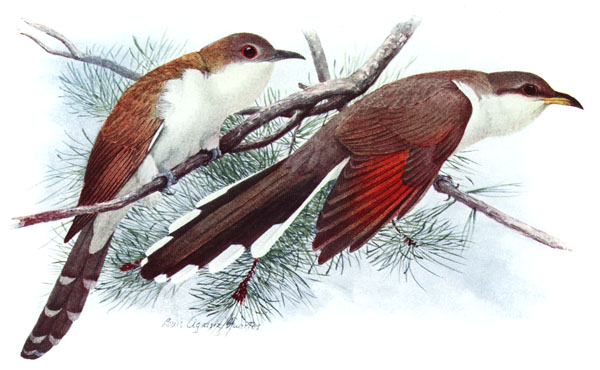
Comparison of black-billed cuckoo and yellow-billed cuckoo

== Taxonomy ==
The black-billed cuckoo was originally placed in the genus Cuculus. This genus comprises Old World cuckoos that are all obligate brood parasites. Upon further genetic testing, it was placed into the genus Coccyzus that comprises nine species of New World cuckoos. The black-billed and yellow-billed cuckoos are the only two that migrate into North America while the other seven are permanent residents of either Central or South America. Even though these two cuckoos overlap in range, they are not sister taxa. This suggests that the two species invaded North America separately. Although the family Cuculidae is monophyletic, the genus Coccyzus was found to be polyphyletic.

== Conservation ==
Although the black-billed cuckoo is classified as Least Concern (LN) on the IUCN red list, its population is still on the decline. It faces many of the same challenges as many other North American songbirds. Pesticides are having a large effect on them because the chemicals are depleting their food resources. Other threats include the loss of habitat, especially in their wintering tropical habitats, as well as urbanization. As with other migratory birds, they frequently encounter large buildings on their migratory routes which they may collide with, resulting in death.
