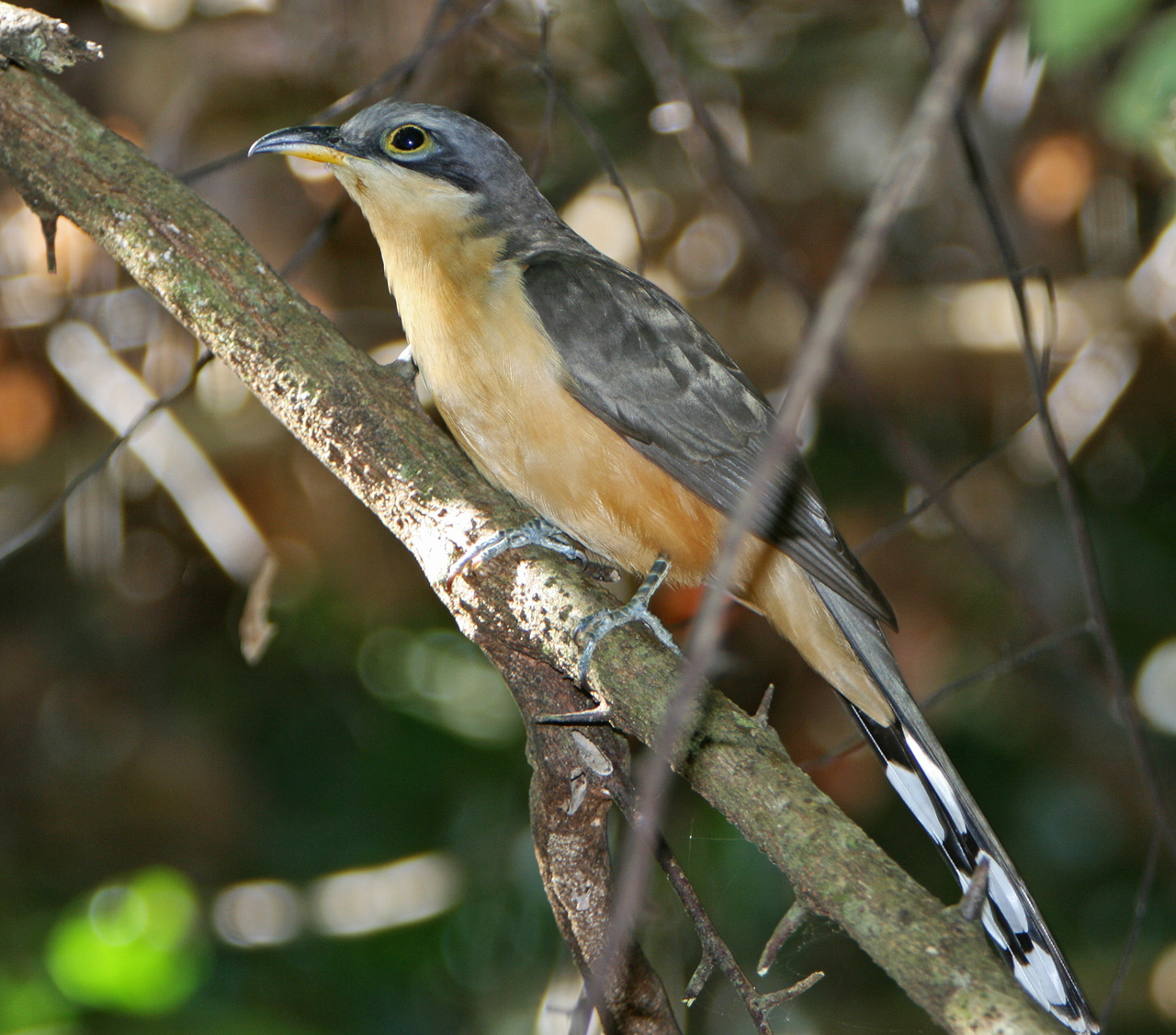

Conservation status
- Least Concern (IUCN 3.1)

Scientific classification
- Kingdom: Animalia
- Phylum: Chordata
- Class: Aves
- Order: Cuculiformes
- Family: Cuculidae
- Genus: Coccyzus
- Species: C. minor

Binomial name
- Coccyzus minor (Gmelin, JF, 1788)

Synonyms
- Coccyzus maynardi

= Mangrove cuckoo =

Species of bird

The mangrove cuckoo (Coccyzus minor) is a species of cuckoo that is native to the Neotropics.

== Taxonomy ==
The mangrove cuckoo was formally described in 1788 by the German naturalist Johann Friedrich Gmelin in his revised and expanded edition of Carl Linnaeus's Systema Naturae. He placed it with all the other cuckoos in the genus Cuculus and coined the binomial name Cuculus minor. Gmelin based his description on "Le petit vieillard" or "Coucou des palétuviers" from Cayenne that had been described and illustrated in 1779 by the French polymath Georges-Louis Leclerc, Comte de Buffon. The mangrove cuckoo is now placed with 12 other species in the genus Coccyzus that was introduced in 1816 by the French ornithologist Louis Pierre Vieillot. The genus name is from the Ancient Greek kokkuzō meaning "to cry cuckoo". The species is monotypic: no subspecies are recognised.

== Description ==
Adults have a long tail, brown above and black-and-white below, and a black curved bill with yellow on the lower mandible. The head and upper parts are brown. There is a yellow ring around the eye. This bird is best distinguished by its black facial mask and buffy underparts. Although the scientific name is minor (meaning "small"), this species is on average the largest of North America's three Coccyzus cuckoos. Adults measure 28–34 cm (11–13 in) in length, weigh 64–102 g (2.3–3.6 oz) and span 38–43 cm (15–17 in) across the wings. The most common call is a guttural "gawk gawk gawk gawk gauk gauk". It will also call a single "whit".

== Distribution and habitat ==
The mangrove cuckoo is a resident of southern Florida in the United States, the Caribbean, both coasts of Mexico and Central America, and the Atlantic coast of South America as far south as the mouth of the Amazon River. It is found primarily in mangrove swamps and hammocks. The mangrove cuckoo is generally fairly common in its specialized range. This bird could be threatened by human development of mangrove habitat.

== Behaviour and ecology ==
=== Breeding ===
It nests 2–3 m (6 ft 7 in – 9 ft 10 in) above water in a mangrove tree or above ground in a fork of a tree. The clutch is usually two eggs. These are white and measure 31 mm × 23 mm (1.22 in × 0.91 in). Both parents bring food to the chicks.

=== Food and feeding ===
It prefers caterpillars and grasshoppers, but will also take other insects, insect larvae, spiders, snails, small lizards, bird eggs, nestlings of small birds, and fruit.
