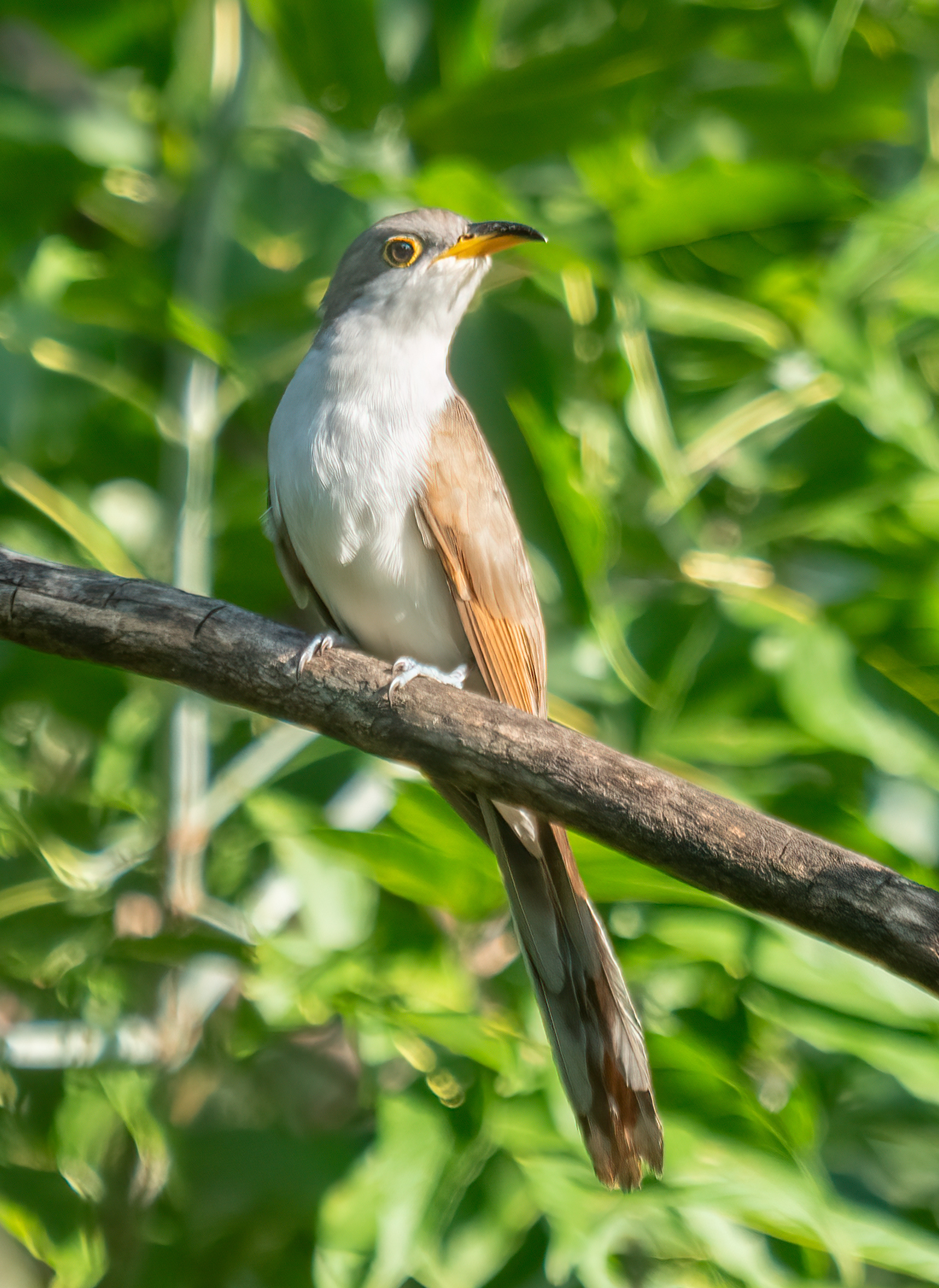

Conservation status
- Least Concern (IUCN 3.1)

Scientific classification
- Kingdom: Animalia
- Phylum: Chordata
- Class: Aves
- Order: Cuculiformes
- Family: Cuculidae
- Genus: Coccyzus
- Species: C. americanus

Binomial name
- Coccyzus americanus (Linnaeus, 1758)
- Breeding range Migration range Non-breeding range

Synonyms
- Cuculus americanus Linnaeus, 1758

= Yellow-billed cuckoo =

Yellow-billed cuckoo Temporal range: Late Pleistocene–present

Species of bird

The yellow-billed cuckoo (Coccyzus americanus) is a member of the cuckoo family. Common folk names for this bird in the southern United States are rain crow and storm crow. These likely refer to the bird's habit of calling on hot days, often presaging rain showers or thunderstorms. The genus name is from the Ancient Greek kokkuzo, which means to call like a common cuckoo, and americanus means "of America".

== Taxonomy ==
The yellow-billed cuckoo was formally described by the Swedish naturalist Carl Linnaeus in 1758 in the tenth edition of his Systema Naturae. He placed it with all the other cuckoos in the genus Cuculus and coined the binomial name Cuculus americanus. Linnaeus based his description on the "Cuckow of Carolina" that had been described and illustrated in 1729–1732 by the English naturalist Mark Catesby in his The Natural History of Carolina, Florida and the Bahama Islands. The yellow-billed cuckoo is now placed with 12 other species in the genus Coccyzus that was introduced in 1816 by the French ornithologist Louis Pierre Vieillot. The genus name is from the Ancient Greek kokkuzō meaning "to cry cuckoo". The species is monotypic: no subspecies are recognised.

== Description ==
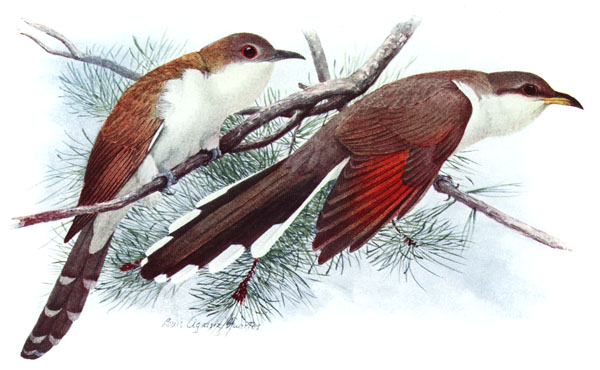
Comparison of black-billed cuckoo (left) and yellow-billed cuckoo

Adults have a long tail, brown above and black-and-white below, and a black curved bill with yellow especially on the lower mandible. The head and upper parts are brown and the underparts are white. There is a yellow ring around the eye. It shows cinnamon on the wings in flight. Juveniles are similar, but the black on the undertail is replaced by gray. The adults show no sexual dimorphism, and thus the males and females can't be told apart by plumage.

Measurements:

- Length: 10.2-11.8 in (26–30 cm)
- Weight: 1.9-2.3 oz (55–65 g)
- Wingspan: 15.0-16.9 in (38–43 cm)

== Distribution and habitat ==
Their breeding habitat is deciduous woods from southern Canada to Mexico and the Caribbean. They migrate to Central America and as far south as northern Argentina. This bird is a rare vagrant in western Europe.

== Behavior and ecology ==
=== Food and feeding ===
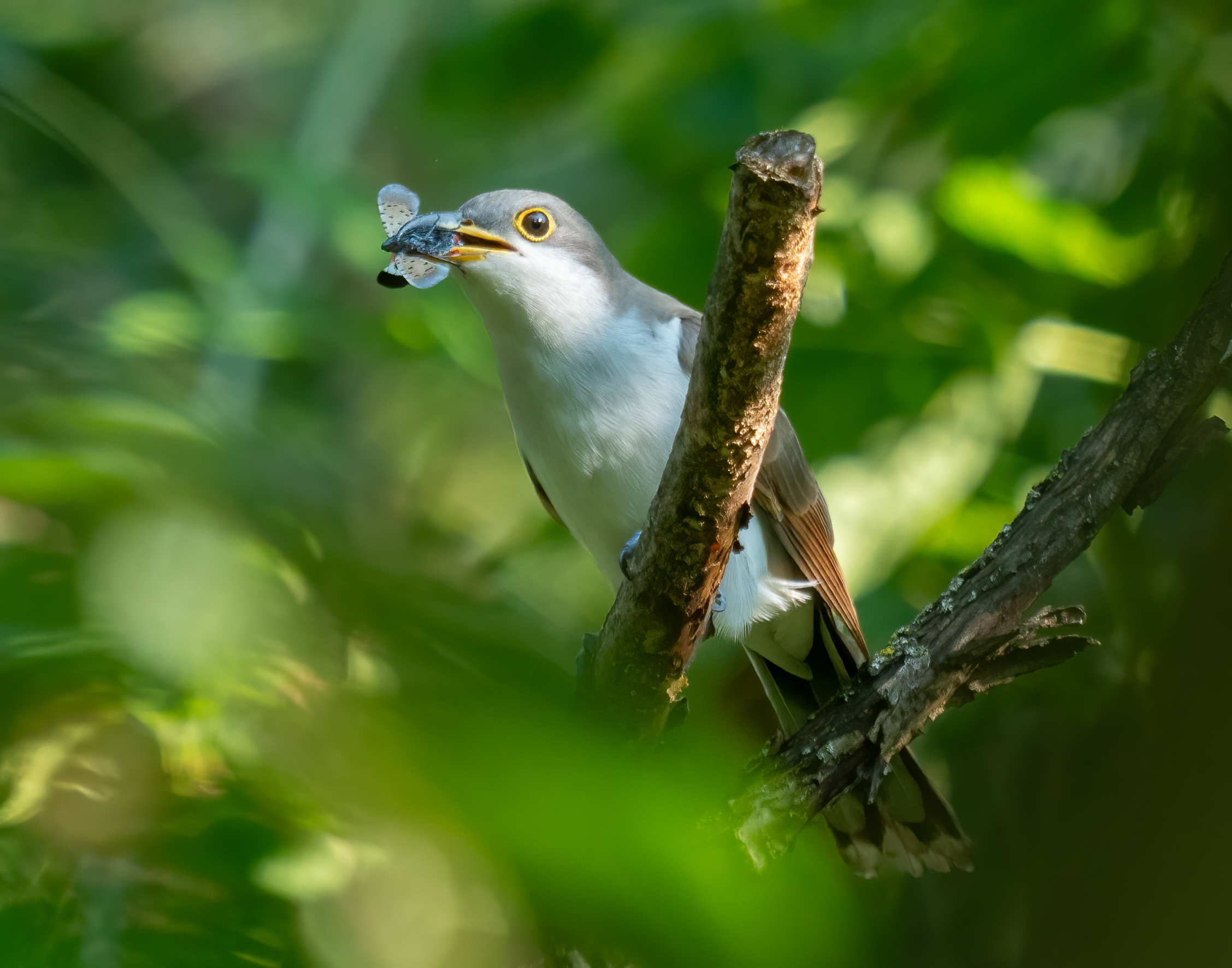
Eating a spotted lanternfly

These birds forage in dense shrubs and trees and also may catch insects in flight. They mainly eat insects, especially tent caterpillars and cicadas, but also some lizards, eggs of other birds, and berries. Cuckoos sometimes congregate near insect outbreaks or emergences, including outbreaks of exotic spongy moth caterpillars.

=== Breeding ===
They nest in a tree or shrub, usually up to 2–12 feet (1–4 meters) above the ground. The nest is a flimsy platform of short twigs placed on a horizontal branch. The 3–4 eggs are incubated for 14 days or less. The chicks are able to climb about with agility at 7–9 days of age. At about this same time, the feathers of the chicks burst out of their sheaths and the young are able to fly. The entire time from egg-laying to fledging may be as little as 17 days. Yellow-billed cuckoos occasionally lay eggs in the nests of other birds (most often the closely related black-billed cuckoo), but they are not obligate brood parasites of other birds as is the common cuckoo of Eurasia.

=== Migration ===
Yellow-billed Cuckoos are long-distance neotropical migrants, breeding in North America and the Caribbean and wintering in South America. Birds that breed in eastern North America migrate via the Caribbean while birds that breed in western North America move down the western slope of Mexico and Central America.

These cuckoos are some of the only birds that will undertake large-scale movements in the middle of the breeding season. Around 75% of cuckoos will travel an average of 965 km between two sites during the breeding season, likely in order to take advantage of changing resource availability at different sites and raise two successive broods of eggs. The northwestern Mexican breeding population has been hypothesized to be entirely composed of birds that bred earlier in the year in the eastern United States.

== Conservation status ==
There is an ongoing debate regarding the taxonomic status of the Western race and whether it is distinct from those birds in the east. This question is significant to the conservation status of this species in the west, where it has declined to a tiny fraction of its population a century ago. Populations of this species in western North America are in steep decline. The bird disappeared from British Columbia, Washington, and Oregon during the first half of the twentieth century. Eastern populations have declined as well, though not as precipitously. The United States Fish and Wildlife Service (USFWS) listed the western Distinct Population Segment (DPS) of Yellow-billed Cuckoos as threatened under the Endangered Species Act on 11/3/2014, and the service also has established 546,335 acres in nine western states as critical habitat for the western DPS of the yellow-billed cuckoo. Controversy over the taxonomic status and heavy pressure from livestock and mining industries caused the first Trump administration to attempt to end the species' protections, and the FWS reviewed the bird's listing. In September 2020, the USFWS determined that the western DPS of yellow-billed cuckoo is distinct, and the listing as Threatened is warranted.
