= Plocoscelus podagricus =

Scientific classification
- Kingdom: Animalia
- Phylum: Arthropoda
- Class: Insecta
- Order: Diptera
- Family: Micropezidae
- Genus: Plocoscelus
- Species: P. podagricus

Binomial name
- Plocoscelus podagricus Rondani, 1848

Synonyms
- Cardiacephala elegans Hendel, 1936

Species of fly

Plocoscelus podagricus is a species of fly in the family Micropezidae. It is found in Brazil and Peru.
