= Badisis =

Scientific classification
- Kingdom: Animalia
- Phylum: Arthropoda
- Clade: Pancrustacea
- Class: Insecta
- Order: Diptera
- Family: Micropezidae
- Subfamily: Eurybatinae
- Genus: Badisis; McAlpine, 1990
- Species: B. ambulans

Binomial name
- Badisis ambulans McAlpine, 1990
- Global range of Albany pitcher plant: maximum range of Badisis ambulans

Genus of flies

Badisis is a stilt-legged fly genus with only one known species, Badisis ambulans. This is a wingless, haltere-less fly with an ant-like appearance. It is only found in the Southwest Australian bioregion of Western Australia. Dependent on the rare Albany pitcher plant (Cephalotus follicularis) for its development, this fly is also a rare species.

Despite its many apomorphic features, the details of its morphology suggest a close relationship to the diverse genus Metopochetus, which is also in the tribe Metopochetini. The fossil stilt-legged fly Electrobata tertiaria from Baltic amber of the Paleogene also shows some similarities; it may be a very basal member of the Metopochetini, close to the divergence between these and the Eurybatinae.

== Description ==
Apart from its lack of wings and halteres, B. ambulans has a less unusual habitus than other members of the Micropezidae. Its body is stockier, with a petiolate abdomen (like in ants and other Apocrita), its middle and hind legs are less elongated, and its forelegs are less shortened than in its relatives. At a casual glance, it is easier to confuse with an ant than with other micropezid flies. The two sexes are almost identical; they can be told apart essentially just by microscopic study of the tip of the abdomen. The larva is adapted to its strange habitat, the pitchers of the Albany pitcher plant. In third-instar larvae (and likely in others too), the slits of the posterior spiracle are entirely closed.

=== Head ===
The compound eyes are as large like in Metopochetus, an unusual feature among wingless Diptera, many of which lack them altogether. The third antennal segment of Badisis is elongate-oval. There are usually three bristles (setae) on each side of the "forehead". Rare among stilt-legged flies but also found in Metopochetus, there is a knob below the postvertical bristles. The prelabrum is large but not markedly projected forward at the lower margin.

=== Thorax ===
The scutellum is distinctly visible but rather small. Like in most other Eurybatinae, there is no groove connecting the mesoscutal transverse sutures across the centerline of the mesothorax. The metathorax has a dorsal sclerite shaped like a saddle.

=== Abdomen ===
The petiole is formed by the first two segments of the abdomen, the first of which has a slight bulge on the tergite. In the male the postabdomen is highly characteristic, the sternite of the 5th postabdominal segment is shallow divided into 2 lobes, each of which bears two or three stout bristles at the tip; the entire structure is very similar to that of Electrobata tertiaria. The 6th sternite is triradiate like in Metopochetus, but like in Eurybatini not compressed laterally and with a trough-like channel in the middle. The subepandrial sclerite of male Badisis has a very small prominence with a minute setula at its tip. The aedeagus with its moderately long two-segmented distiphallus resembles that of Metopochetus subgenus Crus. On the other hand, the ejaculatory sclerite of Badisis is unlike that of any known Metopochetus, with a rod-like apodeme expanded at the tip like a mushroom-head. Females show the conventional postabdominal structure of stilt-legged flies.

=== Legs ===
The coxa of the forelegs has a tooth-like lobe on the lower forward end. Such a feature is apparently only found in Badisis and Metopochetus. The tibiae of mid- and hindlegs bear fine hairs (setulae) and numerous but scattered thicker bristles.

== Ecology and status ==
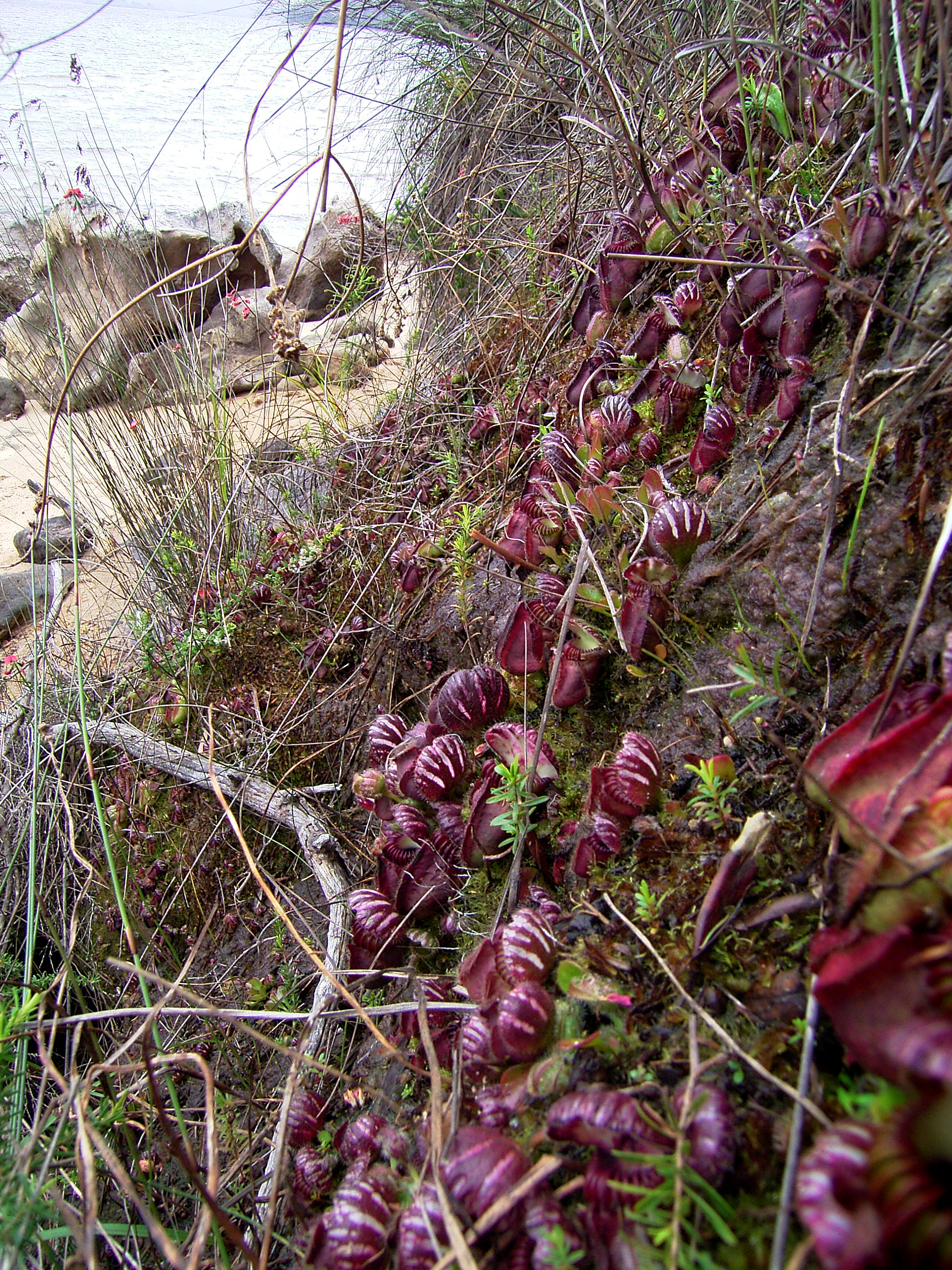
Albany pitcher plant in habitat

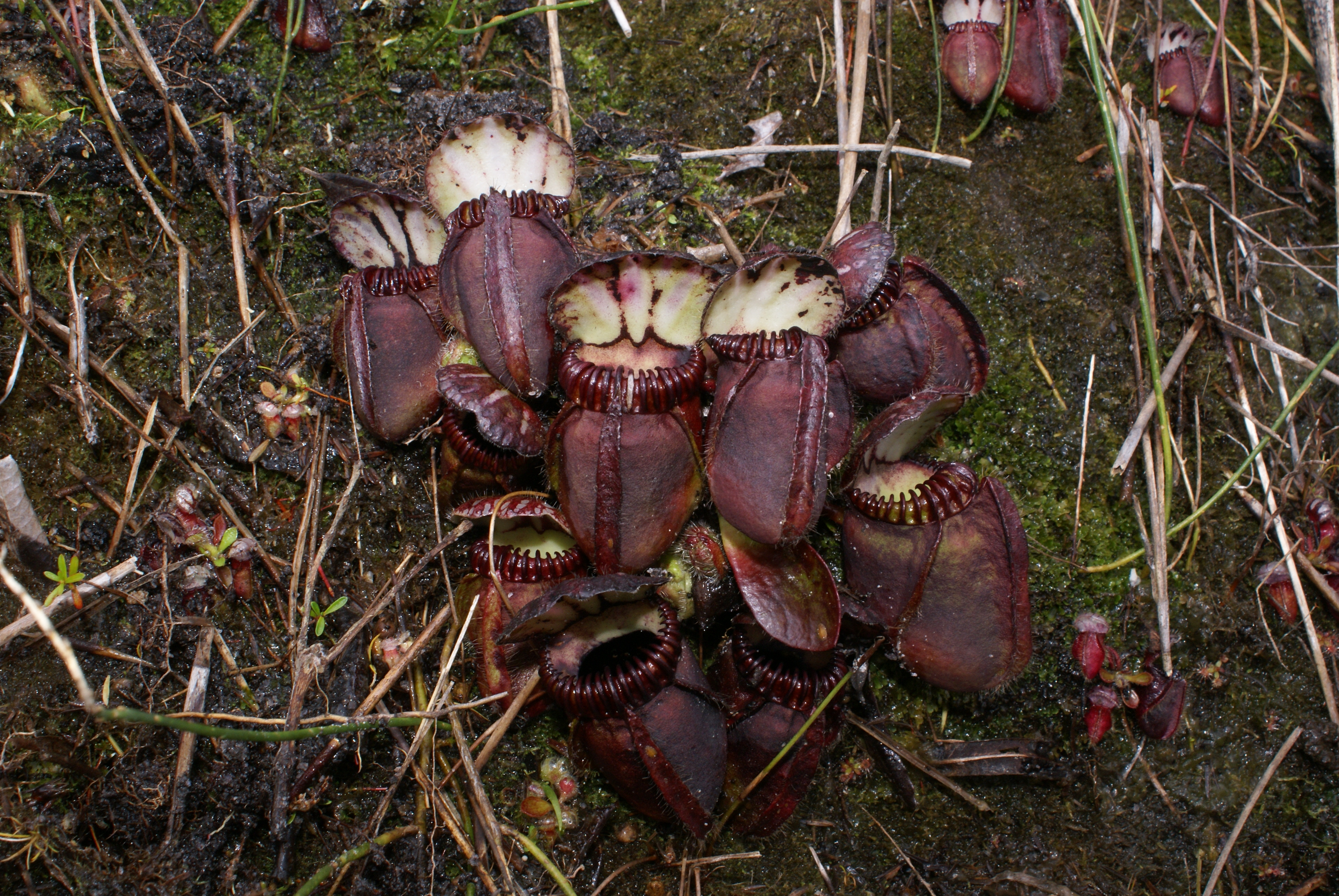
Pitchers of the Albany pitcher plant are where B. ambulans larvae live.

Males are far more often seen than females; the latter were only described 8 years after the former. As far as is known, B. ambulans inhabits sclerophyll forest, where the males are occasionally encountered on flowers of the Myrtaceae shrub Astartea fascicularis. If they feel threatened, they will try to escape by hopping and letting themselves drop down to the ground where they can hide.

The larvae have to date only been found in the pitchers of the Albany pitcher plant (Cephalotus follicularis). This carnivorous plant has a limited range in southwestern Western Australia, effectively restricting the fly's range as well. Most significantly, the plant is found in the Warren, Jarrah Forest and Esperance Plains biogeographic regions.

The conservation status of B. ambulans has not been evaluated yet. The Albany pitcher plant is classified as a Vulnerable species by the IUCN. Its numbers are declining, mainly due to habitat destruction and collecting for horticulture (though there is by now a good supply of culture-grown plants, which are also far easier to maintain than those collected from the wild). The Albany pitcher plant prefers somewhat moister habitat than the fairly arid locations where adult B. ambulans have been collected. Thus, the adult flies may be more mobile than their winglessness suggests, able to walk for prolonged distances, and consequently more resilient to local extinctions of the Albany pitcher plant. On the other hand, the flies might be restricted to the dry spectrum of the plant's habitat, making them more localized and consequently even more threatened than the plant is.
