= Flora and fauna of the Kerguelen Islands =

Nesting birds of the Kerguelen Islands

Binomial name
Common name
Spheniscidae

Aptenodytes patagonicus
King penguin

Pygoscelis papua
Gentoo penguin

Pygoscelis kerguelensis
Southeastern gentoo penguin

Eudyptes chrysolophus
Macaroni penguin

Eudyptes chrysocome
Southern rockhopper penguin
Procellariidae

Diomedea exulans
Wandering albatross

Thalassarche melanophris
Black-browed albatross

Thalassarche chrysostoma
Grey-headed albatross

Phoebetria fusca
Sooty albatross

Phoebetria palpebrata
Light-mantled albatross

Macronectes halli
Giant petrel

Daption capense
Cape petrel

Pachyptila belcheri
Slender-billed prion

Pachyptila desolata
Antarctic prion

Halobaena caerulea
Blue petrel

Pterodroma macroptera
Great-winged petrel

Pterodroma lessonii
White-headed petrel

Pterodroma brevirostris
Kerguelen petrel

Procellaria aequinoctialis
White-chinned petrel

Procellaria cinerea
Grey petrel
Hydrobatidae

Oceanites oceanicus
Wilson's storm-petrel

Fregetta tropica
Black-bellied storm-petrel

Garrodia nereis
Grey-backed storm-petrel
Pelecanoididae

Pelecanoides georgicus
South Georgian diving petrel

Pelecanoides urinatrix
Common diving petrel
Phalacrocoracidae

Phalacrocorax verrucosus
Kerguelen shag
Anatidae

Anas eatoni
Eaton's pintail
Chionididae

Chionis minor
Black-faced sheathbill
Stercorariidae

Stercorarius skua
Great skua
Laridae

Larus dominicanus
Kelp gull

Sterna virgata
Kerguelen tern

Sterna vittata
Antarctic tern

The Kerguelen Islands are part of the Southern Indian Ocean Islands tundra ecoregion that includes several subantarctic islands. In this cold climate plant life is mainly limited to grasses, mosses and lichens, although the islands are also known for the indigenous edible Kerguelen cabbage. The islands are at the Antarctic Convergence, where cold water moving up from the Antarctic mixes with the warmer water of the Indian Ocean. As a consequence, marine mammals, especially seals, and seabirds and penguins are numerous.

== Fauna ==
=== Mammals ===
Seals and fur seals:

- Southern elephant seal (Mirounga leonina)
- Antarctic fur seal (Arctophoca gazella)
- Leopard seal (Hydrurga leptonyx) occasional

Cetaceans:

- Commerson's dolphin (Cephalorhynchus commersonii)
- Type D or Sub-Antarctic orca (Orcinus orca).
- Humpback whale (Megaptera novaeangliae)
- Southern right whale (Eubalaena australis), etc.

Introduced land mammals:

- Bizet sheep. Approximately 3,500 semi-wild sheep once lived on Ile Longue; their main purpose is to provide meat for the scientific personnel stationed on the islands. Oddly, the Kerguelen flock of sheep, which are known as Bizet sheep, are an endangered breed in continental France from where they originated. On Kerguelen, the lambs suffer a higher rate of mortality, due to poor adaptation to the Southern Hemisphere. The ewes often gave birth either in winter when food is scarce, or in midsummer, after the most favorable spring period. By 2014 there were 150 male Bizet with no females. These were eradicated by 2016.
- Mouflons (mountain sheep). Numbering approximately 100 or so individuals, they originated from the island of Corsica, and were introduced in 1959. The Kerguelen population was restricted to Haute Island in the Golfe du Morbihan. As part of ongoing efforts to remove introduced species, the population was eradicated by 2012.
- Reindeer. Reindeer were introduced to Ile des Rennes (Reindeer Island), also called Ile Australia, by the Norwegians. Reindeer are excellent swimmers and they soon found their way to the main island of La Grande Terre a short distance away. Today the reindeer of the Kerguelen islands number around 4,000 individuals. They have been able to survive due to their ability to extract sufficient nutrients from the islands' lichens and mosses; however, their presence has had a negative impact on the flora of the archipelago. They form the only such population in the Southern Hemisphere, apart from a similarly introduced reindeer population on South Georgia which was almost eradicated in 2013, the last two being killed in 2017.
- Rabbits. These small lagomorphs were brought in from South Africa in 1874. They were reintroduced on a second occasion later. The rationale was to provide a fresh food source to sailors who might become shipwrecked. Rabbits have devastated the islands' plant communities, and have caused serious erosion in places where their numbers have exploded - mostly the eastern half of the islands, where population densities have reached 40+ per acre in some places. To date, the western and northwestern limits of the islands have been spared due to a less hospitable climate. The off-lying islands surrounding the archipelago have also been spared. Rabbits were introduced to Ile Verte, but were eradicated by 1992.
- Rats and mice. These were introduced to the islands by ships which were hunting seals and whales.
- Cats. The islands are home to a population of feral cats descended from ships' cats kept by sailors to control the rat population. The cats live mainly on mice, rabbits and albatross chicks. A later cat introduction was made in 1956.
- Dogs. These were also introduced to the islands by ships which were hunting seals and whales; there were some feral dogs reported on the islands between 1852 and 1951, but none have been seen since.
- Equines. Mules were introduced to Port-aux-Français in 1948 and lived there for five years; there were also reports of Shetland ponies living there in the 1950s.

=== Birds ===
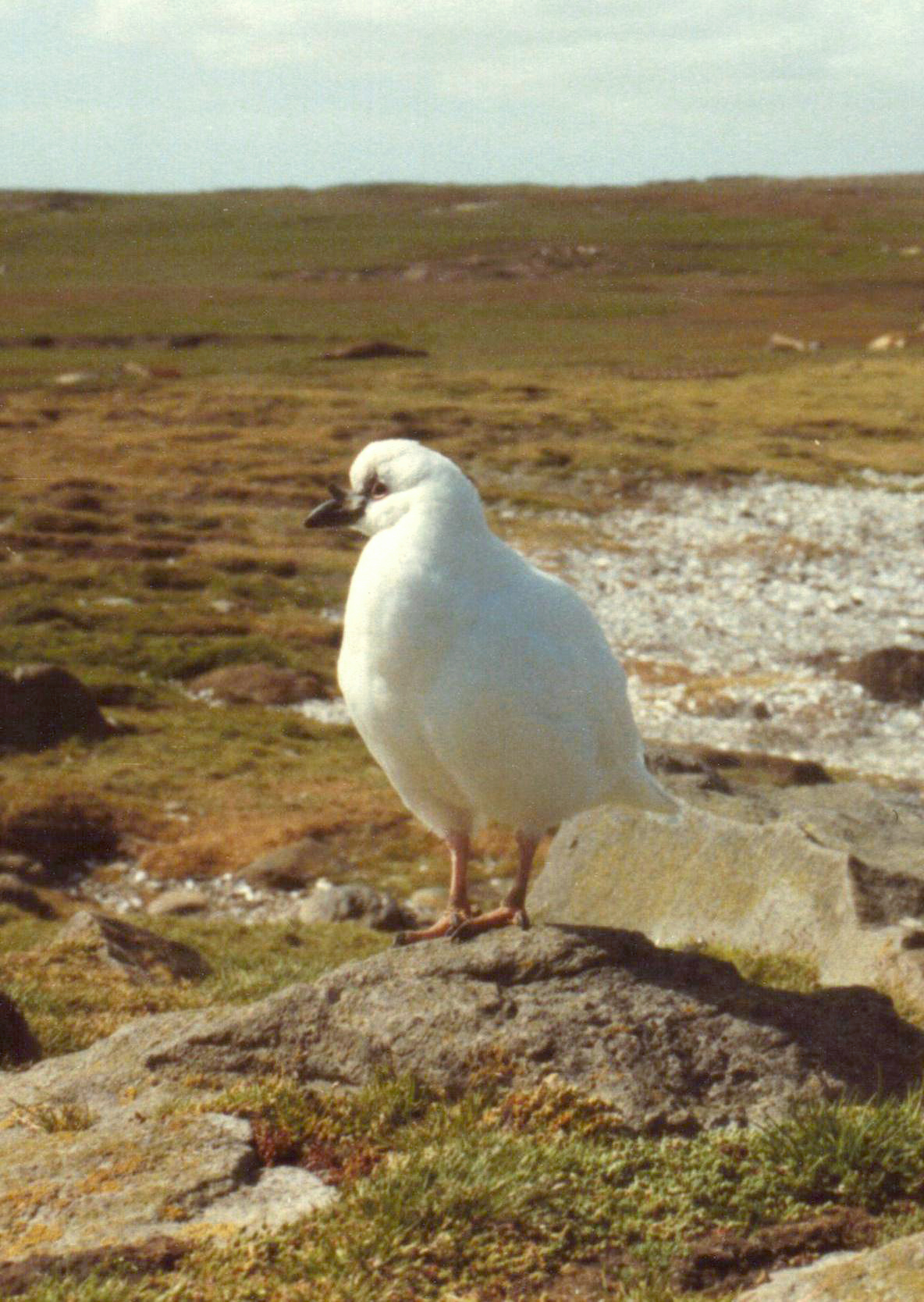
Black-faced sheathbill (Chionis minor)

Penguins:

- King penguin (Aptenodytes patagonicus)
- Gentoo penguin (Pygoscelis papua)
- Southeastern gentoo penguin (Pygoscelis kerguelensis)
- Southern rockhopper penguin (Eudyptes chrysocome)
- Macaroni penguin (Eudyptes chrysolophus)

Seabirds:

- Albatross
- Black-faced sheathbill
- Cormorants
- Kerguelen petrel
- Kerguelen shag
- Seagulls
- Prions
- Skuas
- Kerguelen tern

The Kerguelen Islands are covered by France's ratification of the International Agreement on the Conservation of Albatrosses and Petrels, drawn up under the auspices of the Convention on Migratory Species.

Anseriformes:

- Eaton's pintail (Anas eatoni)
- Mallard (Anas platyrhynchos) introduced

=== Fish ===
In the 1950s and 1960s, Edgar Albert de la Rue, a French geologist began the introduction of several species of salmonids. Of the seven species introduced, only brook trout Salvelinus fontinalis and brown trout Salmo trutta survived to establish wild populations. Brook trout occupy head water streams, while brown trout have established both resident stream and robust anadromous populations throughout the islands.

=== Insects ===
A few species of insects inhabit these islands, some examples are the:

- Calycopteryx mosleyi, a fly closely associated with the Kerguelen cabbage.
- Meropathus chuni, a very small aquatic beetle.
- Anatalanta
- Palirhoeus eatoni

As well as some introduced species like the:

- Oopterus soledadinus, a large ground beetle.
- Merizodus soledadinus, a flightless beetle.

== Flora ==
=== Land vegetation ===
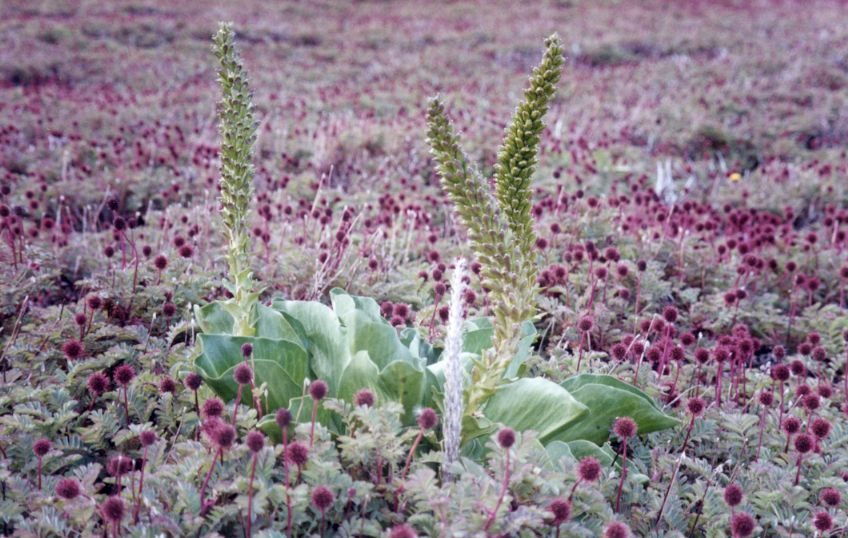
Kerguelen cabbage in a field of Acaena.

The coastal regions, up to an altitude of about 50 m, are generally covered with low herbaceous vegetation, and are classified as tundra. Higher up, rocky ground dominates and the vegetation is rarer, limited to scattered tufts and mosses and lichens.

There are no trees or shrubs on the islands. This was not always the case, however. Fossilized tree trunks of the family Araucariaceae can be found in certain sediments, geological witnesses of times when Kerguelen had a warmer climate than today.

Originally, the main type of low altitude vegetation consisted of a thick and continuous carpet of azorellae (Azorella selago) on which could be established various other species such as the famous Kerguelen cabbage, Pringlea antiscorbutica (family Brassicaceae). The azorella (Apiaceae) had a pillow-shaped growth: the year's growth forming a tight layer which superimposed itself on the previous year's growth. The species Lyallia kerguelensis (Hectorellaceae), the only strictly endemic species of the archipelago, has a similar growth pattern. The pillows of azorellae could exceed 1 meter in thickness and adjacent plants could join to form a continuous sheet. Walking on this kind of vegetation was very difficult and was environmentally harmful. On the other hand, this tender medium was ideal for certain species of marine birds which could dig nest burrows there.

The introduction and proliferation of rabbits destroyed this habitat, which was replaced by a monospecific meadow constituted of a plant resembling a small salad burnet, Acaena adscendens (Rosaceae). Today one can find the carpets of azorellae only on the islands and islets undamaged by rabbits. The Kerguelen cabbage underwent practically the same fate. The establishment of other mammals also had consequences on the vegetation: consumption of the seeds of the Kerguelen cabbage by mice, reducing its regeneration capacities, consumption of the lichens by reindeer, etc.

In the flat bottoms and close to brooks, the ground is often soaked. A boggy vegetation mainly constituted of mosses may develop there. This vegetation can appear homogeneous on the surface but can be covering quicksand, in which hikers may sink to the waist.

=== Marine vegetation ===
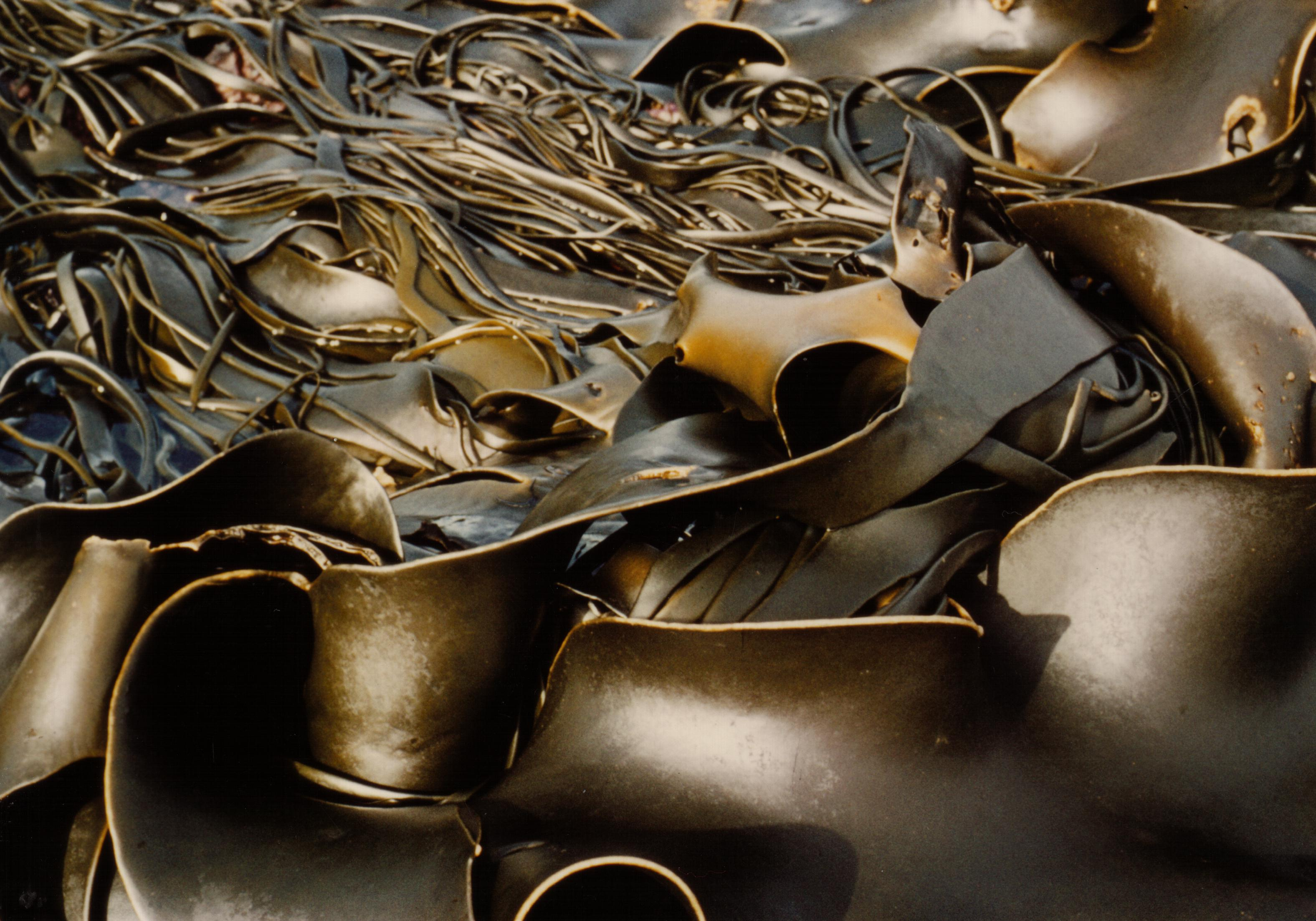
Thin straps of floating Durvillaea forming a coastal belt

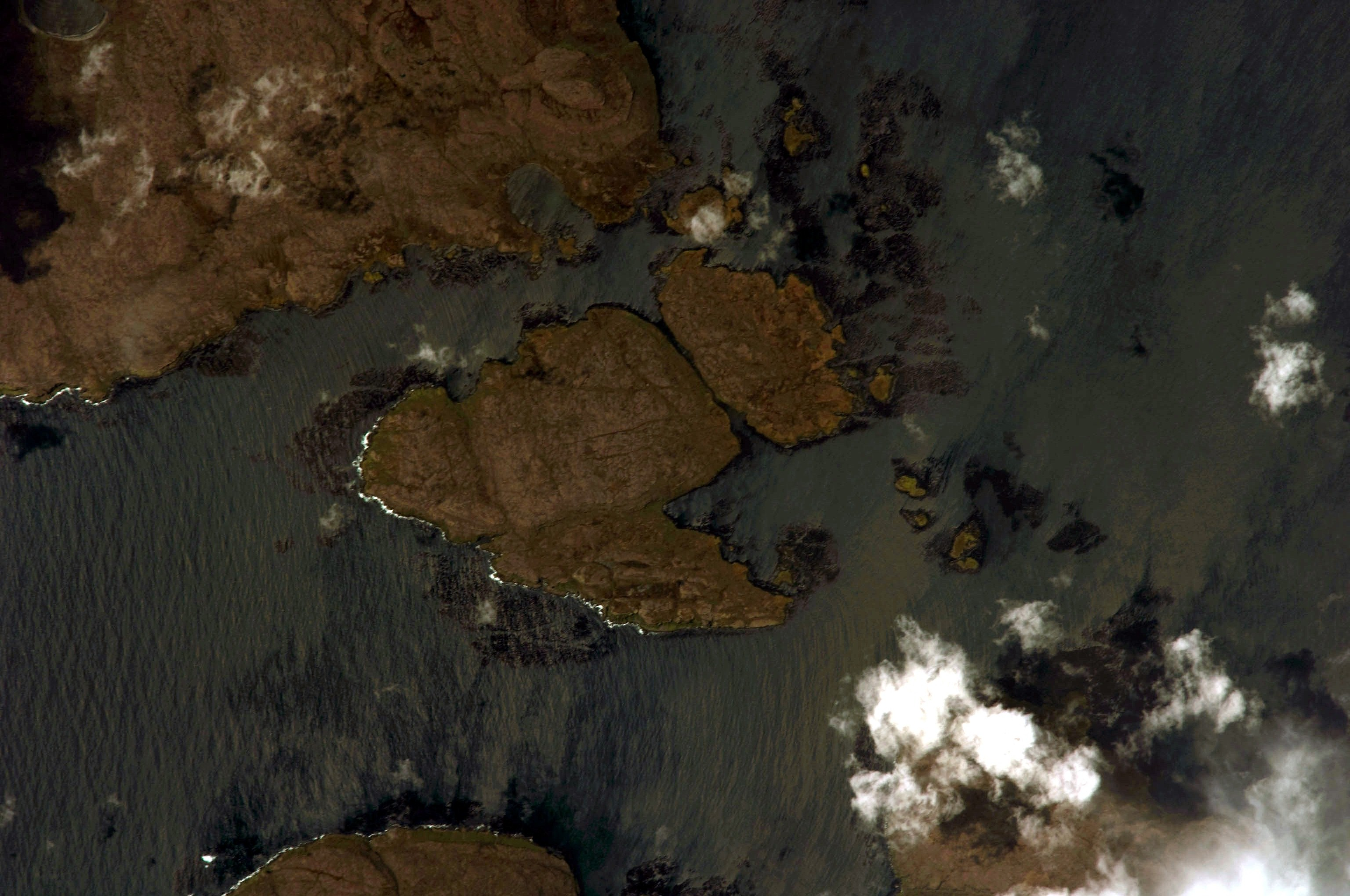
Kelp beds off the coast of the Kerguelen Islands as seen from space

Unlike the terrestrial vegetation which is very poorly developed, the marine flora is flourishing, in particular thanks to the presence of giant brown algae: the kelp (Macrocystis pyrifera), which form underwater forests, and the cochayuyo (Durvillaea antarctica), which covers most of the rock coasts.

The Macrocystis are one of the largest types of marine macroalgae, the species can grow to lengths of 50 meters, forming undersea forests in hard-bottom, subtidal areas. Attached to the bottom by branched holdfasts, the algae grow up to the surface in the form of columns made of several dozen interwoven cords. They then spread out widely on the surface thanks to floaters placed at the base of multiple slings similar to corrugated sheets. The kelp can cover wide areas where navigation is practically impossible because the thin straps can get entangled in ships' propellers and block them. The kelp forests in the Kerguelen Islands are home to relatively few vertebrates but many colourful invertebrates as well as a great diversity of red algae. The storms regularly tear off large quantities of giant algae that wash ashore and rot on the beaches in the form of a mattress which can reach several meters thickness. These wash-ups of algae form one of the essential bases of the local ecosystem.
