= Calycopteryx =

Scientific classification
- Kingdom: Animalia
- Phylum: Arthropoda
- Clade: Pancrustacea
- Class: Insecta
- Order: Diptera
- Family: Micropezidae
- Genus: Calycopteryx; Eaton, 1875
- Species: C. mosleyi

Binomial name
- Calycopteryx mosleyi Eaton, 1875

Genus of flies

Calycopteryx is a genus of stilt-legged flies with only a single recognized species, the Calycopteryx mosleyi (sometimes misspelled moseleyi) native to the Kerguelen Islands and Heard Island of the south Indian Ocean. It is characterized by its tiny size and flightlessness.

== Evolution and taxonomy ==
Calycopteryx mosleyi has wings that have shrunk and turned into a fat reserve, probably due to the strong winds of the Kerguelen archipelago that make flight for tiny insects almost impossible. This could indicate that they migrated from elsewhere to the islands they are currently found and evolved there separately from the other species of the family Micropezidae. They are the only recognized species of the genus.

Two subspecies are recognized:

- Calycopteryx mosleyi mosleyi (Eaton, 1875)
- Calycopteryx mosleyi minor (Enderlein, 1909)

== Description ==
These tiny flies can reach 7 mm in length and have a greenish-brown color. They have very long legs, which are darker than their body. Their abdomen is hairless and matte brown in color. Their larvae are maggots which are white in color.

== Habitat and distribution ==
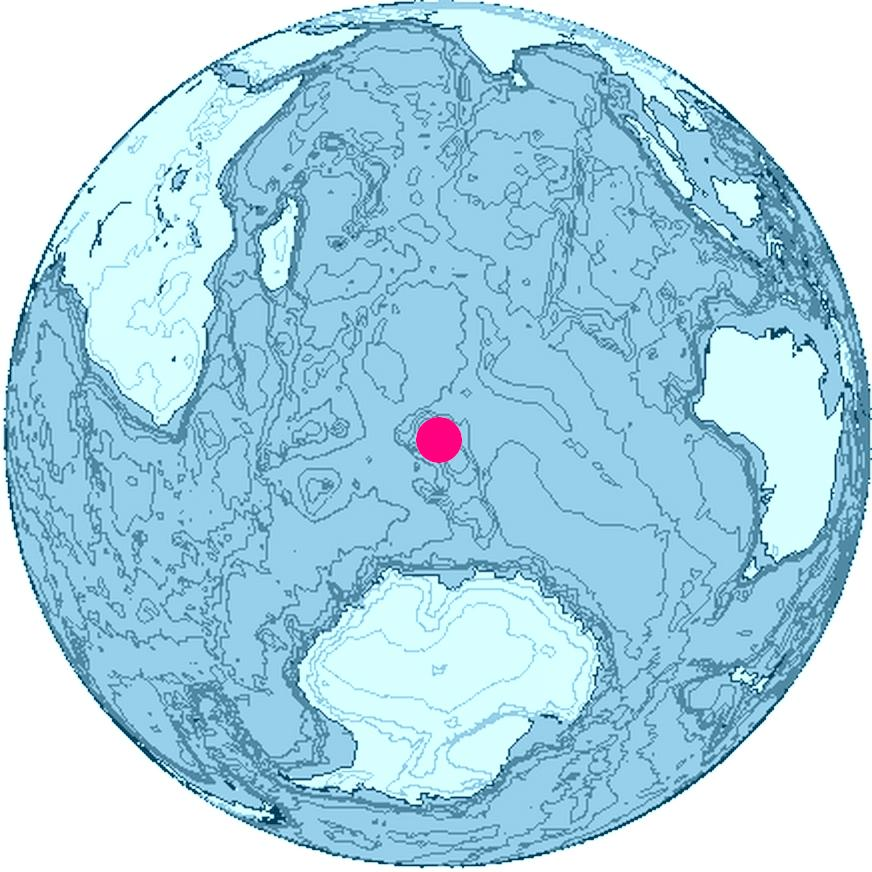
Location of the Kerguelen plateau on the globe, where the Kerguelen Islands and Heard Island are located

Calycopteryx mosleyi lives in the Kerguelen Islands and Heard Island which are part of the Southern Indian Ocean Islands tundra ecoregion. The climate is classified as ET (tundra climate) under the Köppen climate classification, which is technically a form of polar climate, as the average temperature in the warmest month is below 10 °C (50 °F). Apart from the cold, the climate is also characterized by extreme windswept, generally low cloud cover and snowfall occurrence through most of the year.

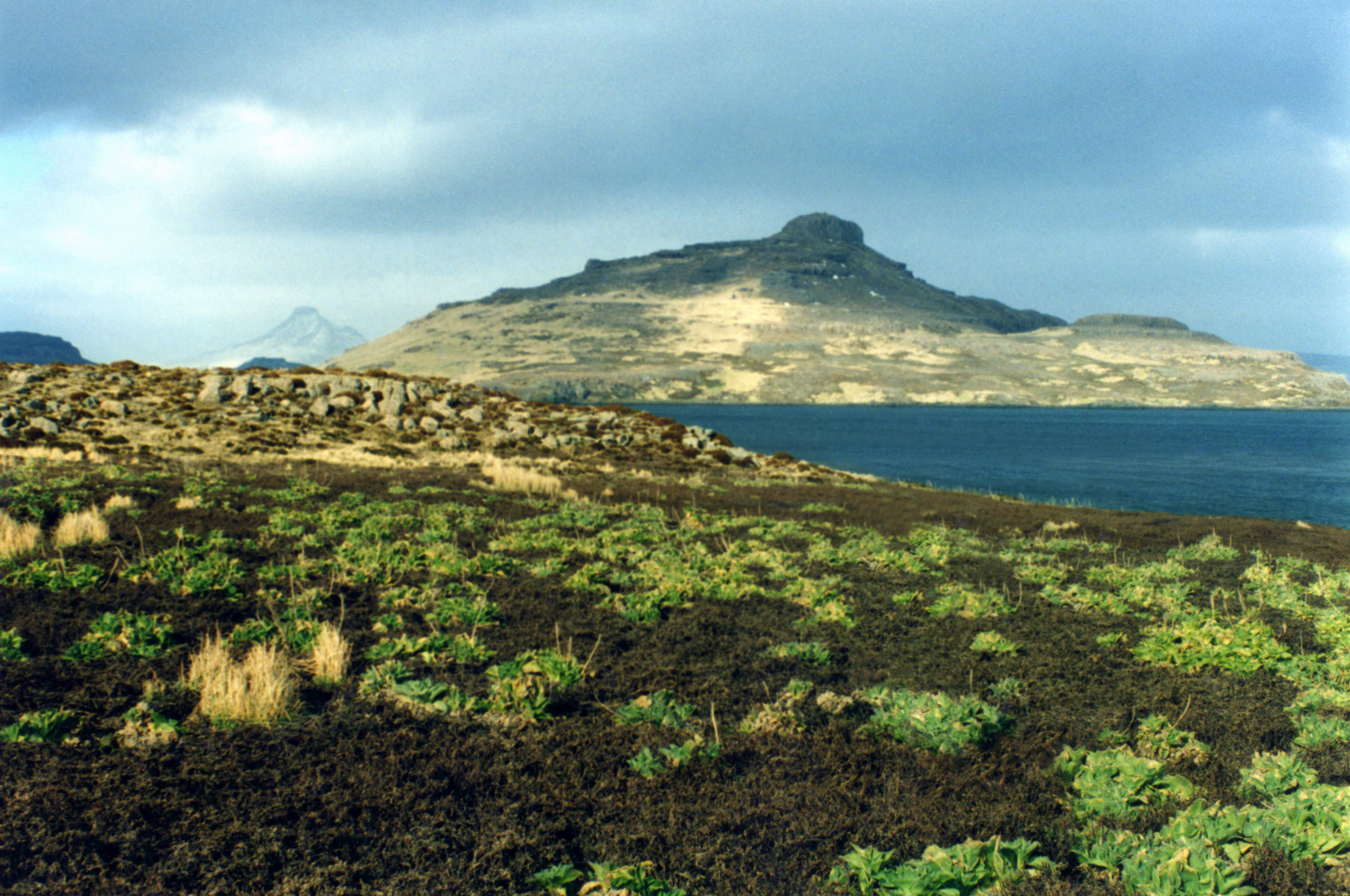
Kerguelen cabbages on Mayes Island (Kerguelen Islands), typical habitat of Calycopteryx mosleyi

They are closely associated with the Kerguelen cabbage, a plant which the individuals of C. mosleyi are its main pollinators, and these flies are typically found in large numbers on the leaves of the Kerguelen cabbages across the islands of the Kerguelen archipelago and Heard Island. This cabbage is a main trophic resource for both adult and larvae of C. mosleyi and many of the flies spent most of their lives on cabbages. Kerguelen cabbages are distributed from littoral margins to further inland and are usually found in non-saline areas. This in combination with the fact that adults of C. mosleyi are found at the axil of the leaves where rainwater is accumulated and salinity is null or low, brought the attention of scientists because it makes C. mosleyi quite exceptional among the invertebrates of subantarctic region, most of which live in environments with high levels of salinity. However, newer studies reveal that there is a large number of C. mosleyi living in areas devoid of Kerguelen cabbages, like seaweed habitats consisting mostly of kelps of the Macrocystis pyrifera species that were washed ashore. They have also been found in other coastal locations, like penguin colonies, where they have a similar role as in the seaweed ecosystems, they decompose organic matter.

== Threats ==
The population of Calycopteryx mosleyi has greatly reduced since the arrival of humans on the islands it inhabits, mostly due to the animals introduced to the ecosystem by them.

Rabbits were brought from South Africa to some of the islands of the Kerguelen archipelago in 1874 and the following years. They have been feeding on the Kerguelen cabbage ever since, resulting in reduction of its population and obviously a destruction of C. mosleyi's habitat in some areas.

In 1913, beetles of the Merizodus soledadinus species of South America were also introduced to the Kerguelen Islands. They prey on the larvae of C. mosleyi and as a result the population of the indigenous flies has declined greatly since the beetle's introduction to the ecosystem. The Merizodus soledadinus could eventually outnumber the Calycopteryx mosleyi in some of the islands resulting in C. mosleyi's disappearance.

Like most of the fauna of the subantarctic, Calycopteryx mosleyi is also threatened by the climate change, with the rising temperature disrupting the balanced ecosystem.
