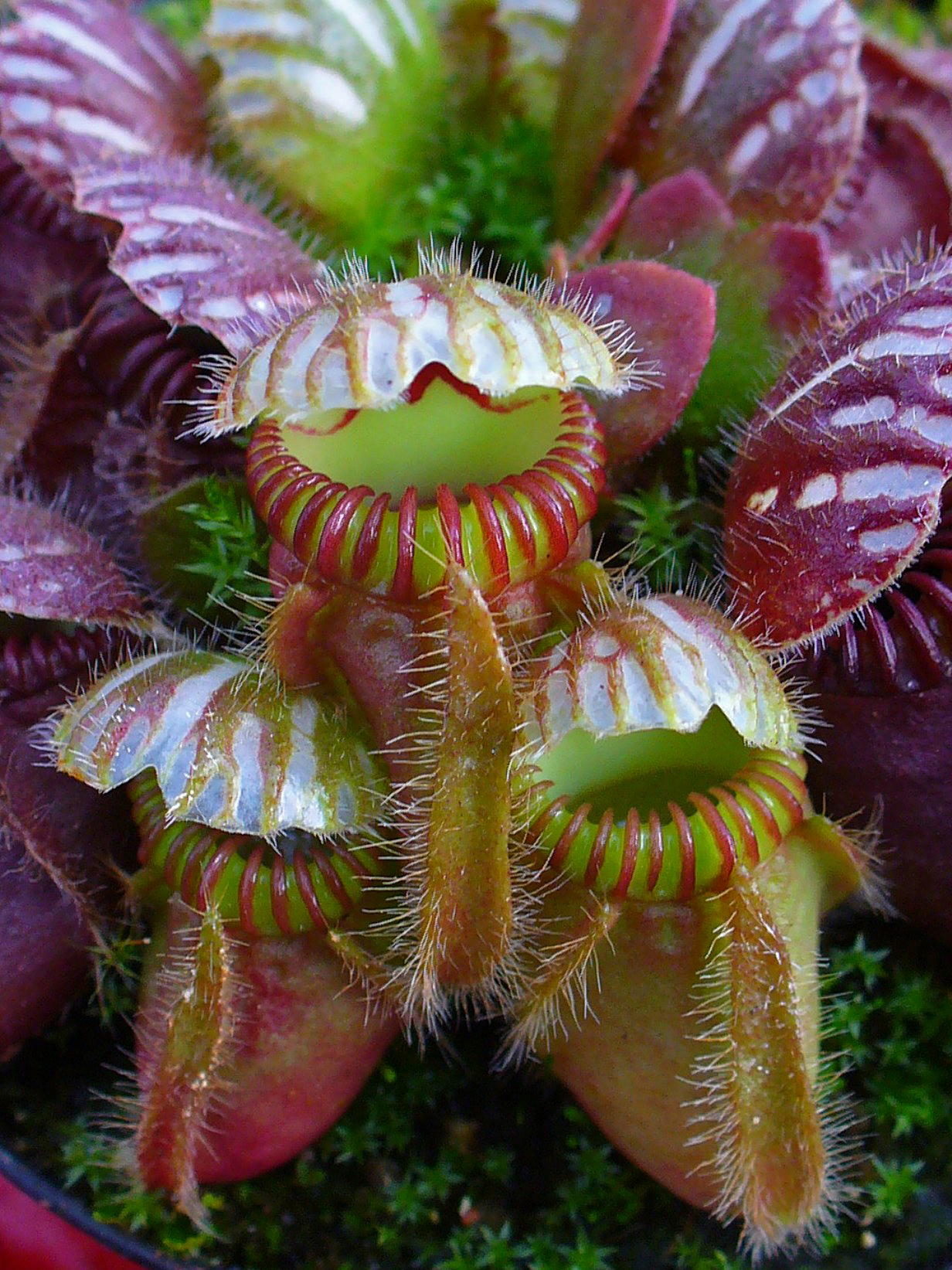

Conservation status
- Vulnerable (IUCN 3.1)

Scientific classification
- Kingdom: Plantae
- Clade: Embryophytes
- Clade: Tracheophytes
- Clade: Spermatophytes
- Clade: Angiosperms
- Clade: Eudicots
- Clade: Rosids
- Order: Oxalidales
- Family: Cephalotaceae; Dumort.
- Genus: Cephalotus; Labill.
- Species: C. follicularis

Binomial name
- Cephalotus follicularis Labill.
- Global range

= Cephalotus =

Genus of carnivorous plants

Cephalotus (/ˌsɛfəˈloʊtəs, ˌkɛ-/; from Greek: κεφαλή 'head' and οὔς/ὠτός 'ear', to describe the head of the anthers) is a genus which contains one species, Cephalotus follicularis the Albany pitcher plant, a small carnivorous pitcher plant. The pit-fall traps of the modified leaves have inspired the common names for this plant, which also include Western Australian pitcher plant, Australian pitcher plant, or fly-catcher plant. It is an evergreen herb that is endemic to peaty swamps in the southwestern corner of Western Australia. As with the unrelated Nepenthes, it catches its victims with pitfall traps.

== Description ==
Cephalotus follicularis is a small, low growing, herbaceous species. Evergreen leaves appear from underground rhizomes, are simple with an entire leaf blade, and lie close to the ground. The insectivorous leaves are small and have the appearance of booties or moccasins, forming the 'pitcher' of the common name. The pitchers develop a dark red colour in high light levels but stay green in shadier conditions. The foliage is a basal arrangement that is closely arranged with outward facing adapted leaf blades. These leaves give the main form of the species a height around 20 cm.

The 'pitcher' trap of the species is similar to other pitcher plants. The peristome at the entrance of the trap has a spiked arrangement that allows the prey to enter, but hinders its escape. The lid over the entrance, the operculum, prevents rainwater entering the pitcher and thus diluting the digestive enzymes inside. Insects trapped in this digestive fluid are consumed by the plant. The operculum has translucent cells which confuse its insect prey as they appear to be patches of sky.

The inflorescence consists of groupings of small, hermaphroditic, six-parted, regular flowers, which are creamy, or whitish.

In the cooler months of winter (down to about 5 degrees Celsius), they have a natural dormancy period of about 3–4 months, triggered by the temperature drop and reduced light levels.

=== Habit ===
The Australian pitcher plant is a wintergreen, long lasting, herbaceous plant, which grows autochthonous rosettes and grows up to a height of 10 centimetres.

The rhizome is bulky, nodose with numerous scaly leaves and many offshoots. New rosettes grow at its stolon so that it forms large tussocks with increasing age. The rhizome grows numerous fibrous roots. Younger plants also have a taproot, which dies when they grow older.

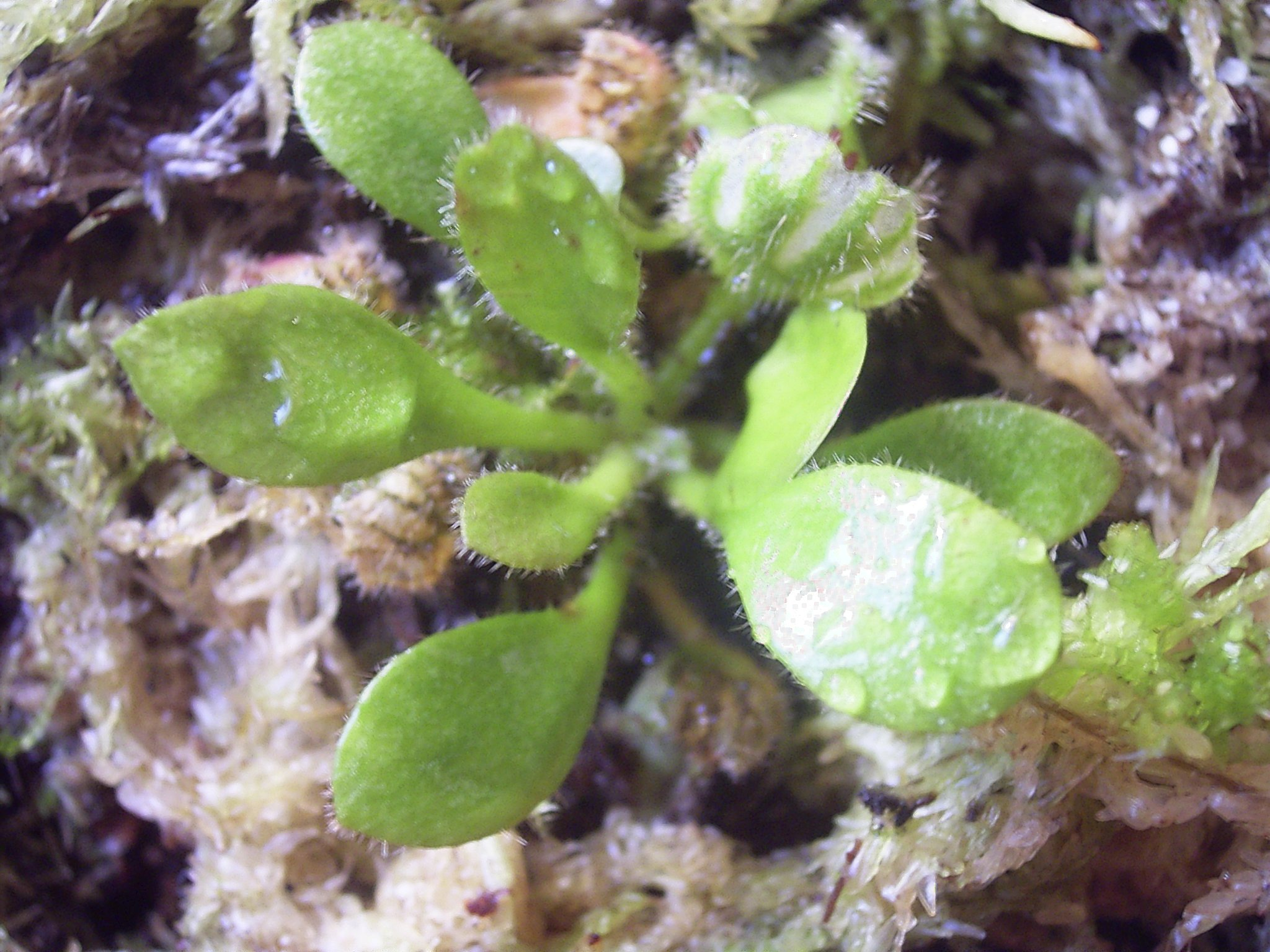
Simple leaves

=== Leaves ===
The Australian pitcher plant grows two kinds of leaves with the change of seasons: simple flat leaves as well as strongly modified trap leaves. Occasionally, there are intermediate forms of leaves with only partially developed traps, lacking the front part. All leaves grow alternating, they are petiolate, with single-celled fine hairs and beset with numerous sessile nectaries. Stipules are absent.

The form of the flat leaves range from spatulate to reverse ovoid. They are pointed and up to 15 centimetres long including the petiole, which occupies half of that length. They are thick and coriaceaous, the edges are fringed while the leaf surface is smooth and glossy.

==== Trap leaves ====
The trap leaves are up to 5 centimeters long, egg-shaped and liquid-filled pitfall traps that are open at the top. They lie on the substrate at an angle of 45° or they are sunk into it in the case of mossy substrates. The petiole is cylindrical and fused to the back of the upper edge of the trap.

Four very hairy ridges on the outside of the traps make it easier for crawling animals to reach the trap opening. The outer skin is completely covered with glands that secrete a liquid, presumably nectar.

A lid over the opening, an outgrowth of the petiole, spans the interior and protects it from rain, which could cause the pitcher fluid to overflow and wash out dead prey. It is curved, notched and ciliated at the edge, lacking a midrib. The inside is covered with short, downward-pointing hairs. The lid is alternately divided into white-translucent and dark red sections without chlorophyll. The translucent sections appear window-like, through which trapped flying insects try to escape, only to fall back into the pitchers afterwards.

The inwardly overhanging, thickened edge of the trap is surrounded by large, inward-pointing, claw-like teeth in between nectar glands. Immediately adjacent to this is an area of short, downward-facing papillae that make it difficult to climb back up. The rest of the inner wall of the cauldron is smooth, so that the prey slips into the trap and cannot climb out of it.

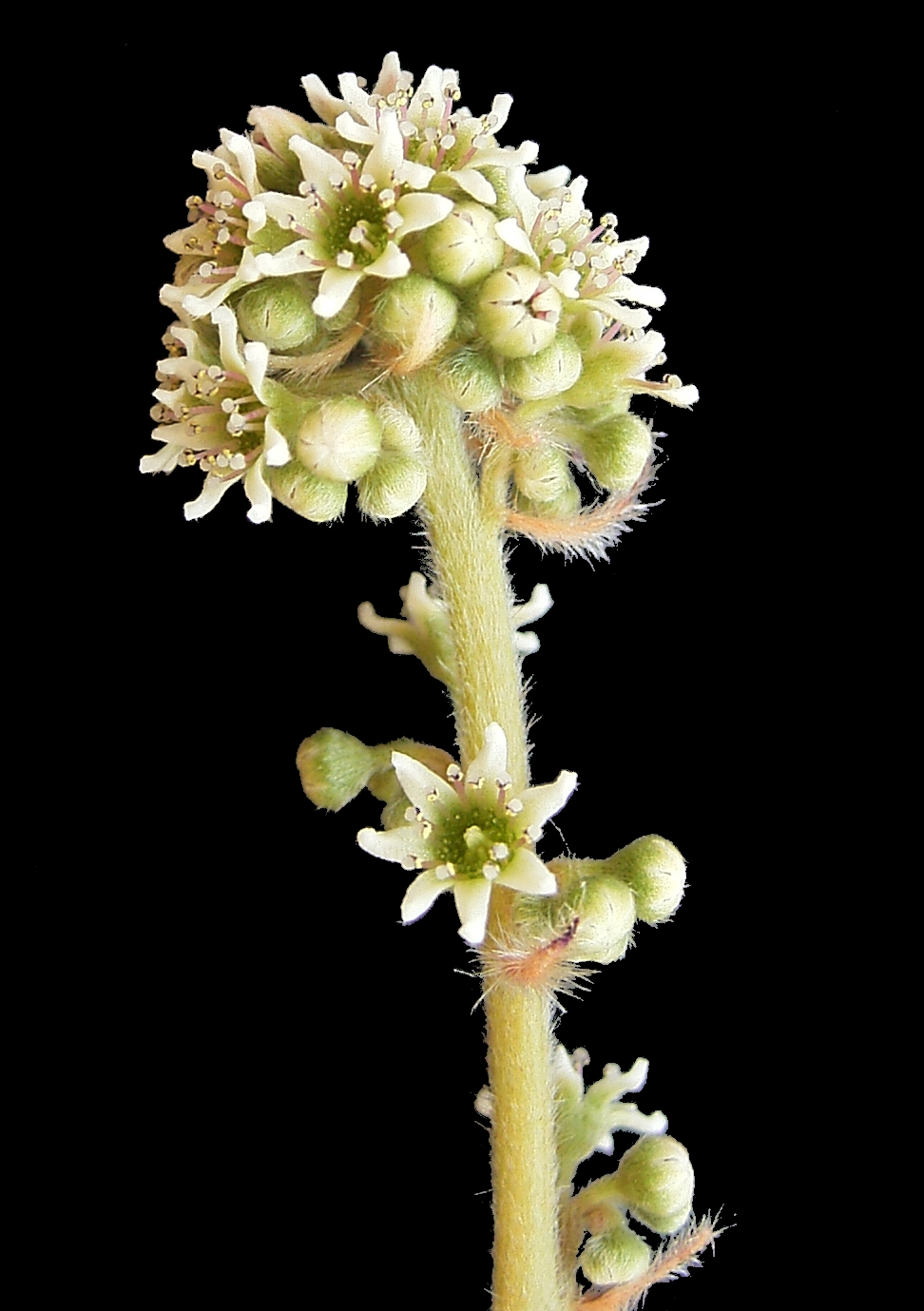
Inflorescence of an Australian pitcher plant

The upper third, or the upper half of the trap leaf, is finely beset with glands. In the lower part of the trap there are two kidney-shaped, red-coloured spots that are densely covered with larger glands. These glands most likely produce the liquid in the can, as well as the digestive enzymes and also absorb the nutrients from the prey.

=== Blossoms, fruit and seeds ===
The single flower stalk appears at the beginning of the Australian summer (flowering time: January–February) and is up to 60 centimetres long, with a panicle at its end. Each of the secondary axes bears up to four or five white, upright, six-cornered flowers, which are up to 7 millimeters in diameter. Petals are absent and the calyx is well developed, with six lobes. The six carpels are not fused. Flowers sag when they are fertilised. The spadiciform leathery, hairy follicle fruits and contain one or two brown, ovoid seeds with a membranous testa and rich, granular endosperm. The seeds are 0.8 millimetres long and 0.4 millimetres wide. The germination only occurs if the seed remains in the fruit.

=== Cytology and constituents ===
The chromosome number is 2n = 20. Tannin cells are present as well as myricetin, quercetin, ellagic acid, gallic acid. However, iridoids are absent.

== Taxonomy ==
The genus as well as the family Cephalotaceae include only this one species, which means they are monotypic. The Cunoniaceae are their nearest relations. Brocchinia reducta and the Australian pitcher plant are the only carnivorous plants that are not part of the orders of Lamiales, Caryophyllales or Ericales and therefore not even indirectly related to other carnivorous plants.

=== Taxonomic history ===
Botanical specimens were first collected during the visit of HMS Investigator to King George Sound in December 1801 and January 1802. On 2 January 1802 the expedition's botanist, Robert Brown, wrote in his diary:

"Remaind on board. Described a few plants. Mr Good went in search of the pitcher plant wch Messrs Bauer & Westall had found yesterday in flower. He returned with it in the evening."

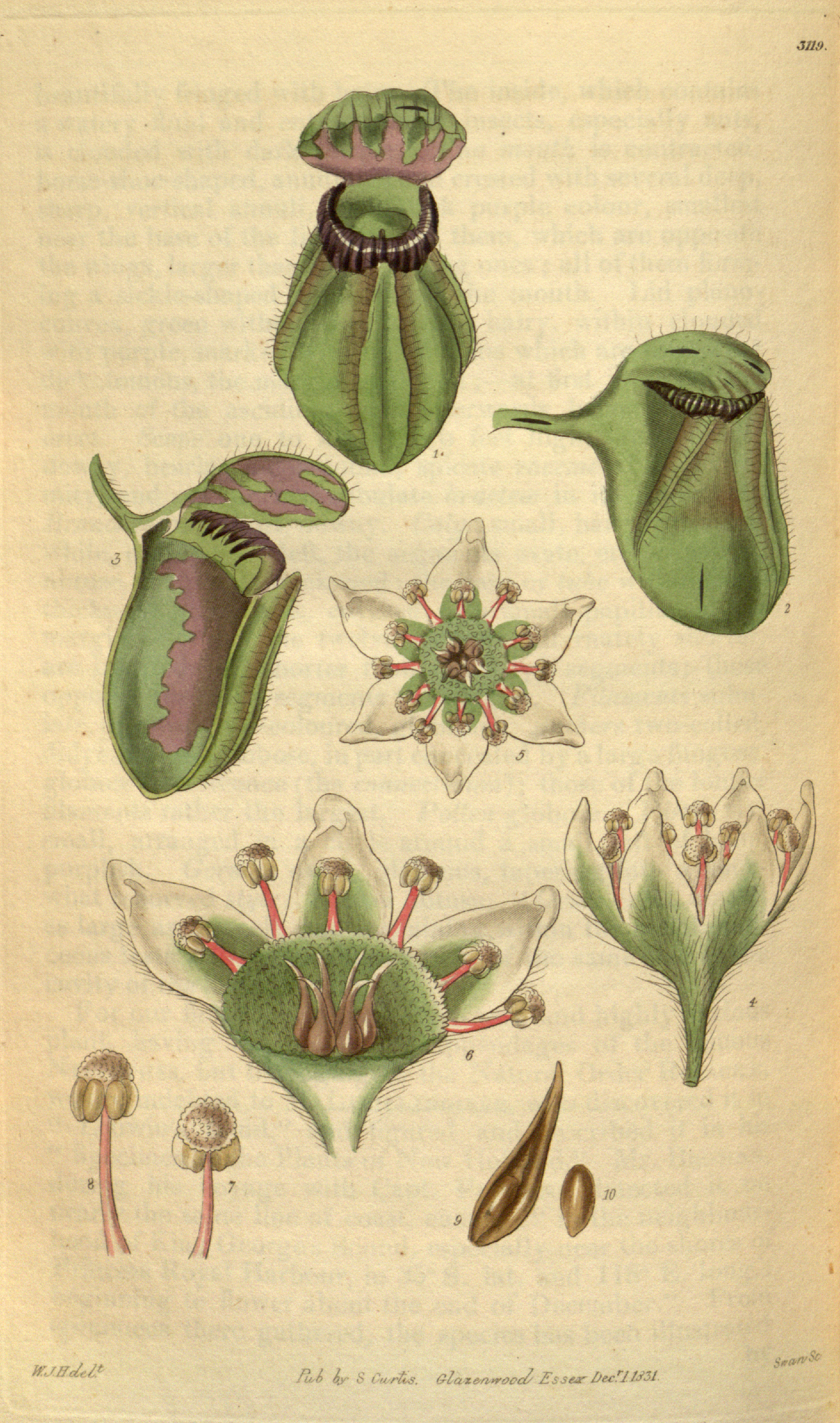
Plate 3119, Curtis's Botanical Magazine, details by Ferdinand Bauer

This represents the earliest documentary reference to this species; and although not entirely unambiguous as to the first collection, it is usually taken as evidence that the plant was discovered by Ferdinand Bauer and William Westall on 1 January 1802. Whether or not there was an earlier collection is largely immaterial, however, as all collections were incorporated into Brown's collection without attribution, so Brown is treated as the collector in botanical contexts.

Brown initially gave this species the manuscript name "'Cantharifera paludosa' KG III Sound", but this name was not published, and it would not be Brown who published the first description.

The following year, further specimens were collected by Jean Baptiste Leschenault de la Tour, botanist to Nicolas Baudin's expedition. In 1806, Jacques Labillardière used these specimens as the basis of his publication of the species in Novae Hollandiae plantarum specimen. Labillardière did not attribute Leschenault as the collector, and it was long thought that Labillardière had collected the plant himself during his visit to the area in the 1790s; in particular, Brown wrongly acknowledged Labillardière as the discoverer of this plant.

Leschenault's specimen was a fruiting plant, but the fruit was in poor condition, and as a result Labillardière erroneously placed it in the family Rosaceae. This error was not corrected until better fruiting specimens were collected by William Baxter in the 1820s. These were examined by Brown, who concluded that the plant merited its own family, and accordingly erected Cephalotaceae. It has remained in this monogeneric family ever since.

=== Current placement ===
The Australian pitcher plant is an advanced rosid, and thus closer related to apples and oaks than to other pitcher plants like Nepenthaceae (basal core eudicots) and Sarraceniaceae (basal asterids). The placement of its monotypic family Cephalotaceae in the order Saxifragales has been abandoned. It is now placed within the order of Oxalidales where it is most closely related to Brunelliaceae, Cunoniaceae, and Elaeocarpaceae. The monotypic arrangement of the family and genus is indicative of a high degree of endemism, one of four such species of the region.

== Ecology ==
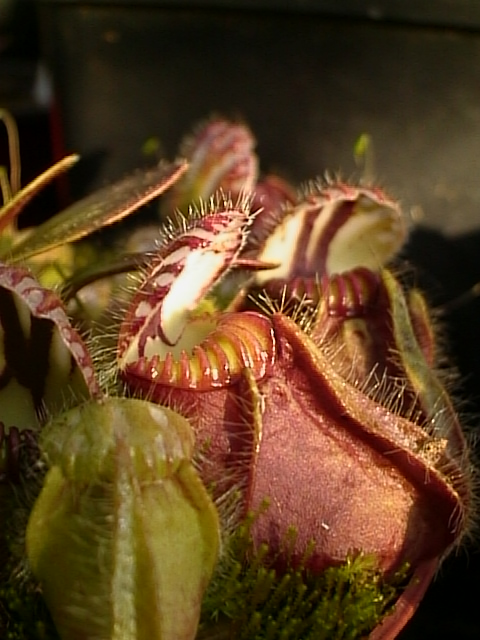
Trap leaf

The plant occurs in southern coastal districts of the Southwest botanical province in Australia; it has been recorded in the Warren, southern Jarrah Forest, and Esperance Plains regions. Its habitat is on moist peaty sands found in swamps or along creeks and streams, but it is tolerant of less damp situations. Its population in the wild has been reduced by habitat destruction and overcollecting; it is therefore classified as vulnerable species (VU A2ac; C2a(i)) by the IUCN. However, this classification is not in unison with Australia's national EPBC Act List of Threatened Species or Western Australia's Wildlife Conservation Act 1950, which both list the species as Not Threatened.

The larvae of Badisis ambulans, an ant-like wingless micropezid fly, develop inside the pitchers. They have never been found anywhere else.

The plants survive occasional bush fires in the undergrowth by sprouting again from the rhizome. However, the seeds are not pyrophytes.

=== Carnivore ===
After the pitcher is formed, the lid lifts from the peristome and the pitcher is ready to catch. Digestive fluid is already in the pitcher. The prey is attracted by nectar secretions on the bottom of the pitcher lid and between the grooves of the pitcher rim. This causes the prey to fall in and drown. The liquid contains enzymes that break down the nutrients, including esterases, phosphatases and proteases. In the majority of cases, ants are caught.

=== Traps as biotopes ===
As with all other carnivorous plant species with sliding traps, the trap fluid is also a biotope for other organisms. A study published in 1985 counted 166 different species, including 82% protozoa, 4% oligochaeta and nematodes, 4% arthropods (copepods, diptera and mites), 2% rotifers, 1% tardigrades and 7% others (bacteria, fungi, algae). Bacteria and fungi in particular also secrete digestive enzymes and thus support the plant's digestive process. It is particularly noticeable that the traps are the "nursery" of two species of diptera. In addition to the larvae of a Dasyhelea species, the larvae of the micropezidae Badisis ambulans also live in the cans.

== Distribution and Endangerment ==
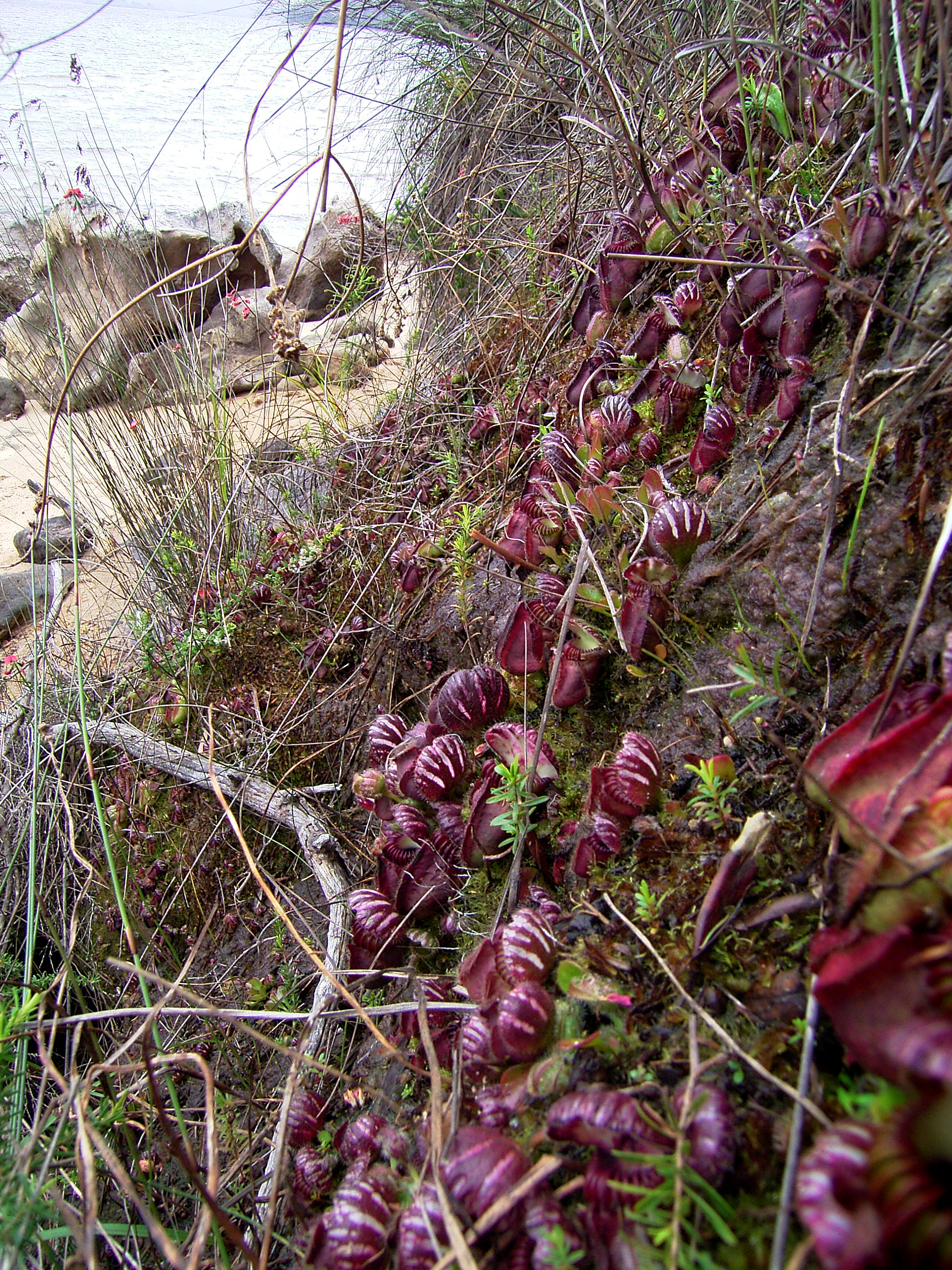
Australian pitcher plant in situ

The plant is endemic to the southwest of Australia, in the coastal area northeast of Albany in a zone of around 400 kilometres (250 mi) between Augusta and Cape Riche. It is mainly found in cushions of sphagnum on consistently moist but well-drained, acidic peat soils over granite, in seeping areas, along riverbanks or under so-called tussocks, grasses that grow in clumps (z. B. from Restionaceae).

The Australian pitcher plant is categorised as Vulnerable by the IUCN due to its restricted distribution. However, there is no acute threat. Because parts of its distribution area are protected and the plants are common within this, they have been removed from CITES-Appendix II.

== Uses ==
The Australian pitcher plant is popular with enthusiasts of carnivorous plants and cultivated worldwide – however, its cultivation is considered challenging.

=== Cultivation ===
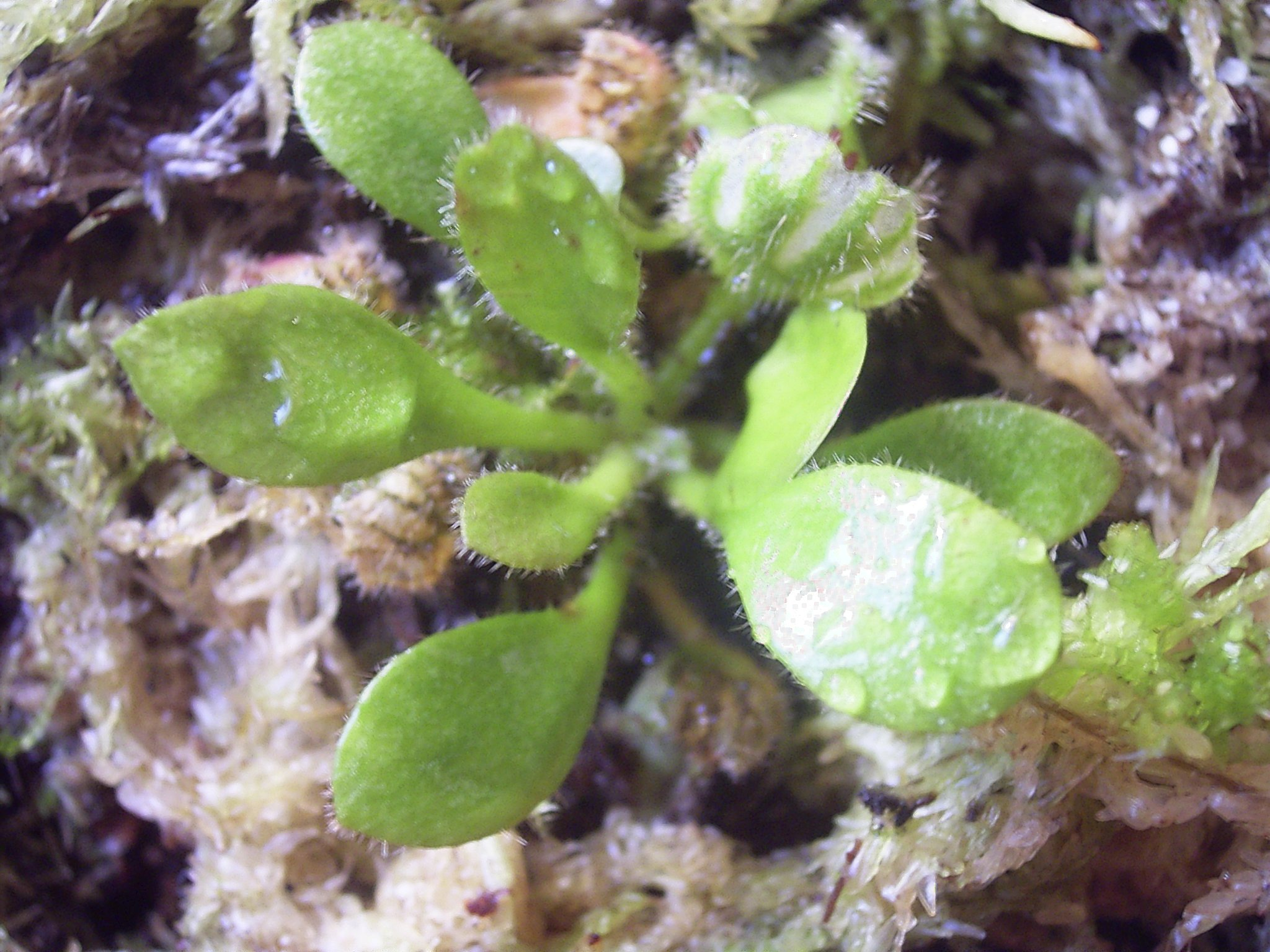
Cephalotus follicularis: a young plant of about 2–3 years, grown in cultivation

Cephalotus are cultivated worldwide. In the wild, they prefer warm day-time temperatures of up to 25 degrees Celsius during the growing season, coupled with cool night-time temperatures. It is commonly grown in a mixture of sphagnum peat moss, perlite, and sand, a reasonable humidity (60–80%) is also preferred. It is successfully propagated from root and leaf cuttings, usually non-carnivorous leaves although pitchers can also be used. A dormancy period is probably crucial to long-term health of the plant.

The plants become colourful and grow vigorously when kept in direct sunlight, while plants cultivated in bright shade remain green.

Living plants were delivered to Kew Gardens by Phillip Parker King in 1823. A specimen flowered in 1827 and provided one source for an illustration in Curtis's Botanical Magazine.

This plant is a recipient of the Royal Horticultural Society's Award of Garden Merit.

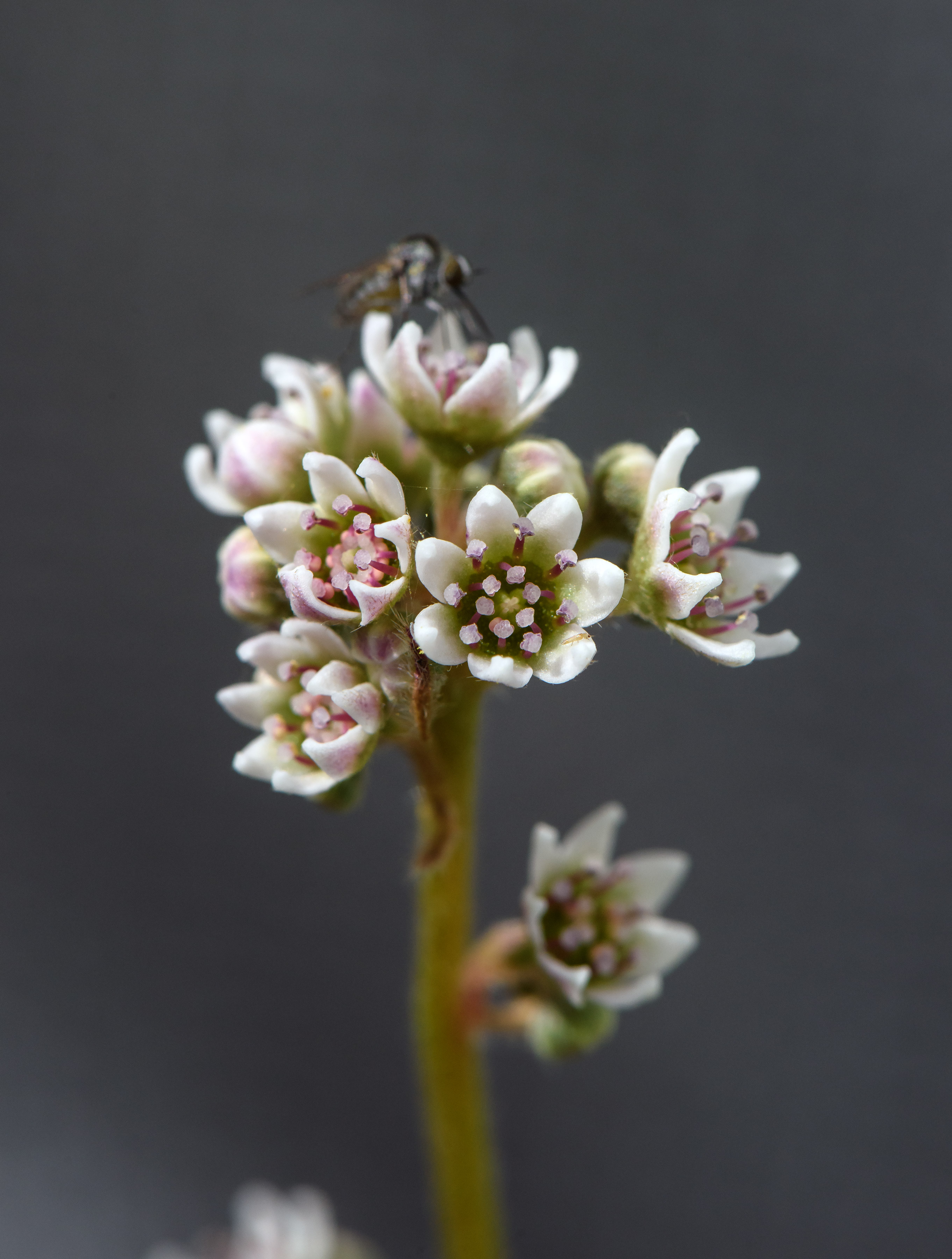
Inflorescence of Cephalotus follicularis in cultivation.

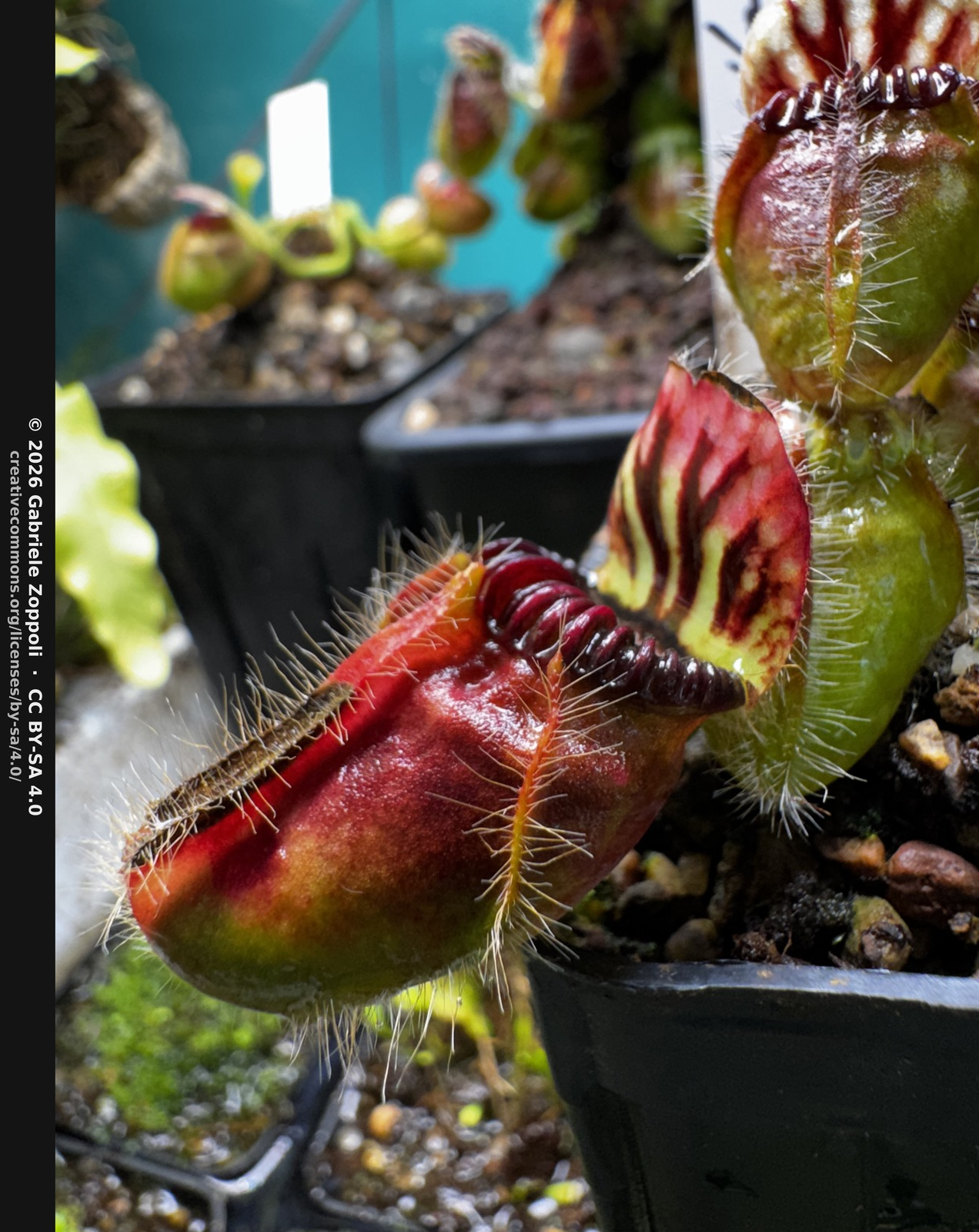
Cephalotus follicularis 'Eden Black', a cultivar selected for its unusually dark-coloured pitchers.

There are several dozen Cephalotus clones that exist in cultivation; nine have been officially registered as cultivars. One of the most well-known is 'Eden Black', a cultivar with unusually dark-coloured pitchers.

== Genomics ==
The genome of the pitcher plant Cephalotus follicularis has been sequenced. Its carnivorous and non-carnivorous leaves have been compared to identify genetic differences associated with key features relating to the attraction of prey and their capture, digestion and nutrient absorption. Results support the independent convergent evolution of Cephalotus and other carnivorous plant lineages. but also suggest that different lineages co-opted similar genes in developing digestive functions. This implies that the ways in which carnivory can be developed are limited.

== Botanical History ==
The Australian pitcher plant was possibly already discovered in 1791 on the expedition by the botanist Archibald Menzies. The plant was first described in 1806 by Jacques Julien Houtton de La Billardière. In 1800 Robert Brown had already observed the species while catching insects. Since 1823 specimens of the plant have been cultivated in the botanic garden Kew Gardens. In 1829 Dumortier categorised the species in its own monotypic family, which is still valid today.

Due to the form of the anther La Billardière uses the Greek term kefalotus ("to have a head") for the genus. Follicularis derives from follicus, meaning "small sack", and refers to the form of the jars. The Australian pitcher plant is also called Albany Pitcher Plant or Western Australian Pitcher Plant.

== See also ==
- Carnivorous plants of Australia
