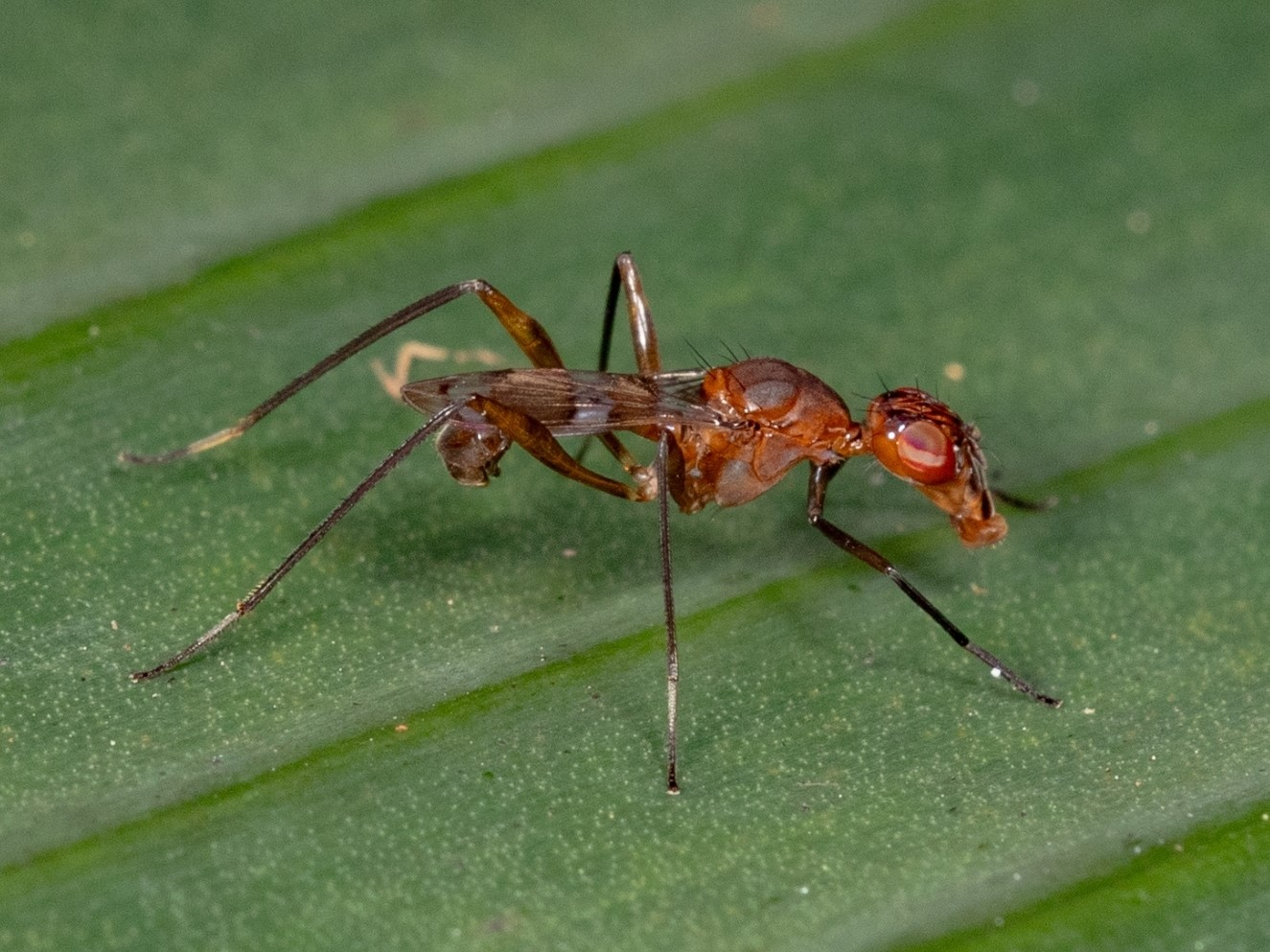
- Cardiacephala arthritica

Scientific classification
- Missing taxonomy template (fix): Cardiacephala
- Several, including: Cardiacephala guttata (Walker, 1853); Cardiacephala secunda Hennig, 1935

= Cardiacephala =

Genus of flies

Cardiacephala is a genus of flies in the family Micropezidae.

== Names brought to synonymy ==
Cardiacephala elegans is a synonym for Plocoscelus podagricus.
