= Calobatella =

Scientific classification
- Domain: Eukaryota
- Kingdom: Animalia
- Phylum: Arthropoda
- Class: Insecta
- Order: Diptera
- Family: Micropezidae
- Subfamily: Calobatinae
- Genus: Calobatella; Mik, 1898

Genus of insects

Calobatella is a genus of flies belonging to the family Micropezidae.

The species of this genus are found in Europe.

Species:

- Calobatella longiceps (Loew, 1870)
- Calobatella mammillata (Loew, 1854)
- Calobatella nigrolamellata (Becker, 1907)
- Calobatella petronella (Linnaeus, 1758)
- Calobatella rufithorax (Hennig, 1938)
- Calobatella uchidana (Hennig, 1938)
