= Anaeropsis =

Scientific classification
- Kingdom: Animalia
- Phylum: Arthropoda
- Class: Insecta
- Order: Diptera
- Superfamily: Nerioidea
- Family: Micropezidae
- Subfamily: Eurybatinae
- Genus: Anaeropsis; Bigot, 1866

Type species
- Anaeropsis lorquini Bigot, 1866

Genus of flies

Anaeropsis is a genus of stilt-legged fly. It is found in New Guinea.

== Species ==
- Anaeropsis guttipennis (Walker, 1861)
