= Southern Indian Ocean Islands tundra =

Ecoregion of several subantarctic islands in the southern Indian Ocean

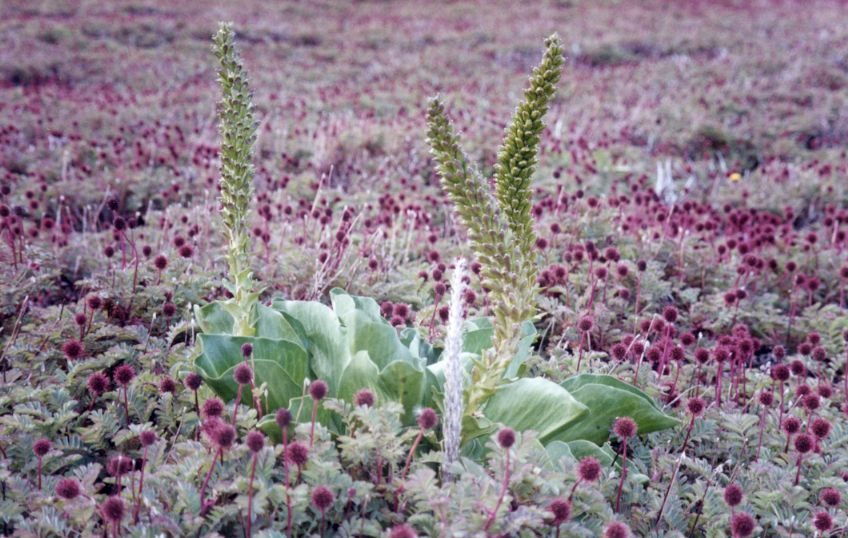
- Kerguelen cabbage (Pringlea antiscorbutica) and Acaena sp. on Kerguelen

- Ecoregion territory (islands inside red-dashed box)

Ecology
- Realm: Antarctic
- Biome: tundra

Geography
- Area: 7,441 km^{2} (2,873 sq mi)
- Countries: Australia; France; South Africa
- Overseas territories: French Southern and Antarctic Lands; Heard Island and McDonald Islands
- Coordinates: 49.25°S 69.17°E

Conservation
- Conservation status: Critical/endangered
- Protected: 0 km^{2} (0%)

The Southern Indian Ocean Islands tundra is a tundra ecoregion that includes several subantarctic islands in the southern Indian Ocean.

== Location and description ==
The ecoregion stretches from Prince Edward Islands in the west, past the Crozet Islands to the Kerguelen Islands 1500 km to the east, and includes the active volcano Heard Island and the nearby McDonald Islands.

== Flora ==
These rocky islands support a variety of plant life, such as tussock grasses, that has adapted to the snowy and icy conditions. There are a number of endemic plant species including Poa cookii grass and the Kerguelen cabbage (Pringlea antiscorbutica), historically a source of vitamin C for sailors, is found on all the islands, not only the Kerguelens. There are also a number of endemic lichens and liverworts.

== Fauna ==
The islands are home to birds and insects such as butterflies, moths, weevils, and spiders as well as wildlife typical of the southern oceans such as penguins, seals and seabirds. This ecoregion is a melting pot where related Antarctic and subantarctic species and subspecies co-exist, for example the following can all be found here: the sooty albatrosses (Phoebetria fusca), light-mantled albatross (Phoebetria palpebrata), northern giant petrel (Macronectes halli), southern giant petrel (Macronectes giganteus), Antarctic fur seal (Arctophoca gazella) and subantarctic fur seal (Arctophoca tropicalis) on Prince Edward, Crozet and Heard Islands.

Vulnerable or endangered birds include three endemics, the duck, Eaton’s pintail (Anas eatoni), the large wandering albatross (Diomedea exulans) and Kerguelen tern (Sterna virgata) as well as a number of albatrosses (the two sooty albatrosses, Indian yellow-nosed albatross (Thalassarche carteri) (the smallest of the mollymawk albatrosses), the large gray-headed albatross (Thalassarche chrysostoma), and black-browed albatross (Thalassarche melanophrys)), three penguins (western rockhopper penguin (Eudyptes chrysocome), macaroni penguin (Eudyptes chrysolophus) and gentoo penguin (Pygoscelis papua) (the one with the white stripe across its head)), and a number of petrels (the two giant petrels, grey petrel (Procellaria cinerea) and white-chinned petrel (Procellaria aequinoctialis)).

Other breeding birds include the land-based black-faced sheathbill and many seabirds brown skua, kelp gull (Larus dominicanus), fulmar prion (Pachyptila crassirostris), Antarctic prion (Pachyptila desolata), slender-billed prion (Pachyptila belcheri), fairy prion (Pachyptila turtur), Antarctic tern (Sterna vittata), Cape petrel (Daption capense), black-bellied storm petrel (Fregetta tropica), grey-backed storm petrel (Garrodia nereis), blue petrel (Halobaena caerulea), Wilson’s storm-petrel (Oceanites oceanicus), common diving petrel (Pelecanoides urinatrix), South Georgian diving-petrel (Pelecanoides georgicus), great-winged petrel, white-headed petrel (Pterodroma lessonii) and soft-plumaged petrel (Pterodroma mollis).

The largest seabird colonies are on the Prince Edward Islands, followed by the Crozet Islands which have breeding colonies of all six species of albatross as well as more than half the world's population of king penguins (Aptenodytes patagonicus).

All six Antarctic seals can be found here, the two fur seals, leopard seal (Hydrurga leptonyx), Weddell seal (Leptonychotes weddellii), southern elephant seal (Mirounga leonina), and crabeater seal (Lobodon carcinophagus)). The fur seals and southern elephant seal breed in the region, and are increasing in numbers now that seal-hunting has stopped, while large numbers of leopard seals winter on the rocks of Heard Island. The colony of southern elephant seals on Heard Island and the Kerguelens is one of the three largest in the world.

== Threats and preservation ==
These isolated islands are relatively unspoilt but their wildlife is not very varied and therefore can be quickly damaged by any human activity and particularly by introduced species of both plants and animals. For example, introduced grasses have taken over areas of some islands, while alien animals including moths, salmon, the mallard duck, rabbits, reindeer, sheep and goats have damaged island ecosystems. Cats and mice are a particular problem as both prey on breeding seabird colonies. Another particular threat is the danger to diving seabirds caught by long-line fishing of the Patagonian toothfish (Dissostichus eleginoides) in the seas around the islands; gray-headed albatross and white-chinned petrel have been especially damaged by this industry as they habitually follow fishing boats.

== See also ==
- Flora and fauna of the Kerguelen Islands
