= Plocoscelus =

Scientific classification
- Kingdom: Animalia
- Phylum: Arthropoda
- Clade: Pancrustacea
- Class: Insecta
- Order: Diptera
- Family: Micropezidae
- Genus: Plocoscelus; Enderlein, 1922

Species
- Several, including: Plocoscelus podagricus

Genus of flies

Plocoscelus is a genus of flies in the family Micropezidae. Species are found in Central and South Americas.
