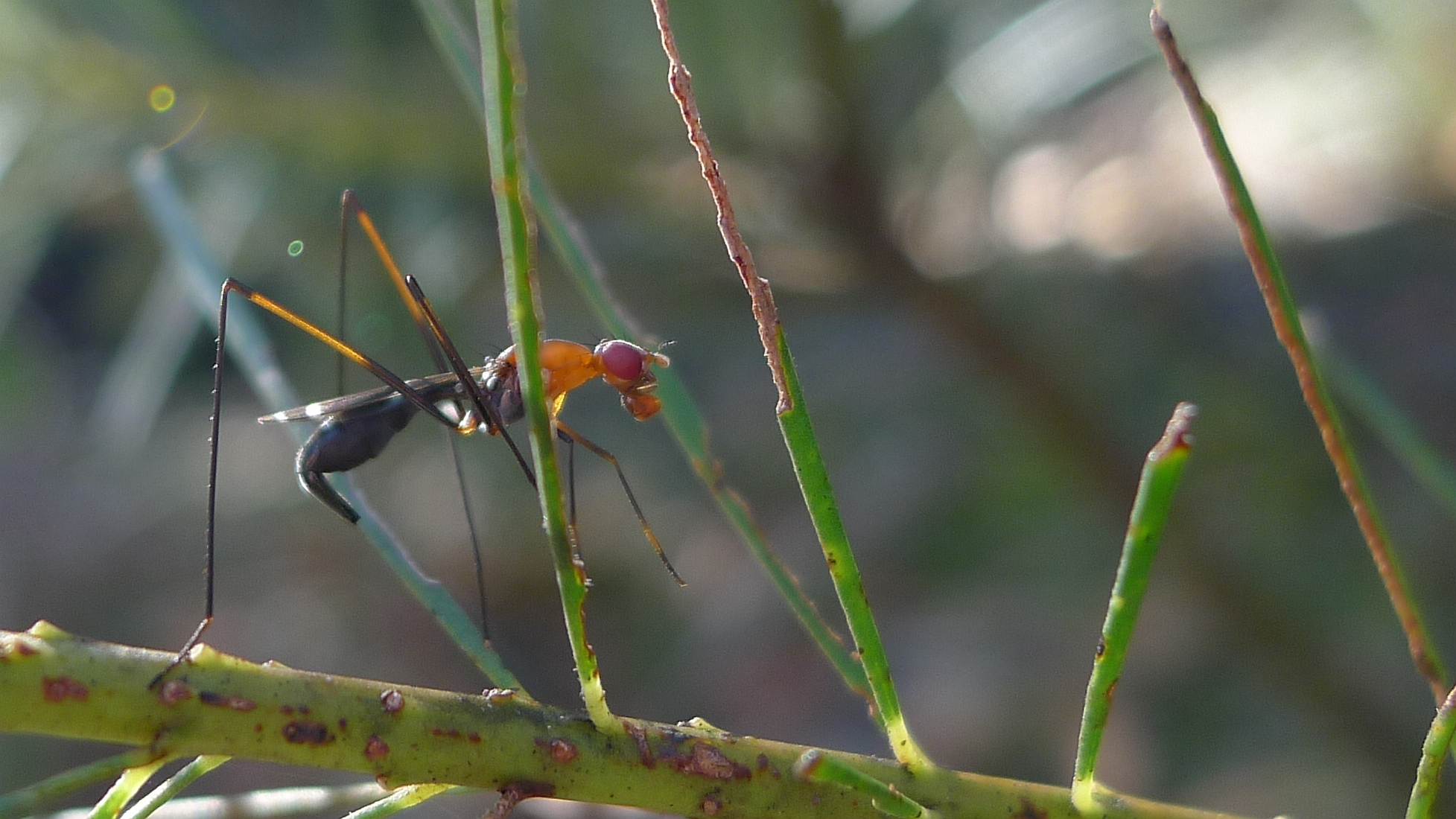
- Stilt Fly, a species of Metopochetus, family Micropezidae. ANSTO Buffer Zone Track, Lucas Heights, NSW Australia, April 2012.

Scientific classification
- Kingdom: Animalia
- Phylum: Arthropoda
- Clade: Pancrustacea
- Class: Insecta
- Order: Diptera
- Family: Micropezidae
- Subfamily: Eurybatinae
- Genus: Metopochetus; Enderlein, 1922

Type species
- Metopochetus ralumensis Enderlein, 1922

= Metopochetus =

Genus of flies

Metopochetus is a genus of stilt-legged flies. Crus is a subgenus. Species within Metopochetus are:

- Metopochetus aequalis
- Metopochetus aitkeni
- Metopochetus aper
- Metopochetus bickeli
- Metopochetus clarus
- Metopochetus corax
- Metopochetus curvus
- Metopochetus freyi
- Metopochetus impar
- Metopochetus lugens
- Metopochetus micidus
- Metopochetus ralumenis
- Metopochetus regius
