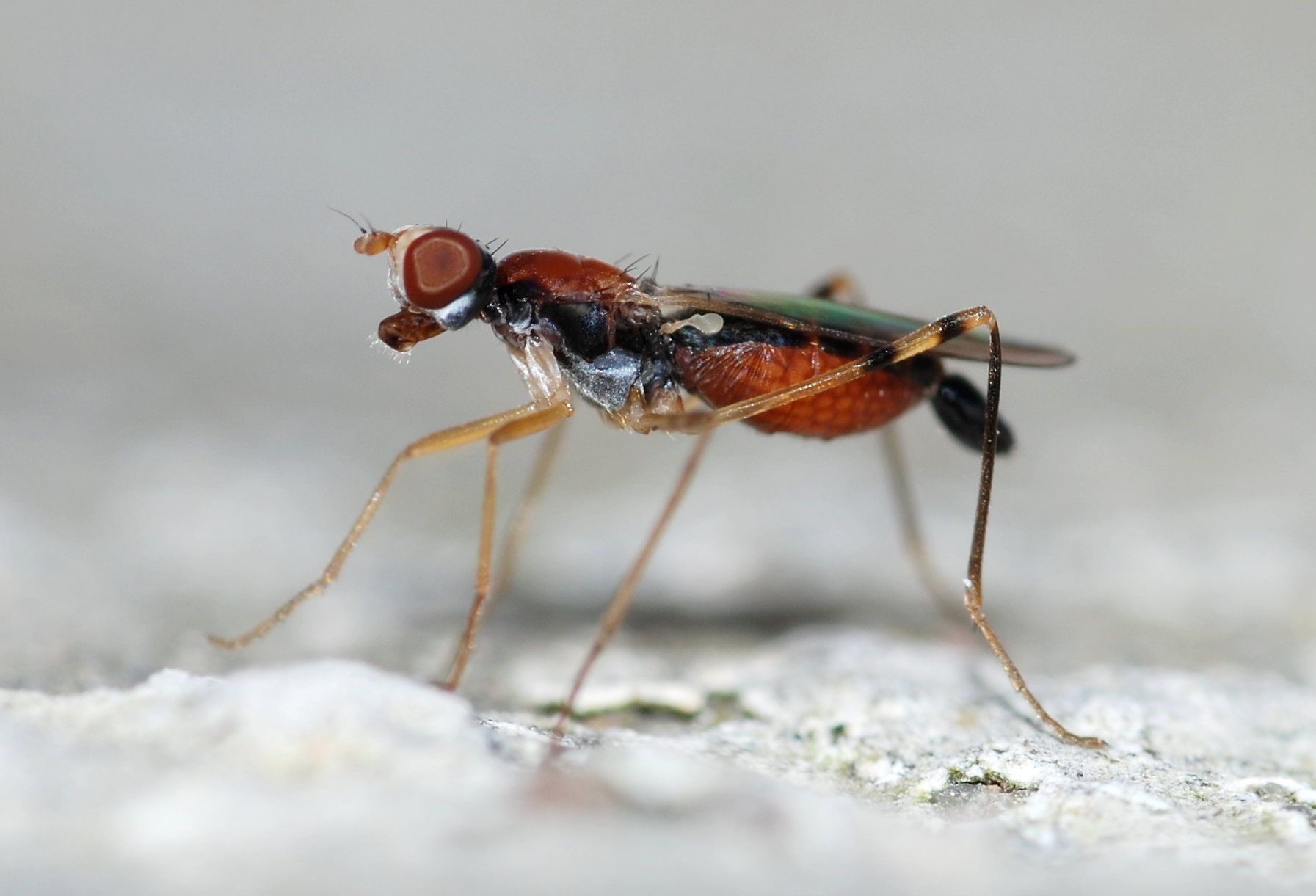
- Neria sp. from Portugal

Scientific classification
- Kingdom: Animalia
- Phylum: Arthropoda
- Clade: Pancrustacea
- Class: Insecta
- Order: Diptera
- Section: Schizophora
- Subsection: Acalyptratae
- Superfamily: Nerioidea
- Family: Micropezidae; Loew, 1861

Type genus
- Micropeza Meigen, 1803

Subfamilies
- Calobatinae; Calycopteryginae; Eurybatinae; Micropezinae; Taeniapterinae

Diversity
- 54 genera, 5 subfamilies

= Micropezidae =

Stilt-legged flies

Family of flies

Metopochetus bicolor

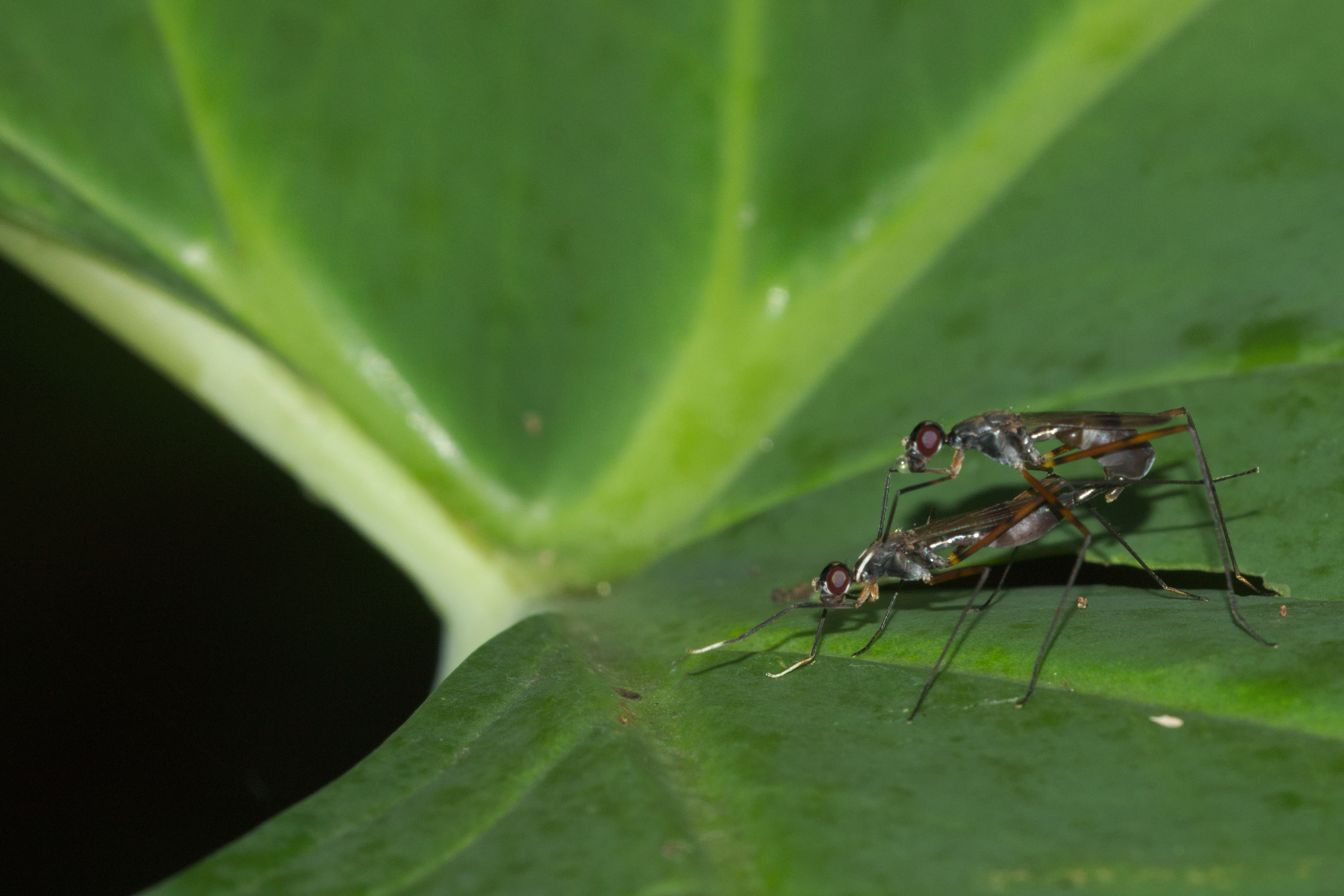
Mating pair

The Micropezidae are a moderate-sized family of acalyptrate muscoid flies in the insect order Diptera, comprising about 500 species in about 50 genera and five subfamilies worldwide, (except New Zealand and Macquarie Island). They are most diverse in tropical and subtropical habitats, especially in the Neotropical Region.

Insects in this family are commonly called stilt-legged flies, after their characteristically long legs. The fore legs are markedly smaller than the other pairs. Mostly, they are long-bodied, often black flies, usually with infuscated (darkened) wings. Wings are reduced in the genera Calycopteryx and entirely absent in the ant-like Badisis ambulans.

== Description ==
For terms see Morphology of Diptera
Very slender, small to large (3–16 mm) flies, they have long, thin legs and narrow wings. The head is small and elongated or rounded. The antennae are small and the arista is bare or pubescent. Ocelli are present, but ocellar bristles are absent. Vibrissae are absent and the postvertical bristles are divergent or absent. Up to three pairs of frontal bristles curve forward or backward. Interfrontal bristles are absent. The wings are clear or have a smoky pattern. The costa is without interruptions. The subcosta is complete, its ending in the costa close to vein R1. The posterior basal wing cell and discoidal wing cell are sometimes fused. Crossvein BM-Cu present or (Micropezinae) absent. The abdomen is long and narrow. The tibiae lack a dorsal preapical bristle.

== Biology ==
Micropeza corrigiolata

Neria cibaria

Some species, much the same as in the strongylophthalmyiid genus, Strongylophthalmyia, mimic ants; others mimic wasps and are especially similar in appearance to some ichneumonid wasps. Species of the genus Anaeropsis have stalked eyes.

Little is known of the larval habits, but they are probably phytophagous or saprophagous in decayed vegetation, old manure, or fungi. Larvae of certain Mimegralla species have been found to live in the roots of ginger and other plants, under the bark of dead trees, or in other decaying material. Species of Micropeza have phytophagous larvae feeding in the root nodules of leguminous plants in open habitats. Species of Rainieria develop in rotting wood and are found in old forests. Adults are either predatory on small insects (for example Calobata in Britain) or are attracted to excrement or decaying fruit. Adults are found on low herbage, flowers, leaves, rotting fruit, and excrement.

Many species (for example those of genus Mimegralla) are known for their habit of standing motionless while waving their prominently marked front legs in front of their heads, a behavior which contributes to their mimicry of wasps. At least one species of Metopochetus (M. curvus) was observed to wave its hind legs instead, though these are not conspicuously colored.

== Identification ==
- Czerny. 1930. Tylidae. In: Lindner, E. (Ed.). Die Fliegen der Paläarktischen Region 5, 42a, 13–16. Keys to Palaearctic species but now needs revision (in German).
- Séguy, E. (1934) Diptères: Brachycères. II. Muscidae acalypterae, Scatophagidae. Paris: Éditions Faune de France 28. virtuelle numérique
- Shtakel'berg, A.A. Family Micropezidae (Tylidae in part) in Bei-Bienko, G. Ya, 1988 Keys to the insects of the European Part of the USSR Volume 5 (Diptera) Part 2 English edition. Keys to Palaearctic species but now needs revision.

== Conservation ==
Calycopteryx mosleyi, found on the Kerguelen Islands and Heard Island, is associated with the Kerguélen cabbage (Pringlea antiscorbutica, Brassicaceae). As this plant is being destroyed by introduced rabbits, the fly is considered vulnerable.

The larvae of Badisis ambulans live in the pitchers of the endangered Albany pitcher plant (Cephalotus follicularis, Cephalotaceae).

== Fossil record ==
Several fossil species have been found in Baltic amber, probably from the Late Eocene (about 36 million years old). However, most were washed onto beaches after wearing from Tertiary strata, making their age uncertain. Two fossil genera are presently recognized, Cypselosomatites Hennig, 1965 and the advanced Electrobata Hennig, 1965 which may be more than one genus however.

== Genera ==
This list is compiled from the BioSystematic Database of World Diptera and probably complete as of January 2007.

- Anaeropsis Bigot, 1866
- Badisis McAlpine, 1990
- Calobata Meigen, 1803
- Calobatella Mik, 1898
- Calobatina Enderlein, 1922
- Calosphen Hennig, 1934
- Calycopteryx Eaton, 1875
- Cardiacephala Macquart, 1843
- Cephalosphen Hennig, 1934
- Chaetotylus Hendel, 1932
- Cliobata Enderlein, 1923
- Cnodacophora Czerny, 1930
- Compsobata Czerny, 1930
- Cothornobata Czerny, 1932
- Courtoisia Barraclough, 1993
- Crepidochetus Enderlein, 1922
- Crosa Steyskal, 1952
- Cryogonus Cresson, 1926
- Ectemnodera Enderlein, 1922
- Electrobata Hennig, 1965
- Erythromyiella Hennig, 1935
- Eurybata Osten Sacken, 1882
- Globomyia Hennig, 1935
- Globopeza Marshall, 2005
- Glyphodera Enderlein, 1922
- Grallipeza Rondani, 1850
- Grammicomyia Bigot, 1859
- Hemichaeta Hennig, 1934
- Hoplocheiloma Cresson, 1926
- Mesoconius Enderlein, 1922
- Metasphen Frey, 1927
- Metopochetus Enderlein, 1922
- Micropeza Meigen, 1803
- Mimegralla Rondani, 1850
- Mimomyrmecia Frey, 1927
- Neograllomyia Hendel, 1933
- Neria Robineau-Desvoidy, 1830
- Nestima Osten Sacken, 1881
- Notenthes Marshall, 2002
- Papeza McAlpine, 1975
- Paramimegralla Hennig, 1937
- Parasphen Enderlein, 1922
- Plocoscelus Enderlein, 1922
- Poecilotylus Hennig, 1934
- Pseudeurybata Hennig, 1934
- Ptilosphen Enderlein, 1922
- Rainieria Rondani, 1843
- Scipopus Enderlein, 1922
- Steyskalia Aczel, 1959
- Stiltissima Barraclough, 1991
- Taeniaptera Macquart, 1835
- Tenthes Cresson, 1930
- Trepidarioides Frey, 1927
- Zelatractodes Enderlein, 1922
