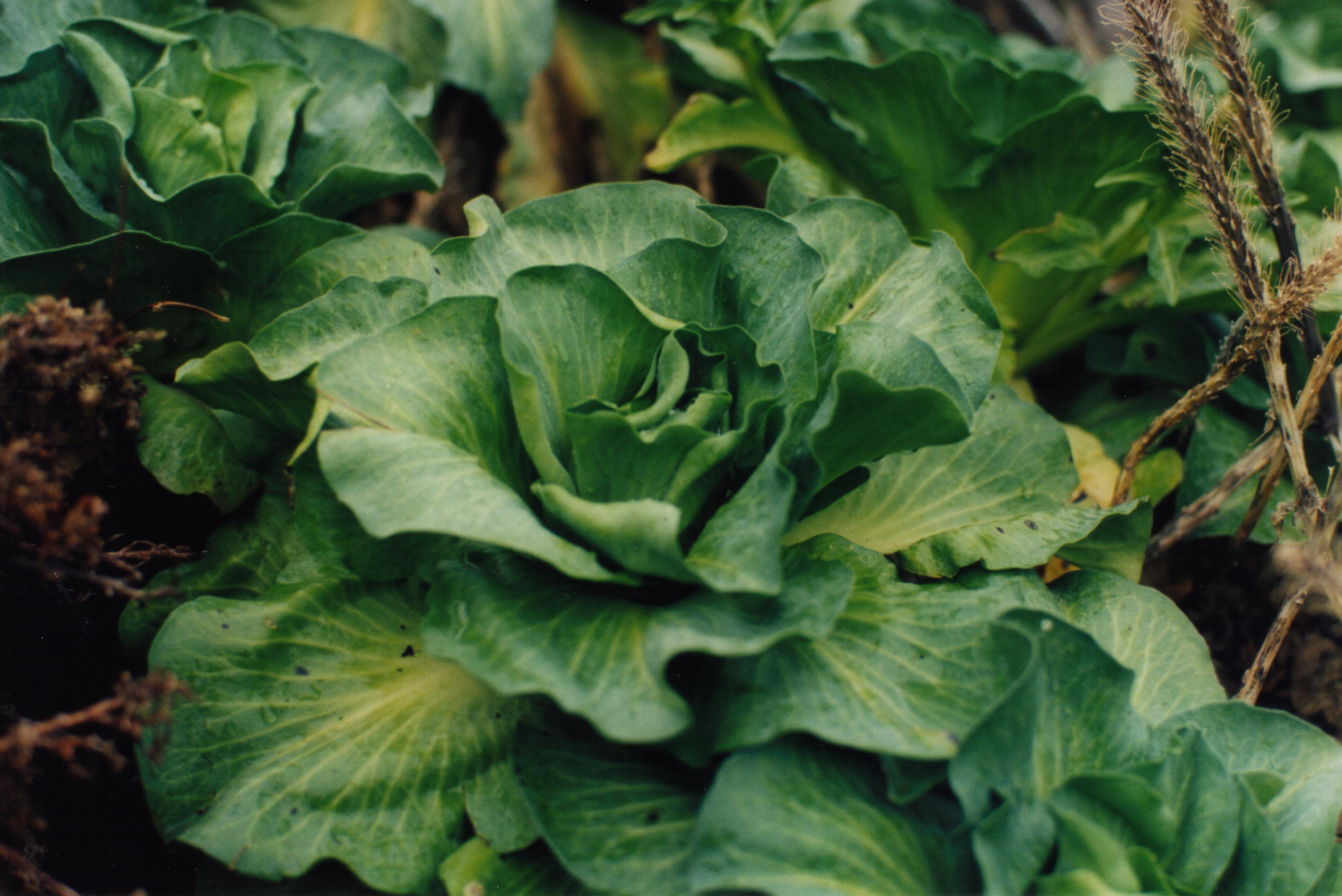

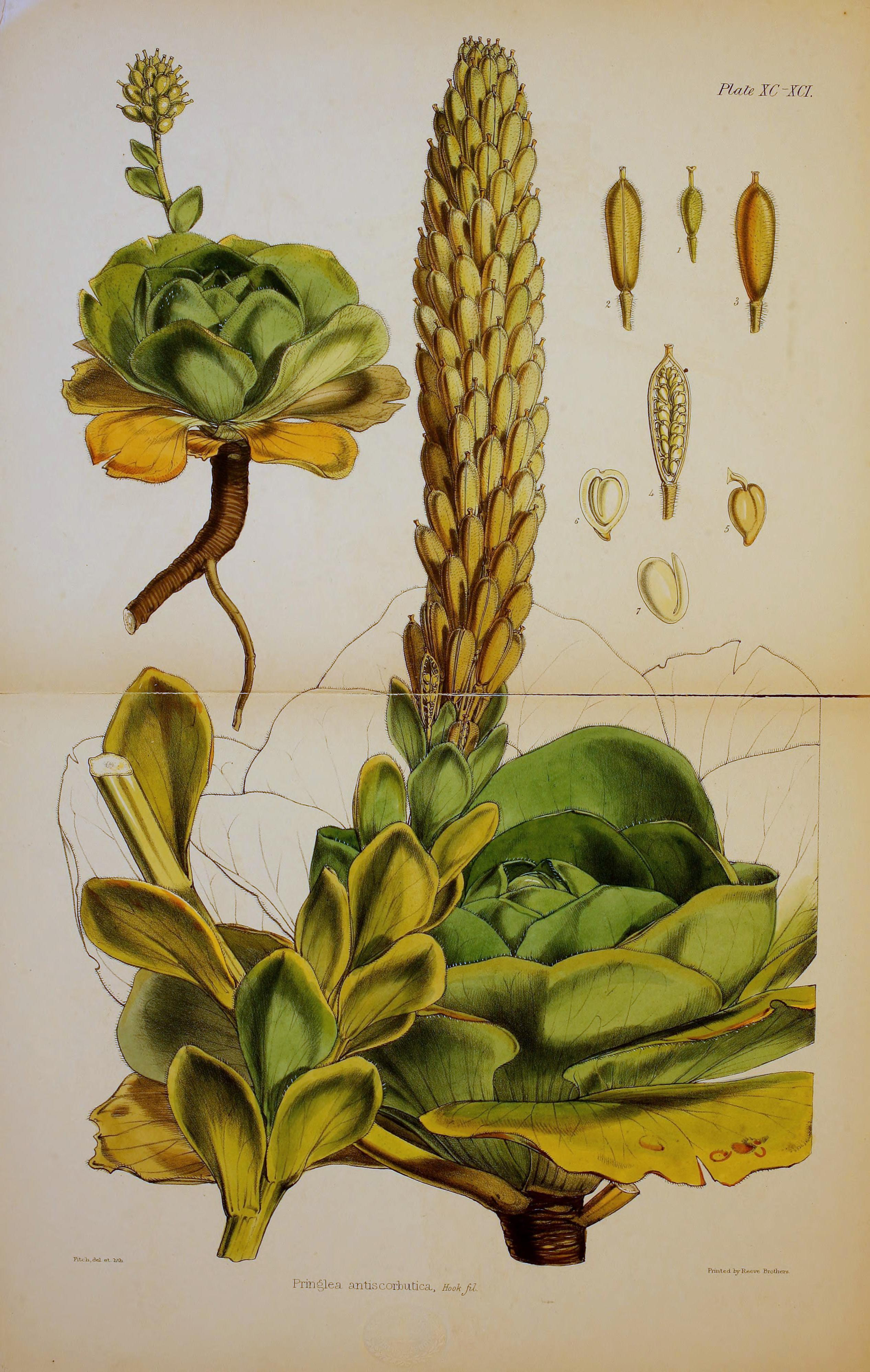

Scientific classification
- Kingdom: Plantae
- Clade: Tracheophytes
- Clade: Angiosperms
- Clade: Eudicots
- Clade: Rosids
- Order: Brassicales
- Family: Brassicaceae
- Genus: Pringlea; T.Anderson ex Hook.f.
- Species: P. antiscorbutica

Binomial name
- Pringlea antiscorbutica R.Br. ex Hook.f.

= Pringlea =

Kerguelen cabbage

Species of flowering plant in the cabbage family

Pringlea antiscorbutica, commonly known as Kerguelen cabbage, is a flowering plant and the sole member of the monotypic genus Pringlea in the family Brassicaceae. Its common name comes from the archipelago of its discovery, the Kerguelen Islands, and its generic name derives from Sir John Pringle, president of the Royal Society at the time of its discovery by Captain James Cook's Surgeon, William Anderson in 1776.

Despite its appearance and edibility, it is not related to the common broadleaf plantain.

== Description ==
Pringlea antiscorbutica has leaf rosettes of up to 45 cm (18 in) in diameter, that sit on top of perennial half woody stems of about 15 cm (6 in) thick and up to 1 m (3 ft 3 in) long. The erect flowering stems remain on the plants for many years.

== Distribution ==
Pringlea antiscorbutica grows on the remote Heard Island and McDonald Islands, Crozet, Prince Edward and Kerguelen Islands. The ancestor of P. antiscorbutica probably migrated from South America some five million years ago.

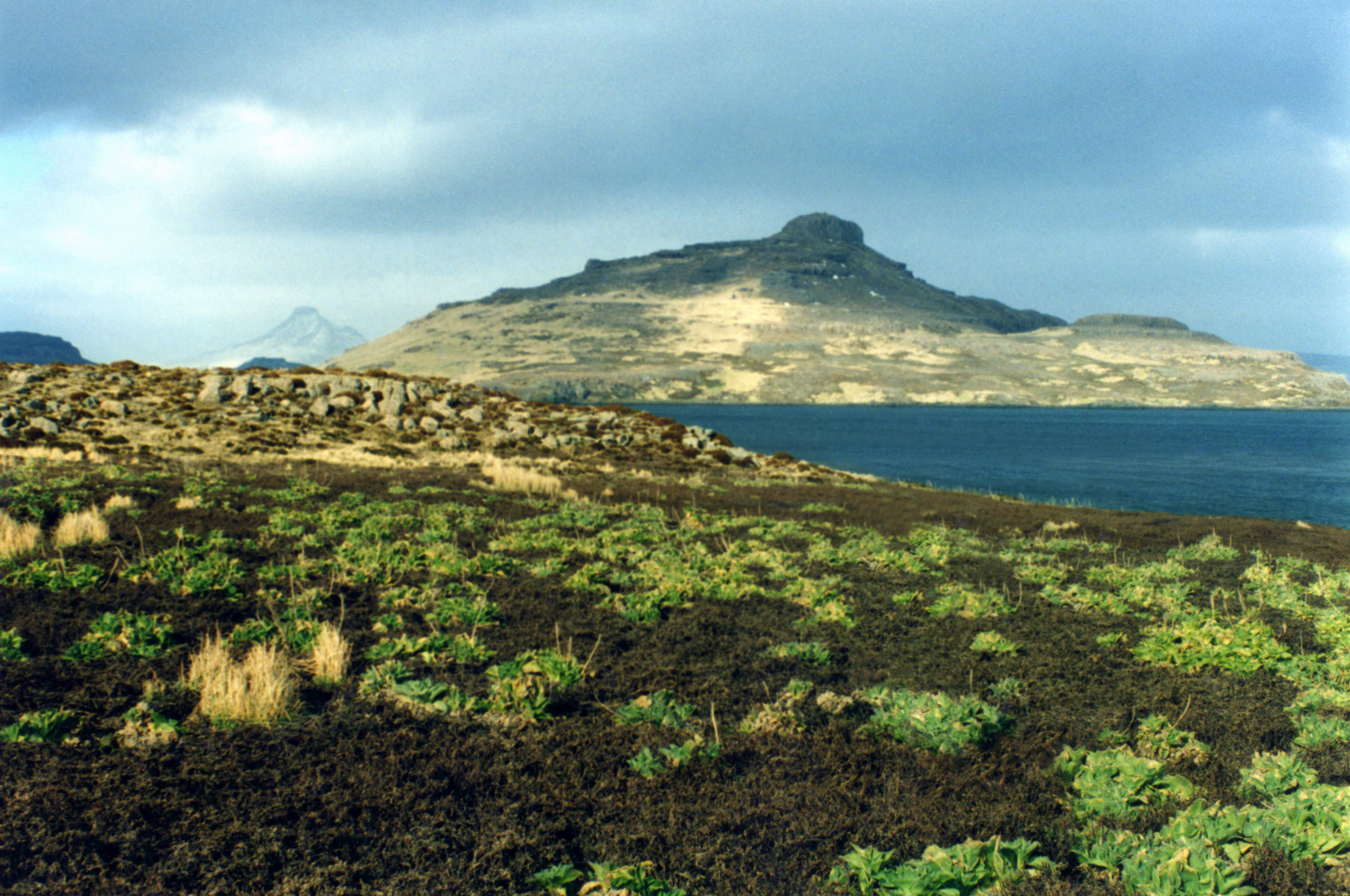
Kerguelen cabbages on Mayes island (Kerguelen Islands)

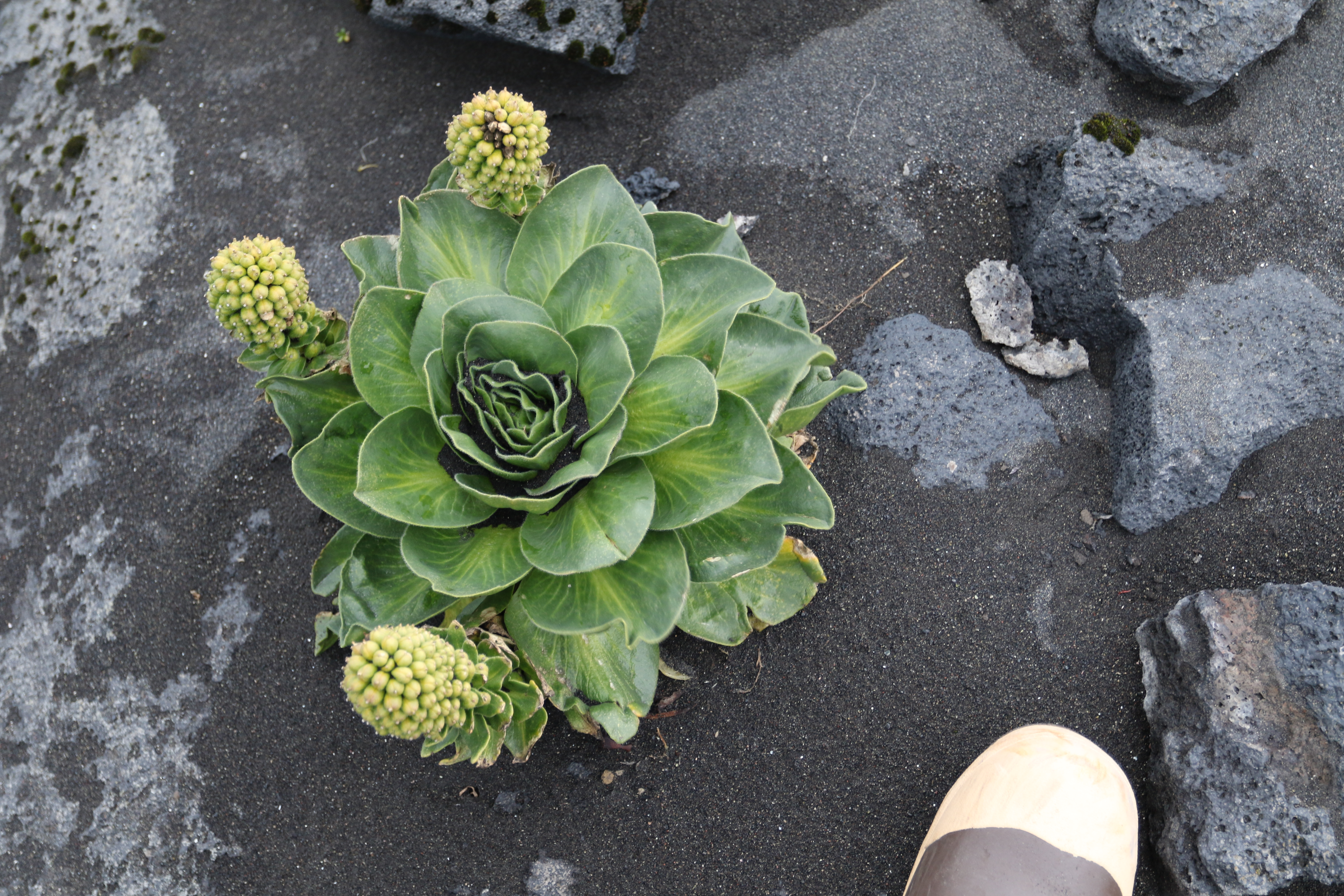

== Ecology ==
The home islands of Pringlea antiscorbutica are at roughly 50° south latitude and constantly buffeted by strong winds, making the islands unfavorable for wind pollination, except on infrequent mild days. This climate, plus the absence of potential insect pollinators, means the species can survive only through a process of self-pollination.

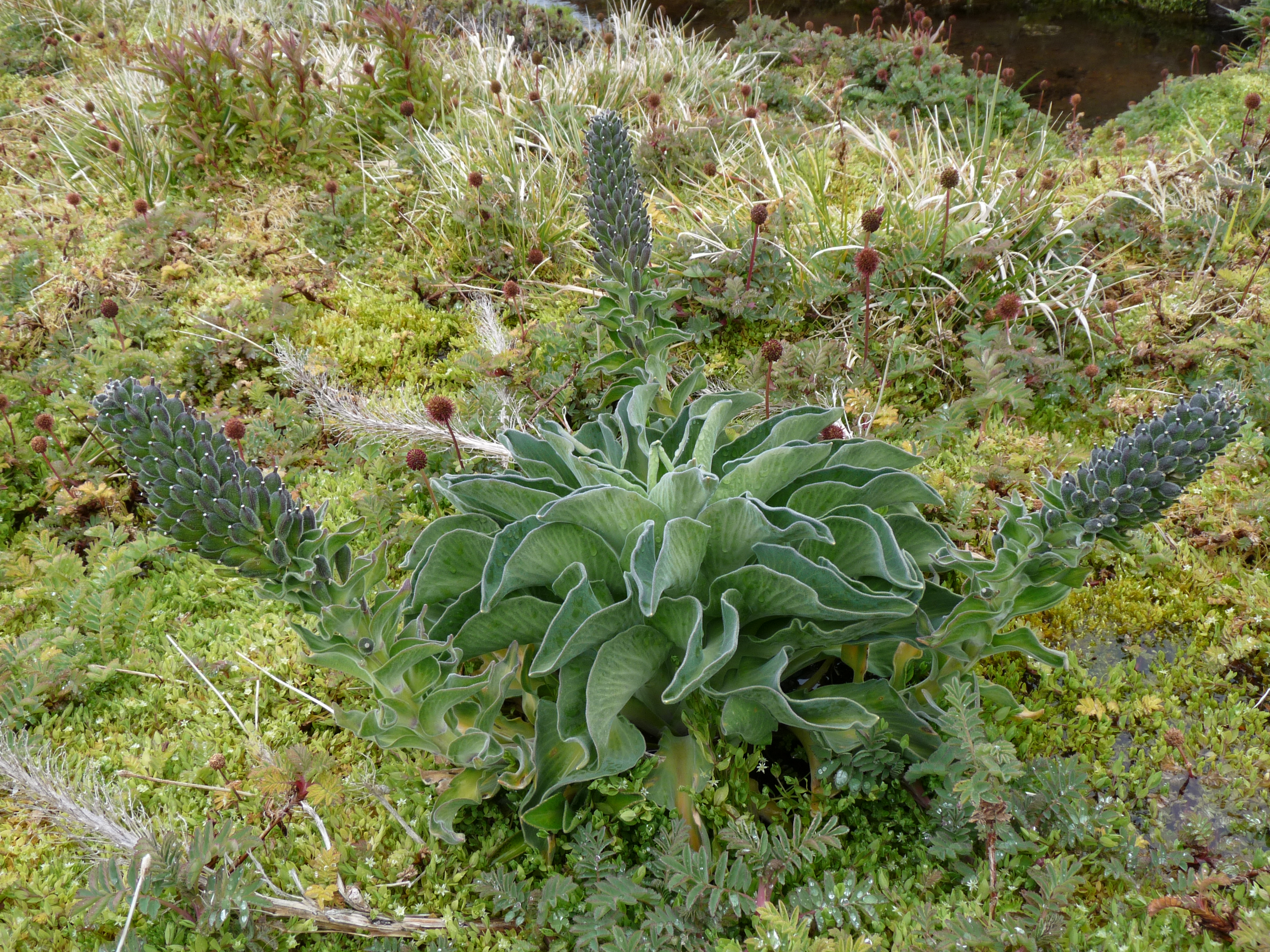

The plants grow to a diameter of about 50 cm in around four years, and flower for the first time in their third or fourth year. At the mature stage, this species exhibits several adaptations linked to cold tolerance such as high polyamine levels. Pringlea has a very high leaf water content (above 83%) and the waterflow from the root to the leaves is very easy, which is no problem since soil water content on the distribution area of Kerguelen cabbage is permanently high. This implies that successfully growing this species elsewhere is difficult.

== Uses ==
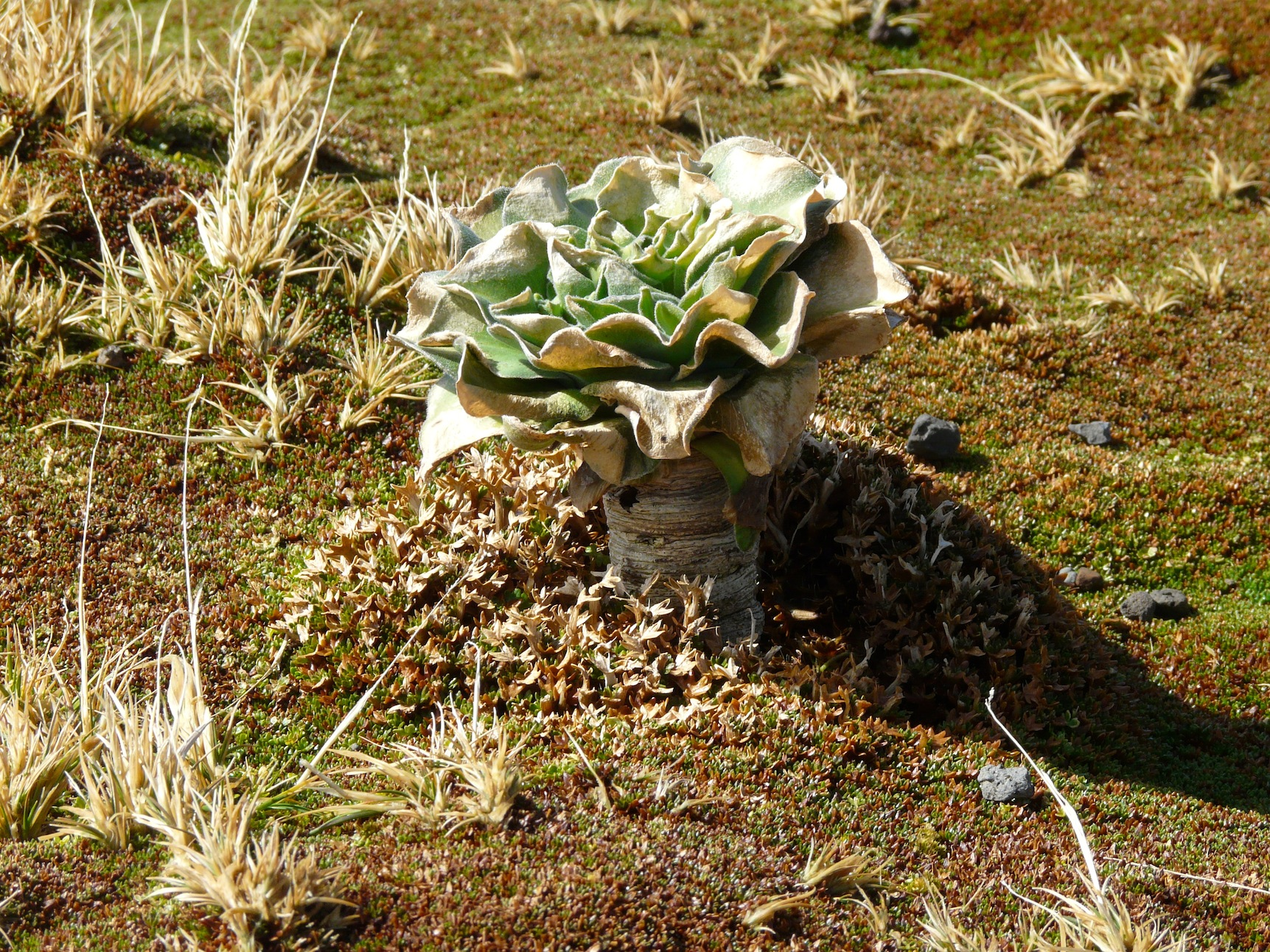
Kerguelen cabbage, showing the stalk

Pringlea antiscorbutica is edible, containing high levels of potassium. Its leaves contain an oil rich in vitamin C, a fact which, in the days of sailing ships, made it very attractive to sailors suffering from scurvy, hence the specific epithet antiscorbutica, which means "against scurvy" in Low Latin. It was essential to the diets of the whalers on Kerguelen when pork, beef, or seal meat was used up. In May 1840, botanist Joseph Dalton Hooker was the first to make a technical analysis of the plant, and to assign the Latin name.

Hooker also reported having eaten some soup that had been made with Kerguelen cabbage, and described the raw leaves as tasting like cress, the boiled leaves as tasting like "stale" cabbage, and the root as tasting like horseradish.

== Conservation ==
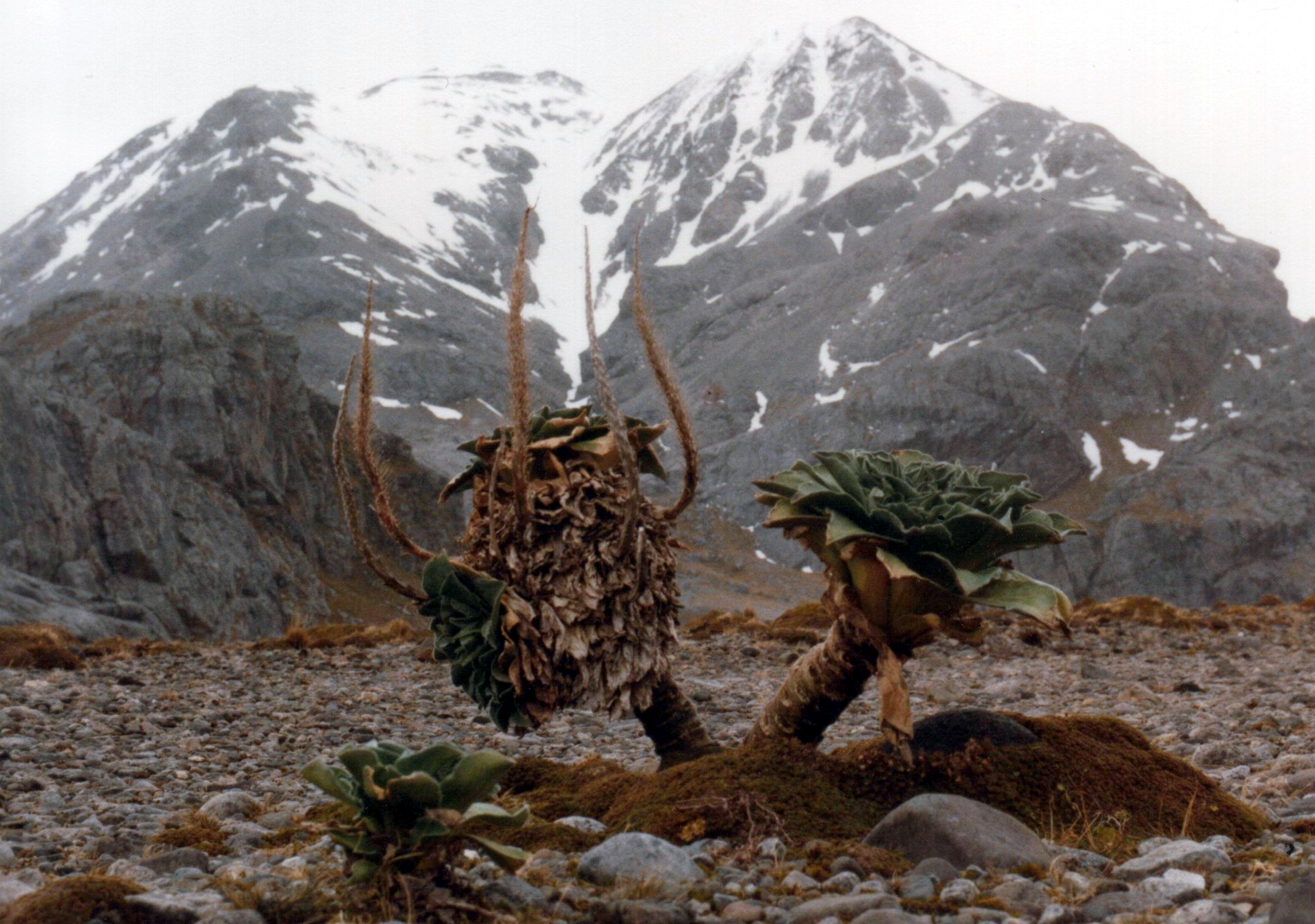
An old Kerguelen cabbage on the Péninsule Rallier du Baty, Kerguelen Island

The micropezid fly species Calycopteryx mosleyi is associated with this plant. Rabbits which were introduced on the Kerguelen around 1874, feed on the cabbage, and the plant is now limited to locations that cannot be accessed by them. Fortunately, rabbits are not present on all islands.

== See also ==
- Azorella polaris - Also known as Macquarie Island cabbage, another subarctic cabbage-like plant.
