= Sheep wagon =

Mobile home for sheepherders in the US west

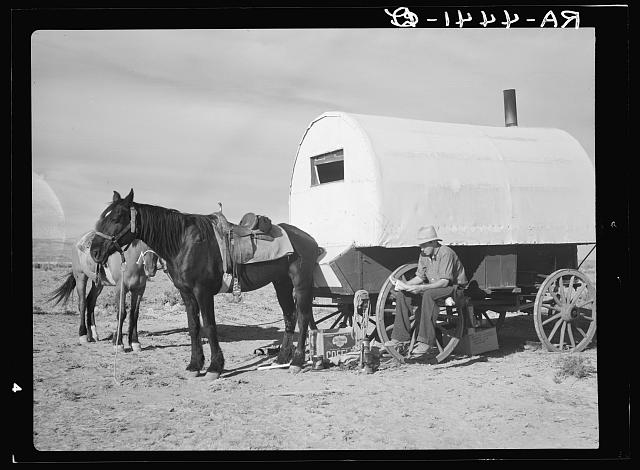
Sheep wagon. Natrona County, Wyoming, 1936

Sheep wagon is a type of mobile dwelling used by sheepherders in the Intermountain West of the United States. It was designed to provide living quarters for a herder accompanying a flock of sheep on the open range. A typical sheep wagon incorporated a bed, a cast-iron wood stove, storage, and a work space into a compact wagon body. The type became particularly associated with Wyoming, where it was widely used during the expansion of the state's sheep industry in the late 19th and early 20th centuries.

Sheep wagons were a response to the requirements of open-range sheep husbandry. Unlike cattle, sheep required close supervision and protection from predators, storms, disease, and other hazards. A herder therefore accompanied the flock as it moved between grazing areas. Tents were initially used as mobile shelters, but during the 1880s and 1890s the sheep wagon became common on the range

== History ==
=== Development in Wyoming ===
Sheep were introduced into Wyoming in the late 1860s, and the state's sheep industry expanded rapidly during the following decades. Because sheep could not simply be released on the open range without supervision, herders followed the flocks as they moved in response to available forage. The distances involved made a fixed cabin impractical, while an ordinary emigrant wagon did not provide suitable long-term accommodation. Mobile sheep camps therefore developed as an integral part of the range-sheep system.

The earliest mobile camps consisted principally of tents and improvised wagons. During the 1880s and 1890s, purpose-built sheep wagons came into common use in Wyoming. The Wyoming State Historic Preservation Office describes the sheep wagon as a covered wagon equipped with a bed, table, storage for cooking supplies, and often a stove.

The origin of the specialized sheep wagon is disputed. James Candlish, a blacksmith in Rawlins, Wyoming, is commonly credited with building the first "authentic" sheep wagon in 1884, reportedly from an idea supplied by sheepman George Ferris. This attribution appears in later Wyoming historical accounts and in National Register documentation. Other accounts, however, attribute the development of the early sheep wagon to blacksmiths elsewhere in Wyoming, including Kemmerer and the Cokeville area. The University of Wyoming's American Heritage Center consequently describes the origin as debatable.

Candlish's Rawlins association nevertheless became an important part of the historical tradition surrounding the sheep wagon. According to Agnes Wright Spring, approximately eighteen years after the first Candlish wagon was put into use, the Schulte Hardware Company of Casper, Wyoming, employed Marshall Buxton to manufacture sheep wagons. The wagons used special "mountain gear" manufactured by the Bayne Wagon Company of Kenosha, Wisconsin.

=== Early documentation ===
Sheep wagons were established features of the western sheep industry by the early 20th century. Will C. Barnes's Western Grazing Grounds and Forest Ranges, first published in 1913, included an illustration captioned "A Sheep Wagon or Camp on Wheels in Wyoming" and a separate illustration of an Arizona sheep wagon.

An official publication describing Wyoming's resources likewise recorded the use of sheep wagons. It stated that sheepmen could move with their flocks and, during winter, live in a sheep wagon equipped with a spring bed, stove, and kitchen equipment.

By the early 20th century, commercial manufacture had developed alongside local blacksmith construction. Companies including Schulte Hardware of Casper and manufacturers outside Wyoming produced sheep wagons for ranchers. Wealthier sheep operators could order wagons from established wagon manufacturers, while local builders continued to construct and repair them.

== Design ==
The traditional sheep wagon was essentially a small house mounted on a wagon chassis. Its design was intended to make maximum use of a very limited interior space while remaining sufficiently light and durable to be moved across unimproved range country.

A typical Wyoming sheep wagon was approximately 12 feet (3.7 m) long and about 6.5 feet (2.0 m) wide or high, depending on the particular design and measurement used. The University of Wyoming's American Heritage Center describes a typical wagon as 12 feet long and 6.5 feet high.

The traditional wagon had a wooden body and a curved canvas roof supported by wooden bows. Blanket material or other insulation was placed within the structure. A built-in bed extended across the rear of the wagon. Beneath or near the bed was storage and a table that could be pulled out or otherwise folded into the living area. A small wood- or coal-burning stove, generally fitted with an oven, provided both heat and cooking facilities. A kerosene lantern provided light.

The wagon also incorporated storage designed specifically for life on the range. Food, cooking utensils, clothing, tools, and other necessities were stored in cupboards, boxes, drawers, and compartments. Exterior "grub boxes" could be mounted between the front and rear wheels.

The result was a compact dwelling that served simultaneously as bedroom, kitchen, storage room, and shelter. The design allowed a solitary herder to remain with a flock for extended periods without access to a permanent building.

== Use on the range ==
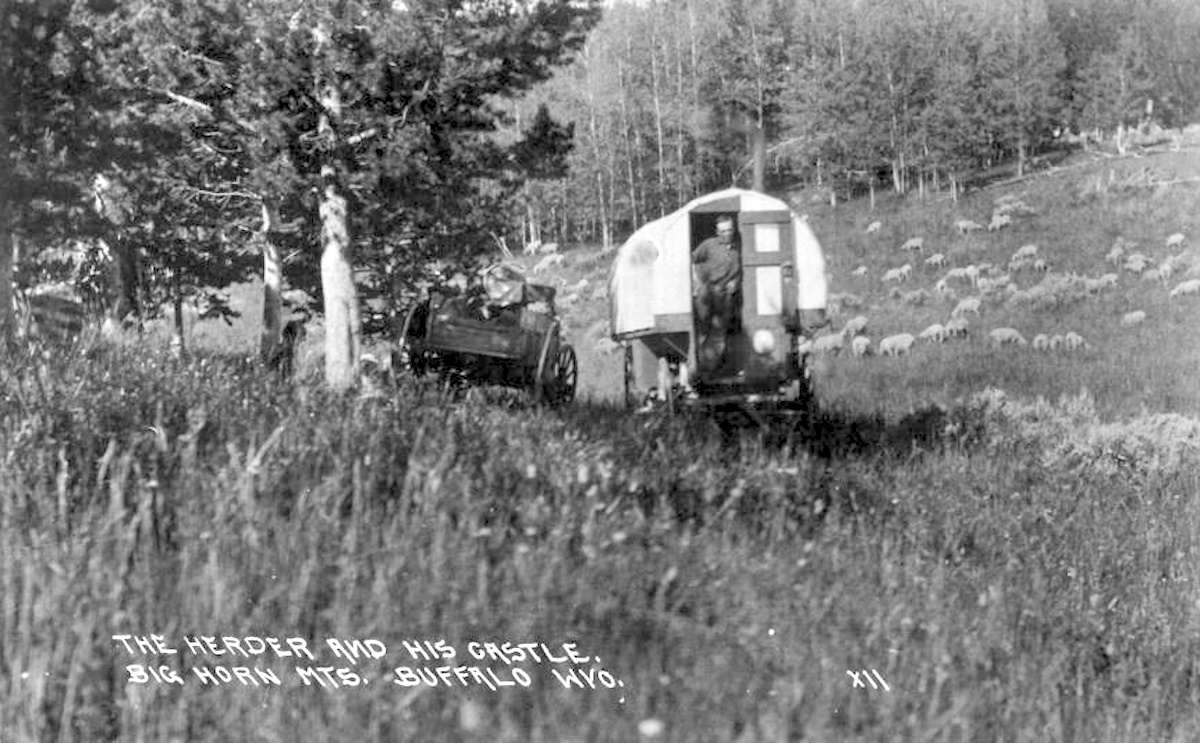
Sheepherder up in the Big Horns, 1917. Possibly part of the Healy Brothers sheep company, which was prominent in the region at that time.

A sheep wagon formed the living quarters of a herder in a mobile sheep camp. The wagon could be moved when the flock moved to new grazing grounds. A camp tender using a team of horses could supply the wagon with food and other necessities and transport hay for the herder's horses.

The wagon was and is, therefore, part of a larger system of mobile sheep ranching. Especially as long distance intermountain sheep trailing declined in the early 20th century, Wyoming sheep operations commonly began to move flocks between winter and summer ranges within the state. The distances can still be quite far, sometimes 100 miles or more. Individual herders also move their bands daily or as needed so that the sheep do not overgraze a particular area and could obtain adequate food and water.

The sheep wagon was generally used where the terrain permitted a wagon to reach the sheep camp. At higher elevations and in other areas inaccessible to wagons, tents continued to be used as mobile shelters.

The isolated life of the herder was a characteristic feature. A single herder might be responsible for a large band of sheep, living in the wagon for weeks or months while tending the flock. The sheep wagon consequently became closely associated with the occupational and cultural history of Western sheepherding.

== Manufacturing and later development ==
During the early 20th century, the basic sheep wagon design became increasingly standardized while remaining adaptable to individual ranchers' requirements. Schulte Hardware of Casper became one of the better-known manufacturers. Bayne Wagon Company supplied specialized running gear, and other commercial wagon manufacturers also produced sheep wagons.

The traditional wagon originally had wooden wheels and was moved by teams of horses. During the first half of the 20th century, rubber tires and motor vehicles increasingly replaced wooden running gear and horse teams. By the 1930s, metal roofs were replacing many of the original canvas roofs, although the basic interior arrangement remained largely unchanged.

By the 1940s, manufacturers were producing all-metal sheep wagons mounted on rubber tires. A 1940 account by Agnes Wright Spring described a new Schulte model as an all-metal, flat-bottomed wagon insulated with Cellatex and fitted with rubber tires. The same account noted that automobiles were beginning to displace the horse teams used to move sheep wagons.

The sheep wagon nevertheless remained in use after the introduction of motor vehicles. Changes in sheep husbandry, fencing, transportation, and the decline of large-scale open-range sheep operations eventually reduced the need for the traditional mobile sheep camp.

== Terminology ==
The terms sheep wagon and sheepwagon are both found in historical and modern sources. The two-word form is used in many institutional and historical sources, while sheepwagon occurs frequently as a closed compound in Wyoming historical writing and in Nancy Weidel's book Sheepwagon: Home on the Range.

Sheep wagons were also described as a "camp on wheels" and, in some contexts, simply as a sheep "camp." The term sheep camp, however, can refer to the entire mobile operation—including the herder, wagon, sheep, dogs, horses, and associated equipment—rather than exclusively to the wagon itself.

== Cultural legacy ==
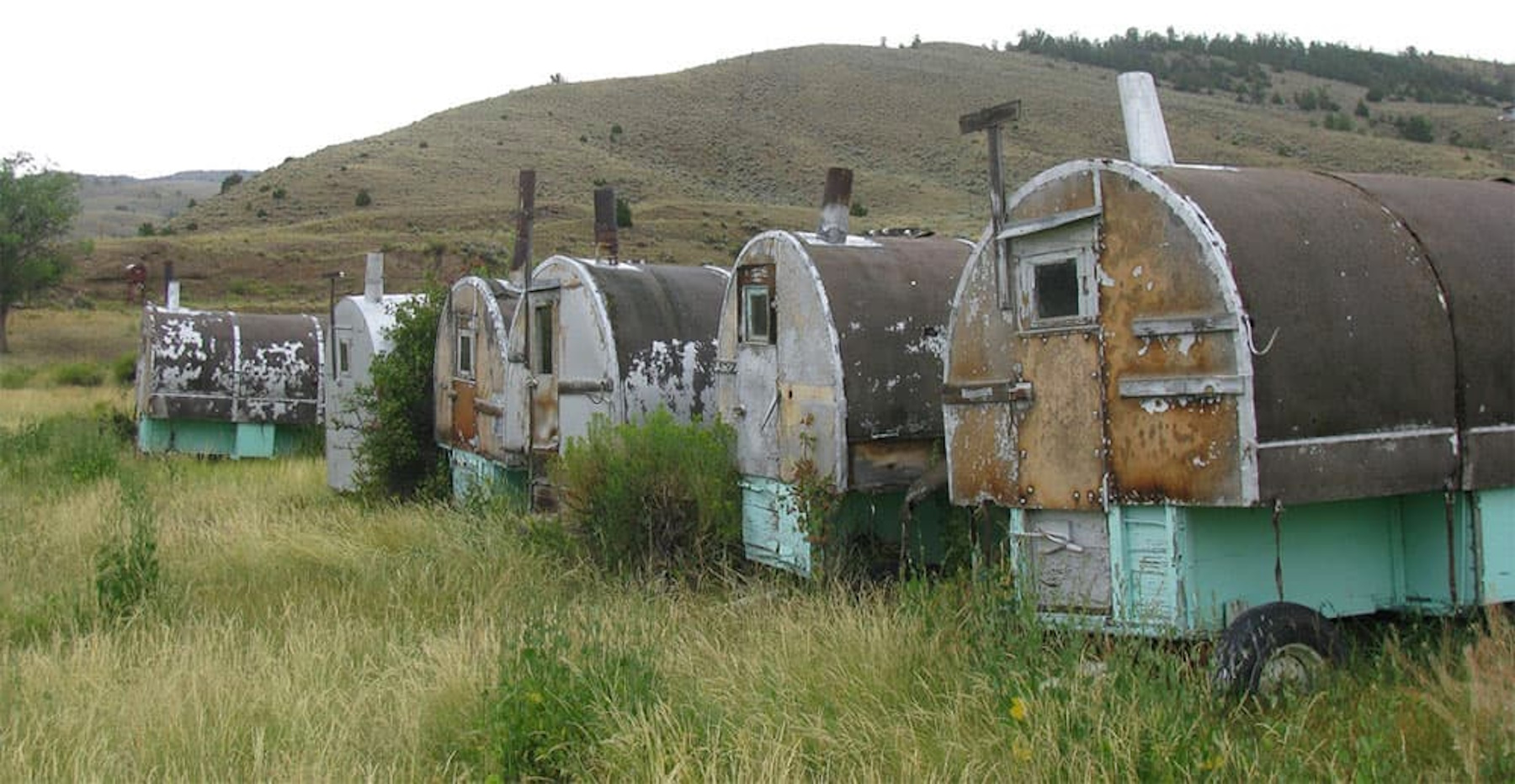
Old sheep wagons on a ranch in northern Wyoming, 2012

As open-range sheep husbandry declined, many sheep wagons were abandoned, converted to other uses, or preserved as historical artifacts. Some have been restored by museums, ranchers, and private collectors.

The sheep wagon has become particularly associated with Wyoming's sheep ranching heritage. Historic examples are held by museums and historical organizations in Wyoming and neighboring states. The Library of Congress holds a photograph by Arthur Rothstein showing a sheep wagon in Natrona County, Wyoming, photographed in May 1936 as part of the Farm Security Administration collection. This image is reproduced at the top of the page.

Nancy Weidel's Sheepwagon: Home on the Range, published in 2001, is devoted specifically to the history of the sheep wagon and the sheep industry that produced it. The book covers the origins and manufacture of sheep wagons, the lives of traditional sheepherders, the Basque influence on Western sheep herding, women and families who lived in wagons, and the preservation and restoration of historic wagons.

== See also ==
- Shepherd's hut
- Chuckwagon
- Covered wagon
- Sheepherding
- Sheep ranching
- History of Wyoming
- Range wars
