= Patrick Healy (sheepman) =

Irish-born American railroad engineer, sheepman and businessman (1847–1918)

- Born: February 17, 1847; Kenmare, County Kerry, Ireland
- Died: May 23, 1918 (aged 71); Ogden, Utah, U.S.
- Occupations: Railroad engineer, sheepman, banker, hotel proprietor
- Known for: Construction of the first transcontinental railroad; Healy and Patterson Sheep Company; Commercial National Bank of Ogden; Healy Hotel
- Spouse: Mary Ann Patterson (m. 1876)
- Children: 3 (surviving): Patrick "Patsy" Healy Jr., Alexander "Alec" Healy, and Helen "Nellie" Healy Lynch.

Patrick "Patsy" Healy (February 17, 1847 – May 23, 1918) was an Irish-born American railroad engineer, sheepman, banker, and businessman based in Ogden, Utah. After emigrating from Ireland as a teenager, he worked on construction of the first transcontinental railroad and witnessed the driving of the Golden Spike at Promontory Summit, Utah, on May 10, 1869. He later co-founded one of the largest sheep operations in the western United States, served for many years as president of the Commercial National Bank of Ogden, and built the Healy Hotel in Ogden.

== Early life ==
Healy was born on February 17, 1847, in Kenmare, County Kerry, Ireland. He emigrated to the United States in October 1862 at the age of fifteen, arriving with his mother and siblings. Alongside his father, who had arrived there a couple of years earlier, Healy worked in the copper mines of Hancock, Michigan. He then worked for while in the Michigan timber industry, where he learned to operate steam locomotives, hauling felled logs out of the forest. After the American Civil War, Healy left to seek his fortune in the West.

== Railroad career ==
This detail from Russell's "East and West shaking hands" photo may depict Patrick Healy

After a sojourn in the Black Hills, young Healy got a job with the Union Pacific Railroad out of Omaha, Nebraska, working in the westbound direction of what would become the transcontinental railroad. He left his Union Pacific job at Green River, Wyoming Territory in late 1868, and kept going west. In that year, the Central Pacific Railroad was seeking additional men as it expanded its line eastward across Nevada. Given his experience operating steam engines, it is plausible that Healy sought to find a higher level of skilled work with the Central Pacific than he had with Union Pacific. Healy arrived in Utah in 1868, reportedly walking 180 miles or so from Green River to Salt Lake City. He and a companion quickly secured horses and traveled to Central Pacific's operations hub at Wadsworth, Nevada. Healy, age 21, then obtained employment with the Central Pacific as an engineer. Healy's engine was named "The Emigrant." This was engine number 64. On May 10, 1869, Healy was present at Promontory Summit when the Golden Spike was driven, completing the first transcontinental railroad across the United States. Healy operated Central Pacific trains between Ogden and Toano, Nevada as well as other points in northern Utah for about ten years. He later became an honorary life member of the Brotherhood of Locomotive Engineers.

== Sheep business ==
After he left the railroad, Healy briefly ran some cattle in southern Idaho. Around 1880, Healy became a sheepman in partnership with his brother-in-law, Adam Patterson. Their firm, the Healy and Patterson Sheep Company, became one of the largest sheep operations in the American West. The partnership developed an extensive system of seasonal sheep drives across the open range of the unfenced Old West. Each spring, flocks purchased in California or Oregon were trailed to summer range near Soda Springs, Idaho. In autumn, portions of the flocks were sold locally while others were driven for winter grazing to the arid and semiarid winter ranges of the Great Basin and interior Wyoming, especially Wyoming's Red Desert. These ranges included sagebrush steppe, desert shrub and salt desert shrubland ecosystems.

Healy and Patterson's business was focused mainly on wool and secondarily on mutton from older sheep. "They would go out to Oregon and buy dry sheep. They didn't want any ewes with lambs. They wanted dry ewes and they wanted wethers [castrated male sheep]. Now in those days they ran the wethers until they were three or four years old. They would grow them out and they would get a clip of wool every spring from them. They didn't sell them as lambs. Then they would grow them out and send them on the fields of Nebraska or perhaps they were fat enough off of grass and ship them to market."

On June 20, 1884, The Salt Lake Daily Tribune featured a brief article about Healy and his sheep business, describing him as "one of the best men that ever stepped on Utah and Wyoming sagebrush." In Wyoming, Healy had just concluded the sale of "a large number of the wooly quadruped."

Patrick Healy around 1888

In a February 1891 interview, Healy described his current sheep operations and plans for the year. Asked where his sheep were ranging and how many he had, Healy reported that his eight herds, numbering about 20,000 sheep, were then wintering near Terrace, Utah, "on the desert." He said that "very little snow remains on the ground and the sheep have but little trouble in running about. The feed is excellent and the muttons are all fat and doing well." Healy said that the sheep would begin moving toward their spring range around March 1, to an area "between the head of Deep Creek and Bannock," about 30 miles west of Malad City, Idaho. He expected approximately 10,000 lambs by the autumn. After shearing, the flocks would be driven toward the vicinity of McCammon, Idaho, and then to summer range "about fifty miles east of Soda Springs," where they would remain until autumn storms forced them back onto the desert. Healy further stated that "the sheepmen throughout the country seem to have had the same good luck as ourselves and all feel much encouraged."

In the summer of 1892, the flock was driven high into the Bighorn Mountains of northern Wyoming. The Johnson County War had just ended, and the ranges in the Bighorns around Buffalo, Wyoming were depleted of cattle. Hence the opportunity for a flock was unusual. The sheep outfit trailed into Johnson County, where Healy and Patterson established a permanent operation.

In the early 1890s the partnership also purchased the Ross outfit at Mountain City, Nevada, where it maintained a flock of 30,000–40,000 sheep. For several years, the property served as an important operational base from which sheep were trailed to the summer range, before continuing on the firm's annual Wyoming grazing circuit. During the summer of 1897, Healy and Patterson reportedly controlled more than 100,000 sheep, including animals moving on the trail. Sheep were trailed in bands of as many as 8,000-10,000 sheep, with three men typically traveling with each band.

Healy preferred to avoid long-term investment in real estate, instead concentrating on livestock enterprises and partnerships in Utah, Idaho, Nevada and Wyoming. Under these other partnerships, the partner did the range work and Healy provided the financing and general supervision.

Healy helped many people, including his employees, develop their own sheep enterprises. In an oral history, Healy's grandson Dan Healy described the process. "They would give them a band of sheep and they would split the lambs and the wool and one thing and another. And at the end of the first year the herder would own one-sixth of the sheep, the second year, they would own one-third and the third year they would own one-half and meanwhile they would build up the herd. They would try to keep most of the ewe lambs.... They literally lived with the sheep. It was tough out there. Maybe they didn’t even have much, they might have had a wagon. But they would eat mutton and flour and sugar and that was about it. So at the end of three years, why, they owned a half a band of sheep and the band had gotten larger."

As the era of long-distance open-range sheep trailing declined in the early twentieth century, Healy and later his sons continued their primary operations in northern Wyoming, where they made seasonal movements of sheep between winter and summer ranges near Buffalo and in the Bighorn Mountains.

=== Anecdotes ===
Anecdotal evidence suggests that Healy could be a "pretty tough guy," if the occasion called for it. The story goes that despite repeated warnings not to do so, another sheep outfit was running its flock on land in the Bighorns to which Healy had the grazing rights. One day on the land the intruding sheepman was sitting on a rock, holding the reins of his mule. A rifle shot rang out and the reins were severed. Healy had made himself very well understood.

Fellow sheepman A. J. Knollin told an anecdote about camping with Healy in an Oregon mountain meadow in the 1890s, on a sheep-buying trip. Knollin recalled that the two men had climbed into his bedroll (tarp and blankets), lying back-to-back. Suddenly, Healy exclaimed "My God! A minute later, he said “My God!” again. A moment or two later, he said “My God!” again. Knollin asked what was wrong. Healy replied that he had slept in bedrolls from Texas to Montana, and from Oregon to Michigan, but this was the first time that he had ever slept in a bedroll that contained sheets! Knollin explained that his wife had purchased the sheets and placed them in the bedroll. In a 1970 interview, 87-year-old Henry Finch of Soda Springs had related Knollin's story to Dan Healy, who subsequently recounted it within the family.

=== Business practices ===
The Healy and Patterson partnership was one of the largest sheep operations in the West — yet it never kept a book or an account. When livestock or property was divided between the partners, the assets were apportioned by agreement, after which a card game determined which partner received each share.

A gentleman named Charles Wells (born 1854) was a rancher in remote Washakie County, Wyoming. He wrote an autobiographical statement for the Wyoming Pioneers project in 1936. In 1899, he "went over the mountain" and bought 2,000 sheep from Healy and Patterson. "Patsy Healy was the father of Alex Healy, now of Worland, Wyoming, who still merits the qualities of his father.... If I recall correctly, the Healy and Patterson outfit at one time ran better than 75,000 head of sheep on the Big Horn mountains, besides large interests in Montana, Idaho and Nevada. They were not only successful in a financial way, but likewise were successful in establishing and perpetuating a wholesome respect for their methods of operating throughout their long careers in the range business, by the constant practice of fair and just dealings."

== Recruitment of Basque sheepherders ==
Healy played an important role in the early recruitment of Basque sheepherders to northern Wyoming. According to accounts preserved by the Basque community in Buffalo, in 1902 the French Basque immigrant Jean Esponda met Healy while traveling west by train after arriving in the United States. Esponda had intended to return to California, where he had previously worked as a sheepherder, but accepted employment after Healy offered him a position with Healy and Patterson in Buffalo. Esponda subsequently encouraged relatives and fellow Basques from the Baigorri region of the French Basque Country to immigrate to Johnson County. Their arrival marked the beginning of a chain migration that established one of the largest Basque communities in Wyoming, supplying experienced sheepherders to the state's sheep industry for decades. Many of these also became prominent ranchers and other businessmen in their own right.

== Association with Bill Nye ==
Healy was acquainted with the Wyoming journalist and humorist Edgar Wilson "Bill" Nye, and gave him ideas for stories. Nye was editor of the Laramie Boomerang newspaper in Laramie, Wyoming in the early 1880s. Nye had established a reputation for humorous sketches of life in Wyoming territory and the American West, and syndicated his work to newspapers elsewhere in the country.

Two humorous fictional sketches in which Healy was a character appeared in newspapers outside Wyoming in November 1882. "He Quit the Cattle Business," published in the Tombstone Weekly Epitaph on November 25, portrayed Healy as a sheepman and former cattleman who a few years earlier had purchased 500 head of cattle after hearing that cattle raising could produce profits approaching 100 percent. He described the laborious process of branding calves individually, only to encounter a neighboring cattleman whose cowboy used a fantastically more efficient method involving a "little charcoal stove attached to his saddle" and a branding iron attached to a 200 foot long lariat. Healy concluded with chagrin that the cattle business required a degree of "science" for which he was unsuited and sold his cattle to the other rancher. The sketch contrasted cattle raising with Healy's preference to "squeeze along" with sheep raising and its mere 35 to 40 percent profits.

Three days later, on November 28, the Sedalia Weekly Bazoo published "Was Not a Humorist," another tall tale with Healy as protagonist. According to the story, Healy was a sheepman who had detected gold-bearing soil in a sheep dipping corral in Laramie, falling from the wool of sheep that had been trailed from California's gold country. He subsequently hired an old-timer to pan the sediment, obtaining a profitable quantity of gold. He excitedly traveled east and approached the owner of a Boston wool emporium, proposing with amusing rhetorical flourishes that for $100,000, he could show the company how to recover millions of dollars worth of gold from the sediment produced in washing wool. The Boston businessman, however, revealed with similar verbal extravagance that as an old 49er he was already familiar with the phenomenon and demonstrated that gold was already being recovered from the material. The story ends with Healy returning to the West in shock after being outsmarted by the wily wool merchant of the "effete east."

== Banking and other business interests ==
Portion of a full-page article about the Healy Hotel

During the 1880s, Healy acquired stock in the Commercial National Bank of Ogden. He later became its president and remained in that office until his death in 1918. Through the bank Healy financed numerous sheepmen in Utah, Idaho, Nevada and Wyoming, including several former employees who later established independent sheep operations. As described above, Healy and Patterson had already "staked out" (i.e. financially backed) such sheepmen independently, before Healy's formal affiliation with the bank. Healy also held large investments in the sugar industries of both Utah and Wyoming, and in 1901 constructed the Healy Hotel in Ogden.

== Personal life ==
Healy married Mary Ann Patterson in February 1876. They owned a fine home at 2529 Jefferson Avenue in Ogden. Of ten children born to the couple, only the three oldest survived childhood: Patrick "Patsy" Healy Jr.; Helen "Nellie" Healy Lynch; and Alexander "Alec" Healy. According to Healy's 1908 passport application, he was naturalized as a U.S. citizen in December 1886. Healy, Mary Ann and Healy's younger brother Daniel traveled to Europe for several months in 1909.

In declining health, Healy spent the winter of 1917–1918 in southern California before returning to Ogden, where he died on May 23, 1918, aged seventy-one.

== Legacy ==
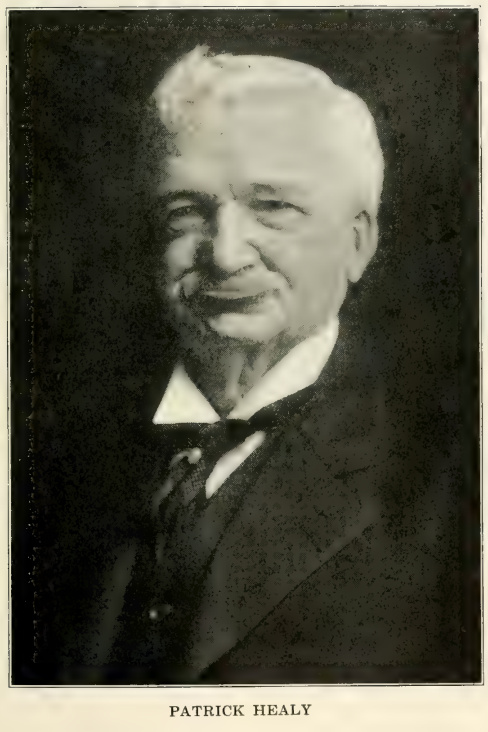
Healy, late in life

Patrick Healy was among the leading figures in the development of the western sheep industry during the late nineteenth century. Through Healy and Patterson he established large-scale sheep operations extending across Oregon, Idaho, Utah, Nevada, and Wyoming. He also helped to provide financing for numerous independent sheep ranchers throughout the Intermountain West.

The Healy and Patterson Sheep Company amicably dissolved in 1904, when Patrick Jr. bought out his uncle Adam Patterson's share. The firm operated as Healy & Healy until 1906, when Alexander, an MIT-trained mining engineer, bought out Patrick Sr.'s share of the sheep operation. The firm then operated as Healy Brothers. With its LU Ranch, the Healy family remains active in northern Wyoming livestock operations to the present day.

== Sources ==
- "Western Items". The Cheyenne Leader. Cheyenne, Wyoming. July 18, 1868. p. 1.
- "He Quit the Cattle Business". Tombstone Weekly Epitaph. Tombstone, Arizona Territory. November 25, 1882.
- "Was Not a Humorist". Sedalia Weekly Bazoo. Sedalia, Missouri. November 28, 1882.
- "The Way It Was". Salt Lake Daily Tribune. June 20, 1884.
- "The Sheep Business: Excellent business prospects for next season". Ogden Daily Standard. February 20, 1891.
- "Local News". Intermountain Catholic. Salt Lake City. August 14, 1909. p. 7.
- "Patrick Healy, Sr. Called By Death Yesterday". The Ogden Standard. Ogden City, Utah: Standard Publishing Co. May 24, 1918.
- "Ogden Man Tells About Railroads in Earliest Days". Ogden Examiner. May 4, 1919. p. 12 – via Utah Digital Newspapers.
- Bartlett, I. S., ed. (1918). History of Wyoming. Vol. 1. Chicago: The S. J. Clarke Publishing Company.
- Warrum, Noble, ed. (1919). Utah Since Statehood: Historical and Biographical. Vol. 2. Chicago and Salt Lake City: S. J. Clarke Publishing Company.
- Wentworth, Edward Norris (1948). America's Sheep Trails: History, Personalities. Ames, Iowa: The Iowa State College Press.
- "Oral History Interview with Dan Healy". Wyoming State Archives Oral History Collection. Wyoming State Archives. October 5, 1990.
- Iberlin, Dollie; Romtvedt, David, eds. (2011). Buffalotarrak: An Anthology of the Basques of Buffalo, Wyoming. Basque Diaspora and Migration Studies. Vol. 6. Reno, Nevada: Center for Basque Studies, University of Nevada, Reno. ISBN 978-1-935709-14-5.
- Healy, Cathy (2013). An Improbable Pioneer: The Letters of Edith S. Holden Healy, 1911–1950. Worland, Wyoming: Washakie Museum & Cultural Center. ISBN 978-0-9897453-0-7.
- "Buffalo celebrates rich Basque culture". Wyoming Livestock Roundup. August 24, 2011.
- Schaetzl, Randall. "Railroad logging". Geography of Michigan and the Great Lakes Region. Michigan State University.
- "Central Pacific Railroad Locomotives". CPRR.org. Central Pacific Railroad Photographic History Museum.
- Wyoming State Archives Digital Collections. "Wyoming WPA Biographical File regarding Charles Wells." "As told by Charles Wells." Transcribed by Verda L. Burnam, Basin, Wyoming, February 5, 1941.
