= Shepherd's hut =

Mobile agricultural shelter

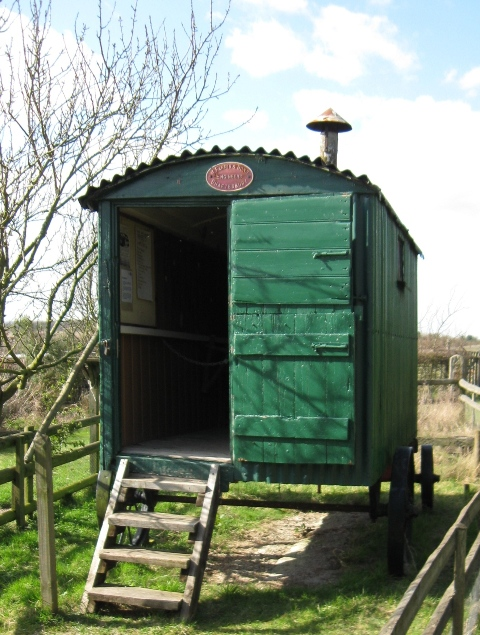
Shepherd's hut at the College Lake nature reserve in Buckinghamshire, England

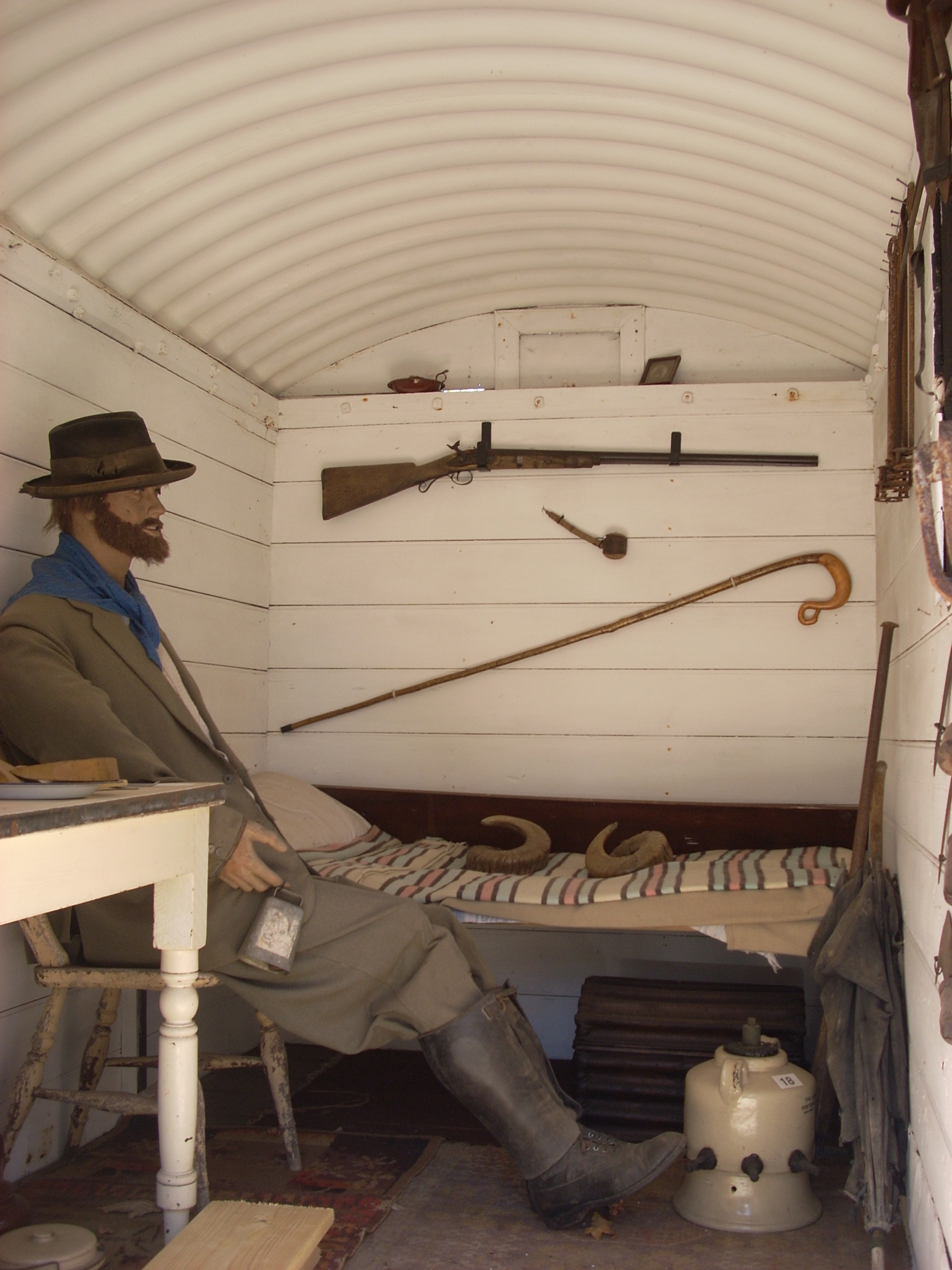
Interior of a hut at a museum

The shepherd's hut (also shepherd's wagon or caravan and sheep hut) was, since the 14th century and into the 20th century, used by shepherds during sheep raising and lambing, primarily in the United Kingdom and France. Shepherd's huts often had iron wheels and corrugated iron tops. Sometimes the sides were also made of corrugated iron.

== Background ==
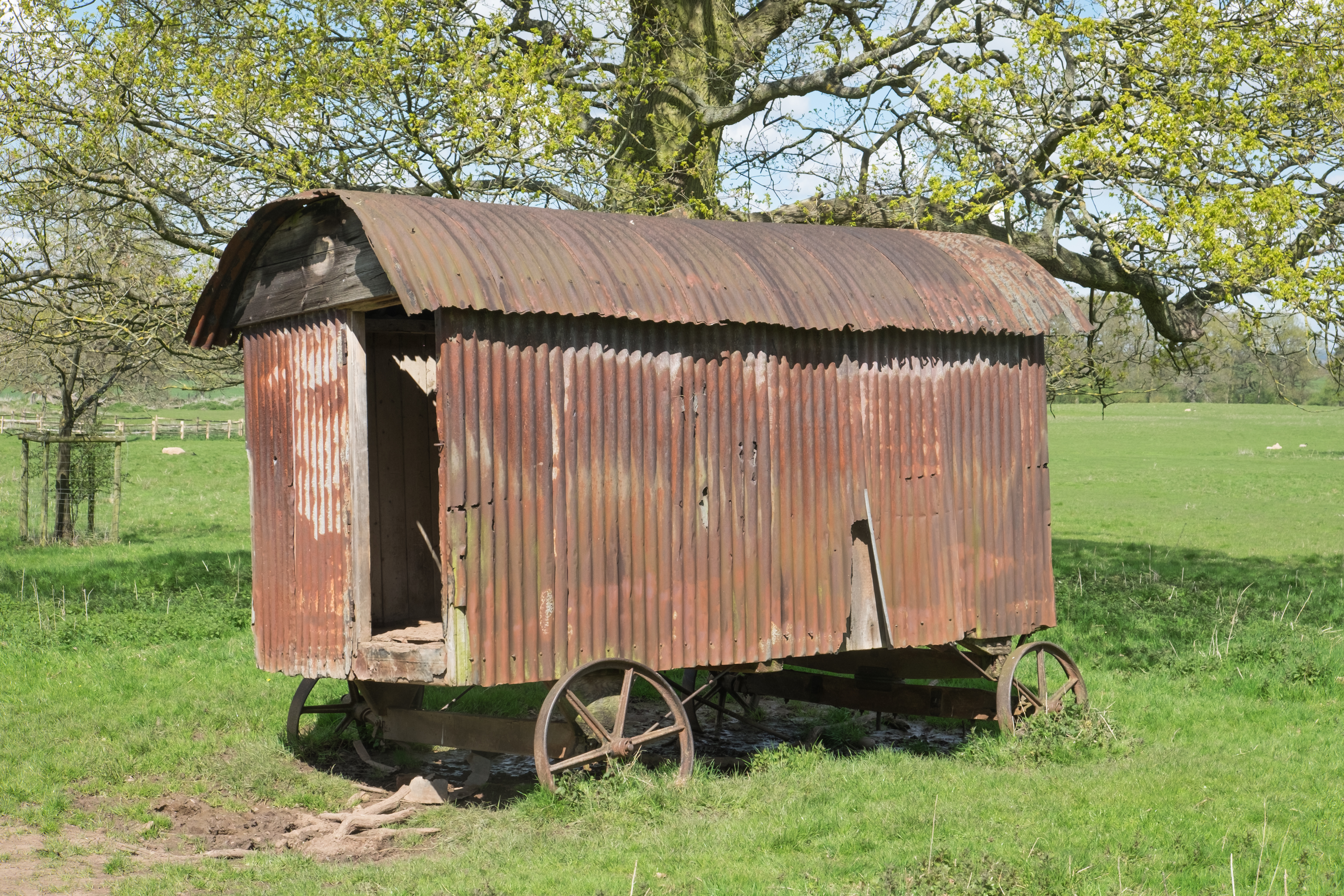
Derelict hut in the parkland at Hanbury Hall

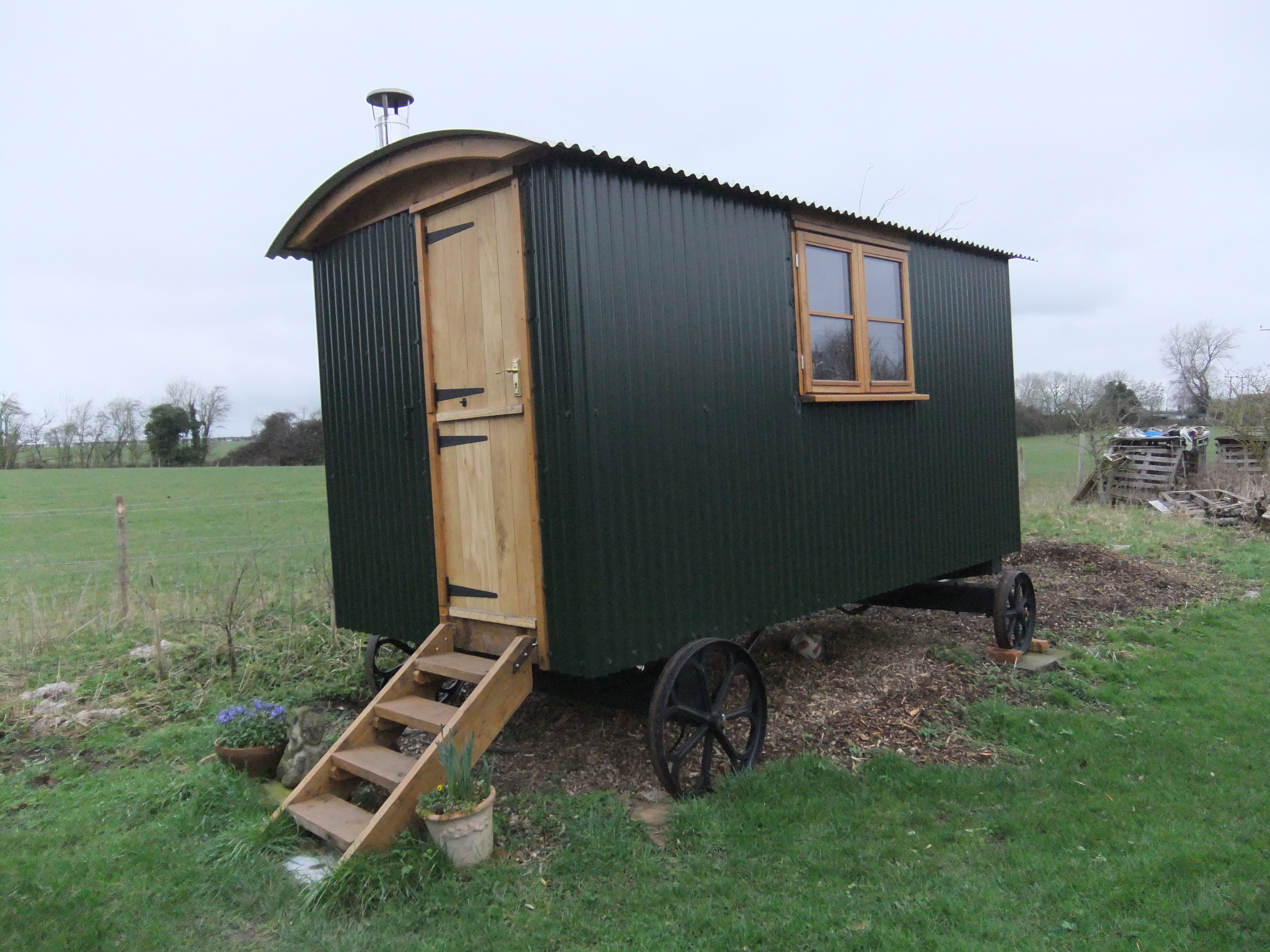
A reproduction shepherd's hut

Use of shepherd's huts by farmers reached a peak in the late 19th century and dwindled in the 20th century with the advent of mechanised farm machinery and electric power reaching even remote farms. Their use persisted in some northern counties in the United Kingdom, particularly Westmoreland and Northumberland, where the terrain of the uplands supports little else but sheep farming.

There have been numerous different materials used to construct shepherd's huts and after World War I, when metal was in short supply the chassis were often built with wood and the sides built with interlocking planks of larch or spruce. Sometimes the roof covering would be constructed from felt and tar and insulated with lambswool. Cast iron wheels were frequently recycled from other farm machinery. There are now very few examples of the later 20th century shepherd's huts in the county of Westmorland which became Cumbria in 1974.

The shepherd's hut was a kitchen, dining room, bedroom, sitting room and storeroom all rolled into one. The designs vary but all were constructed to provide the shepherd with practical and durable accommodation. The old huts had a stove in one corner for warmth and cooking, and a window on each side so the shepherd could see the flock. A hinged stable door, which was always positioned away from the prevailing wind, enabled him to hear the flock, and strong axles with cast iron wheels were used to withstand the constant movement from field to field.

In North America, it is called a sheep wagon:

Sheep wagon. Small, bow-topped caravan used by shepherds in the Rocky Mountains of North America. Either dead axle or hung on sideways semi-elliptical springs. The interior contained a single bed-bunk in a crosswise position, folding table and cooking stove. Used from the 1880's onwards. Drawn by a single horse in shafts. —D.J.M. Smith

Shepherds huts are still in use today, but primarily as glamping accommodation, or as an alternative to a summer house, home office, shed, or workshop.

== See also ==
- Living van – Towed temporary living quarters
- Pastoralism – Branch of agriculture concerned with raising livestock
- Transhumance – Type of pastoralism
- Vardo (Romani wagon) – Traditional horse-drawn wagon of the Romanichal
- Beach hut – Type of hut
