= Shepherd =

Person who tends, feeds, or guards flocks of sheep

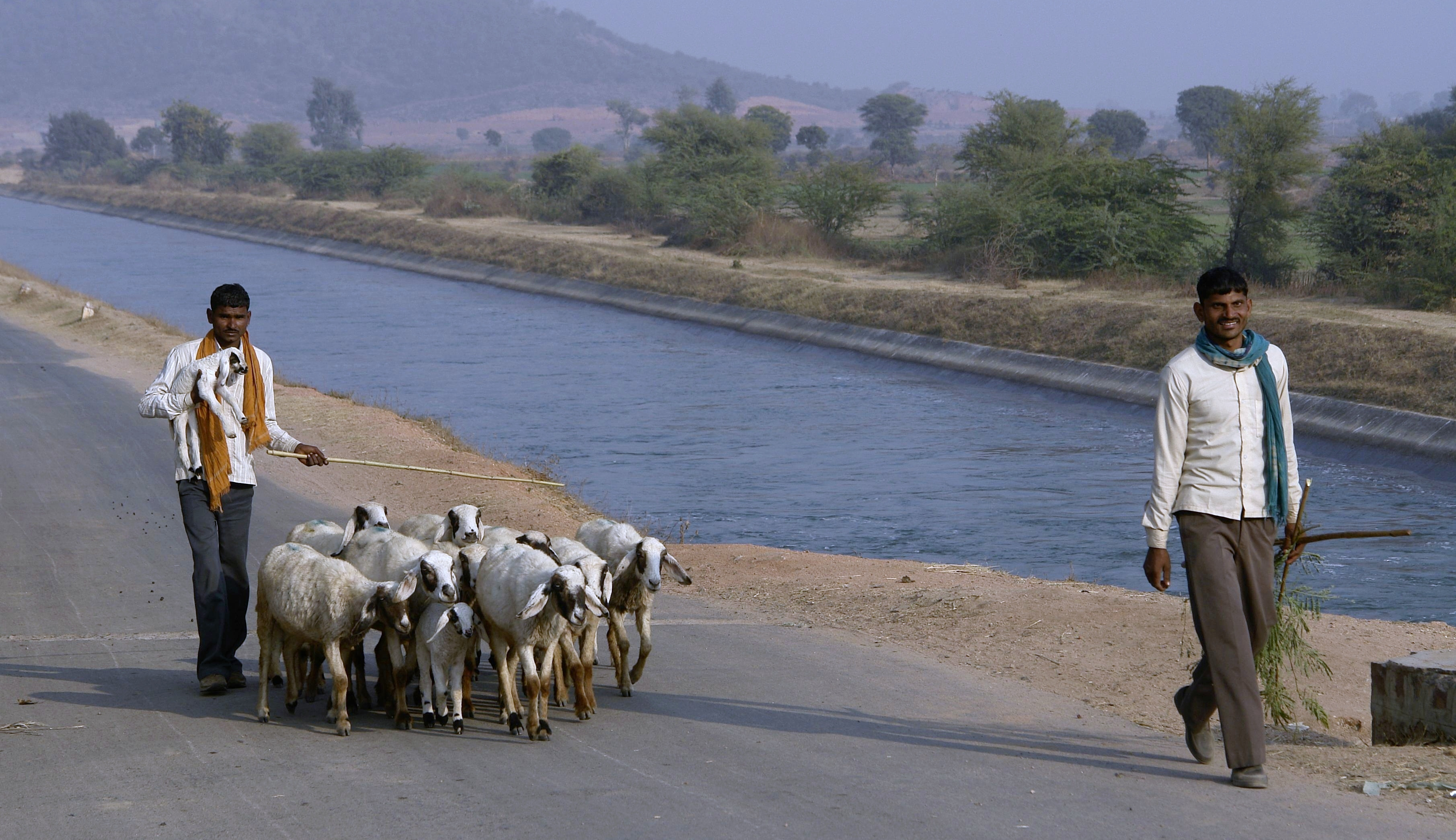
Shepherds travelling in Chambal, India

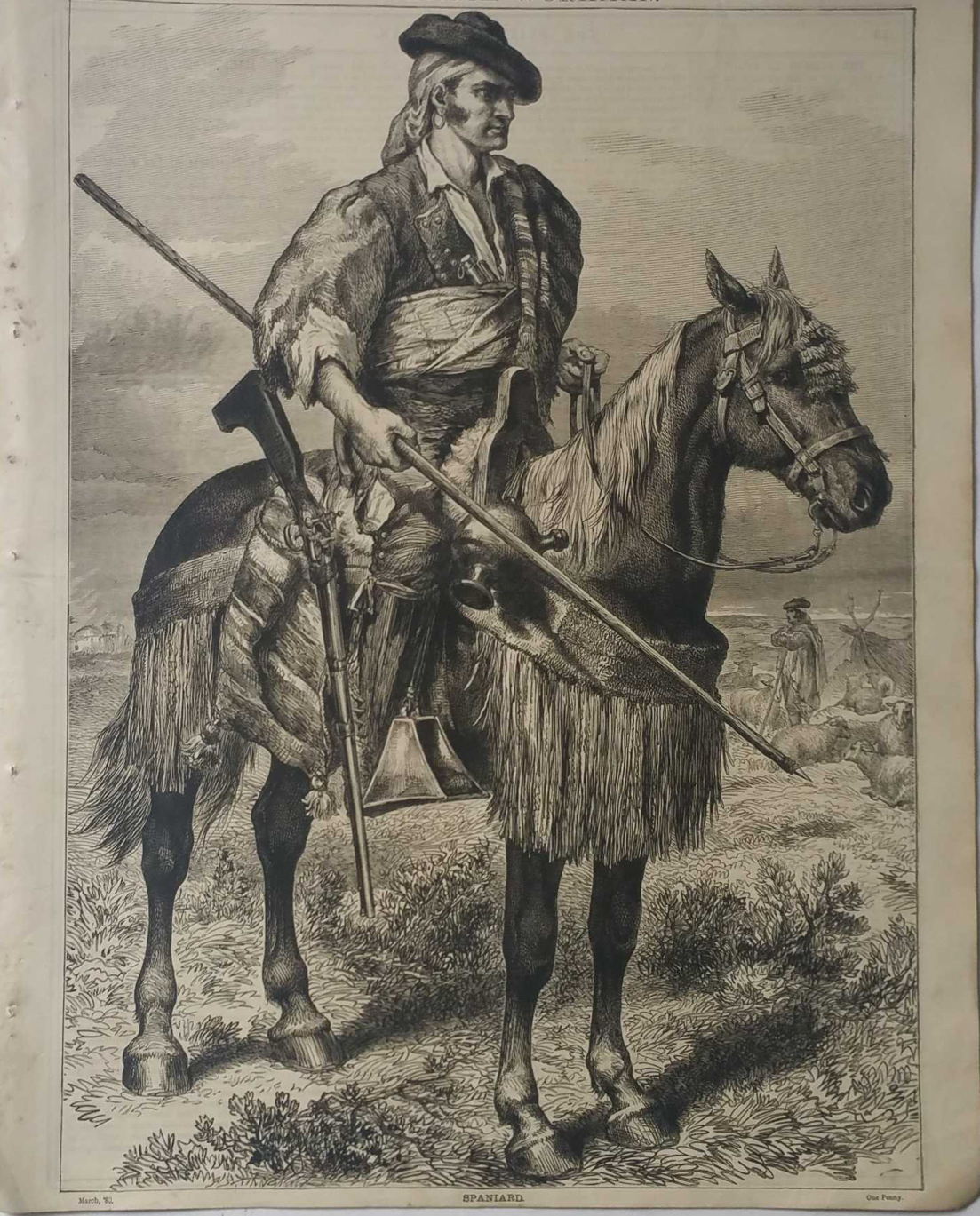
Spanish shepherd on horseback herding sheep in Murcia (1880).

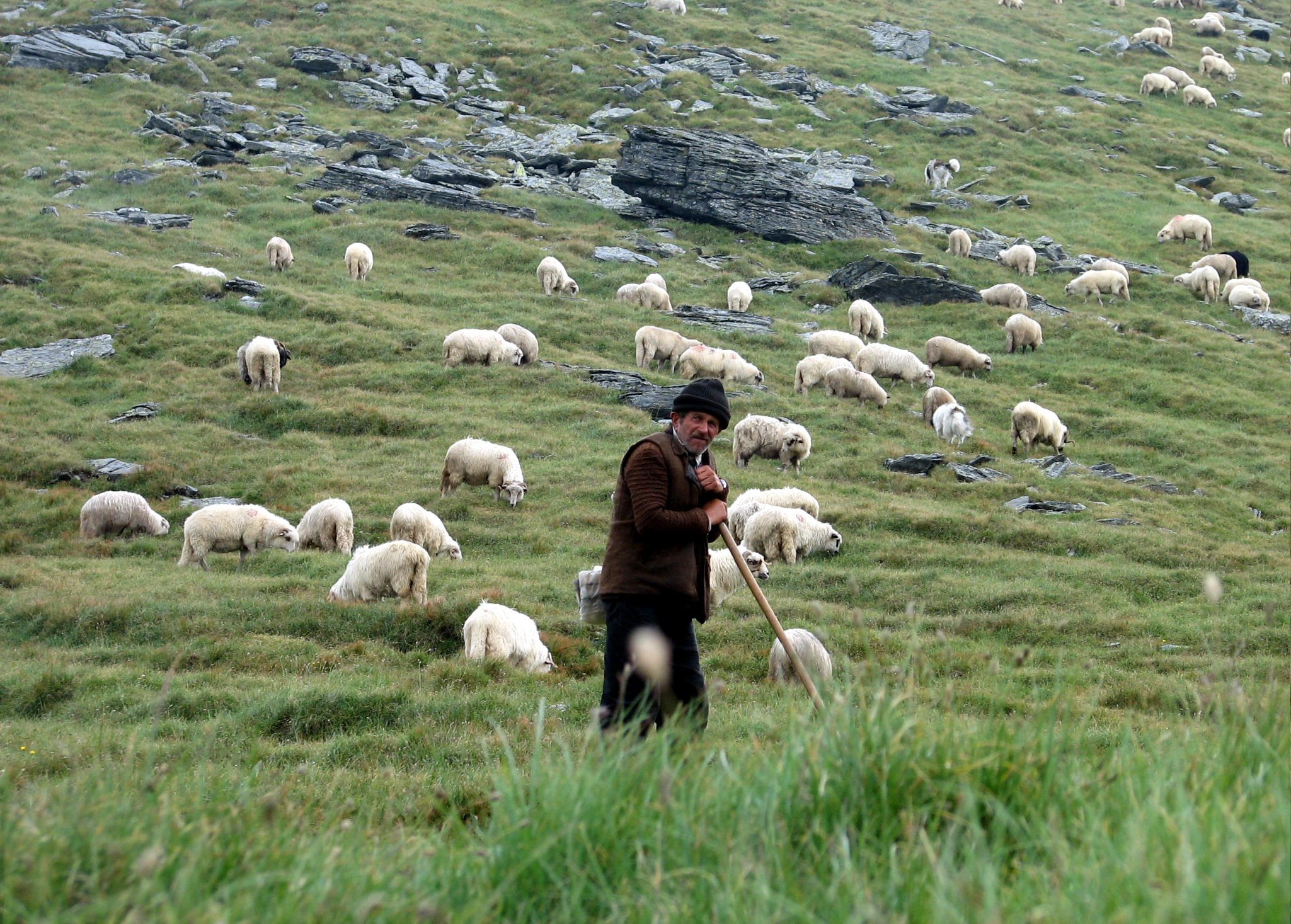
Shepherd with grazing sheep in Făgăraș Mountains, Romania

A shepherd is a person who tends, herds, feeds, or guards flocks of sheep. Shepherding is one of the world's oldest occupations; it exists in many parts of the globe, and it is an important part of pastoralist animal husbandry.

Because the occupation is so widespread, many religions and cultures have symbolic or metaphorical references to shepherds. For example, Jesus called himself the Good Shepherd, and ancient Greek mythologies highlighted shepherds such as Endymion. This symbolism and shepherds as characters are at the center of pastoral literature and art.

== Origins ==
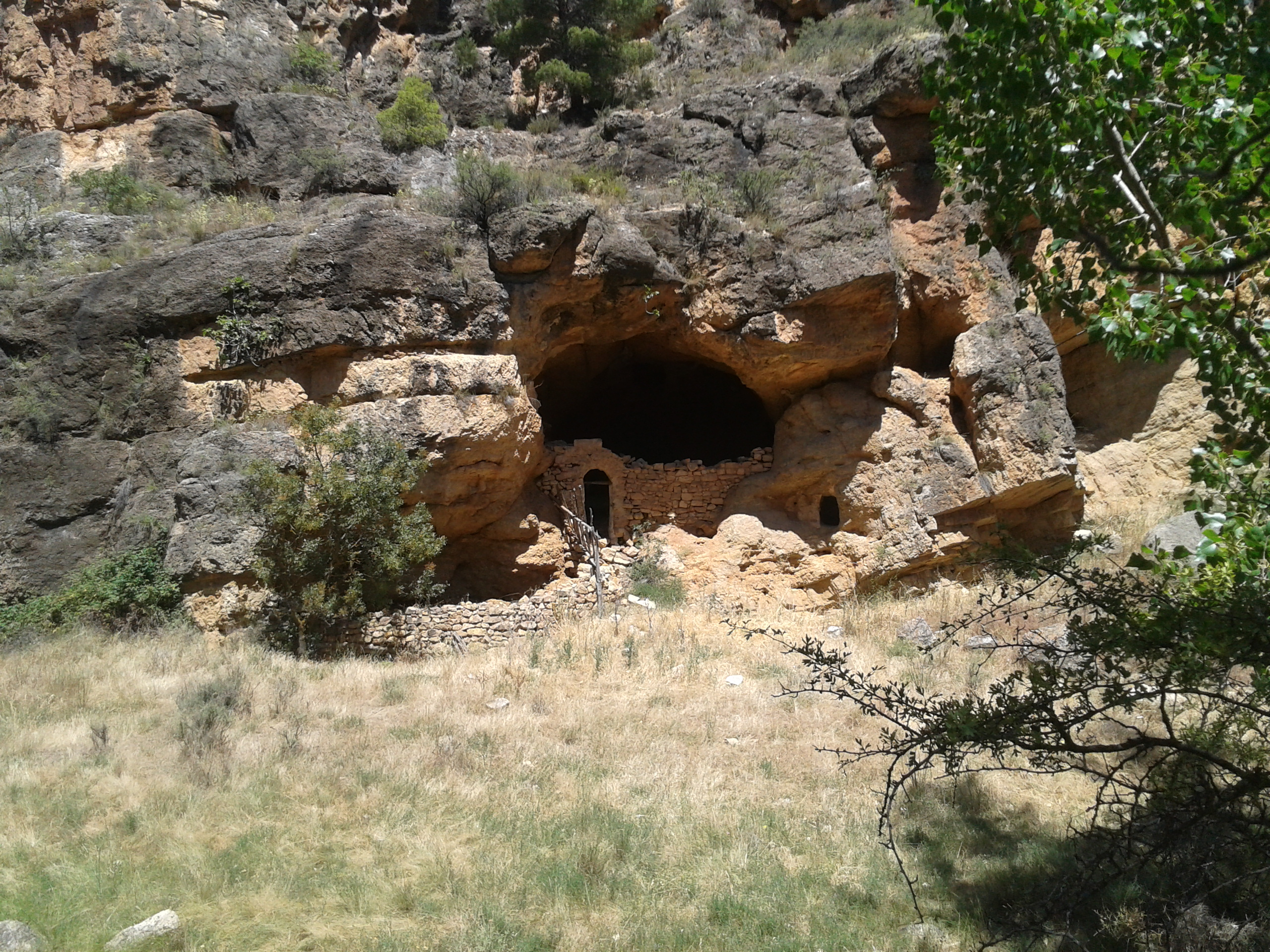
Middle Age livestock shelter or paridera in a natural cave in Piedra River in the monk's old path from the monastery to the roe deer salt ponds, Aragon, Spain

Shepherding is among the oldest occupations, beginning some 5,000 years ago in Asia Minor. Sheep were kept for their milk, their meat and especially their wool. Over the next thousand years, sheep and shepherding spread throughout Eurasia. Henri Fleisch tentatively suggested that the Shepherd Neolithic industry of Lebanon may date to the Epipaleolithic and that it may have been practised by one of the first cultures of nomadic shepherds in the Beqaa Valley.

Some sheep were integrated in the family farm along with other animals such as chickens and pigs. However, to maintain a large flock, the sheep must be able to move from pasture to pasture. This required the development of an occupation separate from that of the farmer. The duty of shepherds was to keep their flock intact, protect it from predators and guide it to market areas in time for shearing. In ancient times, shepherds also commonly milked their sheep, and made cheese from this milk; a few shepherds still do this today.

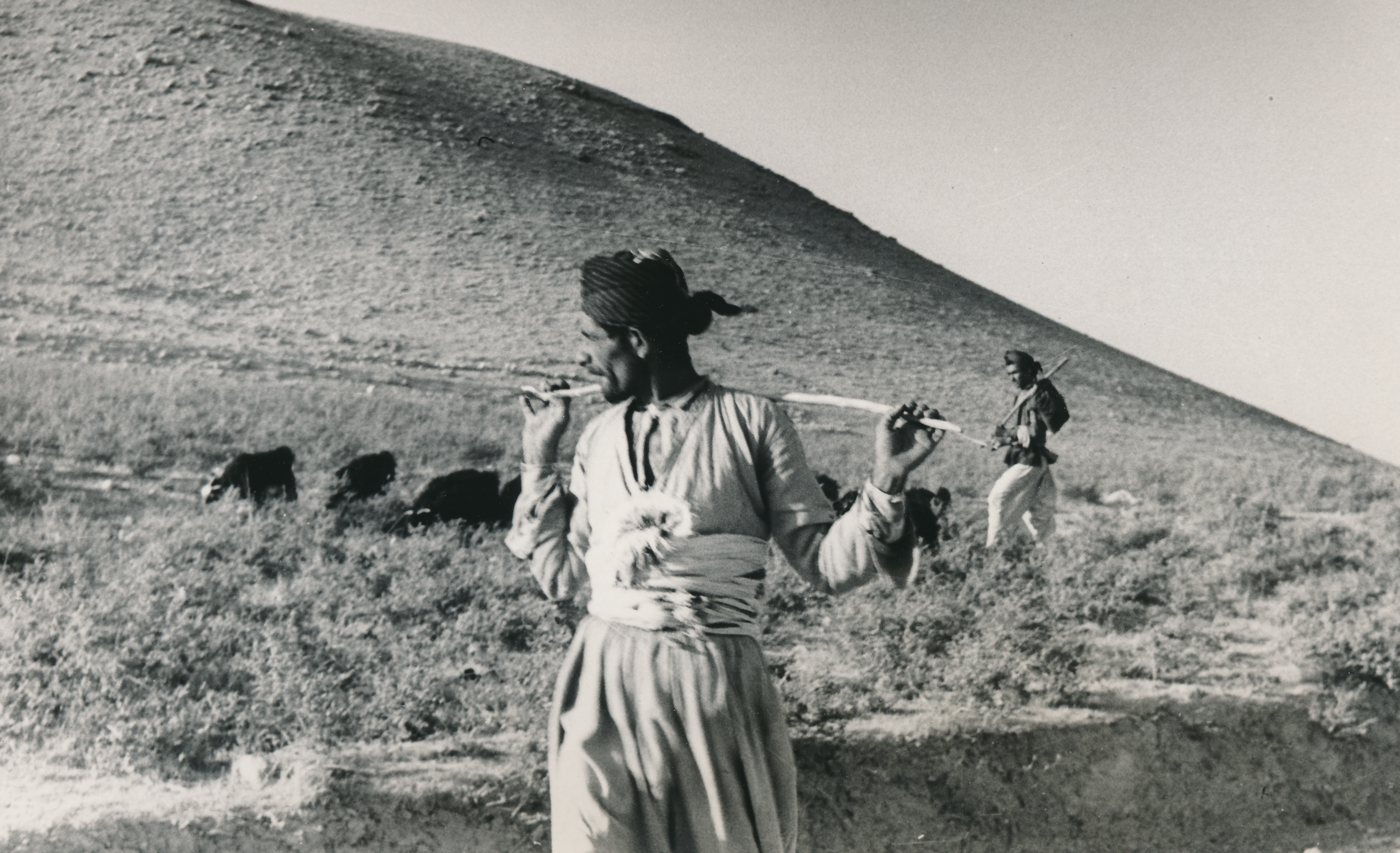
A Kurdish shepherd, 1958

In many societies, shepherds were an important part of the economy. Unlike farmers, shepherds were often wage earners, being paid to watch the sheep of others. Shepherds also lived apart from society, being largely nomadic. It was mainly a job for solitary males without children, and new shepherds thus needed to be recruited externally. Shepherds were most often the younger sons of farming peasants who did not inherit any land. In other societies, each family would have a family member to shepherd its flock, often a child, youth or an elder who could not help much with harder work; these shepherds were fully integrated in society.

Shepherds would normally work in groups: either looking after one large flock, or each bringing their own and merging their responsibilities. They would live in small cabins, often shared with their sheep, and would buy food from local communities. Less often shepherds lived in covered wagons that traveled with their flocks.

Shepherding developed only in certain areas. In the lowlands and river valleys, it was far more efficient to grow grain and cereals than to allow sheep to graze; thus the raising of sheep was confined to rugged and mountainous areas. In pre-modern times shepherding was thus centered on regions such as the Middle East, Greece, the Pyrenees, the Carpathian Mountains, Scotland and Northern England.

== Shepherd's crook ==
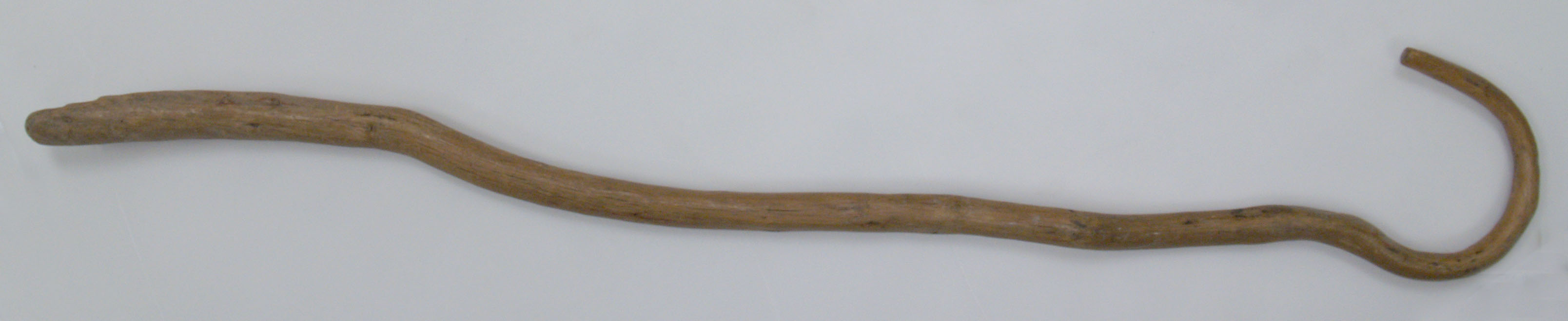
Shepherd's crook

The shepherd's crook is a strong multi-purpose stick or staff, often fashioned with a hooked end.

== Modern times ==
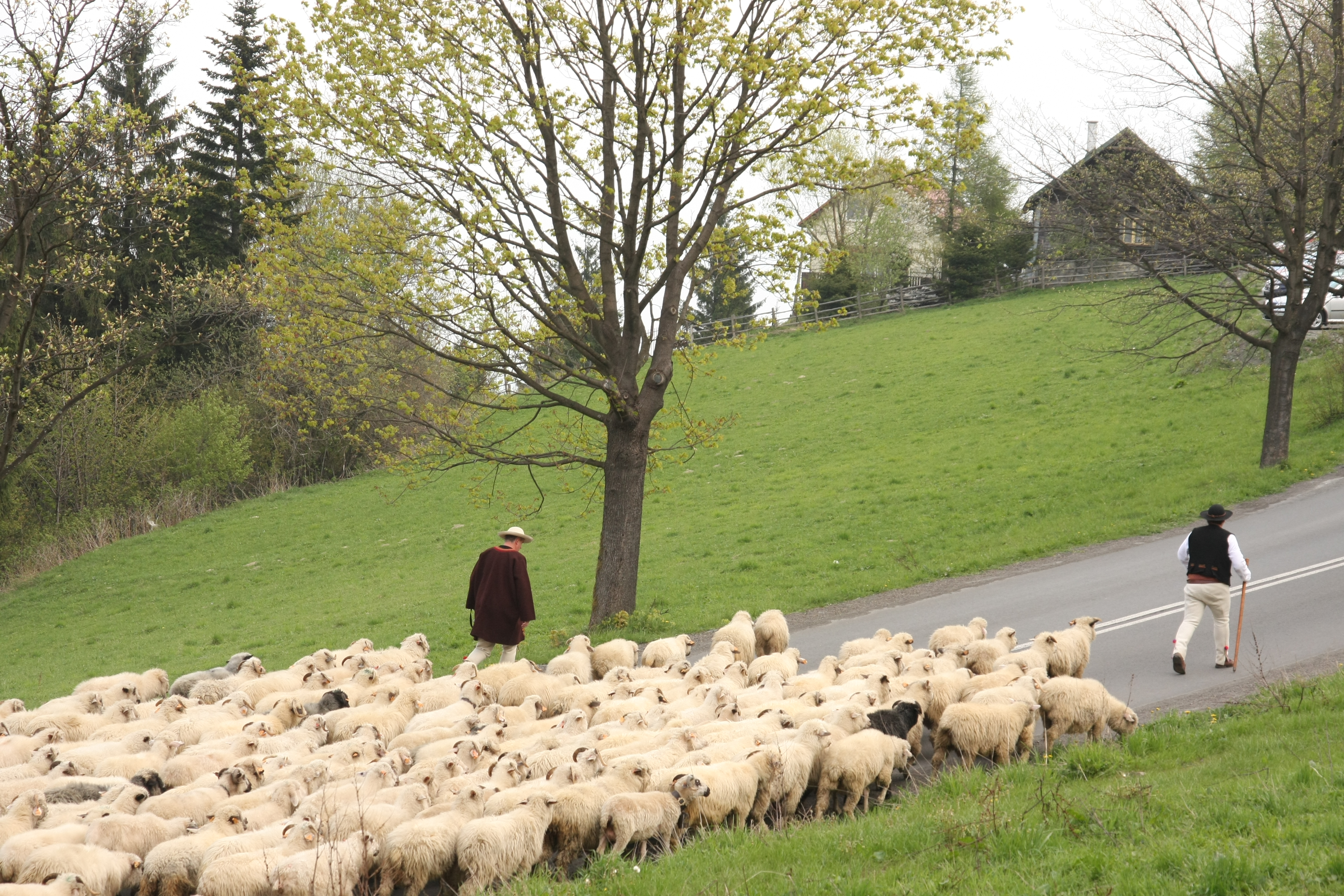
Shepherds at work, 2017, Beskids, Carpathian Mountains

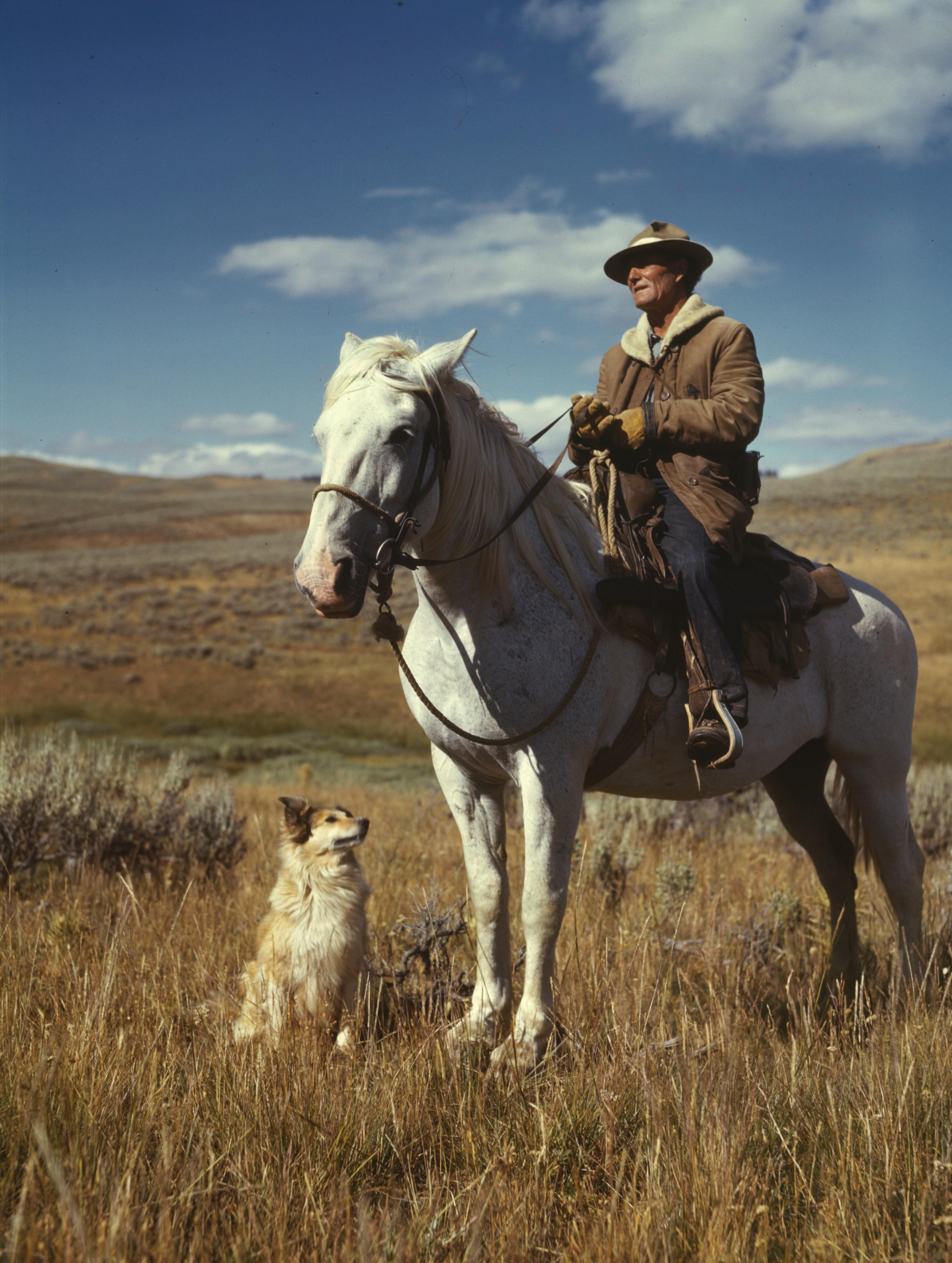
Shepherd with his horse and dog, Montana 1942

In modern times, shepherding has changed dramatically. The enclosure of many common lands in Europe in the 18th and 19th centuries shifted some shepherds from independent nomads to employees of massive estates. Some families in Africa and Asia have their wealth in sheep, so a young son is sent out to guard them while the rest of the family tends to other chores. In the US, many sheep herds are flocked over public Bureau of Land Management (BLM) lands.

Wages are higher than was the case in the past. Keeping a shepherd in constant attendance can be costly. Also, the eradication of sheep predators in parts of the world has lessened the need for shepherds. In places like Britain, hardy breeds of sheep have frequently been left alone without a shepherd for long periods. More productive breeds of sheep can be left in fields and moved periodically to fresh pasture when necessary. Hardier breeds of sheep can be left on hillsides. The sheep farmer will attend to the sheep when necessary at times like lambing or shearing.

== By country ==
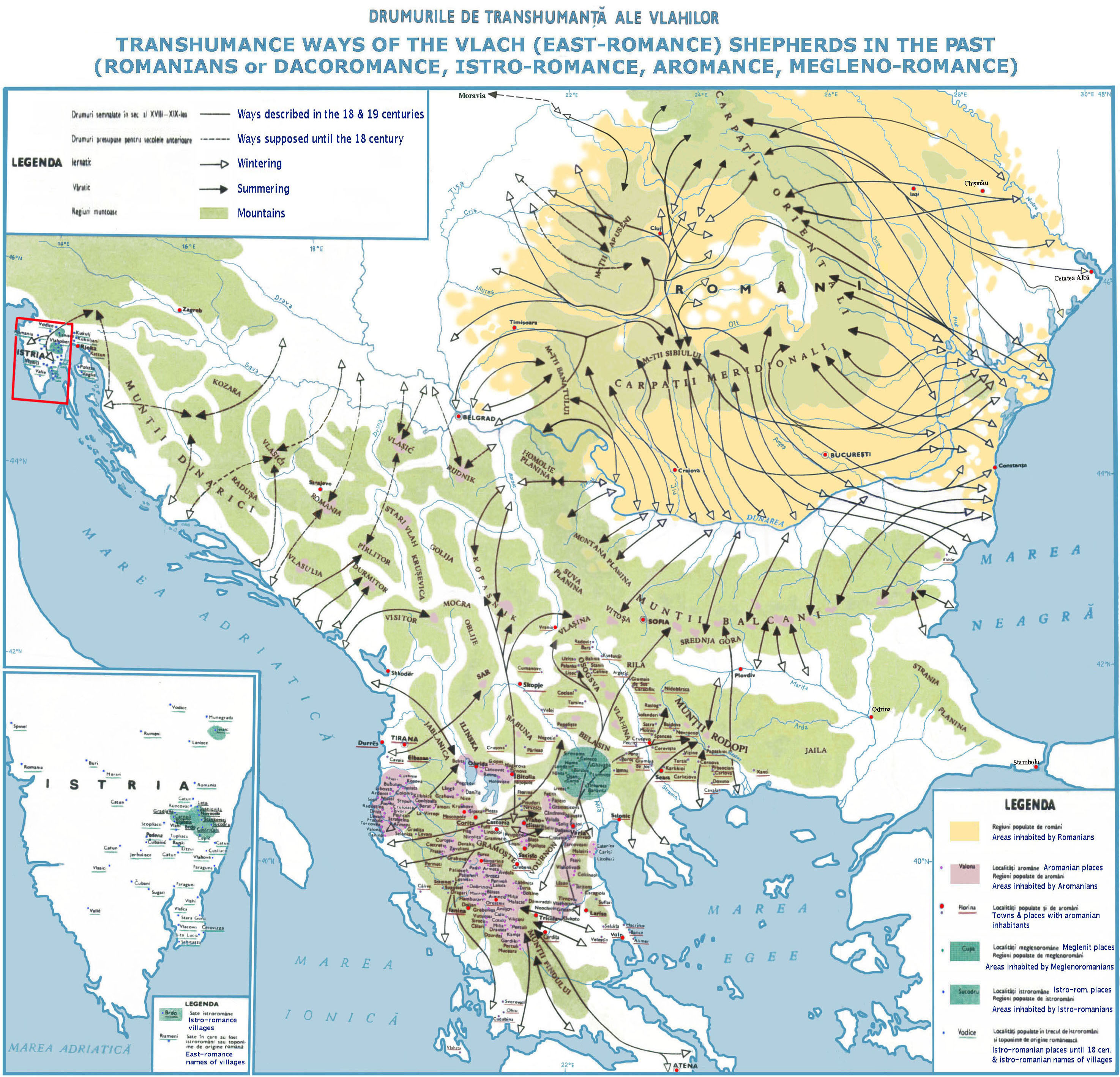
Transhumance ways of the Vlach shepherds in the past

=== Eurasia ===
==== Cyprus ====
The first Shepherd's Fair was announced to take place in the Cyprus Village of Pachna, on August 31, 2014, in the printed editions of Cyprus Weekly and in the Greek-language daily, Phileleftheros.

==== China ====
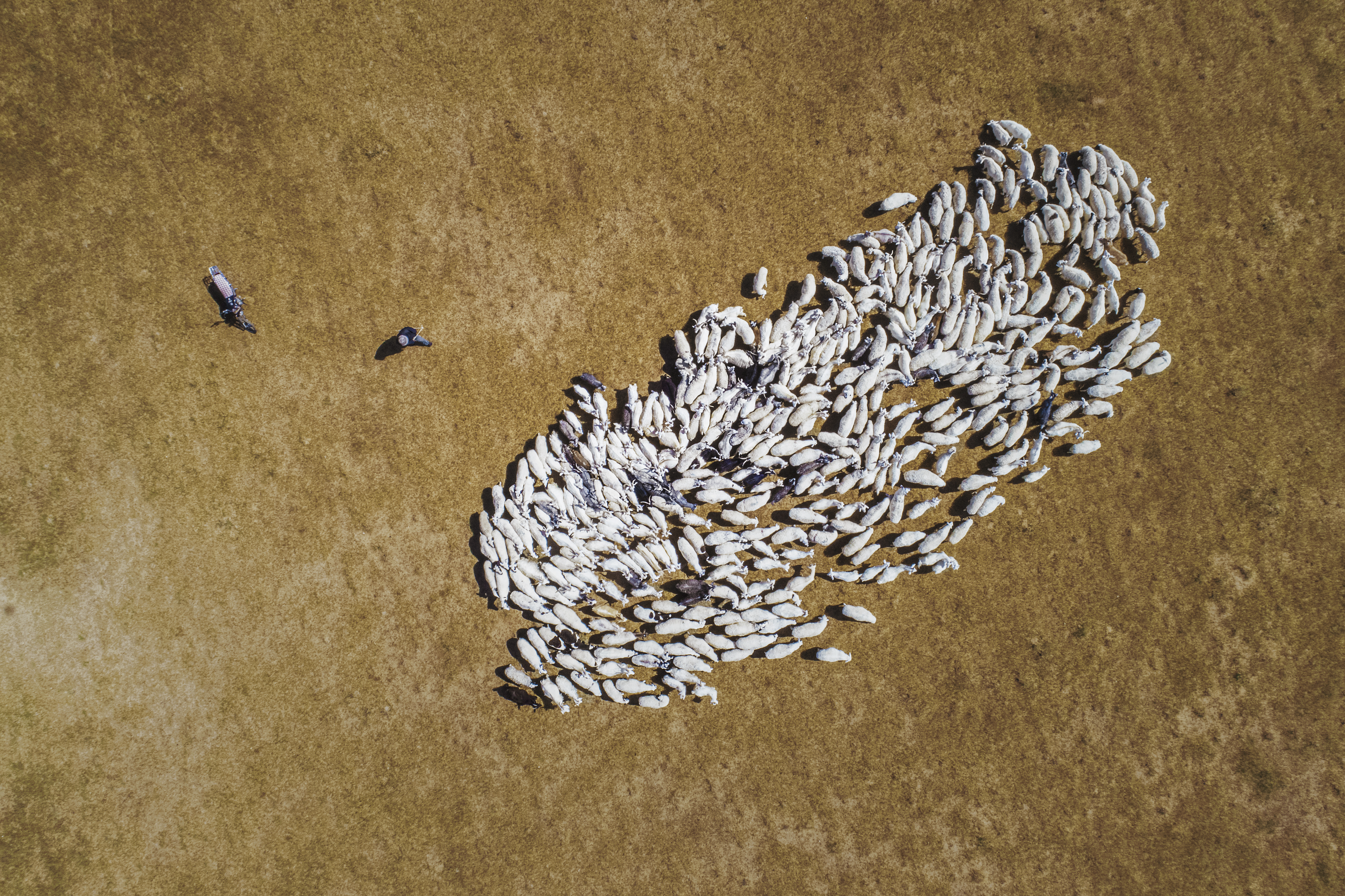
Aerial view of a flock of sheep in China with shepherd and motorbike

Shepherding in China dates back thousands of years. Traditional Chinese shepherds played a vital role in the country's agrarian society, tending to flocks of sheep and goats in various regions. These herders were responsible for not only ensuring the well-being of their animals but also safeguarding them from natural predators such as wolves and protecting them from theft.

Shepherding in ancient China was often a communal effort, with families or communities collectively managing their herds. These communities developed techniques and methods to graze their flocks in the vast and varied landscapes of China, from the high plateaus of Tibet to the fertile plains of the central and eastern regions. The shepherds employed their knowledge of the land and the behavior of their animals to select optimal grazing grounds and water sources.

Traditional Chinese shepherds used tools and equipment suited to their specific regions and needs. In the north, where winters could be harsh, they often relied on yurts or portable shelters to protect themselves and their livestock from the cold. In the more temperate and arable southern regions, shepherds utilized different strategies for grazing and protection.

Shepherding practices in China have evolved over the centuries, adapting to changes in agricultural and pastoral systems. With the modernization of agriculture and the growth of urbanization, the traditional role of shepherds has declined significantly in many parts of China. However, there are still regions, particularly in remote and mountainous areas, where shepherds continue to maintain their traditional way of life, preserving the ancient practices and knowledge that have been passed down through generations.

In recent years, there has been a renewed interest in sustainable and eco-friendly agriculture in China, leading to efforts to preserve and revitalize traditional shepherding practices. Some initiatives aim to support and empower local shepherds, recognizing the cultural and environmental importance of their role in maintaining China's pastoral landscapes.

=== Australia and New Zealand ===
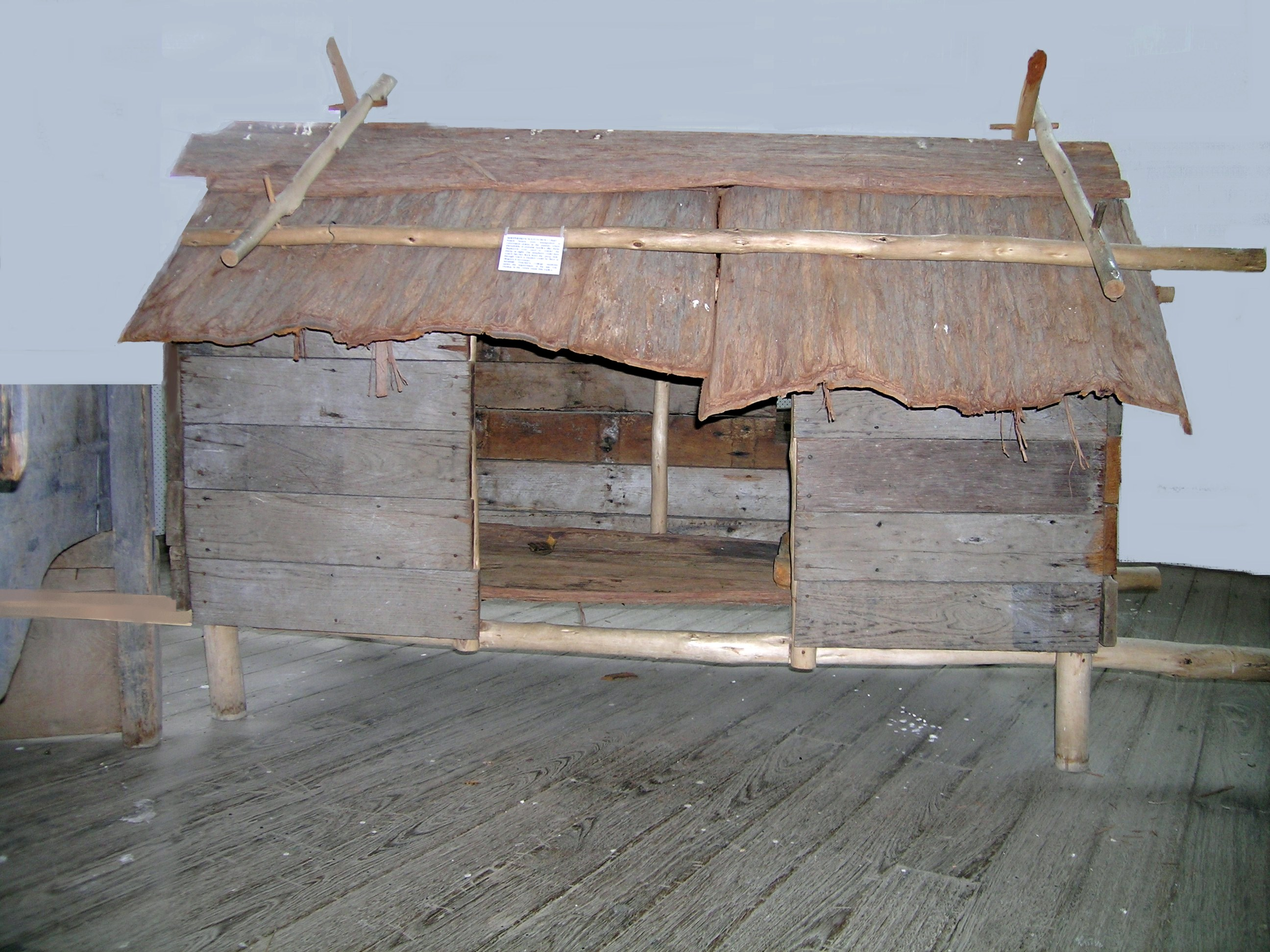
Shepherd's watch box, New South Wales

European exploration led to the spread of sheep around the world, and shepherding became especially important in Australia and New Zealand where there was great pastoral expansion. In Australia squatters spread beyond the Nineteen Counties of New South Wales to elsewhere, taking over vast holdings called properties and now stations.

Once driven overland to these properties, sheep were pastured in large unfenced runs. There, they required constant supervision. Shepherds were employed to keep the sheep from straying too far, to keep the mobs as healthy as possible and to prevent attacks from dingoes and introduced predators such as feral dogs and foxes. Lambing time further increased the shepherd's responsibilities.

Shepherding was an isolated, lonely job that was firstly given to assigned convict servants. The accommodation was usually poor and the food was lacking in nutrition, leading to dysentery and scurvy. When free labour was more readily available others took up this occupation. Some shepherds were additionally brought to Australia on the ships that carried sheep and were contracted to caring for them on their arrival in the colony. Sheep owners complained about the inefficiency of shepherds and the shepherds' fears of getting lost in the bush.

Typically sheep were watched by shepherds during the day, and by a hut-keeper during the night. Shepherds took the sheep out to graze before sunrise and returned them to brush-timber yards at sunset. The hut-keeper usually slept in a movable shepherd's watch box placed near the yard in order to deter attacks on the sheep. Dogs were also often chained close by to warn of any impending danger to the sheep or shepherd by dingoes or natives.

In 1839 the usual wage for a shepherd was about AU£50 per year, plus weekly rations of 12 pounds (5.4 kg) meat, 10 pounds (4.5 kg) flour, 2 pounds (0.91 kg) sugar and 4 ounces (110 g) tea. The wage during the depression of the 1840s dropped to £20 a year.

During the 1850s many shepherds left to try their luck on the goldfields causing acute labour shortages in the pastoral industry. This labour shortage leads to the widespread practice of fencing properties, which in turn reduced the demand for shepherds. Over 95% of New South Wales sheep were grazing in paddocks by the mid-1880s. An 1890s census of fencing in New South Wales recorded that 2.6 million kilometres of fencing had been erected there with a contemporary cost of A$3 billion. Boundary riders and stockmen replaced shepherds working on foot, who have not been employed in Australia and New Zealand since the start of the 20th century.

== Religion ==
Dumuzid, later known as Tammuz, was an important rural deity in ancient Mesopotamian religion, who was revered as the patron god of shepherds. In his role as Dumuzid sipad ("Dumuzid the Shepherd"), he was believed to be the provider of milk, which was a rare, seasonal commodity in ancient Sumer due to the fact that it could not easily be stored without spoiling. Under this same title, Dumuzid was thought to have been the fifth antediluvian king of the Sumerian city-state of Bad-tibira. In the Sumerian poem Inanna Prefers the Farmer, Dumuzid competes with the farmer Enkimdu for the affection of the goddess Inanna and ultimately wins her favor. Ancient Near Eastern peoples associated Dumuzid with the springtime, when the land was fertile and abundant, but, during the summer months, when the land was dry and barren, it was thought that Dumuzid had "died".

Metaphorically, the term "shepherd" is used for God, especially in the Judeo-Christian tradition (e.g. Psalm 23, Ezekiel 34), and in Christianity especially for Jesus, who called himself the Good Shepherd. The Ancient Israelites were a pastoral people and there were many shepherds among them. It may also be worth noting that many biblical figures were shepherds, among them the patriarchs Abraham and Jacob, the twelve tribes, the prophet Moses, King David, and the Old Testament prophet Amos, who was a shepherd in the rugged area around Tekoa. In the New Testament, angels announced the birth of Jesus to shepherds.

The same metaphor is also applied to priests, with Roman Catholic, Church of Sweden and other Lutheran, and Anglican bishops having the shepherd's crook among their insignia (see also Lycidas). In both cases, the implication is that the faithful are the "flock" who have to be tended. This is in part inspired by Jesus's injunctions to Peter, "Feed my sheep", which is the source of the pastoral image in Lycidas. The term "Pastor", originally the Latin word for "shepherd", is now used solely to denote the clergy of most Christian denominations.

The Good Shepherd is one of the thrusts of Biblical scripture. This illustration encompasses many ideas, including God's care for his people. The tendency of humans to put themselves into danger's way and their inability to guide and take care of themselves apart from the direct power and leading of God is also reinforced with the metaphor of sheep in need of a shepherd.

According to Muhammad, the Prophet of Islam, every messenger of God had the occupation of being a shepherd at one point in their lives, as he himself was as a young man. Narrated by Jabir bin Abdullah: We were with Allah's Apostle picking the fruits of the Arak trees, and Allah's Apostle (peace and blessings of Allah be to him) said, "Pick the black fruit, for it is the best." The companions asked, "Were you a shepherd?" He replied, "There was no prophet who was not a shepherd." (Sahih Bukhari, Chapter 'Prophets', Volume 4, Book 55, Hadith 618) This includes Jesus, Moses, Abraham, and all other prophets according to Islam. Also, 'shepherd' used as a metaphor of leadership and responsibilities that comes with it. A hadith narrated from Ibn Umar says that Muhammad says, "All of you are shepherds and every one of you is responsible for his herd. A leader is a shepherd, a man is the shepherd over his family, and a woman is the shepherd over her husband's house and his children. So all of you are shepherds, and every one of you is responsible for his herd."

One of the gentle aspects of the Hindu deity Shiva is called Pashupati, translated as, "the lord of the animals", though more commonly associated with cattle. As Pashupati, the deity is metaphorically regarded to be the herdsman or the shepherd of the souls of men.

Sikhism also has many mentions of shepherd tales. There are many relevant quotations, such as "We are the cattle, God almighty is our shepherd."

This concept has also been used frequently by critics of organized religion to present an unflattering portrayal.

== In popular culture ==
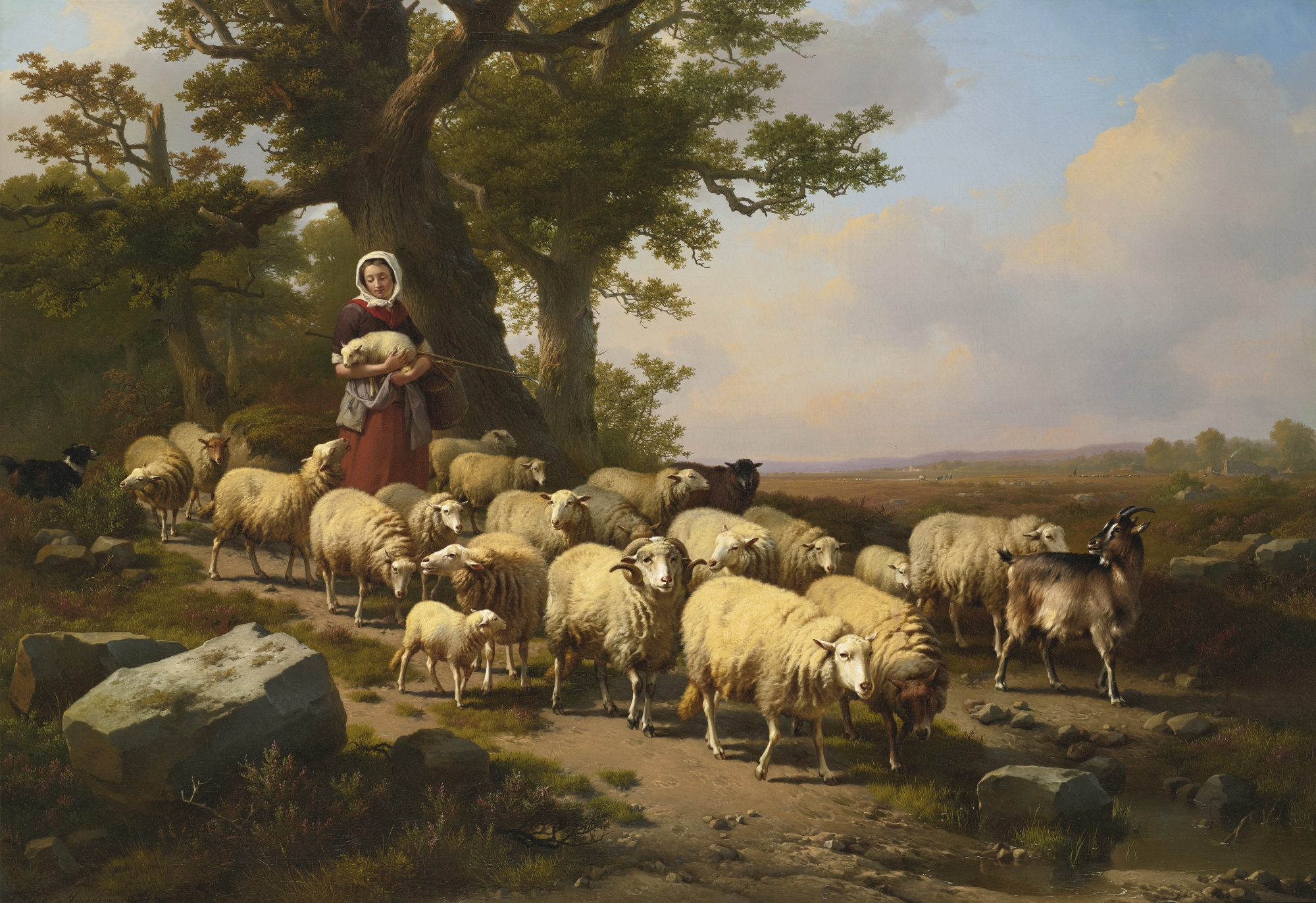
A Shepherdess with her Flock by Verboeckhoven

The shepherd, with other such figures as the goatherd, is the inhabitant of idealized Arcadia, which is an idyllic and natural countryside. These works are, indeed, called pastoral, after the term for herding. The first surviving instances are the Idylls of Theocritus, and the Eclogues of Virgil, both of which inspired many imitators such as Edmund Spenser's The Shepheardes Calender. The shepherds of the pastoral are often heavily conventional and bear little relation to the actual work of shepherds.

In the poem "The passionate shepherd to his love", by Christopher Marlowe, a shepherd is depicted as a partaker of rural paradise, and capable of giving things worth more than that a town resident could give.

Many tales involving foundlings portray them being rescued by shepherds: Oedipus, Romulus and Remus, the title characters of Longus's Daphnis and Chloe, and The Winter's Tale by William Shakespeare. These characters are often of much higher social status than the characters who save and raise them, the shepherds themselves being secondary characters. Similarly, the heroes and heroines of fairy tales written by the précieuses often appeared as shepherds and shepherdesses in pastoral settings, but these figures were royal or noble, and their simple setting does not cloud their innate nobility.

== Gallery ==
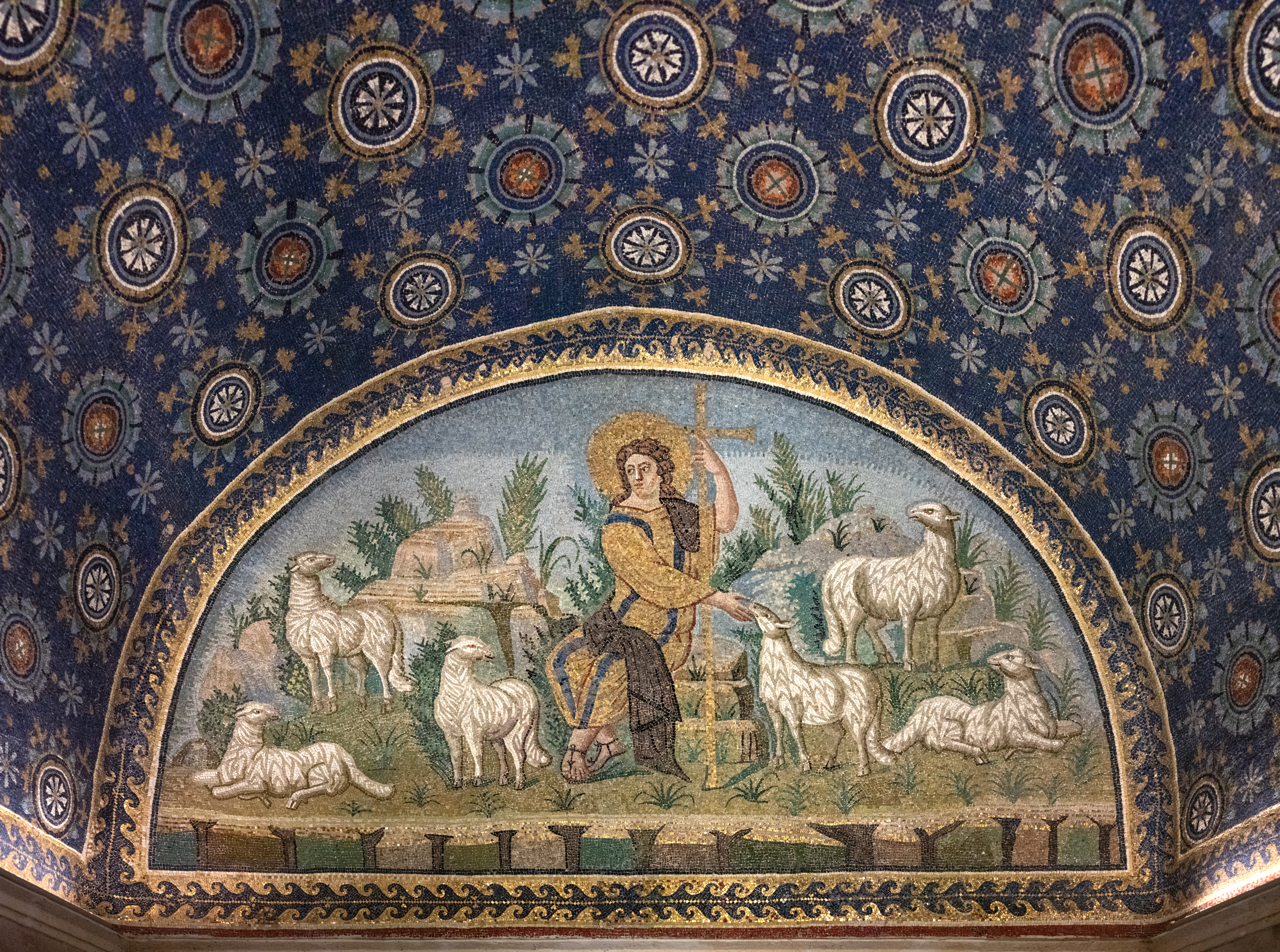
Fifth-century Ravenna mosaic illustrating the concept of The Good Shepherd

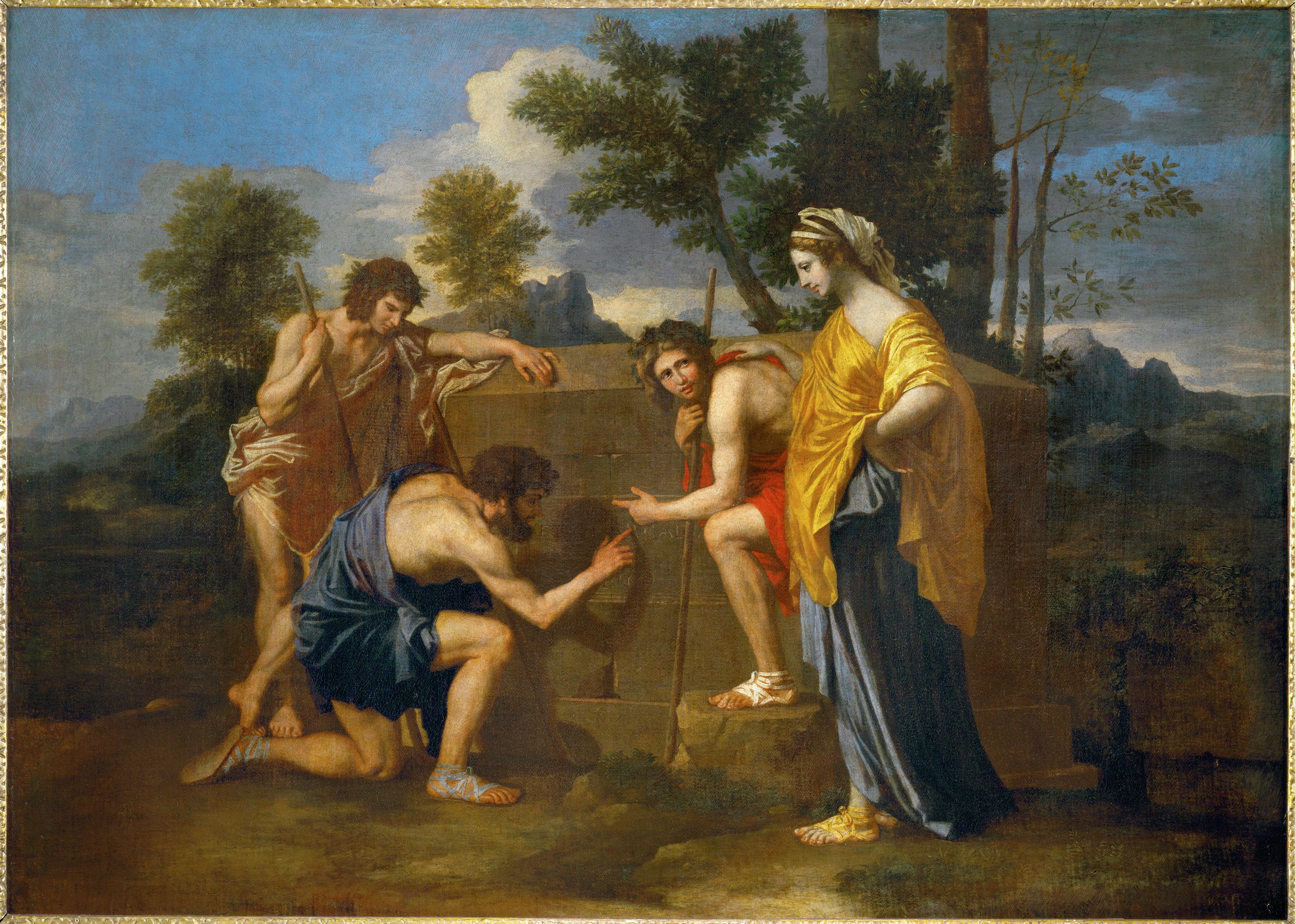
Les Bergers d'Arcadie (The Shepherds of Arcadia) by Nicolas Poussin

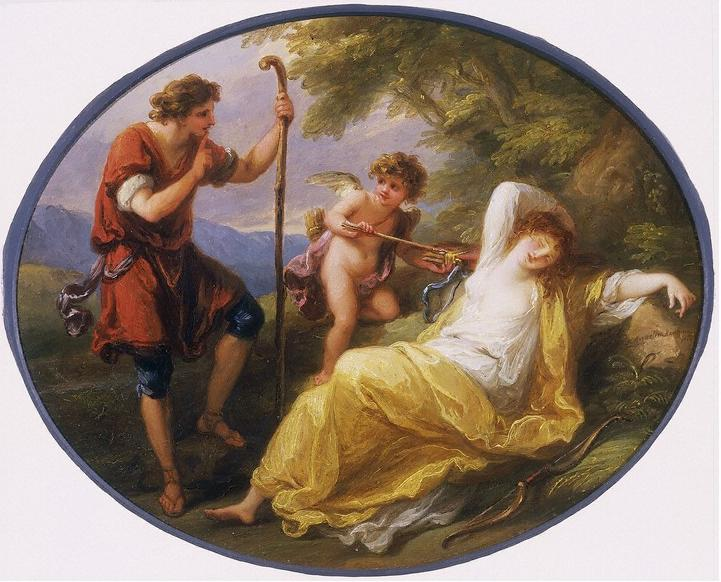
A Sleeping Nymph Watched by a Shepherd by Angelica Kauffman, about 1780, V&A Museum no. 23–1886

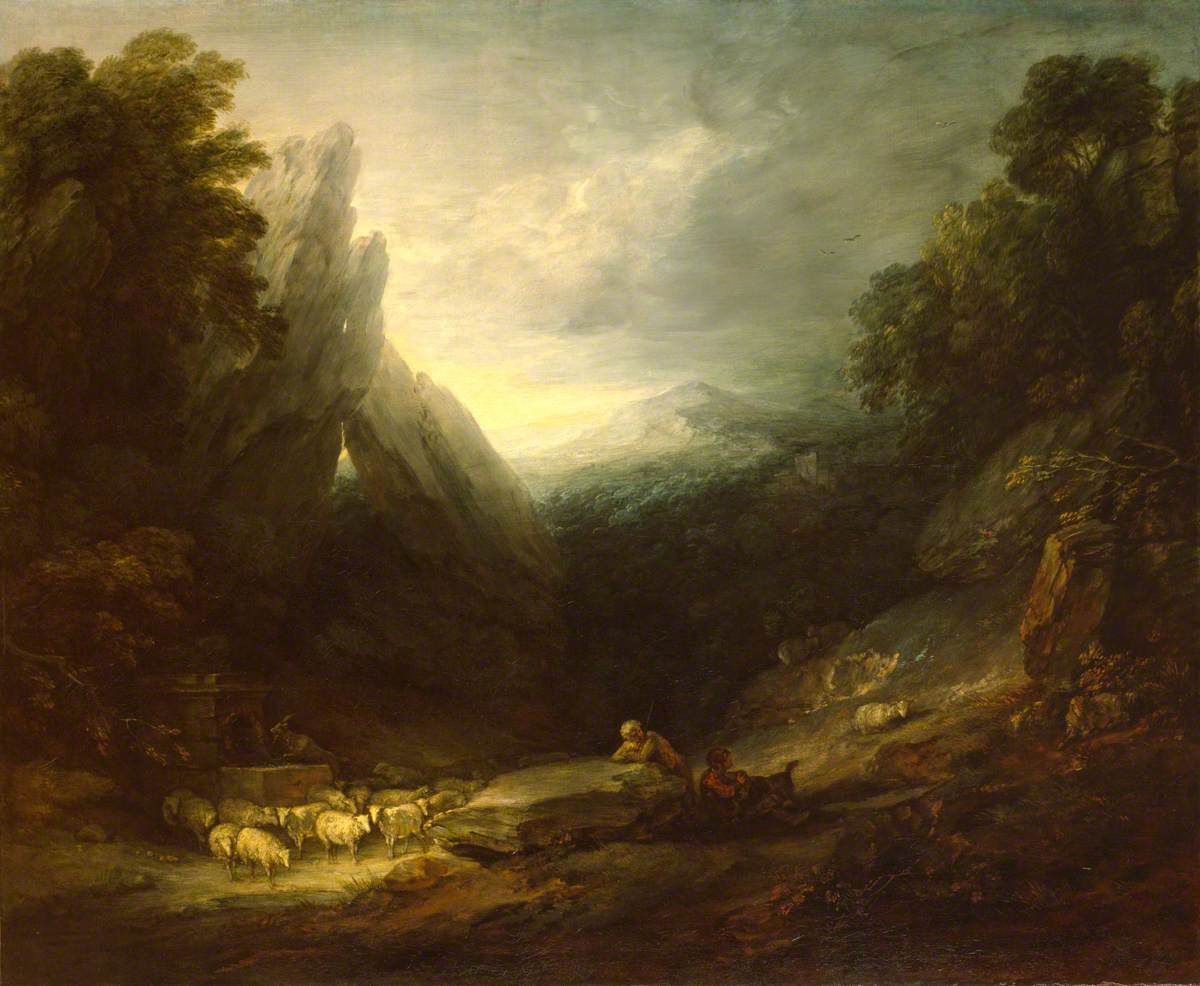
Romantic Landscape with Sheep at a Spring by Thomas Gainsborough, 1783

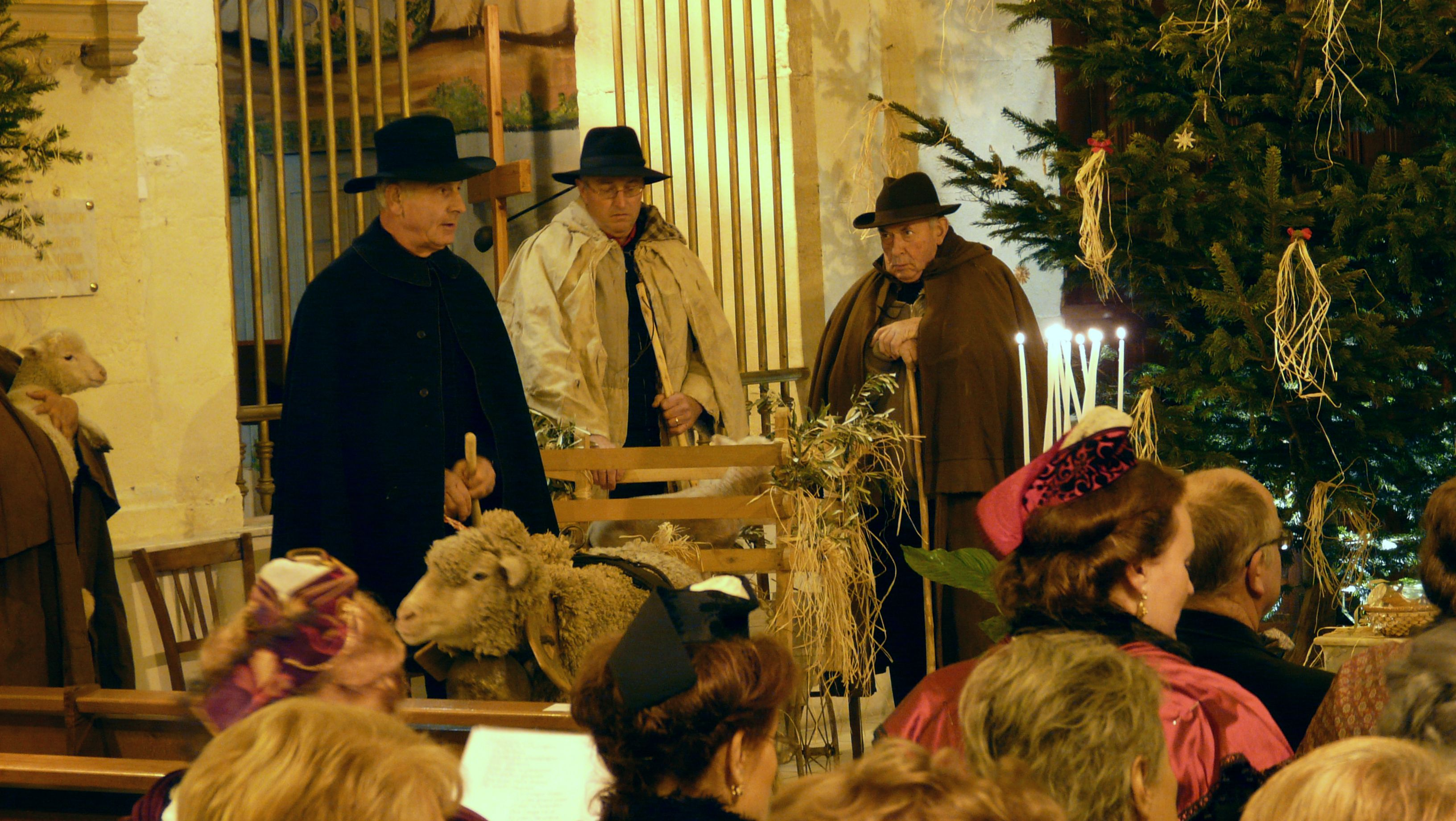
Traditional midnight mass with shepherds in Provence

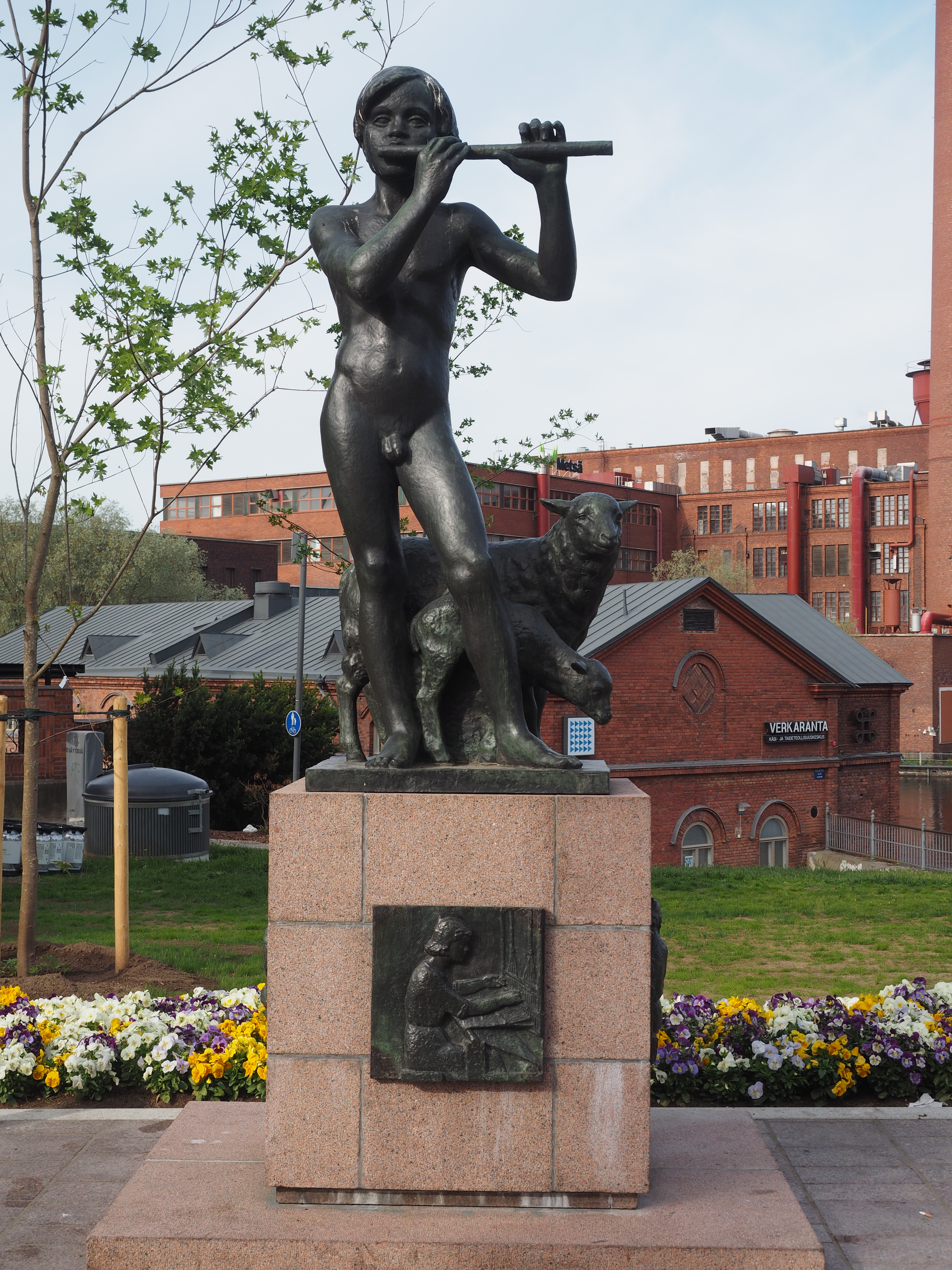
The Shepherd sculpture at the Koskipuisto park in Tampere, Finland

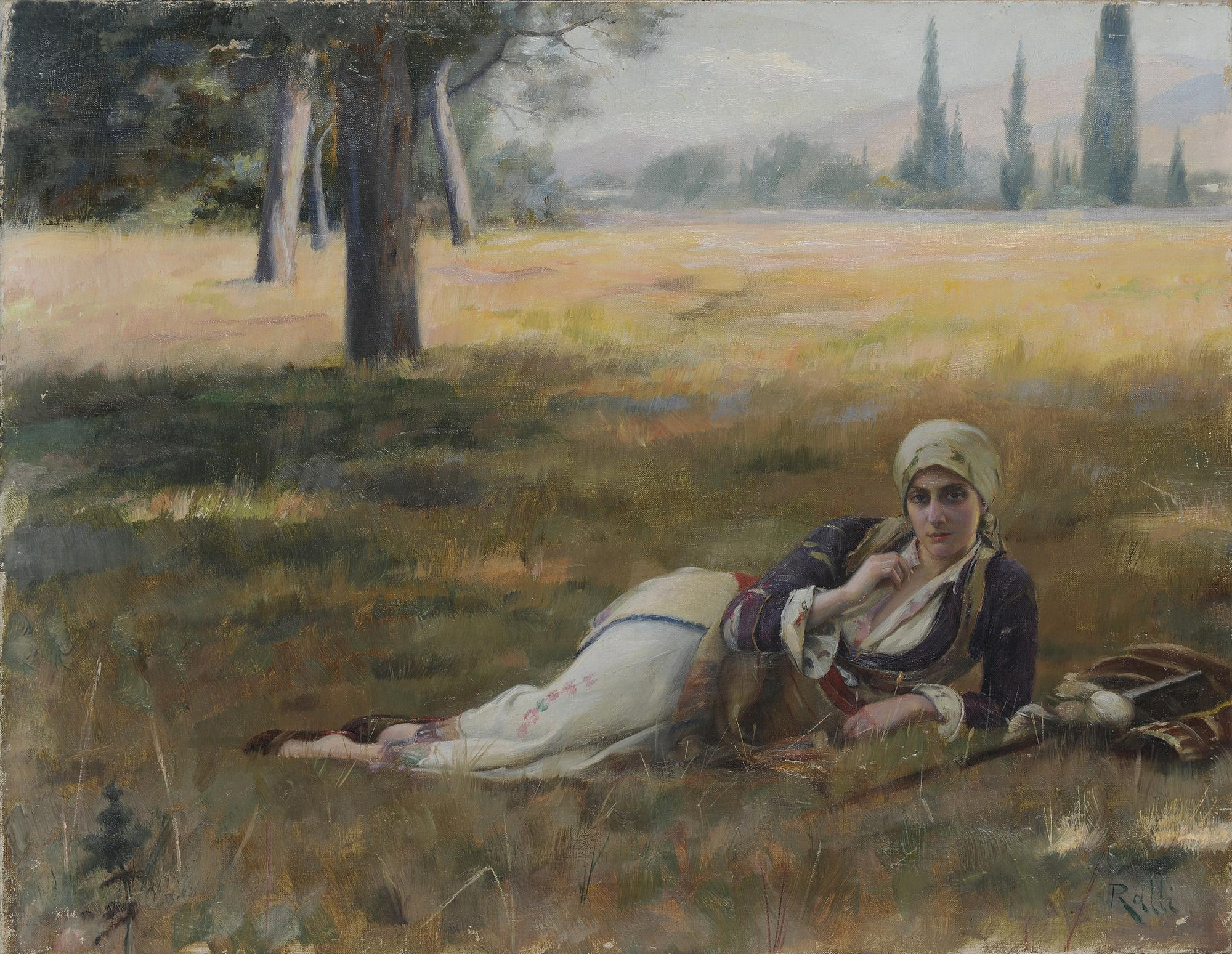
The Shepherdess by Théodore Jacques Ralli c. 1873 and 1909, a shepherdess in a small Greek village.

== See also ==
- Sheep wagon
- Shepherd's crook
- Shepherd's hat
- Shepherd's hut
- Animal husbandry
  - Pastoralism
  - Transhumance
  - Sheep farming
- Herder
  - Goatherd
  - Swineherd
  - Reindeer herding
- Sheep dog
  - Herding dog
  - Livestock guardian dog
