= Alexander Healy (sheepman) =

American sheepman and livestock financier (1881-1958)

- Alex Healy Sr., 1930s
- Born: Alexander Healy; 1881; Ogden, Utah, United States
- Died: 1958 (aged 76–77)
- Education: Massachusetts Institute of Technology
- Occupations: Sheep rancher, livestock financier
- Known for: Healy Brothers sheep operation; Washakie Livestock Loan Company; LU Sheep Company
- Spouse: Edith Sampson Holden
- Children: 4

Alexander Healy Sr. (1881-1958), often called "Alex" or "Alec" Healy, was an American sheepman in northern Wyoming. He was a partner in the Healy Brothers Sheep Company based near Buffalo, a large sheep operation that ended in 1919. In 1922 he settled his family in Worland, Wyoming, where he built up a new sheep enterprise, established a livestock financing business and later acquired the LU Sheep Company.

== Early life and education ==
Healy was born in 1881 in Ogden, Utah, the second son of Patrick Healy Sr. and Mary Ann Patterson Healy. His father was an Irish-born sheepman who established one of the largest sheep operations in the American Intermountain West with his brother-in-law, Adam Patterson. The Healy and Patterson enterprise extended across Oregon, Idaho, Utah and Wyoming.

Healy graduated from the Massachusetts Institute of Technology in 1903 with a degree in mining engineering. As a senior at MIT, he was president of the Mining Engineering Society. Hoping to find suitable mining work, he went out to Nevada for a couple of years. According to his son Dan Healy's oral history, Alec Healy worked there as a "pick-and-shovel man" because he could not find employment as an engineer. He then returned to the family sheep business in Wyoming.

== Healy Brothers ==
In 1904, Patrick Healy Jr., Alec's elder brother, bought out his uncle Adam Patterson's interests in the sheep operation at Buffalo. Alec acquired his father's interests in the business in 1906, and the brothers operated as the Healy Brothers. By 1911, they were running around 45,000 sheep. They made seasonal movements of sheep between winter and summer ranges. Winter ranges were near Buffalo but sheep were also trailed to the Big Horn Basin. The Bighorn Mountains were the summer range.

Alec Healy

In 1911 Healy married Edith Sampson Holden, a native of Boston and a descendant of Mayflower Pilgrims. They had been friends since Healy's days at MIT and by the time they married were already rather old for that era: Alec was 30 and Edith was 32. The couple lived in Buffalo, although Alec's work often required him to spend much of his time away from home, out on the range, checking up on sheep camps and attending to other business concerns. Letters written by Edith during this period, later collected and edited by their granddaughter Cathy Healy in An Improbable Pioneer, describe many details of the family's sheep operation in early twentieth-century Wyoming.

Although wartime demand raised wool and livestock prices during World War I, the Healy Brothers’ operation struggled financially. As many sheepherders from the French Basque Country were serving in the war, labor shortages resulted in poor lamb crops. Winter feed was expensive, and with the demand of the Healy Brothers' large flock exceeding local supply, had to be transported in a roundabout way by rail from Worland. Following their father’s death in May 1918, the brothers decided to end their partnership. Patrick Healy Jr.’s appointment to replace his father as president of the Commercial National Bank of Ogden helped prompt the decision. They began selling their sheep while prices remained high and by 1919 had sold all but one band of about 1,200 head. These remaining sheep interests were managed and expanded for several years by Harold Pearson, near Ten Sleep.

Many advised the brothers not to sell out, but it seems that they did so just in time. The winter of 1919-1920 brought severe blizzards, livestock deaths and a collapse in livestock prices across Wyoming and the West. Sheep that had been worth $25 per head in the preceding autumn fell to around $4 by the spring of 1920. Where once wool had been in high demand, there was now a glut of wool on the market. The combination of high feeding costs and falling market values devastated many livestock operators in the region.

== The move to Worland ==
Healy and family left Buffalo in 1921. After a short period in Denver, the family moved to Worland in 1922. By that year, Worland was seen to be a promising agricultural and commercial center, supported by extensive irrigation for farms, a railroad connection, an established livestock industry and expanding oil development. It was also the hub of Wyoming's sugar industry. Healy had been a subscriber to the Worland Grit newspaper since 1916. In July, 1920, the Grit reported that Alec and Edith Healy were visiting Worland from Buffalo, and that in addition to enjoying the newspaper Mrs. Healy was "a booster for the Big Horn River valley."

While in Denver, Healy had acquired shares in the First National Bank of Worland and became its executive vice-president. The bank's president was Herman B. Gates, Wyoming's former state Treasurer and a man who had lived in Worland since 1906. The bank specialized in loans to farmers and ranchers.

Healy had become quite familiar with the Worland and Ten Sleep area over the years through wintering sheep on that side of the mountain, buying hay in the Big Horn Basin for the flock on the Buffalo side and conducting other business. The Worland area was already known for its prodigious crop of alfalfa hay. In addition to feasting on native grasses and even sagebrush, sheep in the Big Horn Basin can also graze on sugar beet tops remaining in harvested fields during the late fall. Beet tops can also be stored to provide feed through the winter.

Healy, 1925

By 1922 the United States experienced a "decided revival" in wool prices. Once settled in Worland, Healy got back into the sheep business in a big way, building on the flock that had been managed by Pearson. As an illustration of this, an October 1925 news article, datelined Helena, Montana, reports that "Alex Healy of Worland, Wyo., one of the largest sheep producers in that state, has purchased 6,000 lambs" as well as "a bunch of purebred Hampshire blackfaced ewes and lambs at Bozeman for breeding purposes." Healy stated that he would initially feed the lambs on beet tops.

Along with the other sheepherders, Healy's young sons, Alec Jr. and Dan, spent their summers up on the mountain with the sheep.

A member of the Republican Party, Healy served two terms representing Washakie County in the Wyoming House of Representatives. For the Seventeenth Legislative Session (1923), Committees on which he served were those of the Ways and Means, Lands and Irrigation, Bridges and Highways and Public Utilities. In the Eighteenth Legislative Session (1925), Healy was unanimously elected Temporary Speaker of the House. Committees on which he served in that session were those of the Ways and Means and Corporations, the latter of which he was Chairman. In both sessions, Healy introduced several bills and cast an Aye vote on numerous bills that passed into law.

== Washakie Livestock Loan Company ==
After the First National Bank was acquired by the Farmers State Bank in 1924, Healy established the Washakie Livestock Loan Company in Worland. The company provided credit to sheep and cattle operators at an interest rate of 4.5 percent, substantially below the prevailing rates of 10-12 percent. Its loans could also be discounted and guaranteed through the Federal Intermediate Credit Bank.

Although the stock market was booming in 1929, prices were rising rapidly, ordinary Americans were buying shares and speculation was increasingly financed with borrowed money. Healy's analysis of the situation led him to conclude that holding money in stocks had become too risky. Once again, his timing was very good. "He sold all of his stocks before the market crashed and thus had money to lend during the Great Depression."

The economic collapse that began in 1929 severely affected the company's borrowers. Loans had been made against sheep valued at $12 per head, with advances of up to $8. When sheep prices fell to around $4, the collateral was worth considerably less than the outstanding debt. At the same time, many operators were losing money on their annual livestock operations.

Healy worked to keep borrowers in business during the Great Depression, seeking arrangements that would allow ranchers to repay their debts over time and retain their stock. The account by Kilker and Koch describes his efforts to assist struggling livestock operators during the collapse of sheep and wool prices and the resulting financial distress.

Healy's grandson, Tim Healy, recounted an anecdote told him by his father, Alec Jr., who witnessed the event. Alec Sr. was sitting in his office when a worried-looking rancher came into the room, tossed a piece of paper on the desk and said, "Well, it's all yours, I can't make it." Healy handed him back the paper and said "What are you, a quitter?" To the man's relief, Healy gave him a reprieve on his loan.

Healy continued working with ranchers so they could eventually repay him. The prolonged strain of this work contributed to a heart attack, and when he recovered he began liquidating the loan company to the newly established Production Credit Association in 1936. This was a farmer-owned lending cooperative established under the federal Farm Credit System to provide short- and intermediate-term loans to farmers and livestock ranchers.

== LU Sheep Company ==
Alec Healy (right), LU manager George Bain (left), and John Farquerson (center), 1935

In the mid-1930s, Healy began buying shares in the LU Sheep Company, a livestock enterprise founded by Scottish immigrant brothers Dave and James Dickie in 1899. Interestingly, Patrick Healy Sr. had provided the financial support to help the brothers get started with their ranch. The company had fallen into financial difficulty after Dave Dickie used substantial personal resources to repay depositors of a bank he owned in Thermopolis, which had failed in 1933, honorably seeking to ensure that they recovered their savings. Until 1934, federal deposit insurance was not available to protect bank depositors.

After Dave Dickie passed away in 1935, Healy acquired a controlling interest in the LU Sheep Company and soon restored it to financial health. Healy's son Dan took over management of the ranch in 1952, and it remains in the Healy family. The operation subsequently became known as the LU Ranch and in the 1980s shifted its main focus from sheep to cattle production.

== Family and legacy ==
Healy family in Worland, circa 1929

In addition to their sons Alec Jr. and Dan, in 1924 Alec and Edith adopted two daughters, Eileen and Helen, from the Cathedral Home orphanage in Laramie, Wyoming.

After the family moved to Worland, Edith Healy became active in the Girl Scouts, organizing troops throughout the Big Horn Basin. She later held state and regional leadership positions and served on the organization's national board for eight years. She was also an accomplished violinist and frequently performed at family and community gatherings. Edith died of cancer in 1950. After she died, Alec donated funds to build a "little house" in her memory, where Worland's Girl Scouts could meet. This building is still known as the "Edith Healy Little House."

After the Healy Brothers Sheep Company concluded, Alec Healy worked in banking and then in livestock finance, extending low-interest credit to ranchers during the Great Depression. His work helped many struggling ranchers repay loans and retain their assets. He also developed another large sheep enterprise, and later acquired and restored the LU Sheep Company, which remained in the Healy family and continues as the LU Ranch. Edith's Girl Scout leadership and Alec's involvement in livestock finance and ranching were significant aspects of the family's contributions to the Big Horn Basin. Healy died in 1958 at the age of 77.
