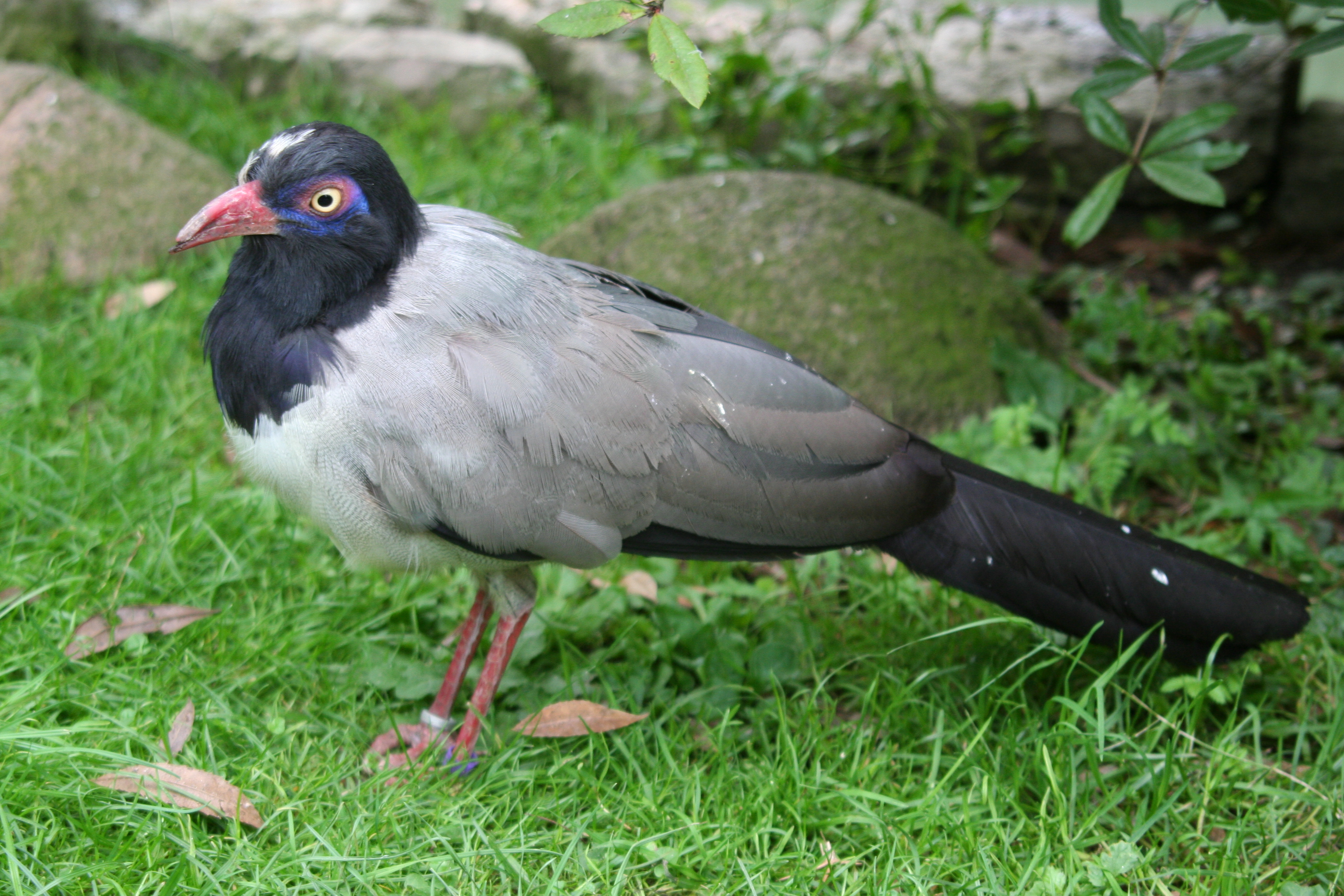

Conservation status
- Endangered (IUCN 3.1)

Scientific classification
- Kingdom: Animalia
- Phylum: Chordata
- Class: Aves
- Order: Cuculiformes
- Family: Cuculidae
- Genus: Carpococcyx
- Species: C. renauldi

Binomial name
- Carpococcyx renauldi Oustalet, 1896

= Coral-billed ground cuckoo =

Species of bird

The coral-billed ground cuckoo (Carpococcyx renauldi), also known as Renauld's ground cuckoo, is a large, terrestrial species of cuckoo in the family Cuculidae, found in Cambodia, Laos, Thailand, and Vietnam.

== Taxonomy and systematics ==
The coral-billed ground cuckoo was first described by French zoologist Émile Oustalet in 1895 as Carpococcyx renauldi. Oustalet placed the species in the genus Carpococcyx, noting its physical distinction from the other members of the genus (The Bornean ground cuckoo and the Sumatran ground cuckoo). The species was eponymously named renauldi for R.D. Renauld, a missionary who had collected the specimen's observed by Oustalet from Vietnam's Quảng Trị province.

== Description ==
The coral-billed ground cuckoo can grow up to 56-70 centimeters (22-28 inches) in length. One captive specimen was reported to weigh 400 grams (0.88 pounds) when close to being fully grown. Adults are sexually monomorphic. Their head, neck, upper breast, primaries, and tail are a glossy violet-black color, with a bare patch of red and violet-colored skin around the eyes. A white band sits below the neck, with the lower breast, flanks, belly, and undertail coverts being primarily white. Their back, rump, and secondaries are primarily grey, with the tips of the secondaries being violet. Their bill and legs are red. Juveniles have a primarily brown head, with a bare patch of grey skin around the eyes. Their back is dark grey with rufous barring, and the secondaries and upper wing coverts are gray with rufous tips. Their belly, chin, are grey, with the upper breast being grey to rufous-brown and a black tail. Their bill and legs are blackish-brown.

== Distribution and habitat ==
The coral-billed ground cuckoo is found throughout Cambodia, Laos, Thailand, and Vietnam. Their natural habitat is broad-leaf evergreen forest with dense vegetation and ground cover.

== Behavior and ecology ==
The coral-billed ground cuckoo is primarily ground dwelling, occasionally perching in low trees. They are noted to rarely fly and are skittish, often fleeing from disturbance. They are omnivorous, feeding on insects, small reptiles, small mammals, and have been reported to consume food refuse from restaurants in Thailand. Captive specimens have been reported to consume meat, dead mice, baby rats, worms, insects, bread, and boiled maize.

=== Nesting and Reproduction ===
The coral-billed ground cuckoo nests in trees, creating a nest of large sticks; In captivity, some have been reported to create cup-like stick nests on both the ground and in trees. Eggs are laid from May to August, with both parents incubating for around 18-19 days; Both parents similarly feed and protect the young, with the young leaving the nest after 50-60 days. Specimens have been noted to adapt well to captive conditions, and have successfully reproduced in captivity.

== Conservation and threats ==
As of 2024, the species is listed as Endangered by the IUCN, with habitat degradation, habitat loss, and bycatch of industrial drift-fence cable snaring noted as major threats. The species has also been threatened by traditional hunting and capture for live trade. On one occasion, a nest was reported to have failed as a result of predation by a pig-tailed macaque.
