= Sunda ground-cuckoo =

The Sunda ground-cuckoos are two large species of terrestrial cuckoos that until recently often were considered conspecific:

- Bornean ground-cuckoo (Carpococcyx radiceus)
- Sumatran ground-cuckoo (Carpococcyx viridis)
