= Winter of 1886–87 in the United States =

Harsh season in North America

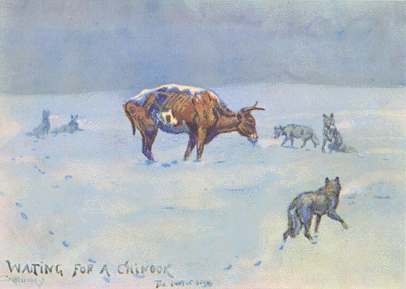
Waiting for a Chinook, by C.M. Russell. Overgrazing and harsh winters were factors that brought an end to the age of the Open Range

The winter of 1886–87 was extremely harsh for much of continental North America, especially the United States. Although it affected other regions in the country, it is most known for its effects on the Western United States and its cattle industry. This winter marked the end of the open range era and led to the entire reorganization of ranching.

== History ==
The summer of 1886 had been unusually hot and dry, with numerous prairie fires, and water sources often dried up. In the fall, signs of a harsh winter ahead began to appear. Birds began flying south earlier than usual, beavers were seen collecting more wood than normal for the winter ahead, and some cattle grew thicker and shaggier coats.

The first snows fell earlier than usual, in November, and were reported as some of the worst in memory. Extreme cold killed humans and animals. Some people got lost near their houses and froze to death very near their front doors. The winter weather even reached the West Coast, with snowfall of 3.7 inches in downtown San Francisco setting an all-time record on February 5, 1887.

== Impact ==
Hundreds of thousands of cattle died in the Big Die-Up during the unusually cold and snowy winters of 1885–1886 and 1886–1887. The loss of livestock was not discovered until spring, when many cattle carcasses were spread across the fields and washed down streams. The few remaining cattle were in poor health, emaciated and suffering from frostbite. This resulted in the cattle being sold for much less, in some cases leading businesses to bankruptcy. "Many of them were big ranches that focused on short-term profits".

Future president Theodore Roosevelt's cattle ranch near Medora, Dakota Territory was among those hit hard by that winter. In a letter to his friend Henry Cabot Lodge, Roosevelt remarked "Well, we have had a perfect smashup all through the cattle country of the northwest. The losses are crippling. For the first time I have been utterly unable to enjoy a visit to my ranch. I shall be glad to get home."

== See also ==
- Drift fence
- January 1886 blizzard
- Overgrazing
- Pastoral farming

== Bibliography ==
- Ridings, Sam P. (1936). "XVII ~ The Cherokee Strip Livestock Association". The Chisholm Trail ~ A History of the World's Greatest Cattle Trail. Guthrie, Oklahoma: Co-Operative Publishing Company. pp. 266–268. ISBN 978-1632202666 – via Internet Archive.
- Briggs, Harold E. (1950). Frontiers of the Northwest: A History of the Upper Missouri Valley. New York, N.Y.: Peter Smith.
- Knowlton, Christopher (May 30, 2017). "XV ~ The Big Die-Up". Cattle Kingdom: The Hidden History of the Cowboy West. Houghton Mifflin Harcourt. pp. xvi–xix, 227–239. ISBN 978-0544369979.
