= January 1913 Atlantic coast storm =

Extratropical cyclone – eastern coast of the United States

Cyclone of January 3, 1913
Meteorological history
- Formed: January 3, 1913

Extratropical cyclone
- Highest winds: 140 mph (230 km/h)
- Lowest pressure: 955.0 hPa (mbar); 28.20 inHg

Overall effects
- Casualties: 7 (Schooner Future)
- Areas affected: New Jersey, New York, Pennsylvania, Virginia

The January 1913 Atlantic coast storm was a strong extratropical cyclone that affected the eastern coast of the United States on January 3, 1913. It resulted in heavy damage due to the high winds and produced record low pressure readings. The lowest confirmed barometric pressure reading, 955.0 mb (28.20 inHg), for a non-tropical system in the continental United States (CONUS) was recorded during this storm at Canton, New York. This broke the record low of this type set by the January 1886 Blizzard. The lowest pressure reading of this type was later equalled on March 7, 1932, at Block Island, Rhode Island. The next lowest record, 955.2 mb (28.21 inHg), was during the October 2010 North American storm complex on October 26, 2010, at Bigfork, Minnesota.

== Meteorological history ==
The storm formed suddenly on the night of January 2–3 and developed into a severe storm with destructive gales and record low pressures on January 3 over eastern Pennsylvania and Virginia. The high winds and low pressures continued over New Jersey, New York, and Massachusetts. It passed over Maine by the next morning.

Weather Bureau forecaster Scarr reported in The New York Times that the storm produced a record low pressure of 968.9 mb (28.61 inHg) and wind speeds of 90 mph (140 km/h) in New York City. He also said "the storm had been caused by several small depressions ... combining and forming a cyclone."

Philadelphia recorded its lowest pressure, 970.9 mb (28.67 inHg), for the month of January.

== Wind and related damage ==
The schooner Future, heading toward Washington, D.C., was heavily damaged by the storm. The captain and three crewmen were lost overboard. The rest were not rescued until January 6 by the Asuncion de Larrinaga, but three of them did not survive.

The Lillian, one of several open coal barges being towed by the tug Eli B. Conine in the North River, sunk near Battery Park in Manhattan.

Newport News and Norfolk, Virginia were without communications as the telephone and telegraph lines were down. There were reports of water in the James River resembling a tidal wave.

It blew over the steeple of the historic Readington Reformed Church in New Jersey.
