= Mabel Doss Day Lea =

American rancher and politician

Mabel Doss Day Lea (1856–1906) was a rancher, politician, and businesswoman. She owned and ran a large cattle ranch in Texas, the Day Cattle Ranch Company, and helped establish the New Mexico Military Institute with her husband. Lea served as the lady commissioner of the 1904 Louisiana Purchase Exposition in St. Louis and worked to encourage more people to move to Texas. She was inducted into the Texas Women's Hall of Fame. The Day Cattle Ranch Company had the largest fenced ranch in Texas upon the outbreak of the 1883 Fence Cutting War and she lobbied for a law to make fence cutting illegal, which was passed the following year.
