= Drift fence =

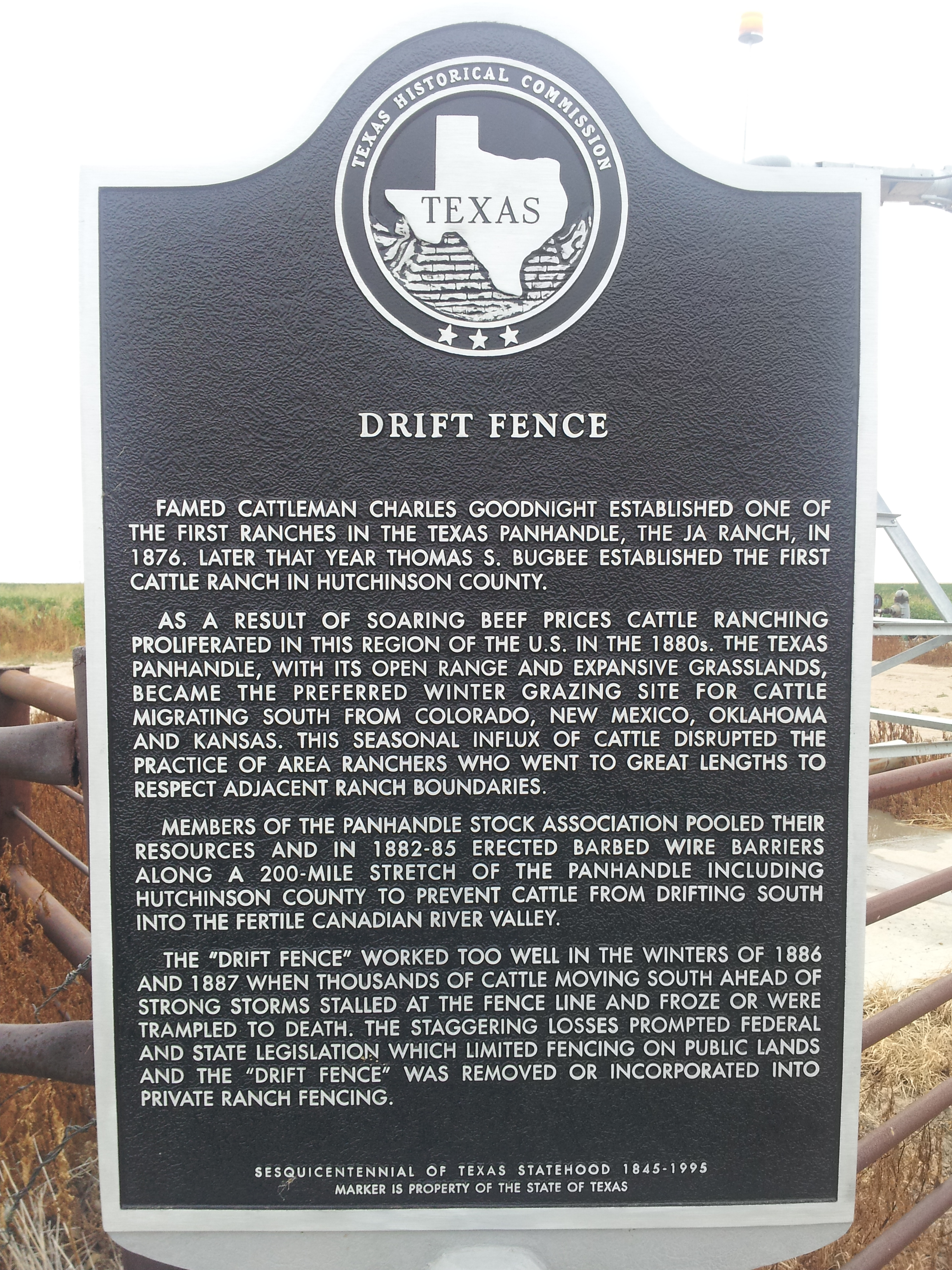
Texas Historical Marker, on Highway 207 north of Stinnett, for the Drift Fence

A drift fence is any long, continuous fence used to control the movement of animals in a particular open range, or to collect animals for research.

== Use ==
Drift fences were used in the Texas Panhandle from 1882 to 1887 to control "cattle drift"—the winter migration of livestock to warmer territory. Long sections of barbed wire fence were built by ranchers to keep the cattle from moving to the southern part of the state.

== Impact ==
This fence was disastrous for the animals during the winter of 1886–1887 in what was called the Big Die-Up. Deep snow covered the grasslands, and the fence prevented the herds from migrating to greener pastures. As a result, the cattle froze to death along the fences. Some 75 percent perished during the winter.

== Research Implications ==
Drift fences are a passive trapping system commonly used to sample both small and large vertebrae, most commonly used for Herpetofauna. This method is effective for capturing secretive, fossorial, and aquatic species, making it a valuable tool for biodiversity surveys and long-term monitoring. Drift fences can help reveal patterns in species activity, spatial distribution, and responses to environmental variables, supporting broader conservation and habitat management efforts.

== See also ==
- Charles Goodnight
- Fence Cutting Wars
