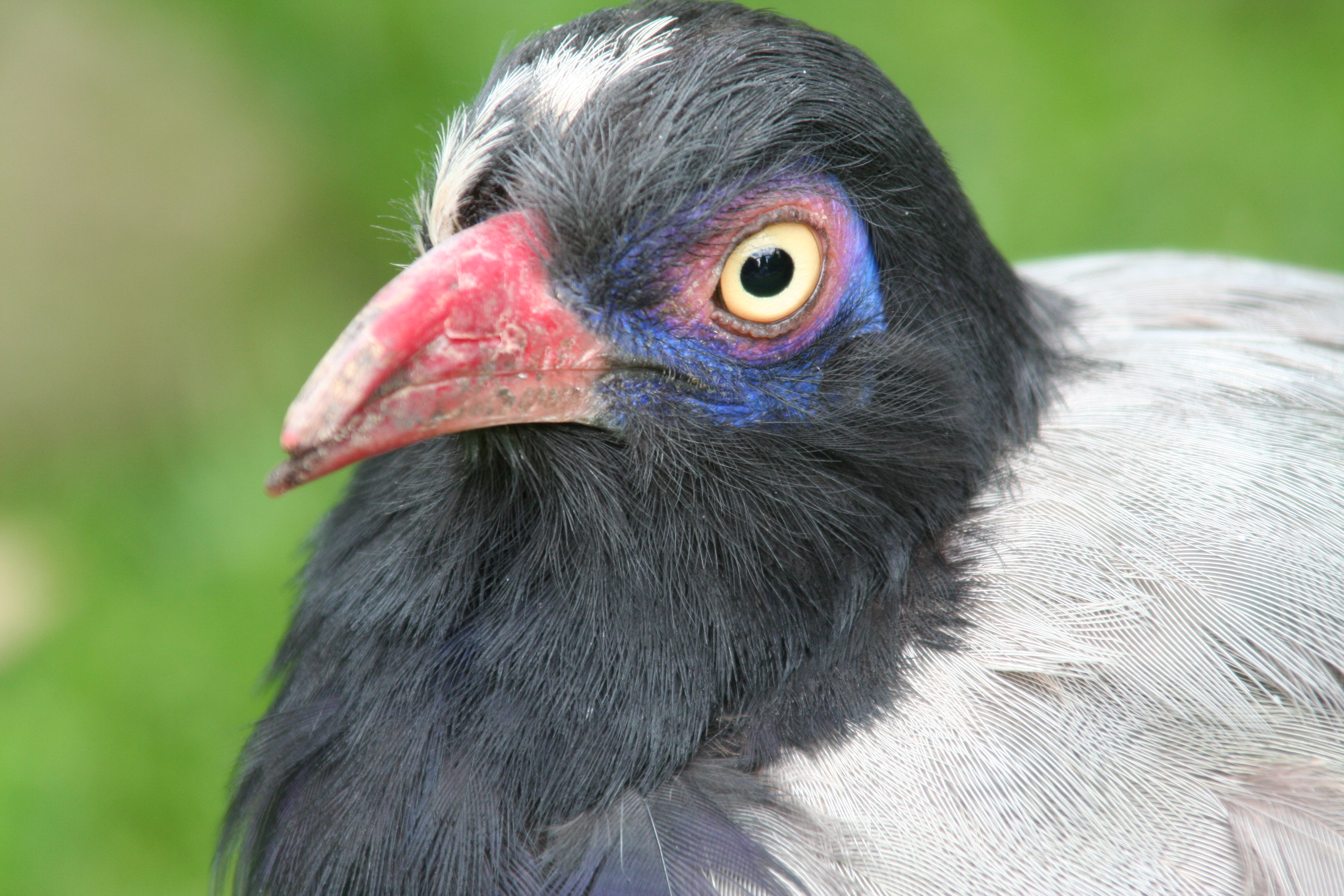
- Coral-billed ground cuckoo (Carpococcyx renauldi)

Scientific classification
- Kingdom: Animalia
- Phylum: Chordata
- Class: Aves
- Order: Cuculiformes
- Family: Cuculidae
- Genus: Carpococcyx; G.R. Gray, 1840

Type species
- Calobates radiceus Temminck, 1832

Synonyms
- Calobates Temminck, 1832

= Carpococcyx =

Genus of cuckoos

Carpococcyx is a genus of large, terrestrial cuckoos in the family Cuculidae. They are restricted to humid forested regions in Southeast Asia. Despite their similarities, they are not closely related to the South American ground cuckoos of the genus Neomorphus.

== Species ==
This genus contains three allopatric species, two of which until recently were considered conspecific under the name Sunda ground cuckoo:

Genus Carpococcyx – G.R. Gray, 1840 – three species
Common name	Scientific name and subspecies	Range	Size and ecology	IUCN status and estimated population
Coral-billed ground cuckoo	Carpococcyx renauldi Oustalet, 1896	Cambodia, Laos, Thailand, and Vietnam	Size: Habitat: Diet:	VU
Bornean ground cuckoo	Carpococcyx radiceus (Temminck, 1832)	Brunei, Malaysia, and Indonesia	Size: Habitat: Diet:	VU
Sumatran ground cuckoo	Carpococcyx viridis Salvadori, 1879	Sumatra	Size: Habitat: Diet:	CR
