= Open range =

Rangeland where cattle roam freely regardless of land ownership

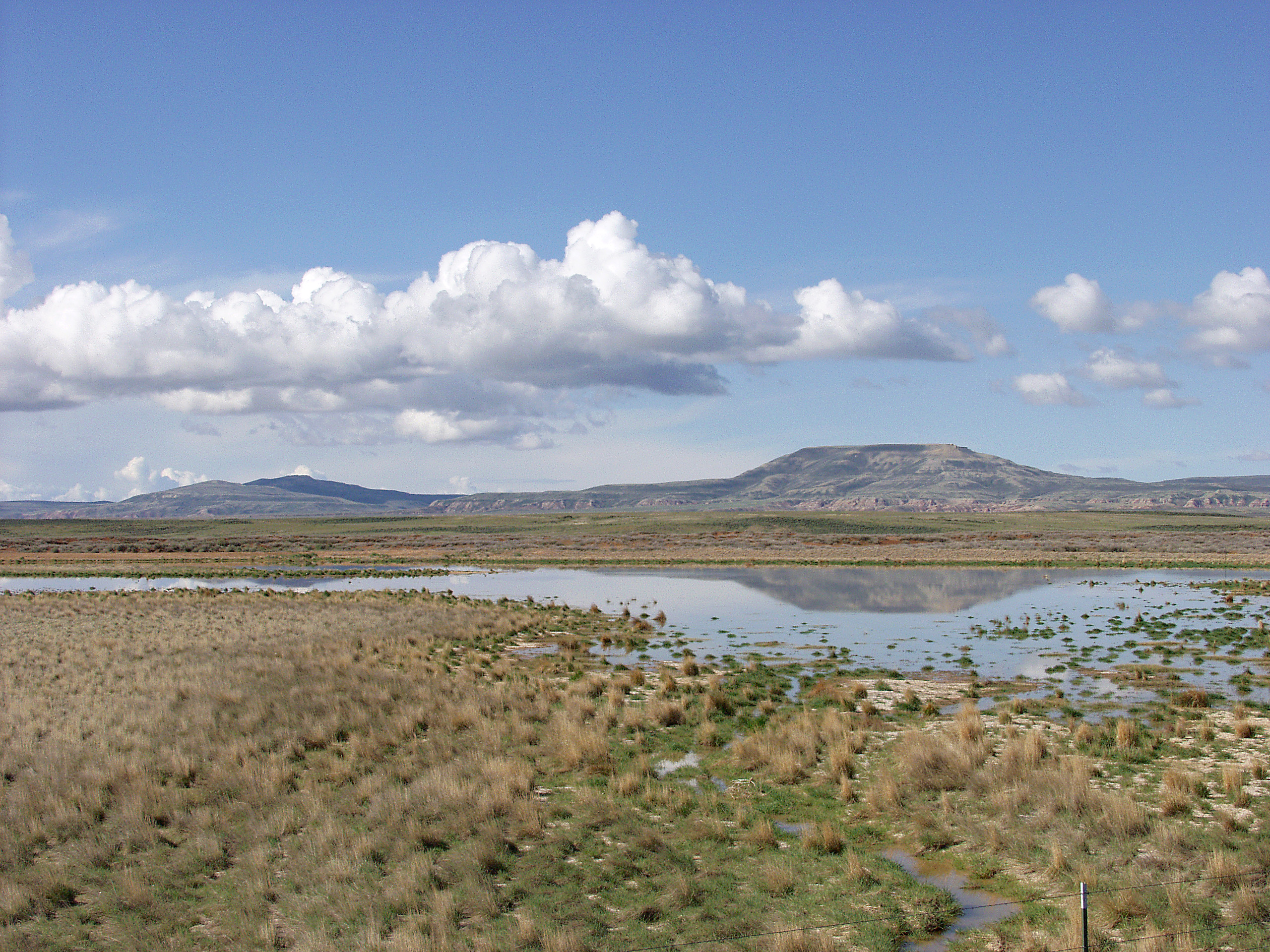
Red Desert rangeland in Wyoming

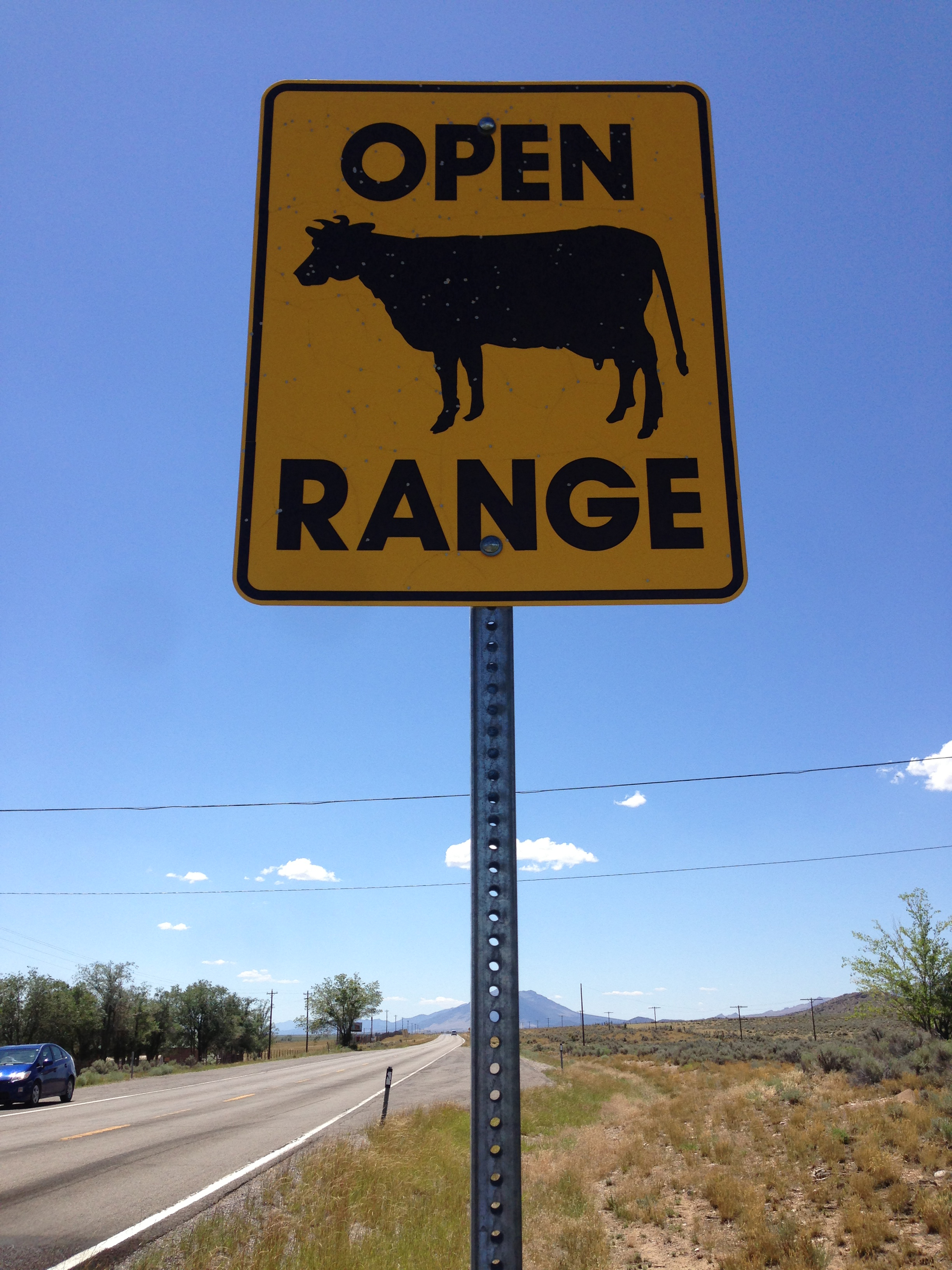
Open Range sign along southbound U.S. Route 93 in Lincoln County, Nevada.

In the Western United States and Canada, open range is rangeland where cattle roam freely regardless of land ownership. Where there are "open range" laws, those wanting to keep animals off their property must erect a fence to keep animals out; this applies to public roads as well. Land in open range that is designated as part of a "herd district" reverses liabilities, requiring an animal's owner to fence it in or otherwise keep it on the person's own property. Most eastern states and jurisdictions in Canada require owners to fence in or herd their livestock.

== History and practice ==
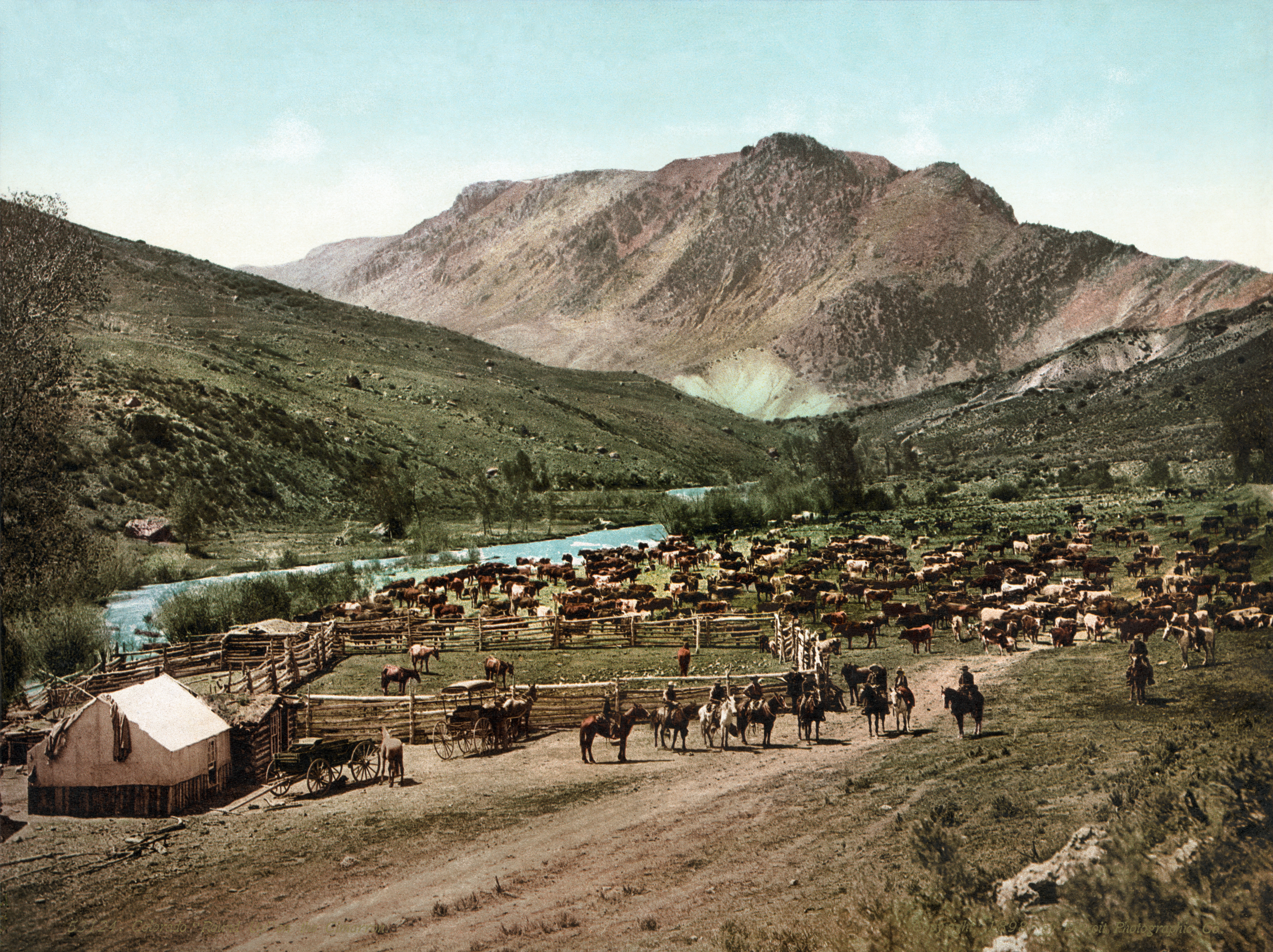
A cattle roundup in Colorado, c.1898.

The Western open-range tradition originated from the early practice of unregulated grazing of livestock in the newly acquired western territories of the United States and Canada. These practices were eventually codified in the laws of many Western US states as they developed written statutes. Over time, as the Western lands became more populated and more developed (through railroads, mining, farming, etc.), open-range laws began to be challenged and were significantly curtailed, though they still exist in certain areas of most Western US states and Canadian provinces. Open-range conditions existed in Western Canada prior to the 1889 amendments of the Dominion Lands Act, which prohibited cattle from grazing on unleased land, though the practice did not disappear immediately.

Open-range management has also been practiced in other areas, including the Caribbean and some Eastern US states, such as South Carolina during the colonial period. The practice was also widespread in Mexico, and some argue that the Mexican tradition may have been the predecessor to open-range practices in the American West, much of which was part of Mexico prior to the 1840s. American ranchers borrowed many other cattle-raising techniques from Mexico.

Unlike the Eastern United States, the Western prairies of the 19th century were vast, undeveloped, and uncultivated. The land was also generally much more arid, with scarce, widely separated sources of water. Until the invention of barbed wire in the 1870s, it was more practical to fence the livestock out of developed land, rather than to fence it in. As the United States government acquired Western territories by purchasing, conquest, and treaty, land not yet placed into private ownership was publicly owned and freely available for grazing cattle, though conflicting land-claims and periodic warfare with Native Americans placed some practical limits on grazing areas at various times.

Free-roaming range cattle were calved, moved between grazing lands, and driven to market by cowboys. Brands on cattle marked who owned them. Unbranded cattle, known as "mavericks", could become the property of anyone able to capture and brand them.

The invention of barbed wire in the 1870s made it easier to confine cattle to designated areas, which helped to prevent overgrazing of the range, and made fencing huge expanses cheaper than hiring cowboys to handle cattle. In Texas and surrounding areas, rapid population growth required ranchers to fence off their lands. This initially brought considerable drama to the Western rangelands. Indiscriminate fencing of federal lands was commonplace in the 1880s, often without any regard to land ownership or other public needs, such as mail delivery and movement of other kinds of livestock. Various state statutes, as well as vigilantism during the so-called Fence Cutting Wars, tried to enforce or combat fence-building, with varying success. In 1885 U.S. federal legislation outlawed the enclosure of public land. By 1890 illegal fencing had been mostly removed.

In the north, overgrazing stressed the open range, leading to insufficient winter forage for cattle and their subsequent starvation, particularly during the harsh winter of 1886–1887, when severely overgrazed rangelands combined with unusually cold temperatures killed hundreds of thousands of cattle. This was called the Big Die-Up by ranchers and across the northern plains, led to the sudden collapse of the cattle industry. By the 1890s, barbed-wire fencing had become standard on the northern plains, railroads had expanded to cover most of the U.S., and meatpacking plants were being built closer to major ranching areas, making long cattle drives from Texas to the railheads in Kansas unnecessary. The age of the open range was over and large cattle-drives were no more. At the same time, independently-owned ranches multiplied all over the developing West.

In the late 19th century, sheep were also driven over long distances across the open range. The Healy and Patterson Sheep Company developed an extensive system of seasonal sheep drives across the open range of the unfenced Old West. Each spring, flocks purchased in California or Oregon were trailed to summer range near Soda Springs, Idaho. In autumn, portions of the flocks were sold locally while others were driven for winter grazing to the arid and semiarid winter ranges of the Great Basin and interior Wyoming, especially Wyoming's Red Desert.

== Modern times ==
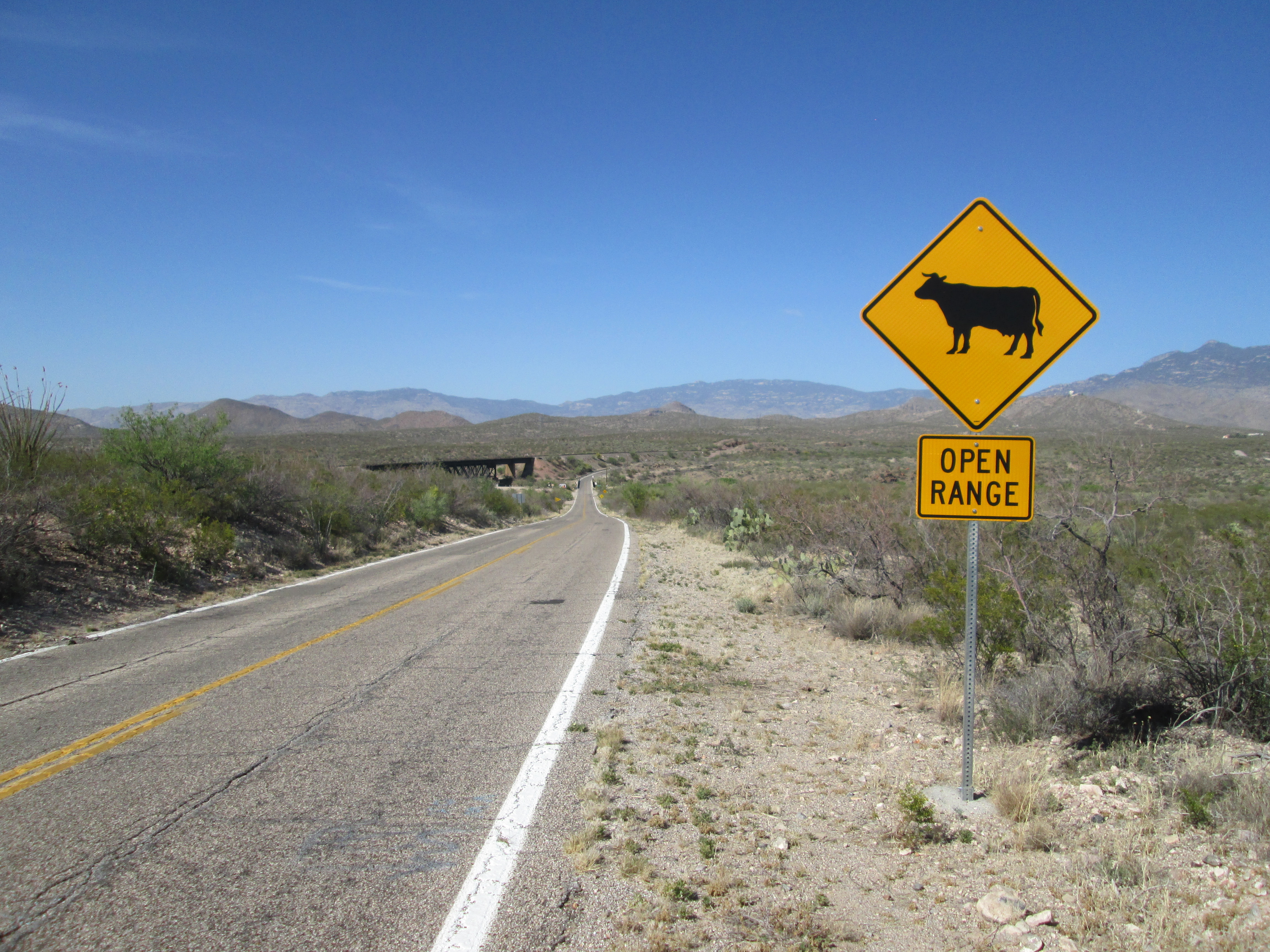
An open range sign along the Interstate 10 Frontage Road in southern Arizona.

Where there are "open range" laws, people wanting to keep animals off their property must erect a legal fence to keep animals out, as opposed to the "herd district" where an animal's owner must fence it in or otherwise keep it on the person's own property. Most eastern states and jurisdictions in Canada require owners to fence in or herd their livestock. Many states in the west, e.g. Texas, are at least nominally still open-range states.

In modern times, free roaming cattle can be a nuisance and danger in developed areas. Most western states, even those that are nominally open at the state level, now limit open range to certain areas. Under open range law today, if livestock break through a "legal fence" (defined by law in terms of height, materials, post spacing, etc.), then the livestock owner is liable for damages of the fenced property. Conversely, the livestock owner is not liable in the absence of the "legal fence." An exception exists for "unruly" animals, usually meaning breeding bulls and stallions, which are supposed to be restricted by the owner.

On roadways within an open range area, in a cow-car collision on a roadway, the rancher was at one time not generally liable, but recent law changes beginning in the 1980s gradually increased rancher liability, first requiring cattle be kept off federal highways, then other developed roads, and in some cases, limited open range grazing only to certain times of the year. In some states, such as Montana, case law on the open range has, for all practical purposes, eliminated it altogether, though statutes may remain on the books. Today, a vehicle has a much higher chance of hitting a wild animal than livestock.

Laws are still in flux. In Arizona, livestock must be fenced in within incorporated areas, but are still listed only as a potential nuisance for unincorporated suburbs. Therefore, in that state, bills were being pushed to get rid of this "antiquated" law. Those opposing the legislation said that "eliminating the law would put undue hardship on ranchers. However, the law has sometimes been settled via legal action. In Montana, the Montana Supreme Court in the decision Larson-Murphy v. Steiner, for a short time effectively eliminated some aspects of the open range doctrine altogether, though stating that it still applied in other cases, and required legislative action to update the state's statutes to ameliorate some inconsistent provisions of the decision. In that decision, the Court overturned a 33-year-old precedent that had exempted livestock owners from most liability for wandering stock on roadways (other than certain state and federal highways built with federal funds), holding there was "no duty" to motorists under open range doctrine, in Larson-Murphy v. Steiner, the Court held that there was a relationship between livestock owners and motorists on public roads, allowing motorists a cause of action for accidents involving wandering livestock on grounds of negligence. The Montana legislature then amended the statutes governing the open range to impose liability on livestock owners to motorists only for negligence.

On roads in Idaho, an open-range state, livestock have the right of way: if an animal is hit and killed by a vehicle, the driver is liable for the price of the animal and for the repair for the damage to the vehicle. Idaho counties can and have created herd districts, which require livestock owners to "build and maintain adequate fences to keep their animals off roads and neighboring properties"; in herd districts, the livestock owner is liable.

== Gallery ==
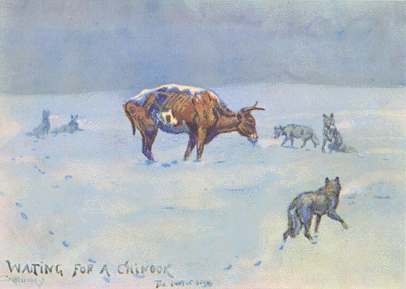
Waiting for a Chinook, by C.M. Russell. Overgrazing and harsh winters were factors that brought an end to the age of the open range.

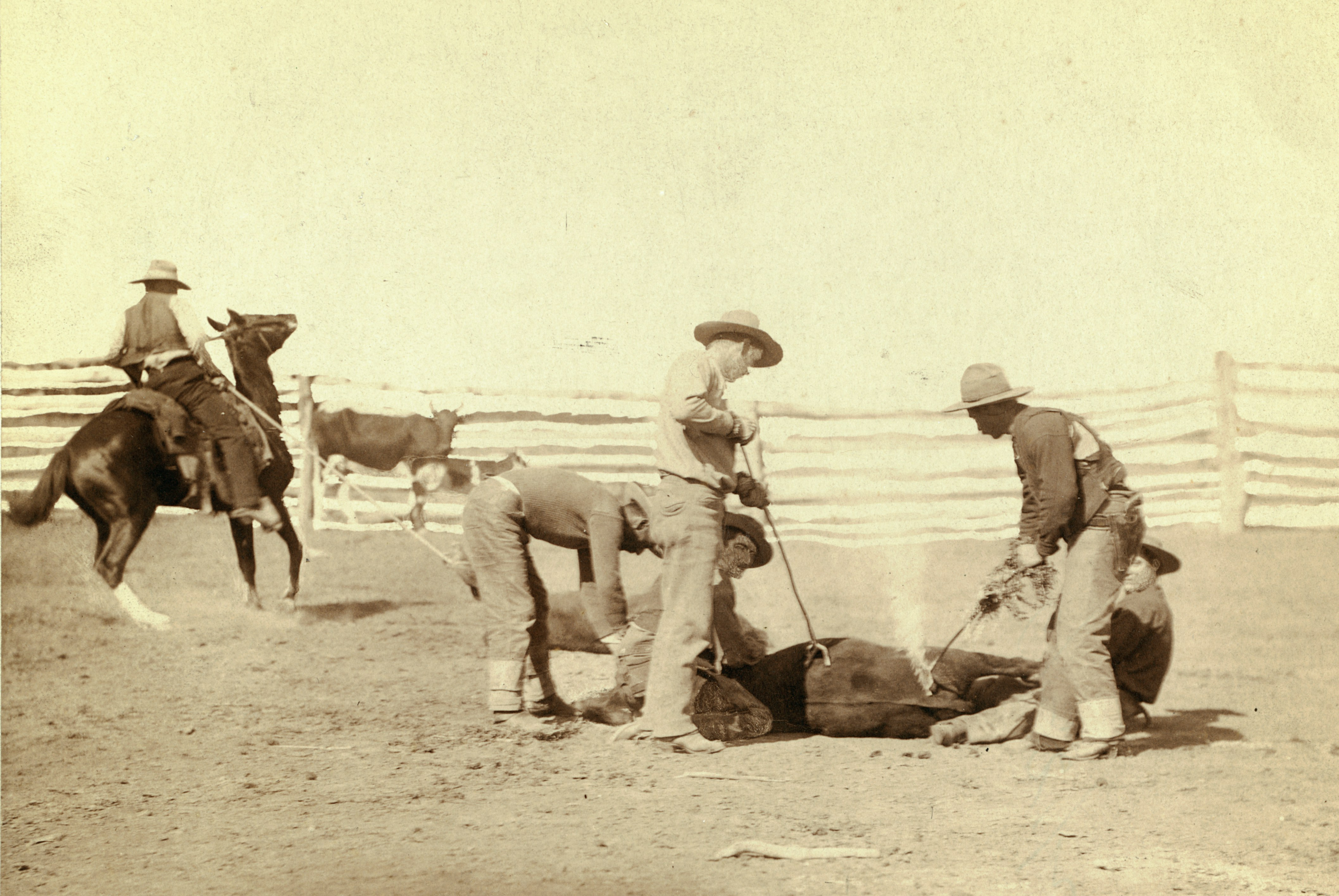
Cowboys branding a calf in South Dakota in 1888.

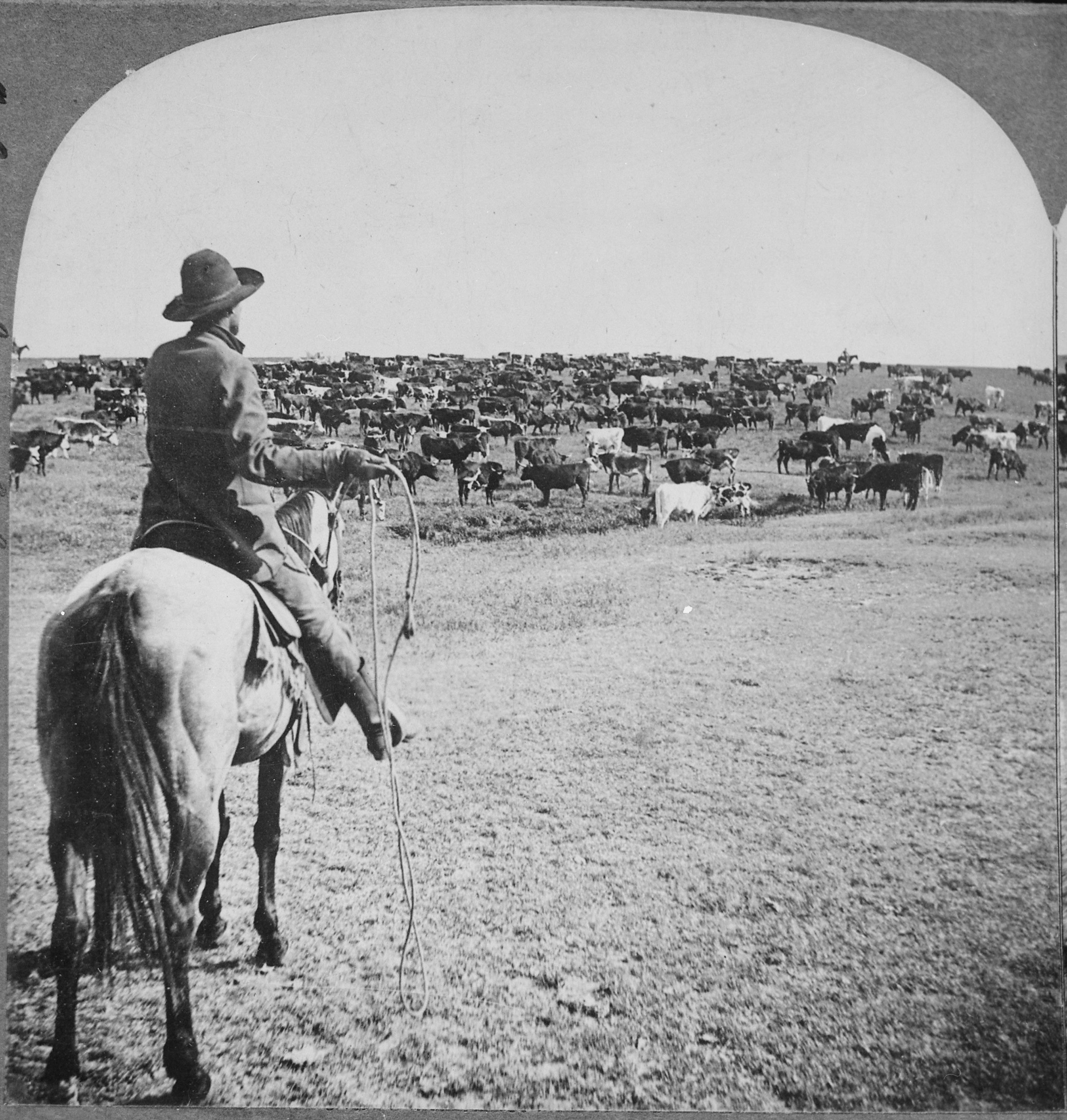
A cowboy holding a lasso at a cattle roundup on the open range in Kansas, c.1902.

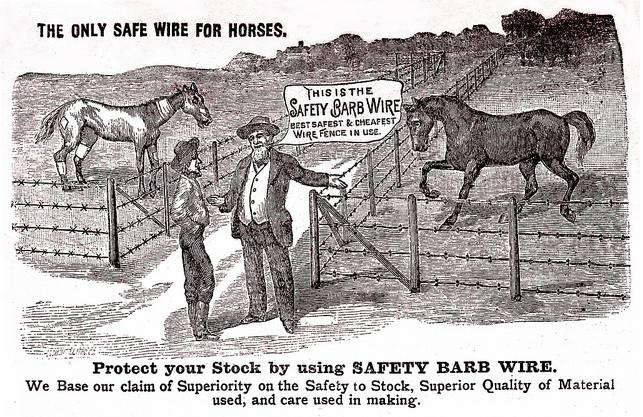
A Safety Barb Wire advertisement.

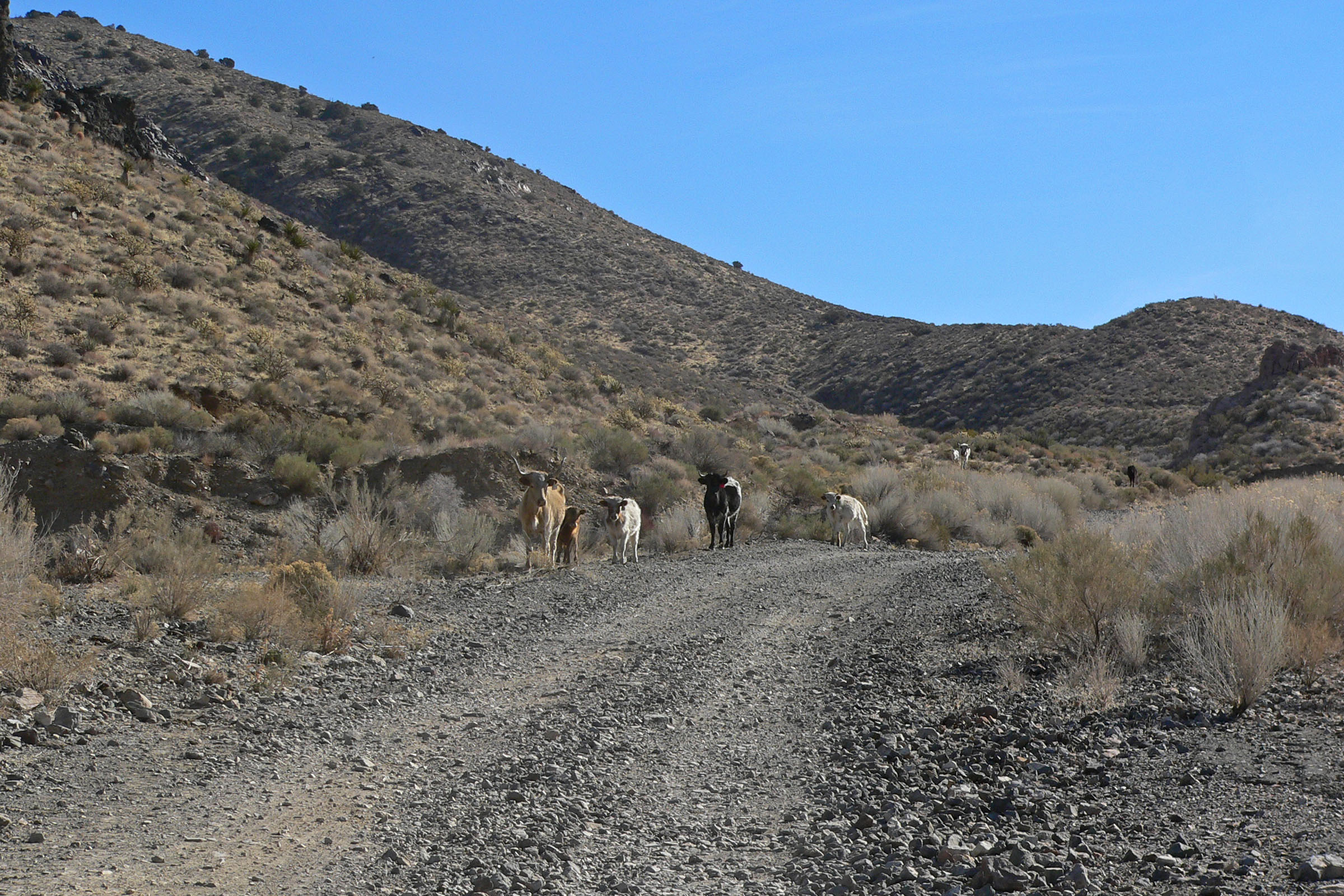
Cattle on a mining road in southern California.

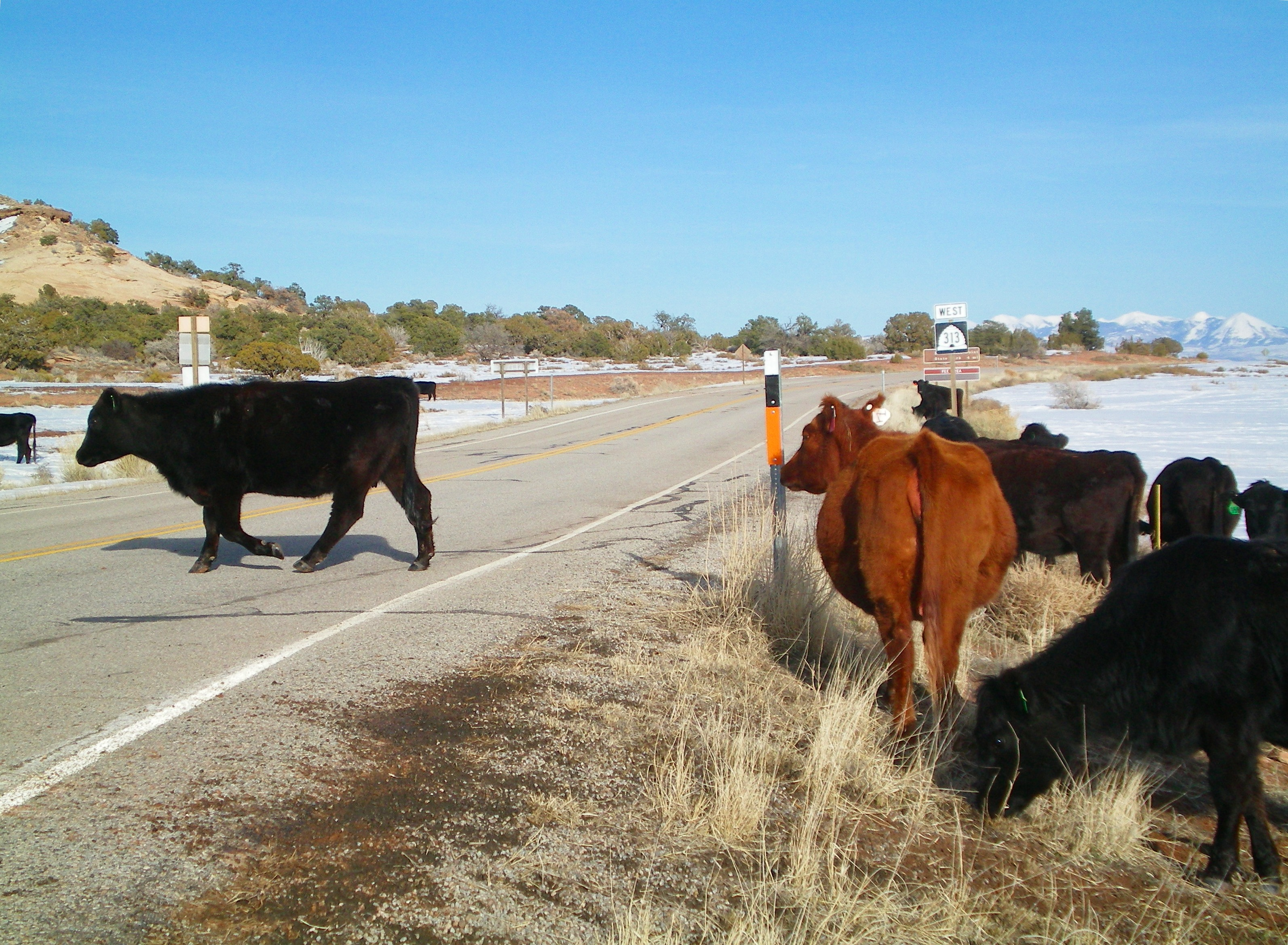
Loose cattle on Utah State Route 313

== See also ==
- Agricultural fencing
- Cattle drives in the United States
- Common land
- Drift fence
- Enclosure (England)
- History of agriculture in the United States
- Roundup
- Patrick Healy (sheepman)
- Range war
- Sheep Wars
- Tragedy of the commons
