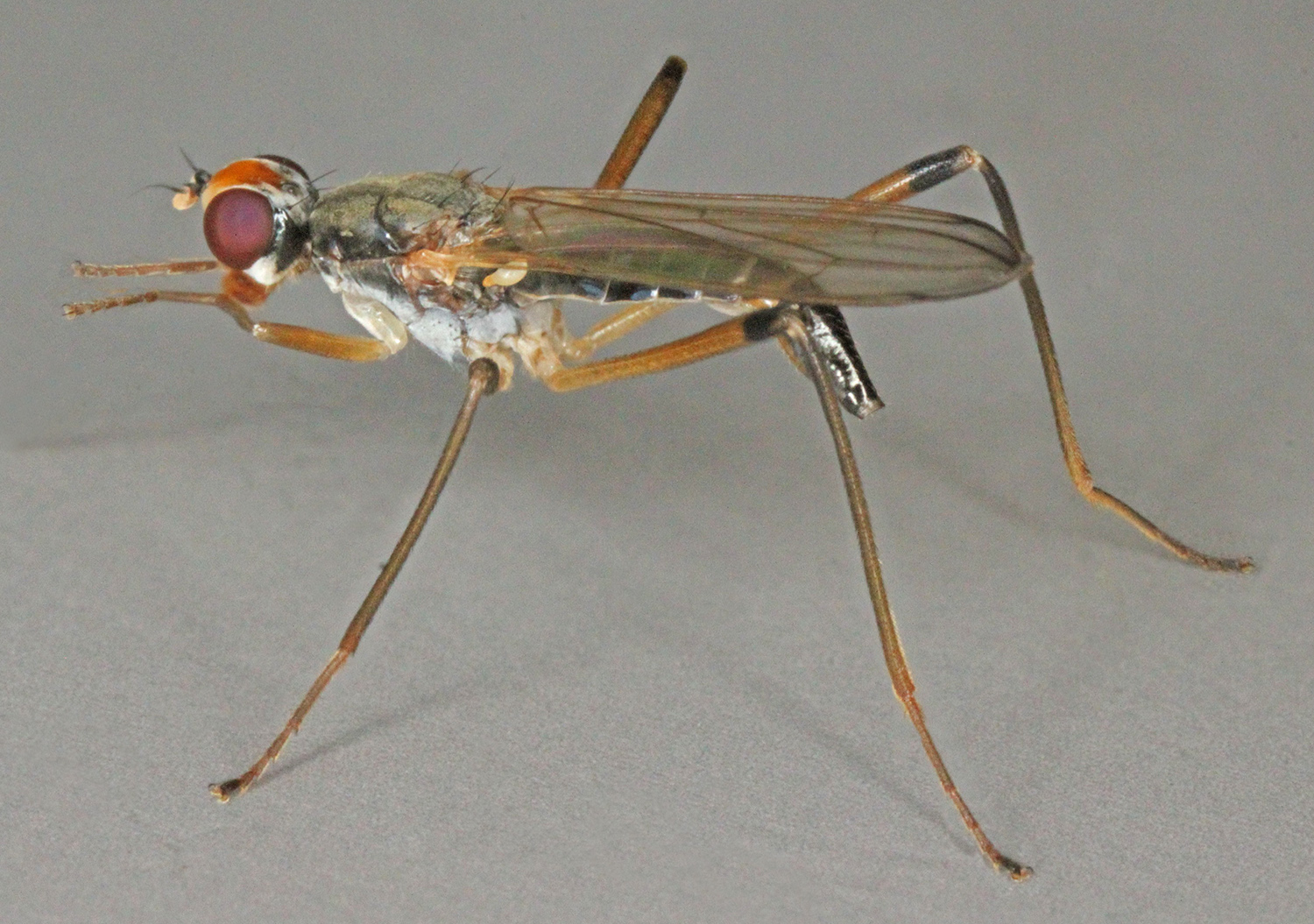
- Calobata petronella North Wales

Scientific classification
- Kingdom: Animalia
- Phylum: Arthropoda
- Class: Insecta
- Order: Diptera
- Family: Micropezidae
- Genus: Calobata
- Species: C. petronella

Binomial name
- Calobata petronella (Linnaeus, 1761)

= Calobata petronella =

Species of fly

Calobata petronella is a species of fly in the family Micropezidae. It is found in the Palearctic.
