= October 2010 North American storm complex =

Extratropical cyclone

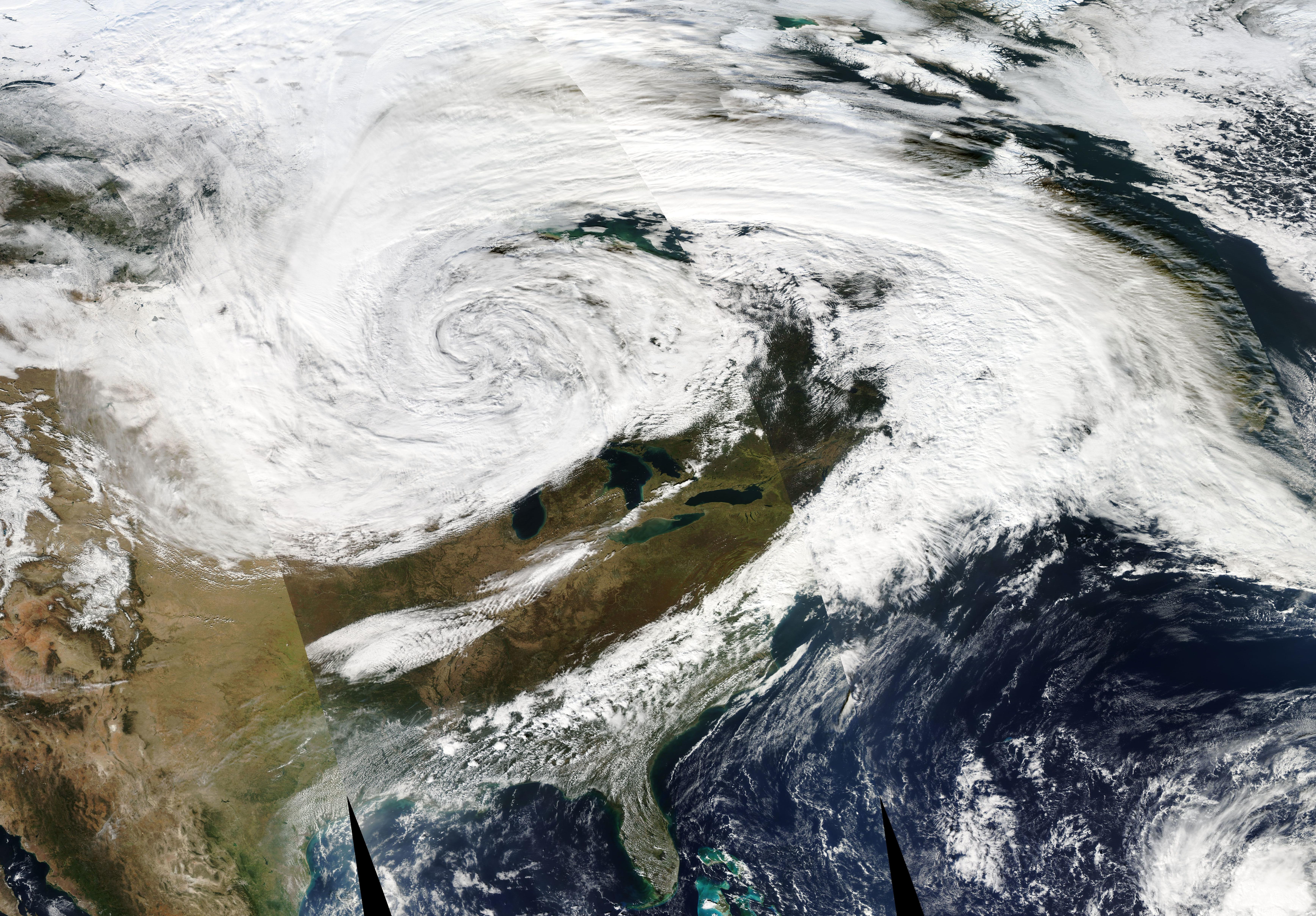
- Satellite image of the storm complex at peak intensity, on October 27, 2010.

Meteorological history
- Formed: October 23, 2010
- Dissipated: November 5, 2010

Extratropical cyclone
- Lowest pressure: 955.2 hPa (mbar); 28.21 inHg
- Max. snowfall: 9 inches (22.9 cm) St. Louis County, Minnesota

Tornado outbreak
- Tornadoes: 69 confirmed (Record for a continuous outbreak in October)
- Max. rating: EF2 tornado

Overall effects
- Damage: US$18.5 million (tornado)
- Areas affected: Eastern two-thirds of North America and adjacent waters Ireland; United Kingdom; Western Europe
- Part of the 2010–11 North American winter and tornado outbreaks of 2010

The October 2010 North American storm complex is the name given to a historic extratropical cyclone that impacted North America. The massive storm complex caused a wide range of weather events including a major serial derecho stretching from the Gulf Coast to the Great Lakes, a widespread tornado outbreak across the Southeast United States and Midwest and a blizzard across portions of the Canadian Prairies and the Dakotas. The cyclone's lowest minimum pressure of 955.2 mb (28.21 inHg) made it the second most intense non-tropical system recorded in the continental United States (CONUS). The lowest confirmed pressure for a non-tropical system in the continental United States was set by a January 1913 Atlantic coast storm.

== Meteorological synopsis ==
Map plotting the storm's track and intensity, according to the Saffir–Simpson scale Map key Saffir–Simpson scale Tropical depression (≤38 mph, ≤62 km/h) Tropical storm (39–73 mph, 63–118 km/h) Category 1 (74–95 mph, 119–153 km/h) Category 2 (96–110 mph, 154–177 km/h) Category 3 (111–129 mph, 178–208 km/h) Category 4 (130–156 mph, 209–251 km/h) Category 5 (≥157 mph, ≥252 km/h) Unknown Storm type Tropical cyclone Subtropical cyclone Extratropical cyclone, remnant low, tropical disturbance, or monsoon depression

Significant snowfall was reported on the backside of the storm. The heaviest snow fell in parts of Minnesota where 9 inches (22.5 cm) of snow was reported in St. Louis County, Minnesota. Heavy snow and blizzard conditions also occurred in North Dakota, southwestern Manitoba and southeastern Saskatchewan.

The non-tropical cyclonic storm generated wind speeds of up to 70 mph, caused by a severe low pressure zone over Nebraska on October 24.

The extratropical cyclone developing, starting late on October 25 and running through October 27, 2010

Akron, Cleveland, Findlay, Marion, Lorain, Mansfield, Toledo, Wooster and Youngstown in Ohio all witnessed heavy winds on the 24th.

Severe weather battered Illinois, Indiana, Michigan, and Ohio on the 25th and 26th of October, producing strong winds, rain, hail, and widespread tornadoes. It was the region's second strongest storm on record. The weather station in Bigfork, Minnesota, recorded a state record atmospheric pressure of 955.2 millibars (28.21 inches of pressure), typical of a Category 3 hurricane. The National Weather Service reported that a tornado with a maximum speed of 115 mph touched down about four miles east of Peotone, Illinois that morning and traveled 2.9 miles, causing downed power lines and partially destroying a home. Another tornado was reported to have landed in Racine, Wisconsin.

Heavy damage was reported in the Chicago area, particularly in Kane, Will, Kankakee, and Iroquois counties in Illinois and in Porter County, Indiana. The winds flipped single engine planes on their sides at DuPage Airport in West Chicago, and flights were delayed by 30 minutes at O'Hare and Midway airports. More than 300 flights were canceled at O'Hare International Airport, and more than 60,000 ComEd customers were without power. Several other less powerful tornadoes also occurred in Alabama, Arkansas, Kentucky, Michigan, North Carolina, Ohio, South Carolina, Tennessee, Texas, Virginia, and Wisconsin. Heavy snow also fell in south western Ontario. There were no fatalities with this system. A GOES satellite image on October 26 showed what could be considered the eye of the storm over the Minnesota-Ontario border, with outlying clouds reaching as far as Alberta, southern Nunavut, Newfoundland, eastern Montana, Colorado, Louisiana, Maine, and Bermuda.

The storm developed so quickly, that it was declared to be a weather 'bomb', which is an extremely fast developing storm that drops at least one millibar of pressure per hour for 24 hours—a phenomenon more commonly seen over water than land.

On the morning of October 26, a serial derecho caused widespread damage in Kentucky, Tennessee, Illinois, Wisconsin, Michigan, and Ohio. Louisville, Cincinnati, Toledo, Nashville, and Indianapolis were hit at 9 am CDT, and Detroit was hit during the midday and early afternoon hours. Other cities impacted by the storms included Pittsburgh, Buffalo, and Charleston. At one point in the morning a line of tornado warnings stretched from central Michigan down to northern Mississippi.

On October 28, the storm system left the East Coast. During the next few days, the system moved eastward across the Atlantic, before stalling over the western Mediterranean on November 1. On November 5, the system dissipated over the western Mediterranean region.

== Confirmed tornadoes ==
Confirmed tornadoes by Enhanced Fujita rating
EFU	EF0	EF1	EF2	EF3	EF4	EF5	Total
0	35	26	8	0	0	0	69

=== October 23 event ===
List of reported tornadoes - Saturday, October 23, 2010
EF#	Location	County	Coord.	Time (UTC)	Path length	Comments/Damage
Texas
EF0	Fort Worth	Tarrant	32.802°N 97.202°W	1755	unknown	Brief tornado with damage to roofs and fences.
Sources: SPC Storm Reports for 10/23/10 WFAA "Tornadoes touch down south and east of Dallas"

=== October 24 event ===
List of reported tornadoes - Sunday, October 24, 2010
EF#	Location	County	Coord.	Time (UTC)	Path length	Comments/Damage
Texas
EF0	N of Daingerfield	Morris	33.07°N 94.72°W	2030	3 miles (4.8 km)	Damage limited to a few trees.
EF2	Rice area	Navarro	32.23°N 96.50°W	2255	7 miles (11 km)	Five houses were destroyed and three others were damaged. A high school was also heavily damaged and a train was derailed. A baseball field was damaged and vehicles were flipped on the interstate. Trees were snapped and uprooted as well. Several people were injured.
EF0	Lone Oak	Hunt	33.00°N 95.93°W	2300	200 yards (180 m)	Brief tornado damaged 10 houses in a residential subdivision.
EF0	N of Mount Vernon	Franklin	33.19°N 95.23°W	2315	0.25 miles (400 m)	Brief tornado with minor tree damage.
EF0	N of Mount Pleasant	Morris	33.21°N 94.98°W	2347	0.75 miles (1.21 km)	Damage limited to a few trees.
Alabama
EF1	Elsanor	Baldwin	30.54°N 87.55°W	0210	1.7 miles (2.7 km)	A mobile home and a metal shed were destroyed and a brick houses sustained minor damage. One person sustained minor injuries.
Michigan
EF0	WNW of Coloma	Berrien	42.20°N 86.34°W	0250	0.1 miles (160 m)	Brief tornado with minor damage to two houses and a roof blown off a barn.
Arkansas
EF0	W of Crystal Valley	Pulaski		unknown	0.77 miles (1.24 km)	A barn lost its roof, and some trees were damaged.
Sources: SPC Storm Reports for 10/24/10, NWS Fort Worth, NWS Shreveport, NWS Mobile, NWS Little Rock

=== October 25 event ===
List of reported tornadoes - Monday, October 25, 2010
EF#	Location	County	Coord.	Time (UTC)	Path length	Comments/Damage
Tennessee
EF1	Pleasant Hill	Moore	30.67°N 88.14°W	0540	1.2 miles (1.9 km)	A hay barn was destroyed and two houses had porch damage. Trees were also knocked down.
Alabama
EF1	S of Haleyville	Winston	34.18°N 87.60°W	0705	10.5 miles (16.9 km)	A large barn and a shed were destroyed and three houses were damaged. Extensive tree damage along the path.
EF0	Arab	Marshall	34.34°N 86.50°W	0923	1 mile (1.6 km)	Minor damage to a house and significant damage to an outbuilding. Numerous trees were snapped.
EF0	NE of Section	Jackson	34.61°N 85.92°W	0952	2.2 miles (3.5 km)	A trailer and a shed were destroyed, a house was damaged, and several trees were downed.
EF2	Ider area	Jackson, DeKalb, Dade (GA)	34.68°N 85.64°W	1002	25.7 miles (41.4 km)	Long track tornado with major damage to several houses and barns, one of the houses was nearly destroyed. Several people were injured.
EF1	Near Rosalie	Jackson, DeKalb	34.63°N 85.78°W	1005	15.7 miles (25.3 km)	A house, two barns, and several other structures were damaged. Numerous trees were downed.
EF1	Mobile	Mobile	30.67°N 88.14°W	1120	1 mile (1.6 km)	Several houses and commercial buildings, including a shopping center, were damaged.
Sources: NWS Mobile, NWS Huntsville, NWS Birmingham, NWS Peachtree City

=== October 26 event ===
List of reported tornadoes - Tuesday, October 26, 2010
EF#	Location	County	Coord.	Time (UTC)	Path length	Comments/Damage
Illinois
EF1	ESE of Ashton	Lee		1041	1.1 miles (1.8 km)	Several farm outbuildings were destroyed and a metal silo was punched inward.
EF1	W of Plato Center	Kane		714	1.50 miles (2.41 km)	Straight line wind damage was reported. Also a few barns were destroyed.
EF1	NW of Elburn	Kane	41.89°N 88.51°W	1155	0.75 miles (1.21 km)	Two farm houses were damaged and a grain bin and two barns were destroyed.
EF2	E of Peotone	Will	41.33°N 87.72°W	1240	2.9 miles (4.7 km)	One house was severely damaged with the second level destroyed. Power poles were also damaged.
Wisconsin
EF1	NNE of Kenosha	Racine, Kenosha	42.66°N 87.89°W	1247	6 miles (9.7 km)	Two industrial buildings were heavily damaged and a barn and garage were destroyed. Trees and power poles were also knocked down. Two people were injured.
Indiana
EF0	SE of Malden	Porter	41.33°N 86.97°W	1333	200 yards (180 m)	One outbuilding was damaged by this brief tornado.
EF1	Wanatah	LaPorte	41.43°N 86.89°W	1342	1 mile (1.6 km)	A garage and a shelter were heavily damaged and power poles were knocked down.
EF0	ENE of Kokomo	Howard	40.49°N 86.08°W	1405	unknown	Several houses sustained damage, one of which had significant damage.
EF1	E of Bracken	Huntington	40.94°N 85.62°W	1421	0.6 miles (970 m)	A metal grain barn and several outbuildings were destroyed.
EF0	SW of Oswego	Kosciusko	41.30°N 85.82°W	1431	1 mile (1.6 km)	Numerous houses in a subdivision sustained shingle damage. Corn was flattened and yard items were thrown, and a radio tower and power poles were bent.
EF0	SW of Luther	Huntington, Whitley	41.00°N 85.60°W	1433	2 miles (3.2 km)	One house sustained minor damage. A grain bin and several outbuildings were destroyed.
EF0	Wabash	Wabash	40.82°N 85.84°W	1420	4.8 miles (7.7 km)	Minor damage at a Walmart store and a vocational school.
EF1	NE of Peabody	Whitley	41.11°N 85.47°W	1440	2 miles (3.2 km)	Numerous houses sustained minor damage, and several outbuildings were severely damaged. Numerous trees were also uprooted.
EF1	S of Grabill	Allen	41.06°N 84.90°W	1502	7 miles (11 km)	Numerous houses were damaged and barns destroyed. Trees and power poles were knocked down.
EF1	SW of Cuba	Allen	41.15°N 84.98°W	1504	1.5 miles (2.4 km)	Several barns were heavily damaged and a house sustained minor damage. Four train cars were blown off the tracks.
Kentucky
EF0	S of Pembroke	Christian	36.75°N 87.36°W	1352	2 miles (3.2 km)	A barn sustained minor damage and a few trees were snapped.
EF0	N of Trenton	Todd	36.77°N 87.26°W	1358	0.25 miles (400 m)	Brief tornado blew recreational equipment around a yard and damaged a barn.
EF0	NE of Graham	Muhlenberg	37.26°N 87.26°W	1420	200 yards (180 m)	Brief tornado with minor tree damage.
EF0	Hopkinsville area	Christian	36.85°N 87.49°W	1420	2.5 miles (4.0 km)	A Food Lion store sustained roof damage, and a barn and two storage buildings were heavily damaged.
EF0	SW of Mount Washington	Bullitt	38.08°N 85.51°W	1551	150 yards (140 m)	A concrete workshop was heavily damage.
EF1	SE of Bowling Green	Warren	36.94°N 86.40°W	1608	1.3 miles (2.1 km)	Intermittent tornado touchdown heavily damaged a barn and damaged some trees.
EF1	Middlesboro	Bell	36.61°N 83.72°W	2210	0.7 miles (1.1 km)	Several buildings and numerous trees were damaged in town.
Ohio
EF0	NW of Convoy	Van Wert	40.92°N 84.76°W	1502	3.5 miles (5.6 km)	A barn lost its roof, a shed was destroyed and a camper and semi-trailer were blown down.
EF1	NW of Grover Hill	Van Wert, Paulding	40.99°N 84.59°W	1512	9.25 miles (14.89 km)	Numerous houses sustained minor damage. Two barns and a grain bin were destroyed and many trees were uprooted.
EF1	E of Oakwood	Paulding, Putnam	41.08°N 84.34°W	1529	5 miles (8.0 km)	A few houses sustained minor shingle damage and several barns and sheds were destroyed.
EF1	N of Eldorado	Preble, Darke	39.91°N 84.69°W	1540	5.5 miles (8.9 km)	Two houses sustained minor damage and barns and outbuildings sustained major damage. Several trees were uprooted.
EF0	SW of Cridersville	Auglaize	40.67°N 84.11°W	1558	65 yards (60 m)	Very brief tornado damaged a barn and a garage.
EF2	Cridersville area	Auglaize, Allen	40.63°N 84.17°W	1559	2.2 miles (3.5 km)	A house, a barn and a garage were destroyed and numerous other houses were damaged, some heavily. A brick gymnasium was also destroyed.
EF0	SE of Sabina	Clinton, Fayette	39.44°N 83.64°W	1720	4 miles (6.4 km)	Several barns were heavily damaged or destroyed. Two houses sustained minor damage.
EF0	E of Sabina	Fayette	39.49°N 83.54°W	1730	2 miles (3.2 km)	A large storage facility was heavily damaged and several sheds and outbuildings were also damaged.
EF0	SW of Commercial Point	Pickaway	39.72°N 83.11°W	1752	1.5 miles (2.4 km)	Several barns and outbuildings were heavily damaged or destroyed.
EF0	N of Groveport	Franklin	39.87°N 82.87°W	1805	100 yards (90 m)	Brief tornado destroyed two barns.
EF0	E of Pataskala	Licking	40.00°N 82.53°W	1827	0.5 miles (800 m)	Several houses were damaged and trees were snapped.
Alabama
EF1	Hillsboro	Lawrence	34.65°N 87.13°W	1823	1.1 miles (1.8 km)	Several trees were uprooted.
EF0	Greenbrier	Limestone	34.64°N 86.85°W	2040	500 yards (460 m)	Brief tornado damaged a few small trees.
EF1	W of Geraldine	DeKalb	34.35°N 86.07°W	2303	4.25 miles (6.84 km)	One house sustained significant damage, along with a workshop, a boat and three vehicles. Trees were also snapped.
EF0	McVille	Marshall	34.27°N 86.12°W	2313	0.9 miles (1.4 km)	Minor damage to trees and a barn.
Tennessee
EF0	Harrison	Hamilton	35.09°N 85.20°W	2200	0.1 miles (160 m)	Brief tornado with minor damage to a church and a few trees twisted and snapped.
EF2	Chattanooga	Hamilton		2250	1.2 miles (1.9 km)	Tornado touched down over Chickamauga Dam. An apartment complex lost its roof and a cement plant was destroyed. Two trailers were blown into the water and destroyed as well.
North Carolina
EF2	W of Vale	Lincoln	35.54°N 81.48°W	2310	3 miles (4.8 km)	Several houses were destroyed and many others were damaged, some heavily. Many trees were also snapped or uprooted. 12 people were injured, one seriously.
EF2	Claremont	Catawba	35.71°N 81.16°W	2345	2 miles (3.2 km)	Many trees were uprooted or snapped and grave stones were knocked over. Roof torn off of a furniture distribution center along with lesser roof damage to other homes and businesses. Tractor-trailers were flipped over as well.
EF1	King (1st tornado)	Stokes	36.28°N 80.36°W	0314	2.25 miles (3.62 km)	Numerous trees were snapped and a carport was heavily damaged.
South Carolina
EF0	NW of Tigerville	Greenville	35.08°N 82.48°W	2310	5 miles (8.0 km)	Extensive tree damage with many snapped or uprooted, a few falling on houses. Boats were also damaged on Chinquapin Lake.
Sources: NWS Chicago, NWS Northern Indiana, NWS Milwaukee, NWS Indianapolis, NWS Wilmington, OH, NWS Morristown, NWS Louisville, NWS Paducah, NWS Blacksburg, NWS Jackson, KY, NWS Huntsville, NWS Greenville/Spartanburg

=== October 27 event ===
List of reported tornadoes - Wednesday, October 27, 2010
EF#	Location	County	Coord.	Time (UTC)	Path length	Comments/Damage
Virginia
EF0	Aiken Summit area	Henry, Pittsylvania	36.61°N 79.72°W	0414	5.4 miles (8.7 km)	Three houses sustained minor damage and five outbuildings were damaged.
EF2	NW of Virgilina	Halifax	36.57°N 78.88°W	0652	4 miles (6.4 km)	Several houses were damaged and barns and outbuildings were destroyed. Major and extensive tree damage with thousands of trees snapped or uprooted.
EF0	N of Skipwith	Mecklenburg	36.76°N 78.49°W	0714	1.25 miles (2.01 km)	A shed was damaged and numerous trees and power lines were knocked down.
EF1	Richmond area	Richmond (city), Hanover	37.55°N 77.50°W	2100	11.5 miles (18.5 km)	Tornado developed on the north side of Richmond and tracked through the eastern suburbs. Many trees and power poles were knocked down, damaging over 100 houses in the process, a few severely. One person was injured.
North Carolina
EF0	Roxboro Lake	Person	36.37°N 79.15°W	1958	200 yards (180 m)	Damaged limited to a few trees.
EF1	Roxboro	Person	36.39°N 78.95°W	2013	0.5 miles (800 m)	Several mobile homes were damaged, one of them severely. Numerous trees were snapped or uprooted.
EF1	Carr	Orange	36.19°N 79.22°W	2130	2.5 miles (4.0 km)	Two houses and a church sustained significant damage. Many trees were damaged.
EF0	E of Berea	Granville	36.33°N 78.71°W	2215	5.25 miles (8.45 km)	Several houses sustained minor damage and sheds and outbuildings were destroyed.
EF0	W of Middleburg	Vance	36.38°N 78.38°W	2250	2.75 miles (4.43 km)	A BP gas station and two houses sustained minor damage. Many trees were snapped and sheds and outbuildings were destroyed.
EF1	King (2nd tornado)	Stokes	36.26°N 80.36°W	2305	0.75 miles (1.21 km)	Second tornado hit King 20 hours after the first one. About 25 houses were damaged, some of which had roofs blown off. Numerous trees were snapped.
Sources: NWS Wakefield #1, #2, NWS Blacksburg, NWS Raleigh

== See also ==
- Tornadoes of 2010
- Cyclone Carmen
