= January 1886 blizzard =

Weather event in the United States

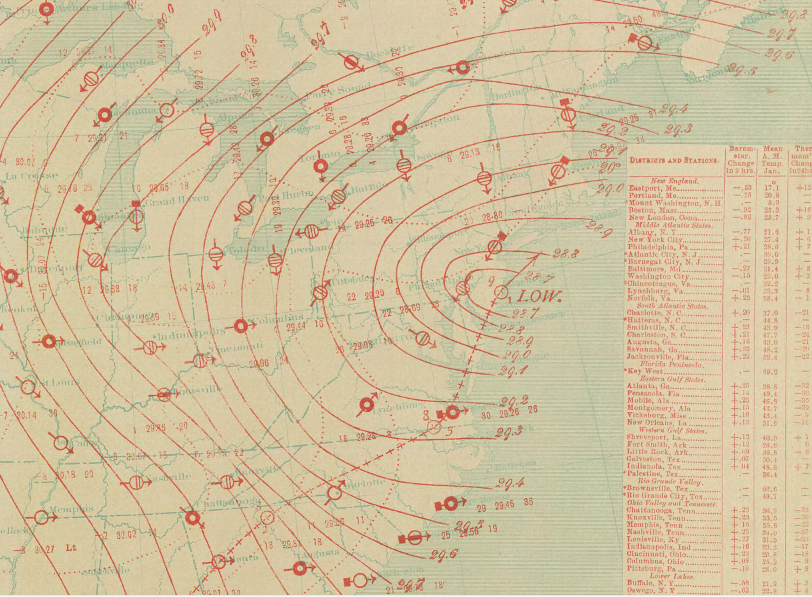
- Surface analysis of Blizzard on January 9, 1886.

Meteorological history
- Formed: January 6, 1886
- Dissipated: January 11, 1886

Extratropical cyclone
- Max. snowfall: 18.5 inches (47 cm)

Overall effects
- Fatalities: 38+
- Areas affected: Plains, South, and East

The January 1886 blizzard in North America was caused by a strong extratropical cyclone which initially dropped southeast across Texas before strengthening while it moved through the South and East, near the Eastern Seaboard through New England. The cyclone was at its strongest as it moved by New Jersey. This system formed within an active pattern which brought significant snow to the southern Rockies over many days. The system brought high winds and snowfall near and west of its path, resulting in blizzard conditions across portions of the Plains and East. A significant cold spell was ushered in by this system across portions of the southern and eastern United States. A slightly stronger storm on January 3, 1913, broke January low sea level pressure records originally set by this storm.

== Meteorological evolution ==
A cold wave was ongoing across the northern Plains when this low developed, with temperatures close to −50 °F (−46 °C) near the central Canada–US border. A surface low developed north of Texas on January 6, dropping southeast to the lower Texas coast early on January 7. The cyclone tracked inland of the coast through the Deep South later on January 7 and early January 8, before turning northeast through Georgia and emerging offshore the Virginia Capes late on January 8. The system reached its maximum intensity as it moved near New Jersey late on January 8.

The lowest pressure measured on land was 28.69 inches of mercury (972 hPa) at Philadelphia, Pennsylvania, Providence, Rhode Island, and Blue Hill Observatory in Massachusetts; the cyclone was considered one of the most extreme to pass through New England at the time. The storm's center then moved inland across Long Island by 11 a.m. on January 9, then across Rhode Island by 1 p.m. and Boston by 2 p.m. before turning northward through Maine around 10 p.m. Temperature readings quickly fell by 10-15F (6-9 C) after the passage of the cyclone. High-level cirrus clouds led the center of circulation by 24 hours, with snow occurring 12 hours after the cirrus invasion. While weakening, the storm moved through southeast Quebec on January 10. The low pressure area moved at an average forward motion of 34 miles per hour (55 km/h) through the United States.

== Wind and related damage near the coast ==
Fort Macon, North Carolina, registered winds up to 62 miles per hour (100 km/h) from the southwest on January 8. The high winds led to the wreck of the Cressie Wright, with six of the seven aboard perishing. Norfolk, Virginia reported high winds which caused damage. High water and wave action from the Atlantic greatly damaged the New Jersey Southern Railroad track in Sandy Hook, New Jersey, on January 9. The gale in New York City blew away the anemometer cups at the local weather observing site, and led to numerous maritime mishaps. A blizzard was caused by the high winds and heavy snow at New London, Connecticut. A schooner sank with all aboard off Charles Island.

The schooner Alan Greene beached near Port Judith, Rhode Island, while the Mattie D. went ashore near Newport, Rhode Island. This storm reopened an inlet at Martha's Vineyard first opened by a storm in 1856. The inlet reclosed between 1902 and 1903. Provincetown, Massachusetts, experienced its worst gale in a decade, with winds peaking at an estimated 68 miles per hour (109 km/h). Blue Hill Observatory, Massachusetts, saw winds peak at 65 miles per hour (105 km/h). Boston, Massachusetts, measured winds as high as 64 miles per hour (103 km/h) and heavy snow. Seven people died in Boston Harbor while 40 vessels went ashore in New England. Eastport, Maine, experienced a $20,000 (1886 USD) loss during the storm. Snow and sleet fell at that station, and 19 schooners were damaged, with five sinking in the rough seas.

== Blizzard and related snowfall ==
As the initial low pressure system formed, a cold front swept through the Plains, stirring up snow which had fallen from a previous blizzard. Although a minimal amount of new snow fell, blizzard conditions resumed in Colorado, Kansas and Nebraska late on January 6 due to increasing winds. In what was called the Big Die-Up on the Great Plains hundreds of thousands of cattle died. Telegraph wires were downed over a large area, with the rails of the Santa Fe, Burlington, Union, and Kansas Pacific railroads recovered with snow, resuspending travel. Cattle across the region were driven southward. Across the Texas Panhandle, at least five died due to exposure on January 6.

Other locations across the Midwest received blizzard condition's along the inverted trough to the north and northwest of the main low pressure area. On January 7 and 8, this system's associated blizzard led to the largest loss of life from a blizzard in Iowa's history, with 20 perishing. Snow drifts across Kentucky shut down travel on the Louisville and Nashville, Chesapeake and Ohio, and Chesapeake and Southwestern railroads.

In Jasper, Alabama, a mix of rain, sleet and snow fell on January 8 and 9. Savannah, Georgia, reported a light snowfall for the first time in six years. On January 8, a site within Wilkes County, North Carolina recorded 8 inches (20 cm) of snowfall. The South Mountains near Staunton, Virginia, reported 14 inches (36 cm) of snow, with 6 inches (15 cm) measured in Staunton proper. The snow delayed trains and covered area roads. Harrisonburg, Virginia, received 10 inches (25 cm) of snow during a "raging blizzard" in the night of January 8. Baltimore, Maryland, was blanketed by 9 inches (23 cm) of snow. Pittsburgh, Pennsylvania, recorded 18.5 inches (47 cm) of snow from this storm, which was its heaviest snowfall on record at the time (this snowfall has since fallen to fifth place).

Up to 24 inches (61 cm) of snow fell in parts of Long Island, with 11.9 inches (30 cm) falling in Central Park. As the system moved through New England, snowfall appeared concentrated along the cyclone's path, with areas of over 15 inches (38 cm) measured across southeast Connecticut and northeast Massachusetts. A separate maximum of over 10 inches (25 cm) was noted across central Vermont. A 7:1 snow to liquid ratio (or 7 cm/in of snow for every 1 cm/in of rain) was determined from an average of the available snowfall and liquid equivalent measurements made at the time. Montreal experienced blizzard conditions with heavy snow and wind on January 9.

== Cold wave in its wake ==
A significant chunk of Arctic air from the north filtered down into the South in the wake of this system. Corpus Christi, Texas, saw its temperature plunge by 64 °F (18 °C) within 12 hours. Palestine, Texas, fell to 0 °F (−18 °C), its coldest temperature in 40 years. Nashville, Tennessee, recorded five consecutive days with lows below 0 °F (−18 °C) between January 8 and January 12, with a minimum of −9 °F (−23 °C) on January 11. Chattanooga, Tennessee, fell to −5 °F (−21 °C) on January 9, its coldest reading on record at the time. On January 11, the temperature at Jasper, Alabama, fell to 0 °F (−18 °C). Portions of North Carolina saw temperatures fall well below 0 °F (−18 °C) from January 11 through 14, with readings as low at −18 °F (−28 °C) in Wilkes County on January 12.
