= Calobata =

Scientific classification
- Kingdom: Animalia
- Phylum: Arthropoda
- Clade: Pancrustacea
- Class: Insecta
- Order: Diptera
- Family: Micropezidae
- Subfamily: Calobatinae
- Genus: Calobata; Meigen, 1803

Synonyms
- Trepidaria Meigen, 1800

Genus of flies

Calobata antennipes

Calobata is a genus of flies belonging to the family Micropezidae. The genus was first described by Meigen in 1803. The species of this genus are found in Europe and North America.

Species include:

- Calobata petronella
