= Fence Cutting Wars =

American land disputes

The Fence Cutting Wars occurred near the end of the 19th century in the American Old West, and were a series of disputes between farmers and cattlemen with larger land holdings. As newcomers came to the American West to farm, established cattlemen began to fence off their larger tracts of land with barbed wire in order to protect them from the farmers' claims. The settlers viewed this as a closing of the open range, and began to cut fences to attempt to reclaim lands in the public domain. The ensuing, widespread series of conflicts was known as the Fence Cutting Wars.

== Background ==
Under the Homestead Act of 1862, the United States government offered 160 acres (65 ha) of lands in the west to those willing to reside on and improve their land. Farmers who were seeking cheap, plentiful land on which to raise herds of cattle flocked west. Some of these men accumulated more cattle than others, and companies or syndicates began to invest in the big cattle operations. Those with larger holdings of cattle were known as "cattle kings," "cattlemen," or "cattle barons."

=== Advent of barbed wire ===
Barbed wire, which was patented in 1874, was revolutionary in allowing farmers to protect their claims, crops, and livestock, particularly as the land started to fill up and competition for rights to and use of the land intensified. Barbed wire was a farmer's product at first, but cattlemen eventually adopted it to fence off their larger tracts of land. Barbed wire became an important factor in changing the cattle industry, as the free, open range became parceled off by barbed wire. Because of this development, the West saw the rise of big-pasture companies.

=== Causes of conflict ===
By the 1880s, newcomers' livestock were beginning to overcrowd the herds of the larger cattlemen. The cattle kings began to fence off their lands to protect access to the rangelands and water, which infuriated many homesteaders. There were many cases when large ranch owners not only fenced the property over which they claimed ownership, but also property considered public land. Some homesteaders retaliated by cutting the barbed wire of the fenced areas to give their livestock access to these lands, prompting the fence-cutting wars. Fence cutters were usually small-scale stockmen or farmers who used the free range and resented its appropriation, but also resented the fact that their stock could get tangled in the fences, injuring or killing the animals.

== Scope ==
The resulting Fence Cutting Wars were not confined to a particular area in the West, although some areas saw more intense clashes than others. According to historian Walter Prescott Webb, "Fence-cutter wars broke out in Texas, Wyoming, New Mexico – wherever men began to fence." Struggles had erupted in Texas as early as 1881, but spread to Colorado, Wyoming, and Montana in the later 1880s. For example, in Wyoming in 1883, a court ordered a big cattle company to stop fencing public lands and to remove the fences it had built around certain sections. Yet, by 1885, barbed wire had basically overrun the eastern parts of the Wyoming Territory, which meant that legal efforts to stop the fencing of the West were a losing battle. In other parts of the country, however, the Fence Cutting Wars raged on until the late 1880s and early 1890s.

=== Texas ===
In Texas, the Fence Cutting Wars were especially fierce. In 1883, a drought early in the year caused non-land owning cattlemen to become desperate, since fenced properties made it difficult to find the water and grass necessary to support their herds. The conflict was worse in Texas because the state entered the union in possession of its own lands, so people felt that their right to public access was assured – the land was for everyone to share.

Fence cutting soon erupted as a result of the cattlemen with vast lands using barbed wire to fence their land, cutting off roads and access to public lands. The cuttings were well organized, with armed guards posted to protect the men while they worked. In 1883, fence cutting was reported in more than half the counties in Texas. To stop the fence-cutters, the state and local authorities tried many different methods. Counties offering rewards, shootouts between landowners and fence cutters, and legal trials were all different ways in which people tried to stop the fence cutters, but the conflict persisted. The fence cutters had substantial local support, and on occasion, found powerful outside allies. For instance, the New York and Texas Land Company was making profits by selling their land to homesteaders, and hence supported fence-cutting campaigns against the cattlemen. Local newspapers lined up either for or against the fence cutters.

During 1883, groups of cowboys calling themselves names such as the Owls, Javelinas, or Blue Devils, were cutting fences. By the middle of that year, ranchers were employing armed bands to battle the anti-fence cowboys, and the Texas Rangers were dispatched to the area. By the fall of 1883, more than 20 million dollars in damage had been caused by the fence cutters across the state. In January 1884, Governor John Ireland called for a special assembly of the state legislature, which passed a bill mandating prison sentences for those caught fence cutting. Property owners were ordered to remove fences placed across property they did not own, provide gates every three miles, and keep the gates in good repair. By the mid 1880s, large-scale fence cutting in Texas had essentially ended.

=== New Mexico ===
Another notable case occurred in San Miguel County, New Mexico. In the American Southwest, there were tensions between two ethnic groups, the Mexicanos and Anglos, and particularly between the former and the large Anglo land companies and cattlemen taking control of public lands in the 1880s. The fence cutting movement that broke out was primarily led by smaller-scale Mexicano farmers.

The conflict was sparked when Philip Millhiser purchased land from owners who possessed it under the earlier Las Vegas Land Grant. The plaintiff claimed he not only had ownership of the fields he had bought, but also to the common land of the grant. The defendants argued that it would take community assent to grant the common land to one particular owner. In the two years following 1887, during which the court case Millhiser v. Padilla was under consideration to determine the outcome of Millhiser's suit, Anglo owners continued to build new fences to enclose large portions of grant land in amounts that ranged from 1,000 to more than 10,000 acres (40 km^{2}). In effect, the precedent of taking common lands had already been set even before the court made a ruling. These conflicts turned violent, with fence-cuttings, shootings, and the burning of a farm.

In response, 21 fence cutters were indicted on 26 counts on May 3, 1889. The district attorney, the probate judge, and the assessor were opposed to the fence cutters and argued for the strongest measures possible to stop them. The presiding Judge Long was also a successful businessman who wanted to encourage economic growth in the region, and encouraged the jury to bring a stern verdict. However, vigilantes surrounded the courthouse and the jail to show their support for the indicted men, and the jury soon delivered a verdict of not guilty for one man, whereupon the charges for the other 20 were then dismissed. The Las Vegas Daily Optic, which was the leading newspaper in the county (and Republican-leaning), warned that the surge in fence cutting "show[ed] with what jealousy the people watch the fencing of large tracts of lands, which they, with some color of reason, regard as public." The outbreak of fence cutting, which resulted when the legal system did not adequately address the fencing off of public lands, continued in other areas of the country as well. Farmers who filed land-use petitions grew increasingly desperate when local authorities did not respond quickly or effectively to their claims, and then resorted to more violent tactics. But in the end, these techniques were not effective in stopping the fencing of public lands, such as when organized violence died down and was replaced by political gridlock in New Mexico.

== Aftermath ==
The implications of the Fence Cutting Wars were numerous. They represented the last attempts toward keeping the open range alive. After the Fence Cutting Wars, Western settlement continued to grow denser and barbed wire crossed more and more of the formerly open range. Illegal fence building would become more common than fence cutting, as barbed wire continued to make its way across the region. As scholar Susanne Bentley puts it, barbed wire "closed off land, closed people in, and enabled some people to acquire land illegally."

The damages caused by fence-cutting was estimated to be $20 million by the fall of 1883. At least three people, as well as a Texas Ranger named Ben Warren, had died in the conflict. The spokesmen for the rich ranchers, who were abusing barbed wire to fence huge spaces for themselves, held a meeting with the fence-cutters. They settled the conflict by agreeing to remove fences from across public roads and land not owned or leased by the former, and to allow the fence-cutters passage through the gates, in return for an end to the wire-cutting. However, the effects it caused in Western economy was so problematic that it prompted Governor John Ireland to conduct a special session of the legislature to meet on January 8, 1884. The legislature made fence-cutting and pasture-burning felonies punishable by up to five years in prison. They also made fencing of public land a misdemeanor and required the removal of any such fences within six months. The conflicts of the Fence Cutting Wars, however, showed the resistance to this way of life, an unease that would be reflected in ensuing range wars throughout the late 19th century West.

== See also ==
- Mabel Doss Day Lea

== Works cited ==
- Bentley, Susanne (1998). "How the West was Wired". In Tchudi, Stephen (ed.). Western Technological Landscapes. University of Nevada Press. pp. 17–35. ISBN 978-1-890591-02-1.
- Gard, Wayne (1947–1948). "The Fence-Cutters". The Southwestern Historical Quarterly. 51 (1): 1.
- Graybill, Andrew (Summer 2005). "Rural Police and the Defense of the Cattleman's Empire in Texas and Alberta, 1875-1900". Agricultural Historical Society. 79 (3): 255. JSTOR 3745069.
- Johnson, Marilynn S. (2014) [2009]. Violence in the West: The Johnson County Range War and the Ludlow Massacre—A Brief History with Documents. Waveland Press. ISBN 978-1-4786-2304-5.
- Liu, Joanne S. (2009). Barbed Wire: The Fence that Changed the West. Mountain Press Publishing Company. ISBN 978-0-87842-557-0.
- Rosenbaum, Robert J. (1981). Mexicano Resistance in the Southwest. Southern Methodist University Press. ISBN 978-0-87074-429-7.
- Webb, Walter Prescott (1959) [1931]. The Great Plains. U of Nebraska Press. ISBN 0-8032-9702-5.
