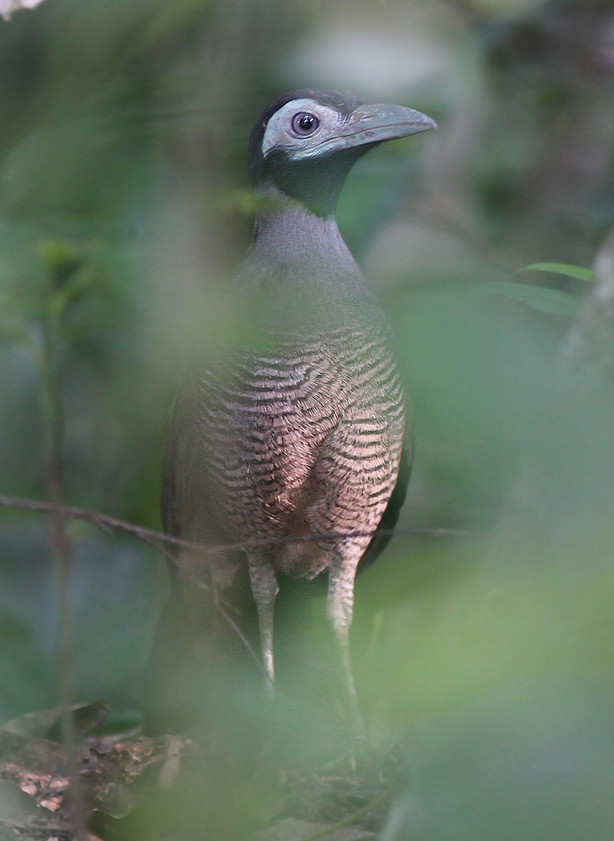

Conservation status
- Vulnerable (IUCN 3.1)

Scientific classification
- Kingdom: Animalia
- Phylum: Chordata
- Class: Aves
- Order: Cuculiformes
- Family: Cuculidae
- Genus: Carpococcyx
- Species: C. radiceus

Binomial name
- Carpococcyx radiceus (Temminck, 1832)

Synonyms
- Carpococcyx radiatus (Temminck, 1832)

= Bornean ground cuckoo =

Species of bird

The Bornean ground cuckoo (Carpococcyx radiceus) is a large, terrestrial species of cuckoo in the family Cuculidae. As suggested by its common name, it is endemic to the island of Borneo, being found in the sections belonging to Brunei, Malaysia, and Indonesia. It is restricted to humid forest. It is threatened by habitat loss. It was formerly considered conspecific with the Sumatran ground cuckoo.

== Taxonomy and systematics ==
The Bornean ground cuckoo was described as Calobates radiceus by the Dutch zoologist Coenraad Jacob Temminck in 1832 based on a female specimen from Pontianak district in Borneo. In 1840, George Robert Gray established it as the type species of a new genus, Carpococcyx, because Calobates was similar to the fly genus Calobata. Additionally, it is also a junior homonym of the genus Calobates, established by the German naturalist Johann Jacob Kaup in 1829. The specific name, radiceus, is either from the Neo-Latin radius (rod or staff) or radicis (foundation). It is thought to be an error for radiatus or radiosus, with Temminck himself referring to the species by those names in other writings, but the original description does not provide enough evidence to emend the name. Nevertheless, some authorities use radiatus as the specific epithet.
