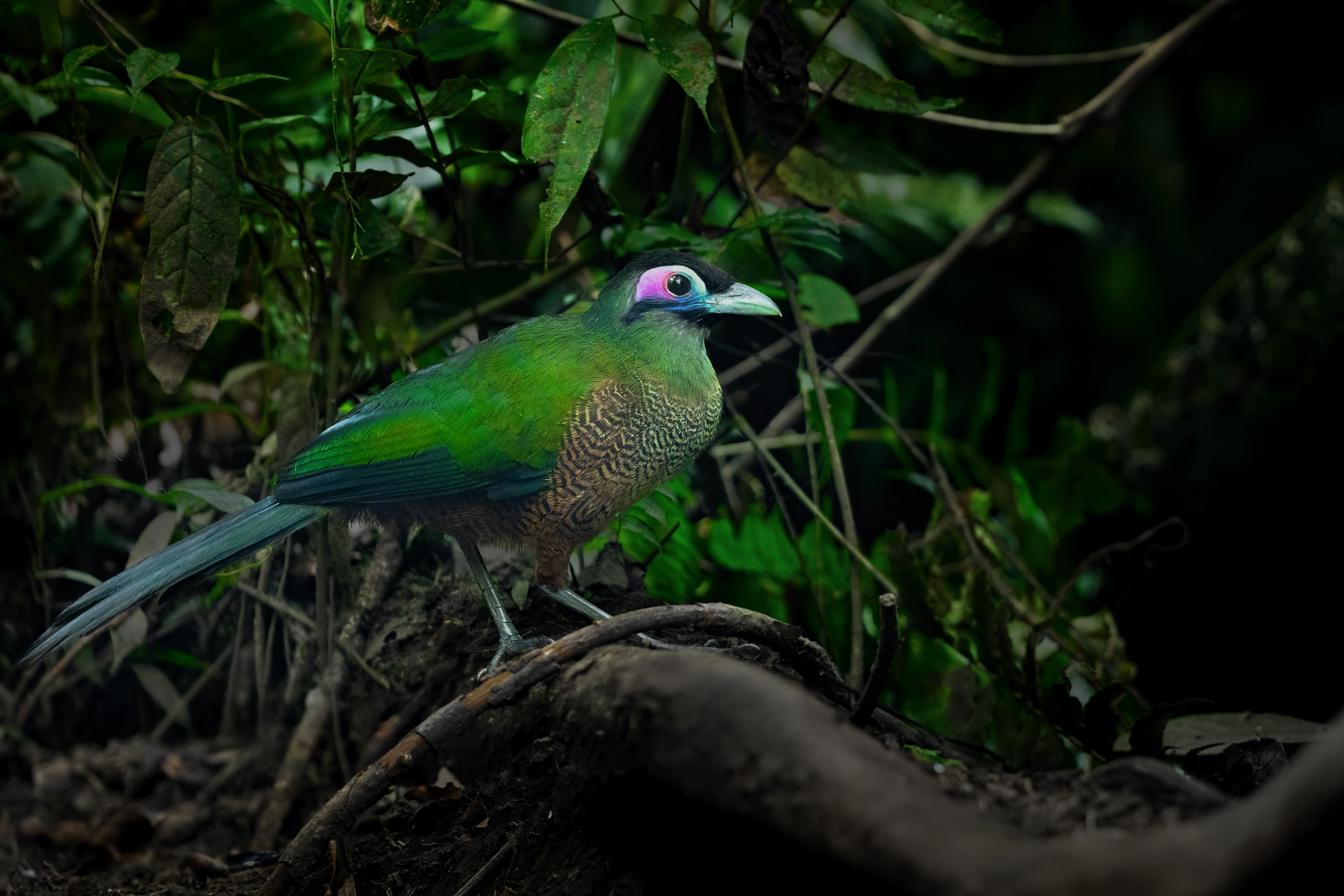

Conservation status
- Endangered (IUCN 3.1)

Scientific classification
- Kingdom: Animalia
- Phylum: Chordata
- Class: Aves
- Order: Cuculiformes
- Family: Cuculidae
- Genus: Carpococcyx
- Species: C. viridis

Binomial name
- Carpococcyx viridis Salvadori, 1879

= Sumatran ground cuckoo =

Species of bird

The Sumatran ground cuckoo (Carpococcyx viridis) is a large, terrestrial species of cuckoo endemic to the forests of Sumatra in Indonesia. It was first described in 1879 and, despite being identified as a separate species in the 1880s, was formerly considered conspecific with the Bornean ground cuckoo until recently being returned to the status of a unique species. Considered endangered species by the IUCN Red List, it was initially known from just eight specimens and evaded notice from 1916 until 1997, when it was rediscovered and photographed. The Sumatran ground cuckoo's diet is thought to consist of invertebrates, small mammals, and reptiles.

== Description ==
The Sumatran ground cuckoo is a large bird of about 55 cm (22 in) in length. Its wings and long, full tail are glossy greenish-black, while its mantle, upper back, neck sides, lower throat, upper breast, covert feathers, and secondary feathers are dull green. Its crown is black, and the bare skin around its eyes are hues of green, lilac, and blue. Its bill and legs are green, and its underparts below the upper breast are cinnamon buff. BirdLife International describes its voice as follows: "Repeated low whistles (falling then rising in tone: WE-ow-WE), plus issued in a rising series (we-ow-we, we-ow-we, we-ow-we, we-ow-we; each phrase slightly higher than last)."

== Distribution and habitat ==
The Sumatran ground cuckoo is endemic to the Indonesian island of Sumatra. Notes on early specimen labels as well as recent sightings suggest its favoured habitat is foothills and primary montane forest. It has been found between elevations of 300 and 1,400 m (975 and 4,600 ft), although recent sightings are exclusively from 800–1,000 m (2,600–3,300 ft). Its small population makes it difficult to find, and like the Bornean ground cuckoo, it may exhibit unobtrusive behavior – making sightings even more rare.

Most modern-day sightings have taken place in the Barisan Mountains in South Sumatra and the Kerinci Seblat National Park of Jambi province, beginning with an individual photographed in Bukit Barisan Selatan National Park in 1997. An additional unconfirmed sighting took place in the Bukit Rimbang-Baling Wildlife Sanctuary in 2000. In 2007, its call was recorded for the first time by Wildlife Conservation Society biologists after a trapper handed them a bird he had caught. Up to five more sightings were reported nearby between 2007 and 2010. In 2017, a camera trap in Batang Gadis National Park took a photo of a Sumatran ground cuckoo, indicating that a previously unknown population may exist in North Sumatra.

== Status and conservation ==
Due to ongoing habitat loss and small population size, the IUCN Red List evaluates the Sumatran ground cuckoo as endangered. The Red List estimates that the total population of Sumatran ground cuckoos ranges from 50 to 249 mature individuals, and its population is thought to be decreasing. The bird's known range overlaps with some of the Barisan Mountains' 20 protected areas, but rapid deforestation – its main threat – is prevalent even in these areas. A 2003 study showed an average 2% loss of forest within Bukit Barisan Selatan National Park, part of its known range, between 1985 and 1999. This deforestation is caused predominantly by logging, palm oil plantations, pulpwood plantations, establishment of farms, and wildfires. The species likely benefits from protected areas, but its conservation needs are not fully understood due to a lack of study.
