= Big Die-Up =

Weather event (1885–1887)

In the Big Die-Up (or Great Die-Up), hundreds of thousands of cattle on the Great Plains of the United States died during the unusually cold and snowy winters of 1885–1886 and 1886–1887. Many ranchers were bankrupted as a result and the era of the open range in which cattle roamed unfenced on the plains began its decline.

== Background ==
The Great Plains. Most of the large cattle ranches were located west of the 100th meridian.

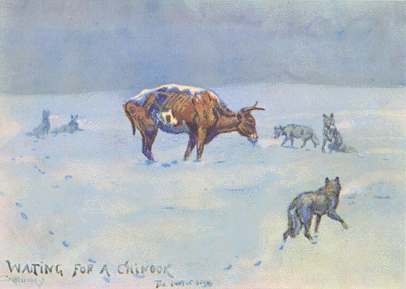
Waiting for a Chinook, by C.M. Russell. Overgrazing and harsh winters were the factors that caused the Big Die-Up.

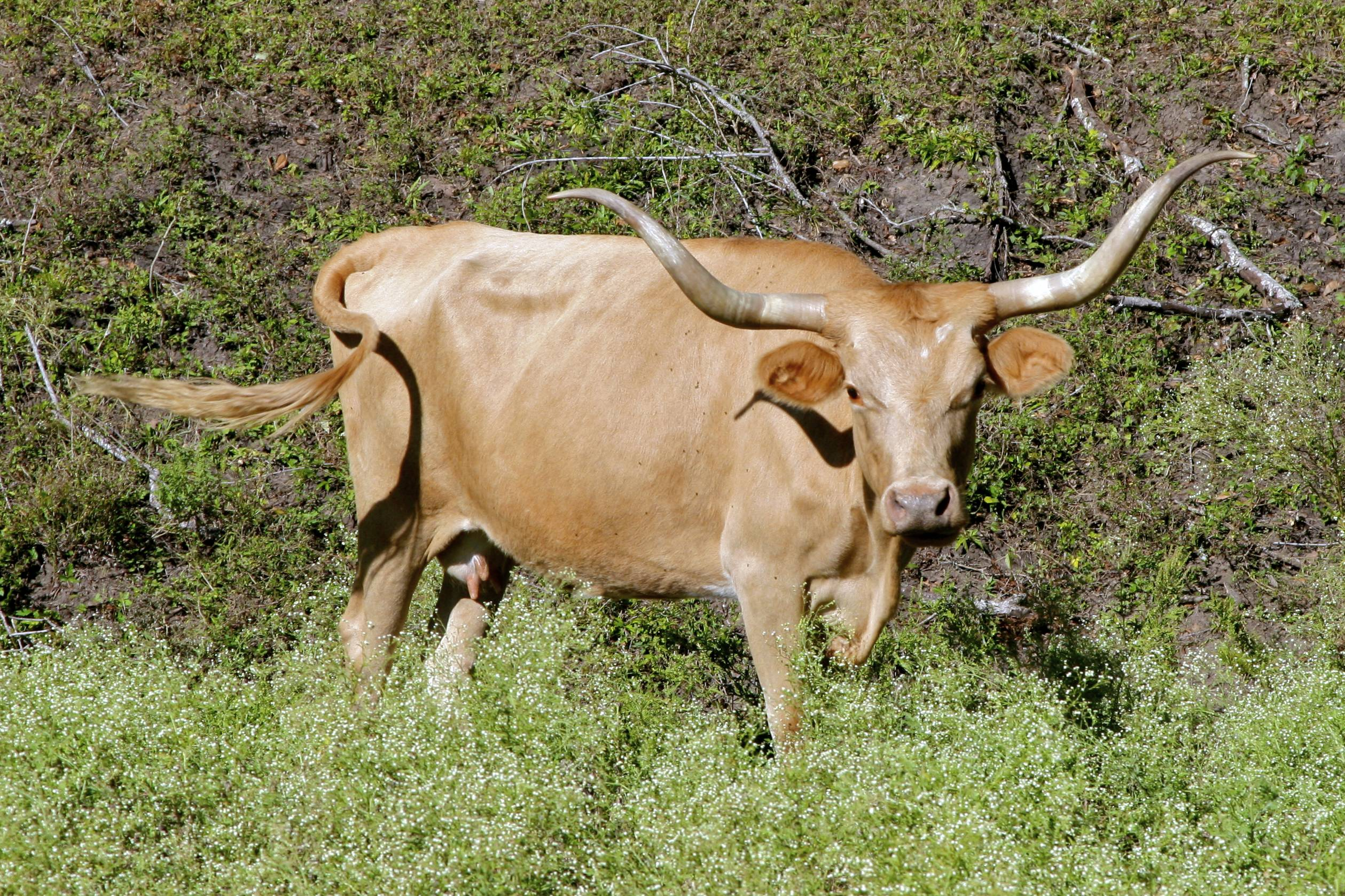
Most of the cattle on the Great Plains in the 1880s were Texas Longhorns.

The near-extinction of the bison by hunters and the defeat of the Comanche, Lakota, Cheyenne and other Plains Indian tribes after the American Civil War (1861–1865) opened up the last large acreages of land for cattle ranching on the Great Plains from the Canadian border on the north to the Texas panhandle in the south. Northern plains ranches were stocked with cattle from Texas. In 1868, cattle were first driven north from Texas to ranches in Nebraska. In eastern Montana and the western part of the Dakotas, settlement of ranches began in the 1870s. In 1876, Charles Goodnight established a ranch in Palo Duro Canyon in Texas (the heart of former Comanche land) and soon the Texas panhandle was dotted with large cattle ranches.

After the Indians were forced onto reservations and their former lands became available to ranchers, the cattle industry boomed from 1880 to 1885. Most of the land was vacant, publicly owned, and available to whoever chose to occupy it. Prices for beef were high, land was free, and domestic and foreign investors rushed into the business. Investors believed that "no other business is so safe nor so profitable as cattle raising." The land in 1880 was unfenced open range. Cattle drifted with the seasons and sought out good grazing until rounded up by cowboys and herded to railroad terminals from where they were transported to eastern markets. Among the investors was future-president Theodore Roosevelt who established two ranches in western North Dakota in 1883 and 1884.

The Big Die-up impacted both the northern and southern Great Plains. The winter of 1885–1886 was mild on the northern plains but the blizzard of January 1886 was catastrophic for ranchers on the southern plains. The winter of 1886–1887 had a wider impact with the Big Die-up killing hundreds of thousands of cattle and bankrupting many ranchers on both the northern and southern plains.

== Texas and the 1886 blizzard ==
In 1875 the Indian tribes of the southern Great Plains had been relocated to Indian Territory (Oklahoma). The Texas panhandle was open to white settlement and by 1880 ranches had been established throughout the panhandle. The severe winter of 1880–1881 caused many cattle in Kansas, Colorado, and Nebraska to migrate southward in search of shelter and good grazing. They competed with locally owned cattle, putting pressure on pastures. The Panhandle Stock Raisers Association decided to string drift fences of barbed wire from east to west across the northern edge of each rancher's range to prevent cattle from further north straying into the Panhandle. The longest of the drift fences stretched westward for 200 mi (320 km) from Higgins across the width of the Panhandle and into New Mexico.

In 1883, With the Texas panhandle already crowded with cattle, ranchers leased 3,000,000 acres (12,000 km^{2}) of land in Indian Territory from the Cheyenne and Arapaho tribes. Disputes resulted in the threat of violence between Indians and ranchers and in 1885 President Grover Cleveland ordered the ranchers to remove their cattle from Indian territory. This added more than 200,000 cattle to the already over-grazed land in the Texas panhandle and Kansas. "Pastures that could have sustained 'a cow on every 40 acres had one on every 10 acres.'"

Adding to the problems in 1885, prices for cattle fell and autumn was unseasonably dry. In November large wildfires burned grassland from the Arkansas River in Kansas southward to northeastern New Mexico, the Oklahoma panhandle, and the Texas panhandle. The grass that remained was insufficient to sustain the cattle on the range.

On January 1, 1886, a snowstorm dropped up to one foot (.30 m) of snow in western Kansas. On January 6, 1886, the United States Army Signal Corps, the predecessor of the National Weather Service, issued a warning of a cold wave descending onto the southern plains. That morning, Larned, Kansas enjoyed mild temperatures but by midnight the town closed down due to blizzard conditions. In Dodge City the temperature dropped to −16.2 °F (−26.8 °C) and Austin, Texas recorded a low of −6.5 °F (−21.4 °C) degrees. Heavy winds piled up snow two to three feet (.5 to 1.0 mts) deep in the Texas panhandle and New Mexico, closing roads for up to one month. Galveston Bay on the Gulf of Mexico froze.

Prior to the blizzard, an estimated 2.5 million cattle inhabited the southern plains. The cattle were prevented from migrating to sheltered and more southerly areas by the drift fences and their bodies piled up near the fences, in rivers, and along the railroads. Ranchers in New Mexico cut their fences to allow the cattle to seek shelter in sheltered valleys. Twenty-five percent of the cattle north of the Canadian River where drift fences were present are estimated to have died; south of the river the losses were only one percent. Individual ranchers often lost a larger percentage of their herds. Cowboys were put to work harvesting hides of dead cattle and 400,000 were marketed in Dodge City.

== The 1886–1887 winter ==
The impact of the blizzards in the southern plains in early 1886 was compounded by conditions later that year, especially on the northern plains. The summer and fall were dry and grass was in poor condition for grazing cattle. The first blizzard of winter occurred on November 22 and 23. Cattle had trouble digging through the snow to reach to grass underneath. In late December the weather turned very cold reaching an unofficial temperature of −35 °F (−37 °C) at Glendive, Montana. Bitterly cold weather returned in late January and a newspaper report said "more snow has fallen this year than any previous year in west Dakota." Bismarck, North Dakota reported temperatures of −43 °F (−42 °C) on February 1 and 12. The winter weather even reached the West Coast, with snowfall of 3.7 inches in downtown San Francisco setting an all-time record on February 5, 1887.

A chinook wind melted the snow in early March and ranchers began to assess the impact of the winter on their cattle. Some estimates were low (to reassure investors) but most ranchers estimated losses of 50 to 90 percent of their herds. Roosevelt's cattle ranches near Medora, Dakota Territory were among those hit hard by that winter. In a letter to his friend Henry Cabot Lodge, Roosevelt remarked "Well, we have had a perfect smashup all through the cattle country of the northwest. The losses are crippling. For the first time I have been utterly unable to enjoy a visit to my ranch. I shall be glad to get home." Many of the ranchers went broke. In Custer County, Montana the tax rolls in 1886 listed 200 ranchers; in 1888 the total was 120. The number of cattle shipped to eastern U.S. markets from Montana in 1887 was only two-thirds that of 1886 even though in 1887 ranchers engaged in panic selling of their remaining cattle in an effort to remain financially viable.

== Impact ==
Despite the losses and the poor condition of the grasslands, the plains recovered quickly—aided by the reduction in the number of cattle and favorable weather during the remainder of 1887 and 1888. Prices for cattle improved in 1888, but in the words of one historian "the days of the open range never returned." The Big Die-up caused changes in the ways of the cattlemen. Laws increasingly restricted the right of cattlemen to graze on "open" (publicly-owned) lands. The number of small scale ranchers proliferated. They built fences to enclose their herds and improved the quality of their cattle by introducing new breeds and providing them shelter, forage, and water rather than allowing them to roam freely. Ranching after the Big Die-up "became more a business, less a gamble."
