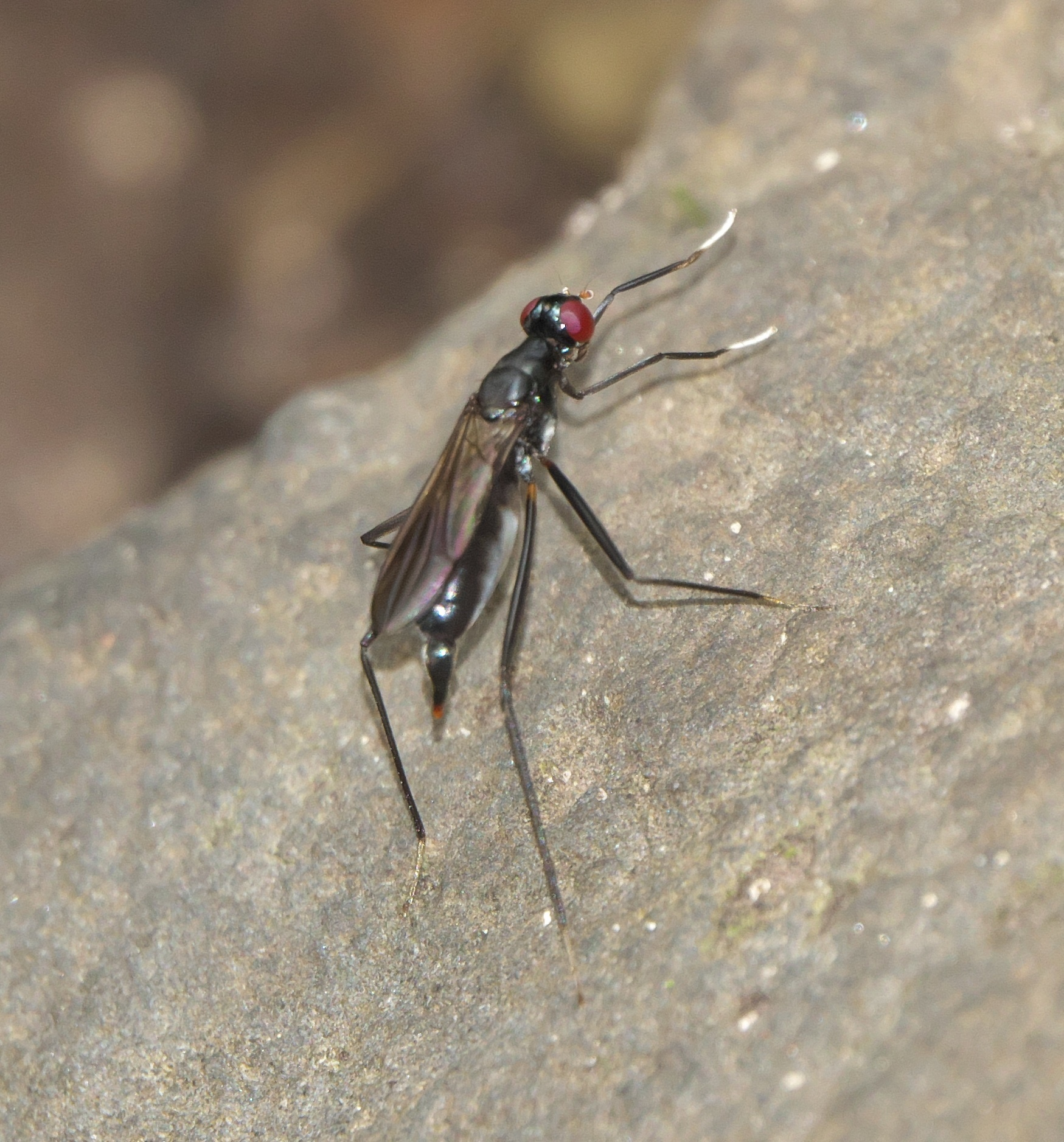
- Mimegralla, American Samoa

Scientific classification
- Domain: Eukaryota
- Kingdom: Animalia
- Phylum: Arthropoda
- Class: Insecta
- Order: Diptera
- Family: Micropezidae
- Subfamily: Taeniapterinae
- Genus: Mimegralla; Rondani, 1850

= Mimegralla =

Genus of flies

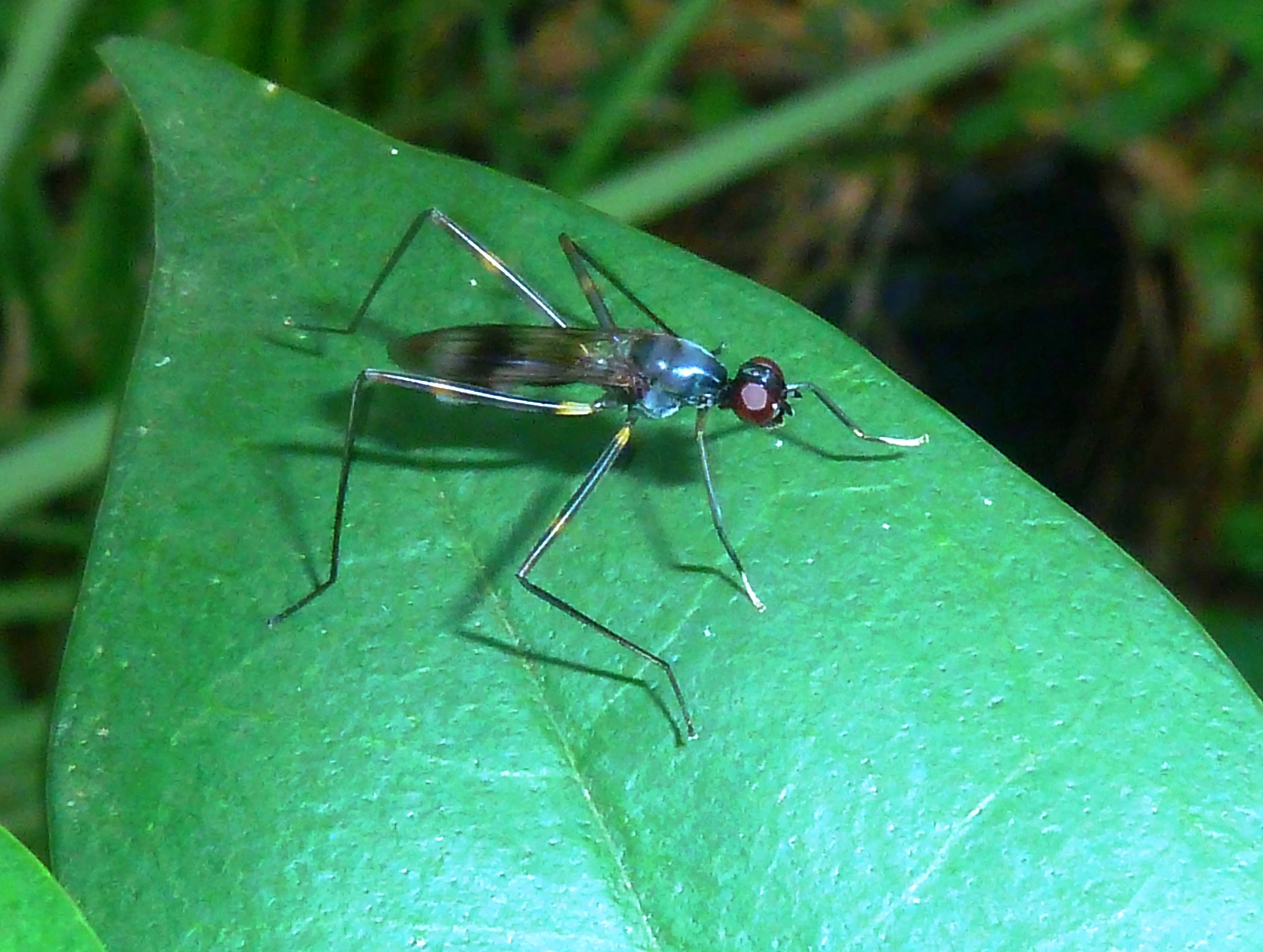
Mimegralla fuelleborni, South Africa

Mimegralla is a genus of stilt-legged flies in the family Micropezidae. There are more than 80 described species in Mimegralla, found in Indomalaya, Oceania, Africa, Pacific Islands, and Central and South America.

== Species ==
These 84 species belong to the genus Mimegralla:

- Mimegralla abana (Walker, 1849)
- Mimegralla africana (Bigot, 1886)
- Mimegralla albimanus (Doleschall, 1856)
- Mimegralla albipes Hennig, 1935
- Mimegralla albitarsis (Wiedemann, 1819)
- Mimegralla australica Hennig, 1935
- Mimegralla basilewskyi (Verbeke, 1956)
- Mimegralla baumanni (Enderlein, 1922)
- Mimegralla binghami (Enderlein, 1922)
- Mimegralla caligata (Rondani, 1875)
- Mimegralla cedens (Walker, 1856)
- Mimegralla choui (Li, Liu & Yang, 2012)
- Mimegralla chrysopleura (Osten Sacken, 1882)
- Mimegralla cinereipennis (Bigot, 1886)
- Mimegralla cocoensis McAlpine, 1998
- Mimegralla coeruleifrons (Macquart, 1844)
- Mimegralla confinis (Walker, 1856)
- Mimegralla conradti (Enderlein, 1922)
- Mimegralla contingens (Walker, 1864)
- Mimegralla cyanescens (Walker, 1861)
- Mimegralla deferens (Malloch, 1935)
- Mimegralla diffundens (Walker, 1861)
- Mimegralla ecruis (Li, Liu & Yang, 2012)
- Mimegralla elegans (Verbeke, 1951)
- Mimegralla extrema Hennig, 1935
- Mimegralla flavicoxa (Verbeke, 1951)
- Mimegralla formosana (Czerny, 1932)
- Mimegralla fuelleborni (Enderlein, 1922)
- Mimegralla galbula (Osten Sacken, 1882)
- Mimegralla gibbifera (Enderlein, 1922)
- Mimegralla gowgeyi (Frey, 1929)
- Mimegralla gutticollis (Walker, 1861)
- Mimegralla immiscens (Walker, 1864)
- Mimegralla immixta (Walker, 1856)
- Mimegralla incompleta (Frey, 1958)
- Mimegralla inornata (Czerny, 1932)
- Mimegralla kambaitiensis (Frey, 1958)
- Mimegralla korinchiensis (Edwards, 1919)
- Mimegralla laticeps (Verbeke, 1951)
- Mimegralla ledermanni Enderlein, 1922
- Mimegralla leucopeza (Wiedemann, 1824)
- Mimegralla lunaria (Osten Sacken, 1881)
- Mimegralla luteilabris (Rondani, 1875)
- Mimegralla lyra McAlpine, 1998
- Mimegralla macropus (Thomson, 1869)
- Mimegralla magnifica Hennig, 1935
- Mimegralla maynei (Verbeke, 1955)
- Mimegralla melanotica Hennig, 1935
- Mimegralla mobekensis (Curran, 1928)
- Mimegralla nietneri (Enderlein, 1922)
- Mimegralla nigrocincta (Meijere, 1924)
- Mimegralla niveitarsis (Czerny, 1932)
- Mimegralla novaehebrideana Steyskal, 1952
- Mimegralla orbitalis (Verbeke, 1951)
- Mimegralla pliosema (Speiser, 1915)
- Mimegralla prominens (Verbeke, 1951)
- Mimegralla prudens (Osten Sacken, 1881)
- Mimegralla pygmaea (Enderlein, 1922)
- Mimegralla resoluta (Walker, 1860)
- Mimegralla respondens (Walker, 1849)
- Mimegralla samoana (Czerny, 1932)
- Mimegralla scapulifera (Bigot, 1886)
- Mimegralla sepsoides (Walker, 1859)
- Mimegralla signaticollis (Enderlein, 1922)
- Mimegralla sinensis (Enderlein, 1922)
- Mimegralla solomonis Hennig, 1935
- Mimegralla spinosa (Steyskal, 1952)
- Mimegralla splendens (Wiedemann, 1830)
- Mimegralla stabilis (Walker, 1861)
- Mimegralla strenua (Walker, 1856)
- Mimegralla striatofasciata (Enderlein, 1922)
- Mimegralla stylophora (Schiner, 1868)
- Mimegralla subfasciata Hennig, 1935
- Mimegralla suzukiana (Matsumura, 1916)
- Mimegralla talamaui (Meijere, 1924)
- Mimegralla teroensis Hennig, 1935
- Mimegralla tessmanni (Enderlein, 1922)
- Mimegralla thaiensis Cresson, 1926
- Mimegralla tongana (Czerny, 1932)
- Mimegralla triannulata (Macquart, 1844)
- Mimegralla trisetosa (Verbeke, 1951)
- Mimegralla tuberosa (Verbeke, 1951)
- Mimegralla venusta (Enderlein, 1922)
- Mimegralla wittei (Verbeke, 1951)
