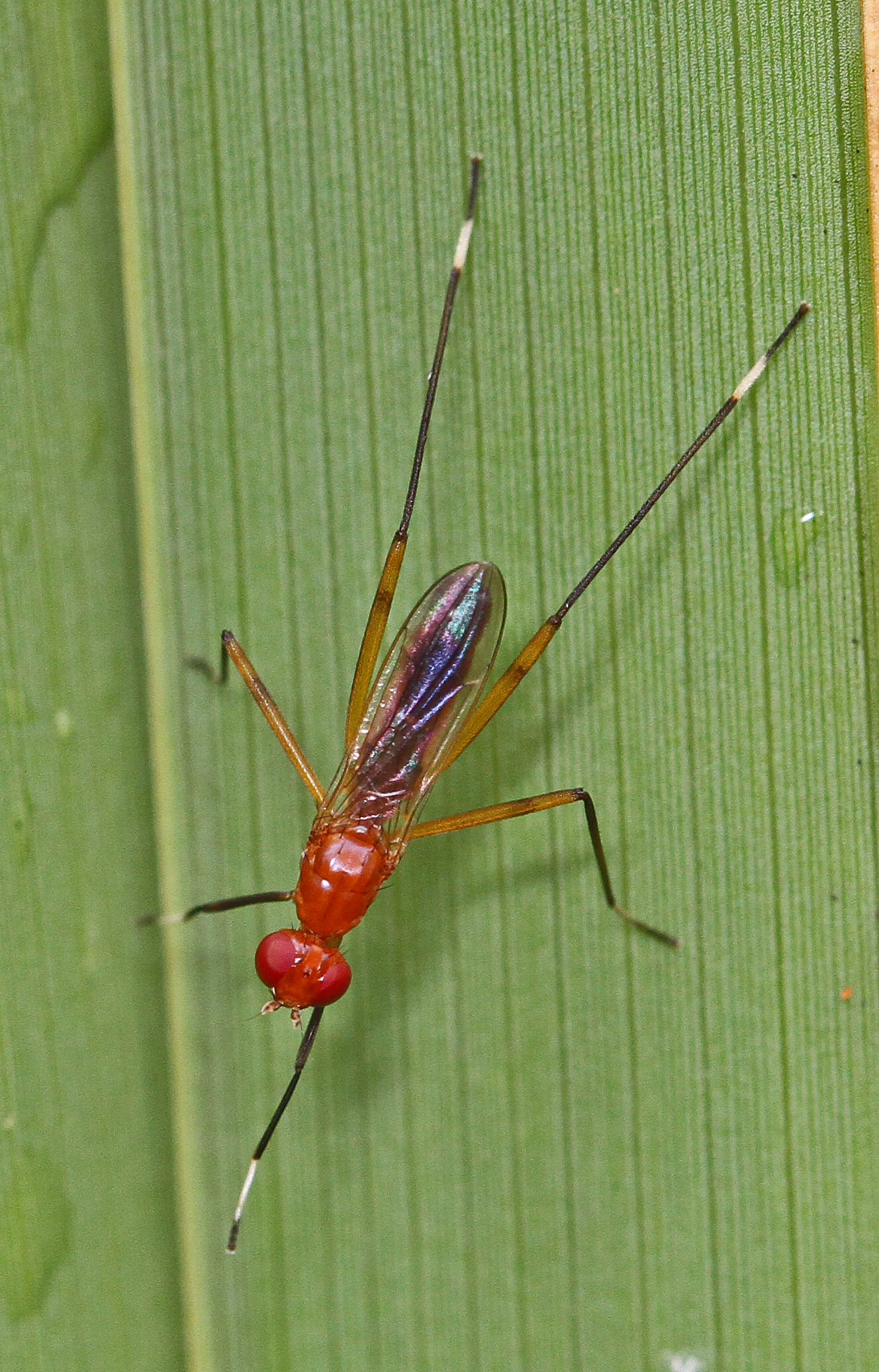

Scientific classification
- Domain: Eukaryota
- Kingdom: Animalia
- Phylum: Arthropoda
- Class: Insecta
- Order: Diptera
- Family: Micropezidae
- Genus: Grallipeza
- Species: G. nebulosa

Binomial name
- Grallipeza nebulosa Loew, 1866

= Grallipeza nebulosa =

Species of fly

Grallipeza nebulosa is a species of stilt-legged flies in the family Micropezidae.

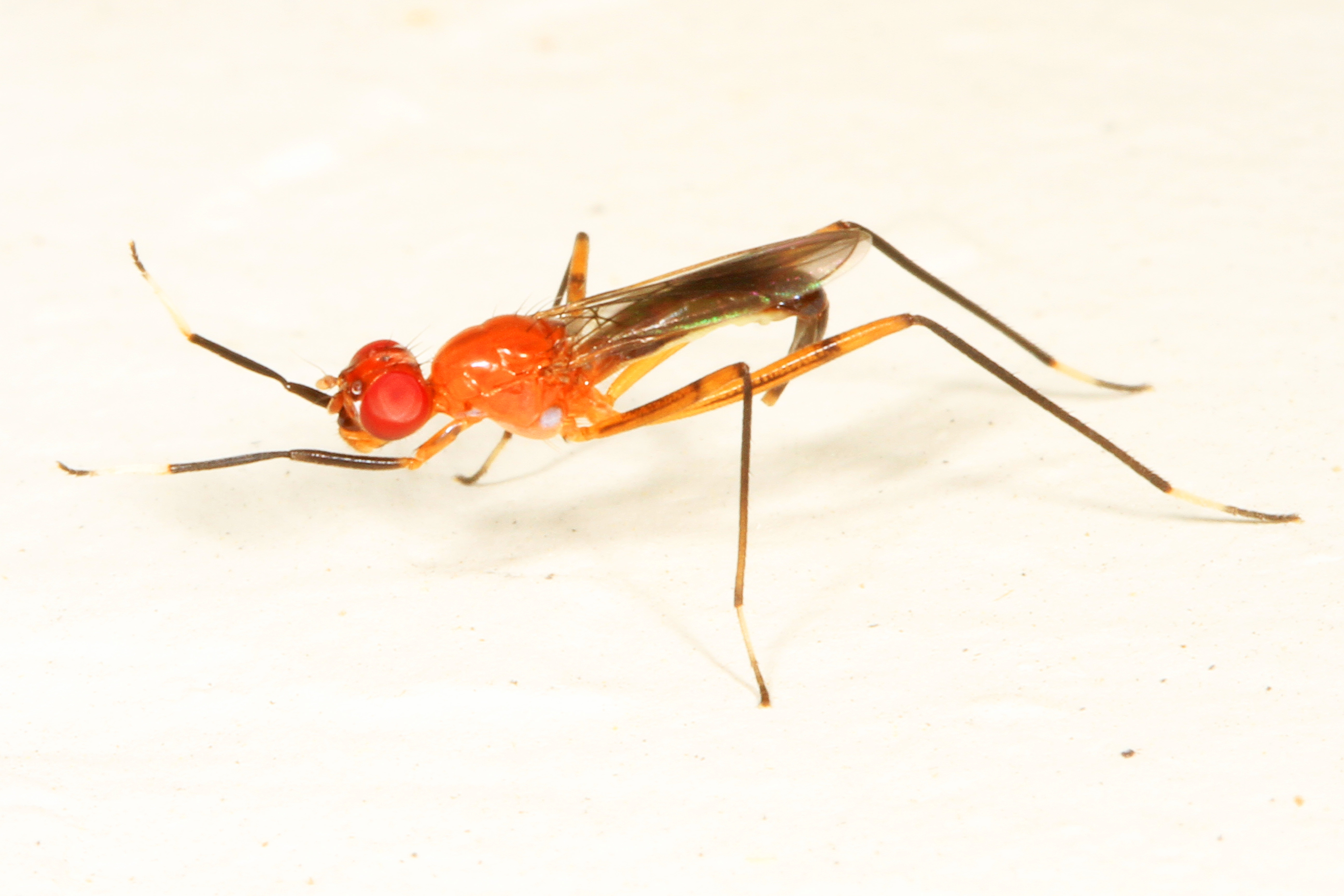
