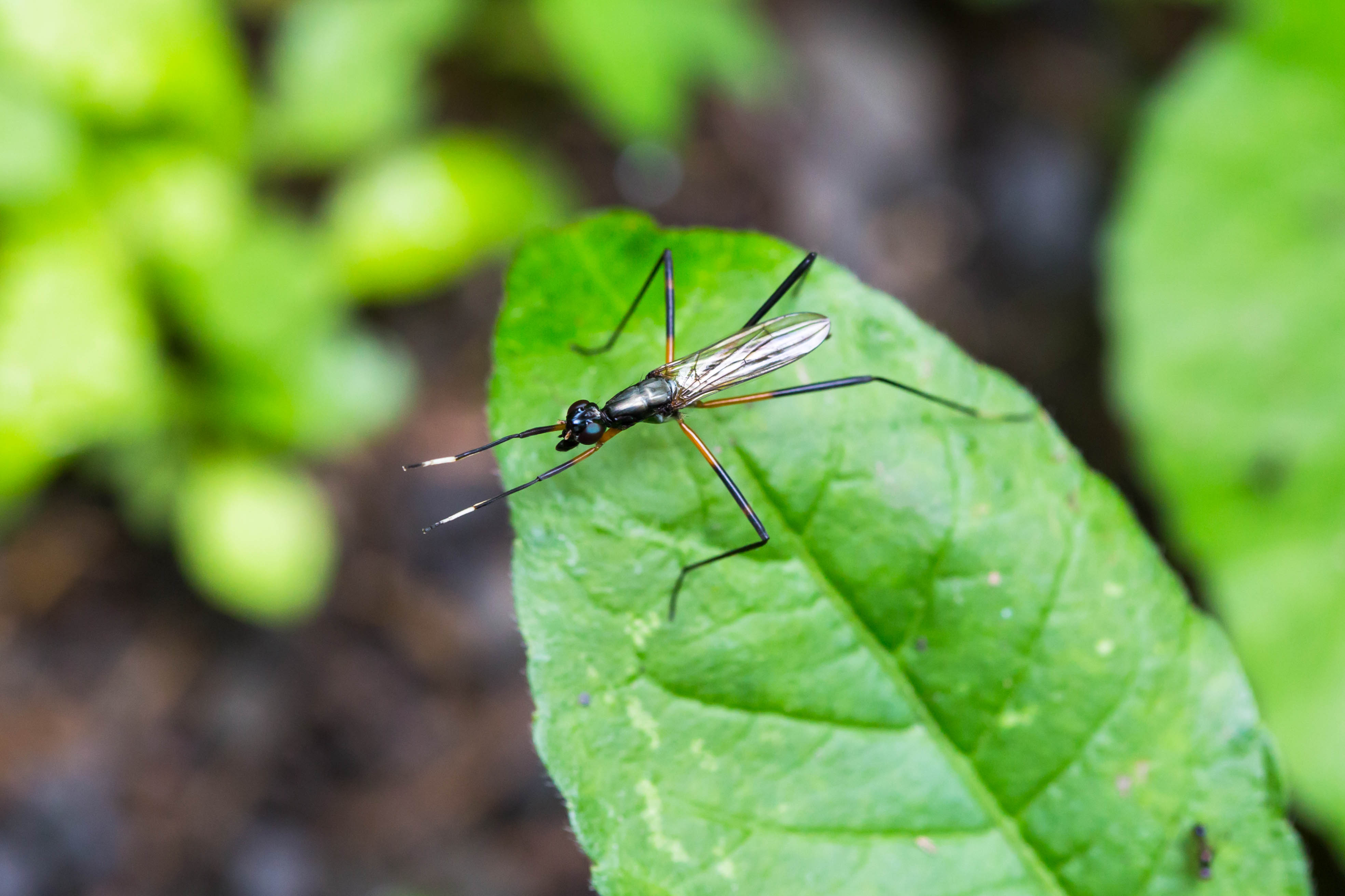

Scientific classification
- Kingdom: Animalia
- Phylum: Arthropoda
- Class: Insecta
- Order: Diptera
- Family: Micropezidae
- Genus: Calobatina
- Species: C. geometra

Binomial name
- Calobatina geometra (Robineau-Desvoidy, 1830)

Synonyms
- Calobatina texana Enderlein, 1922; Meganeria daeckei Cresson, 1926; Meganeria geometroides Cresson, 1926; Neria geometra Robineau-Desvoidy, 1830

= Calobatina geometra =

Species of fly

Calobatina geometra is a species of stilt-legged flies in the family Micropezidae.
