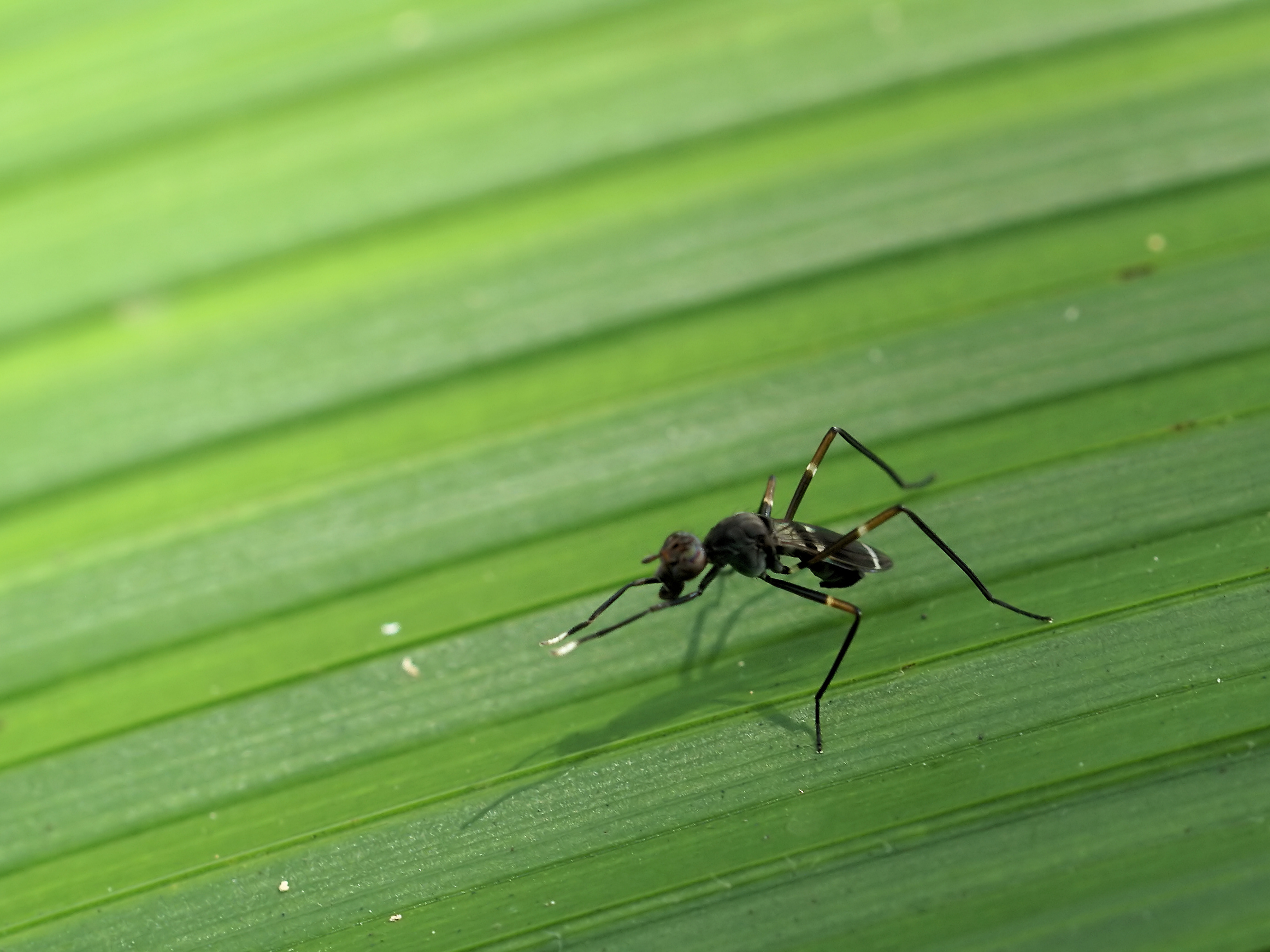
- Taeniaptera lasciva

Scientific classification
- Domain: Eukaryota
- Kingdom: Animalia
- Phylum: Arthropoda
- Class: Insecta
- Order: Diptera
- Family: Micropezidae
- Subfamily: Taeniapterinae
- Genus: Taeniaptera; Macquart, 1835

Type species
- Taeniaptera trivittata Macquart, 1835

Synonyms
- Grallomya Rondani, 1850; Grallopoda Rondani, 1850; Mitromyia Cresson, 1930; Paragrallomyia Hendel, 1933; Taenioptera Agassiz, 1846

= Taeniaptera =

Genus of flies

Taeniaptera is a genus of stilt-legged flies in the family Micropezidae. There are at least 3 described species in Taeniaptera.

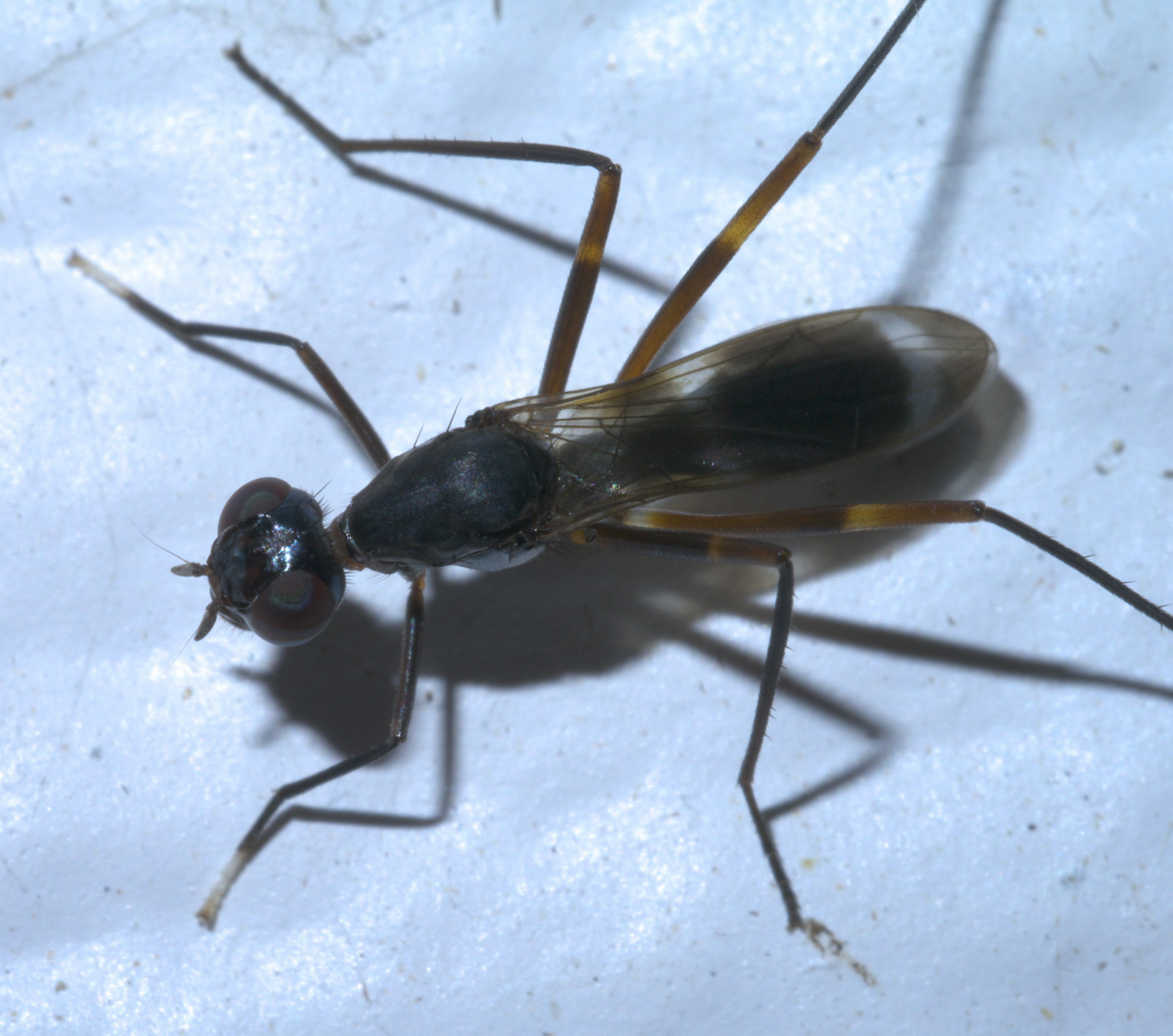
Taeniaptera trivittata

== Species ==
- Taeniaptera feei Steyskal, 1986 (palm grove stilt-legged fly)
- Taeniaptera lasciva (Fabricius, 1798)
- Taeniaptera trivittata Macquart, 1835
