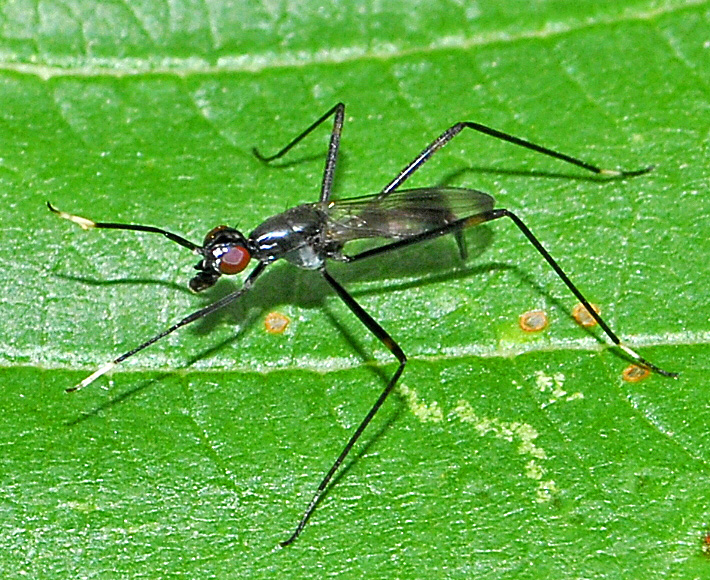
- Rainieria calceata. Dorsal view

Scientific classification
- Domain: Eukaryota
- Kingdom: Animalia
- Phylum: Arthropoda
- Class: Insecta
- Order: Diptera
- Family: Micropezidae
- Genus: Rainieria
- Species: R. calceata

Binomial name
- Rainieria calceata (Fallen, 1820)

Synonyms
- Calobata calceata Fallen, 1820; Rainiera calceata (Fallén, 1820)

= Rainieria calceata =

Species of fly

Rainieria calceata is a species of stilt-legged flies belonging to the family Micropezidae.

== Distribution and habitat ==
This species is present in Central and Western Europe (Albania, Austria, Belgium, Czech Republic, Denmark, Germany, Hungary, Italy, Romania, Slovakia, Sweden, Switzerland) and in the Near East. These stilt-legged flies are usually found in old forests. They are mainly associated with beech deciduous forests.

== Description ==
Rainieria calceata can reach a body length of about 5–10 millimetres (0.20–0.39 in). These stilt-legged flies have a very elongate, parallel-sided, slender black bodies. The head is small and rounded, with short antennae. The abdomen is black, long and narrow. They show characteristic long thin legs. The fore legs are markedly smaller than the other pairs. Femora are black at base. The tarsal segments of the first and third legs are white. The narrow wings are infuscated, with a dark tip and some darker markings.

== Biology ==
This species breeds and develops in moist organic debris and rotting wood in hollow tree-trunks.
