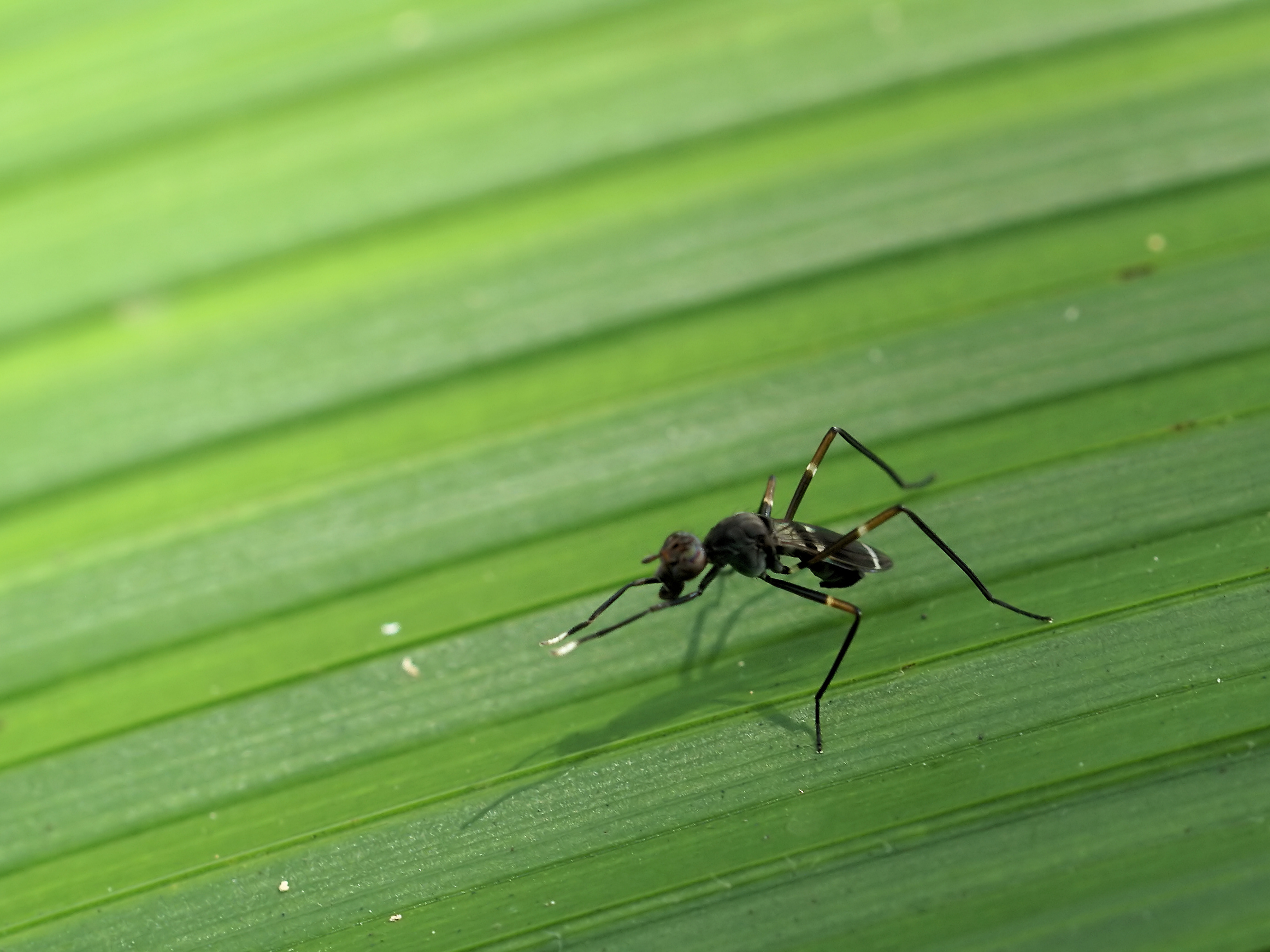

Scientific classification
- Domain: Eukaryota
- Kingdom: Animalia
- Phylum: Arthropoda
- Class: Insecta
- Order: Diptera
- Family: Micropezidae
- Genus: Taeniaptera
- Species: T. lasciva

Binomial name
- Taeniaptera lasciva (Fabricius, 1798)

Synonyms
- Musca lasciva Fabricius, 1798

= Taeniaptera lasciva =

Species of fly

Taeniaptera lasciva is a species of stilt-legged fly in the family Micropezidae.

== Subspecies ==
These two subspecies belong to the species Taeniaptera lasciva:

- Taeniaptera lasciva lasciva
- Taeniaptera lasciva obliterata Cresson
