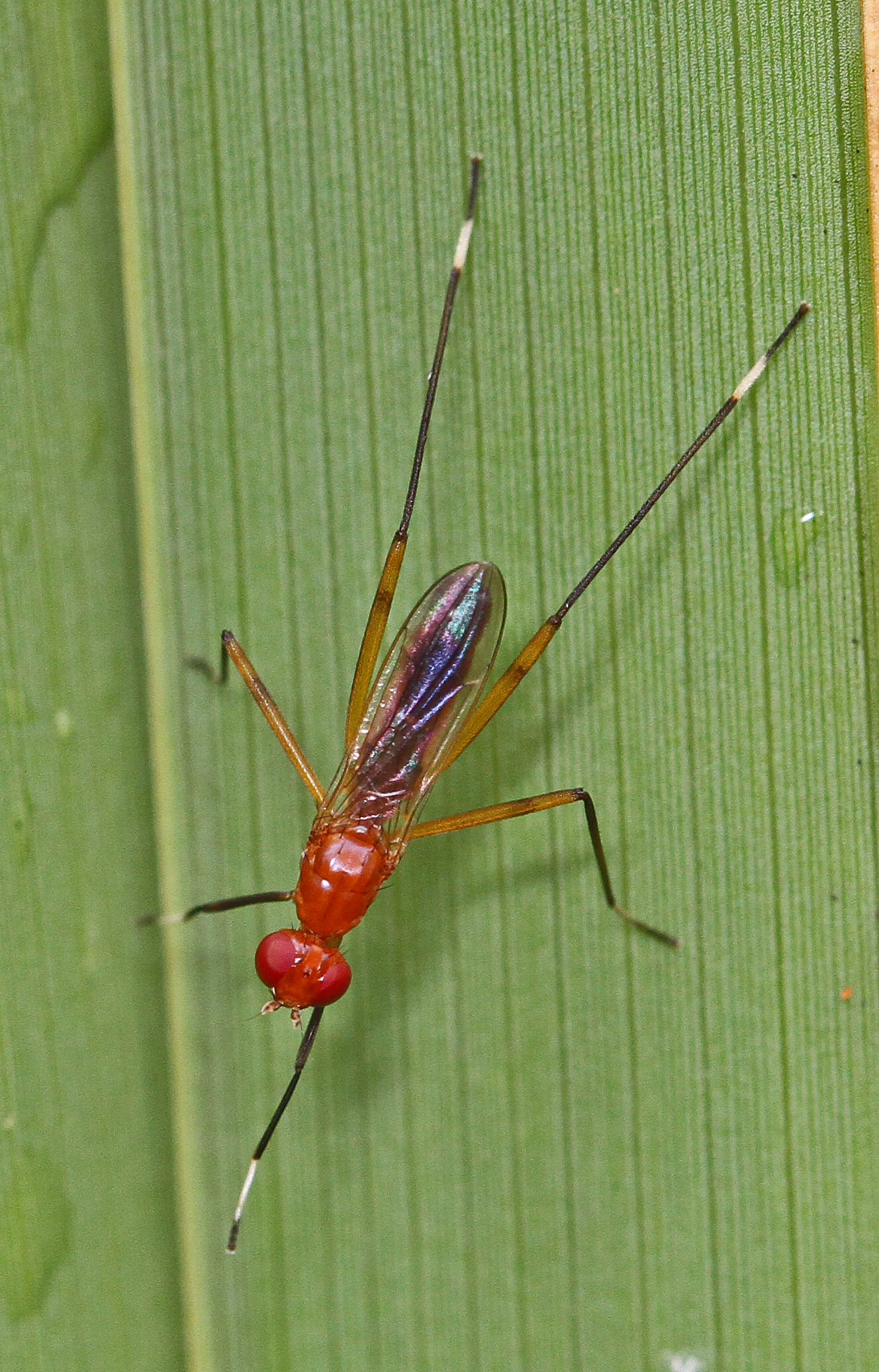
- Grallipeza nebulosa

Scientific classification
- Domain: Eukaryota
- Kingdom: Animalia
- Phylum: Arthropoda
- Class: Insecta
- Order: Diptera
- Family: Micropezidae
- Subfamily: Taeniapterinae
- Genus: Grallipeza; Rondani, 1850

= Grallipeza =

Genus of flies

Grallipeza is a genus of stilt-legged flies in the family Micropezidae. There are at least 40 described species in Grallipeza.

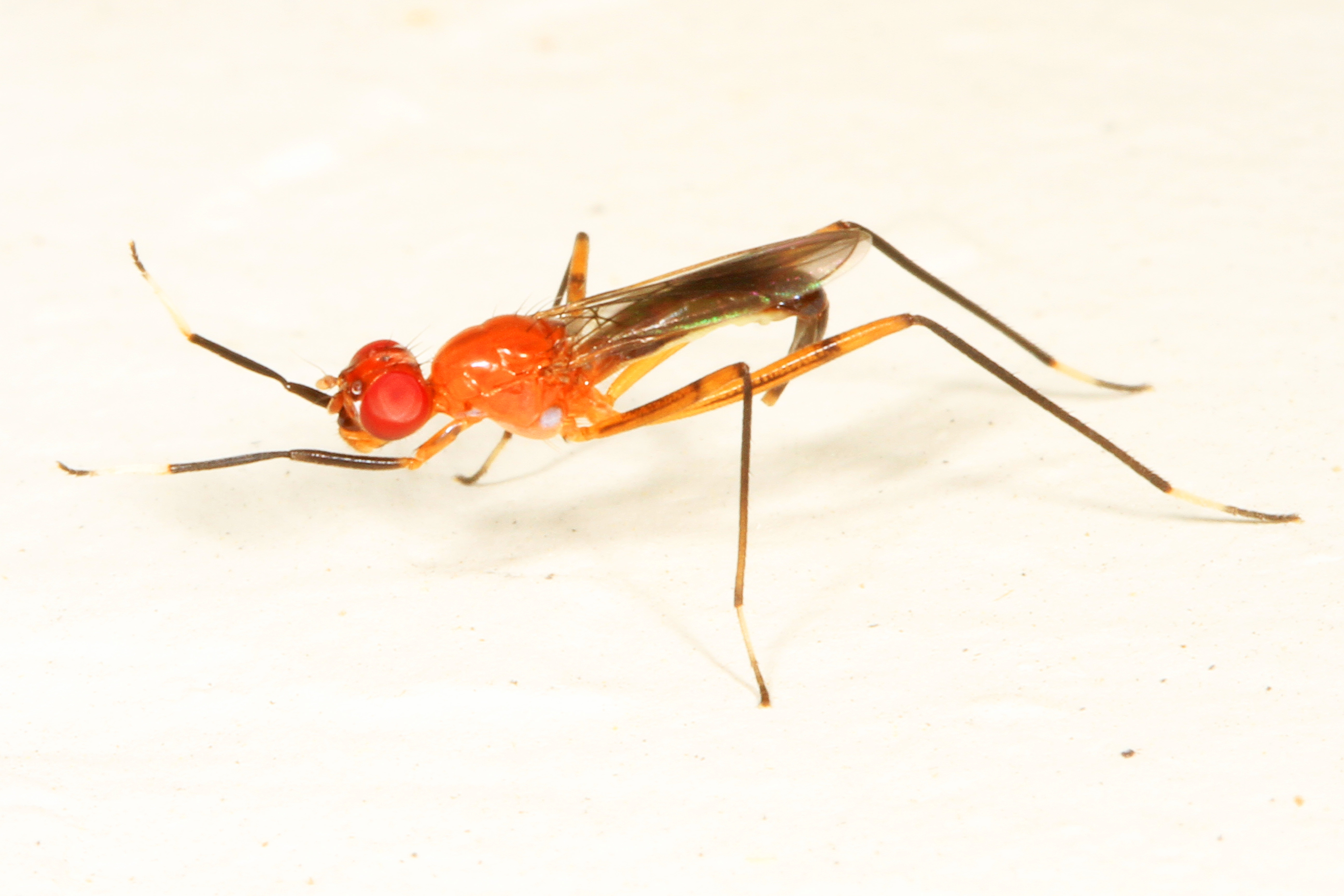
Grallipeza nebulosa

== Species ==
These 47 species belong to the genus Grallipeza:

- Grallipeza abeja^{g}
- Grallipeza acutivitta (Hendel, 1936)^{c g}
- Grallipeza affinis Hennig, 1934^{c g}
- Grallipeza albiterga^{g}
- Grallipeza amazonica (Enderlein, 1922)^{c}
- Grallipeza arcuata Hennig, 1934^{c g}
- Grallipeza auriornata Hennig, 1934^{c g}
- Grallipeza baracoa (Cresson, 1926)^{c}
- Grallipeza callangana Enderlein, 1922^{c g}
- Grallipeza cantata Cresson, 1926^{c g}
- Grallipeza cliffi^{g}
- Grallipeza cristulata Cresson, 1926^{c g}
- Grallipeza ecuadoriensis Enderlein, 1922^{c g}
- Grallipeza elegans Hennig, 1934^{c g}
- Grallipeza flavicaudata Cresson, 1926^{c g}
- Grallipeza footei Cresson, 1926^{c g}
- Grallipeza gracilis Hennig, 1934^{c g}
- Grallipeza grenada^{g}
- Grallipeza hyaloptera Hendel, 1936^{c g}
- Grallipeza imbecilla Enderlein, 1922^{c g}
- Grallipeza magna Hennig, 1934^{c g}
- Grallipeza marleyi^{g}
- Grallipeza mellea Williston, 1896^{c g}
- Grallipeza nebulosa Loew, 1866^{c g b}
- Grallipeza nigrinotata Hennig, 1934^{c g}
- Grallipeza nigrivitta^{g}
- Grallipeza obscura Hennig, 1934^{c g}
- Grallipeza ornatithorax Enderlein, 1922^{c g}
- Grallipeza pallidefasciata Macquart, 1855^{c g}
- Grallipeza panamensis Cresson, 1926^{c g}
- Grallipeza paraplacida^{g}
- Grallipeza perezi^{g}
- Grallipeza placida Loew, 1866^{c g}
- Grallipeza placidoides (Cresson, 1926)^{g}
- Grallipeza placioides Cresson, 1926^{c g}
- Grallipeza pleuritica Johnson, 1894^{c g}
- Grallipeza pronigra Hennig, 1934^{c g}
- Grallipeza pseudosimplex Hennig, 1934^{c g}
- Grallipeza pulchrifrons Cresson, 1926^{c g}
- Grallipeza russula Wulp, 1897^{c g}
- Grallipeza scurra Enderlein, 1922^{c g}
- Grallipeza spinuliger Cresson, 1926^{c g}
- Grallipeza suavis Enderlein, 1922^{c g}
- Grallipeza turba^{g}
- Grallipeza unifasciata Fabricius, 1805^{c g}
- Grallipeza unimaculata Macquart, 1846^{c g}
- Grallipeza vicina Hennig, 1934^{c g}

Data sources: i = ITIS, c = Catalogue of Life, g = GBIF, b = Bugguide.net
