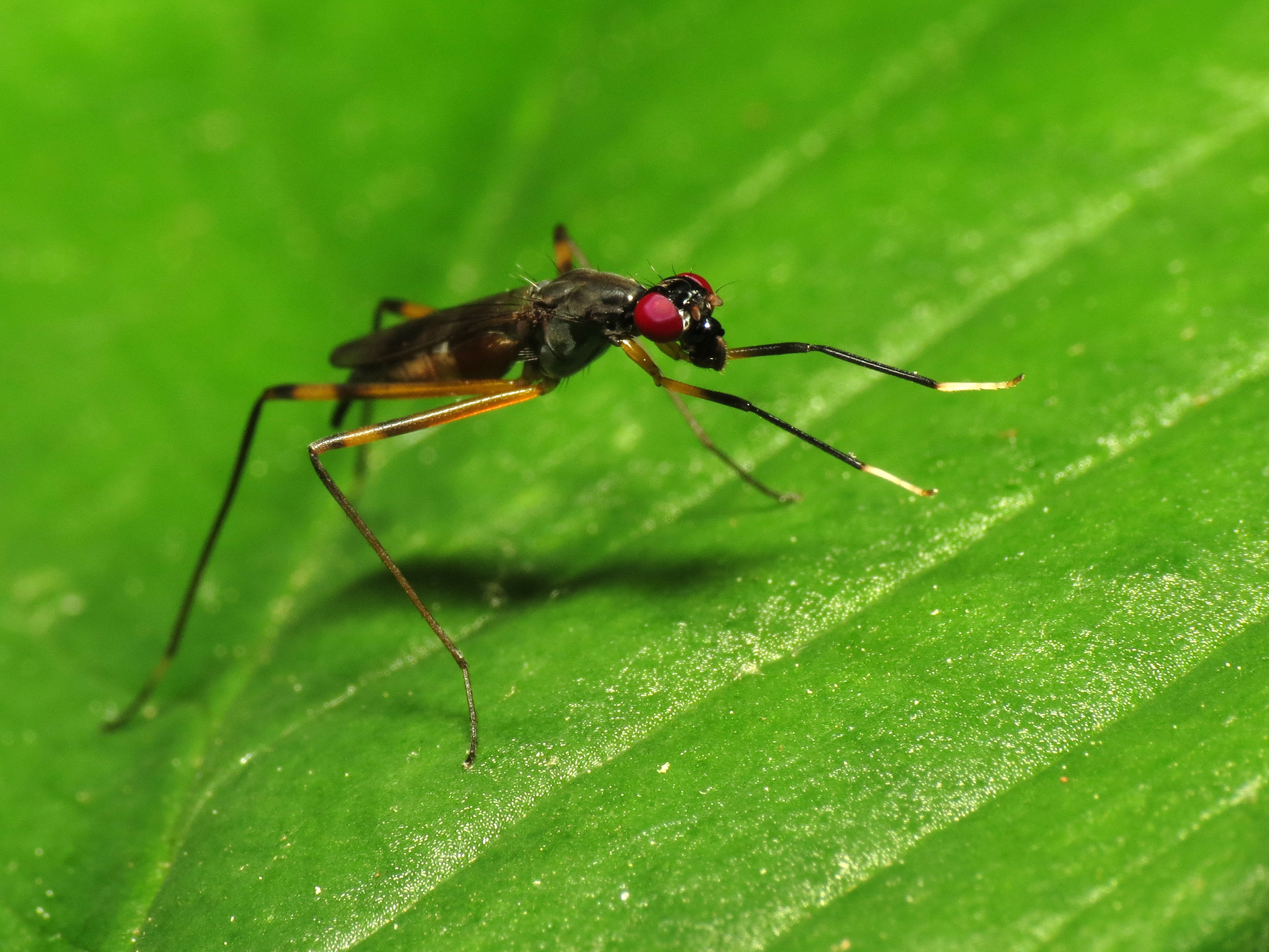

Scientific classification
- Kingdom: Animalia
- Phylum: Arthropoda
- Class: Insecta
- Order: Diptera
- Family: Micropezidae
- Genus: Rainieria
- Species: R. antennaepes

Binomial name
- Rainieria antennaepes (Say, 1823)

Synonyms
- Calobata antennaepes Say, 1823

= Rainieria antennaepes =

Species of fly

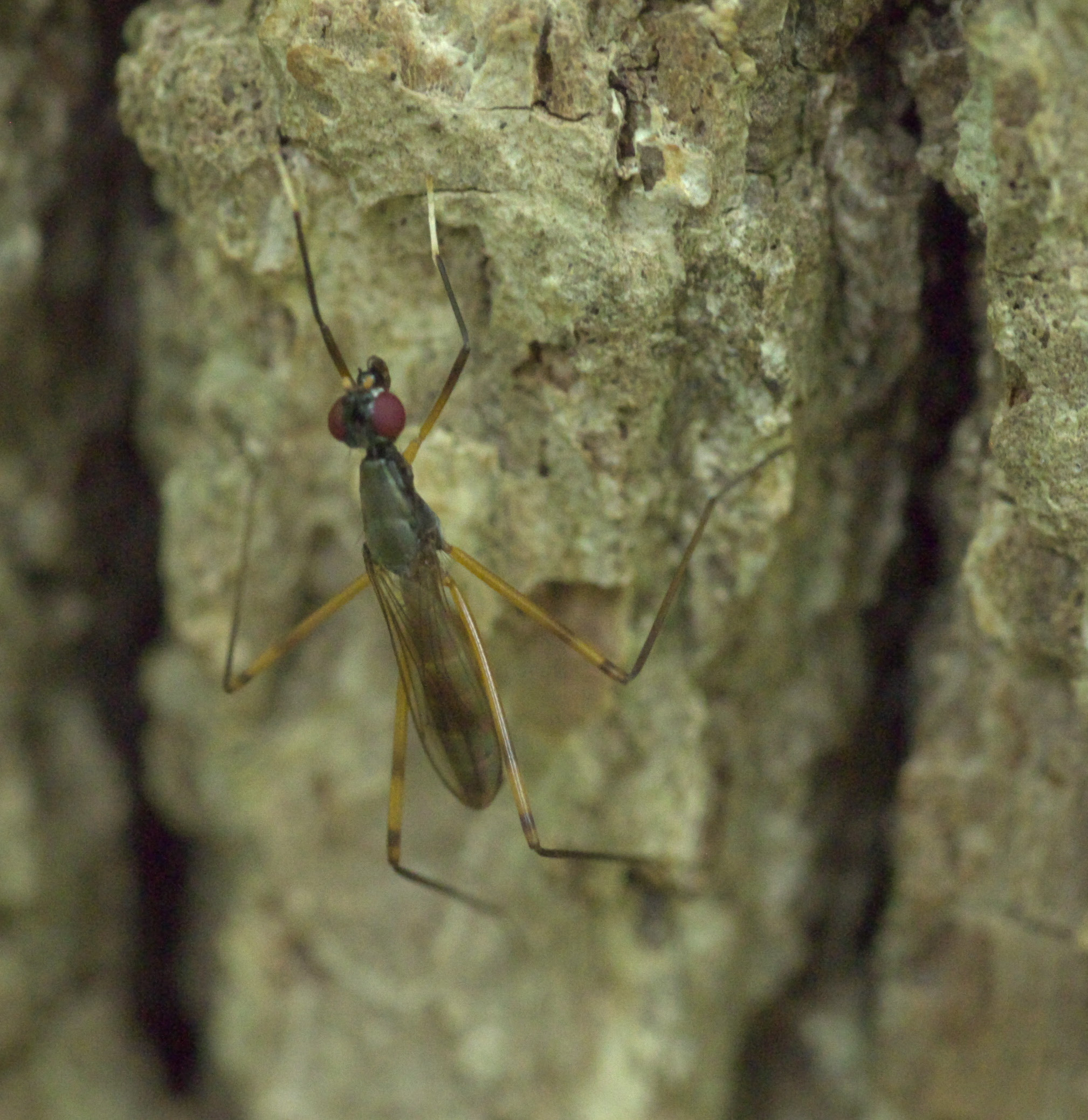
Rainieria antennaepes

Rainieria antennaepes is a species of stilt-legged flies in the family Micropezidae found in North America east of the Rocky Mountains. The name "antennaepes" means "antenna foot". They frequently hold their white-tipped front legs up and wave them around in a manner that makes them appear like the antennae of ichneumonid wasps. They feed on detritus, bird droppings, and similar waste.

Rainieria antennaepes is the only member of its genus found in North America.
