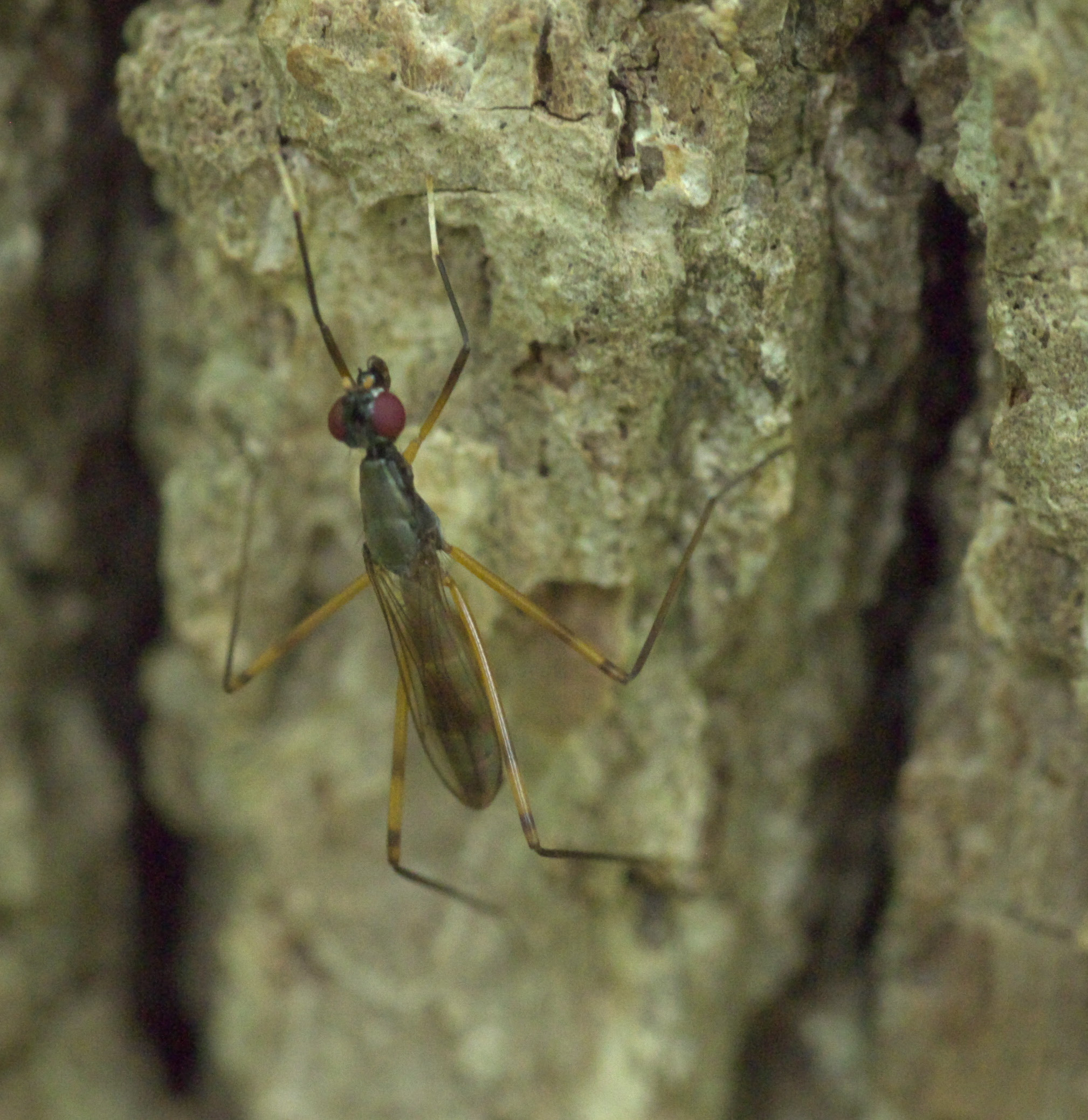
- Rainieria antennaepes

Scientific classification
- Domain: Eukaryota
- Kingdom: Animalia
- Phylum: Arthropoda
- Class: Insecta
- Order: Diptera
- Family: Micropezidae
- Subfamily: Taeniapterinae
- Genus: Rainieria; Rondani, 1843

= Rainieria =

Genus of flies

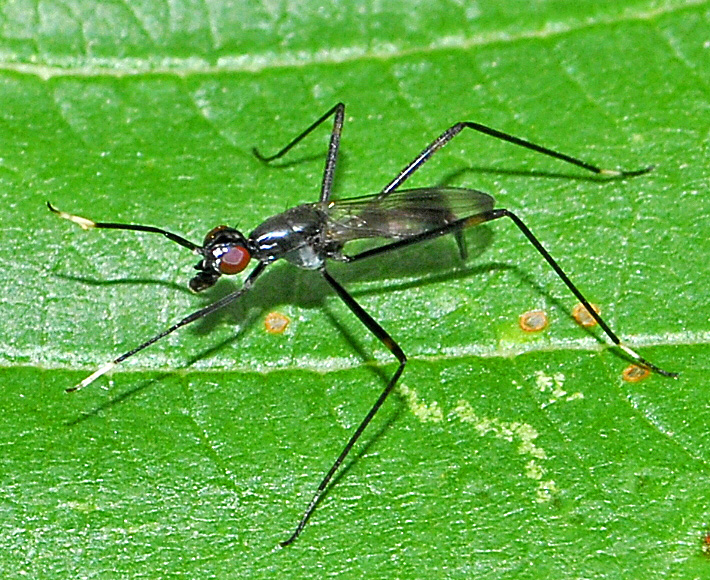
Rainieria calceata

Rainieria is a genus of stilt-legged flies in the family Micropezidae. There are at least 20 described species in Rainieria.

== Species ==
These 25 species belong to the genus Rainieria:

- Rainieria alternata Cresson, 1926^{c g}
- Rainieria andorum Hennig, 1935^{c g}
- Rainieria antennaepes (Say, 1823)^{i c g b}
- Rainieria boliviana Hennig, 1935^{c g}
- Rainieria boninensis (Hennig, 1935)^{c g}
- Rainieria brasiliana (Rondani, 1863)^{c g}
- Rainieria brunneipes (Cresson, 1938)^{c g}
- Rainieria calceata (Fallén, 1820)^{c g}
- Rainieria calosoma Bigot, 1886^{c g}
- Rainieria gilvimana (Cresson, 1926)^{c g}
- Rainieria hennigi Krivosheina & Krivosheina, 1996^{c g}
- Rainieria latifrons (Loew, 1870)^{c g}
- Rainieria leucochira Czerny, 1932^{c g}
- Rainieria obscura (Hennig, 1935)^{c}
- Rainieria paraffinis Hennig, 1935^{c g}
- Rainieria peruana Enderlein, 1922^{c g}
- Rainieria plectilis Giglio-Tos, 1893^{c g}
- Rainieria postica Curran, 1932^{c g}
- Rainieria pygmaea Hennig, 1935^{c g}
- Rainieria rubella (Wulp, 1897)^{c g}
- Rainieria soccata Enderlein, 1922^{c g}
- Rainieria tritaeniolata Enderlein, 1922^{c g}
- Rainieria uda Cresson, 1930^{c g}
- Rainieria uniformis Hennig, 1935^{c g}
- Rainieria wiedemanni (Enderlein, 1922)^{c g}

Data sources: i = ITIS, c = Catalogue of Life, g = GBIF, b = Bugguide.net
