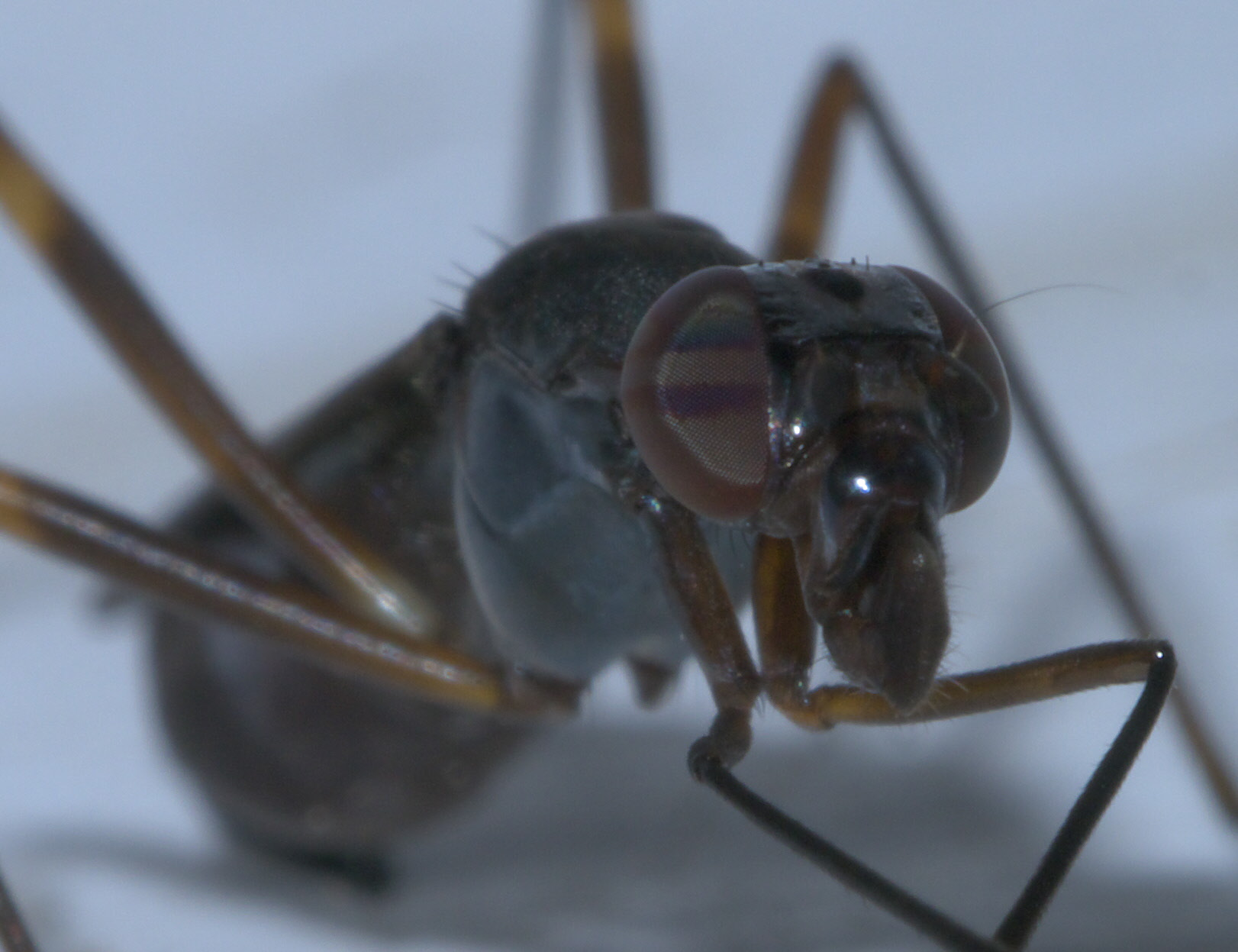

Scientific classification
- Domain: Eukaryota
- Kingdom: Animalia
- Phylum: Arthropoda
- Class: Insecta
- Order: Diptera
- Family: Micropezidae
- Genus: Taeniaptera
- Species: T. trivittata

Binomial name
- Taeniaptera trivittata Macquart, 1835

Synonyms
- Calobata albimana Macquart, 1843; Calobata valida Walker, 1852; Taeniaptera divaricata Cresson, 1914

= Taeniaptera trivittata =

Species of fly

Taeniaptera trivittata is a species of stilt-legged flies in the family Micropezidae.

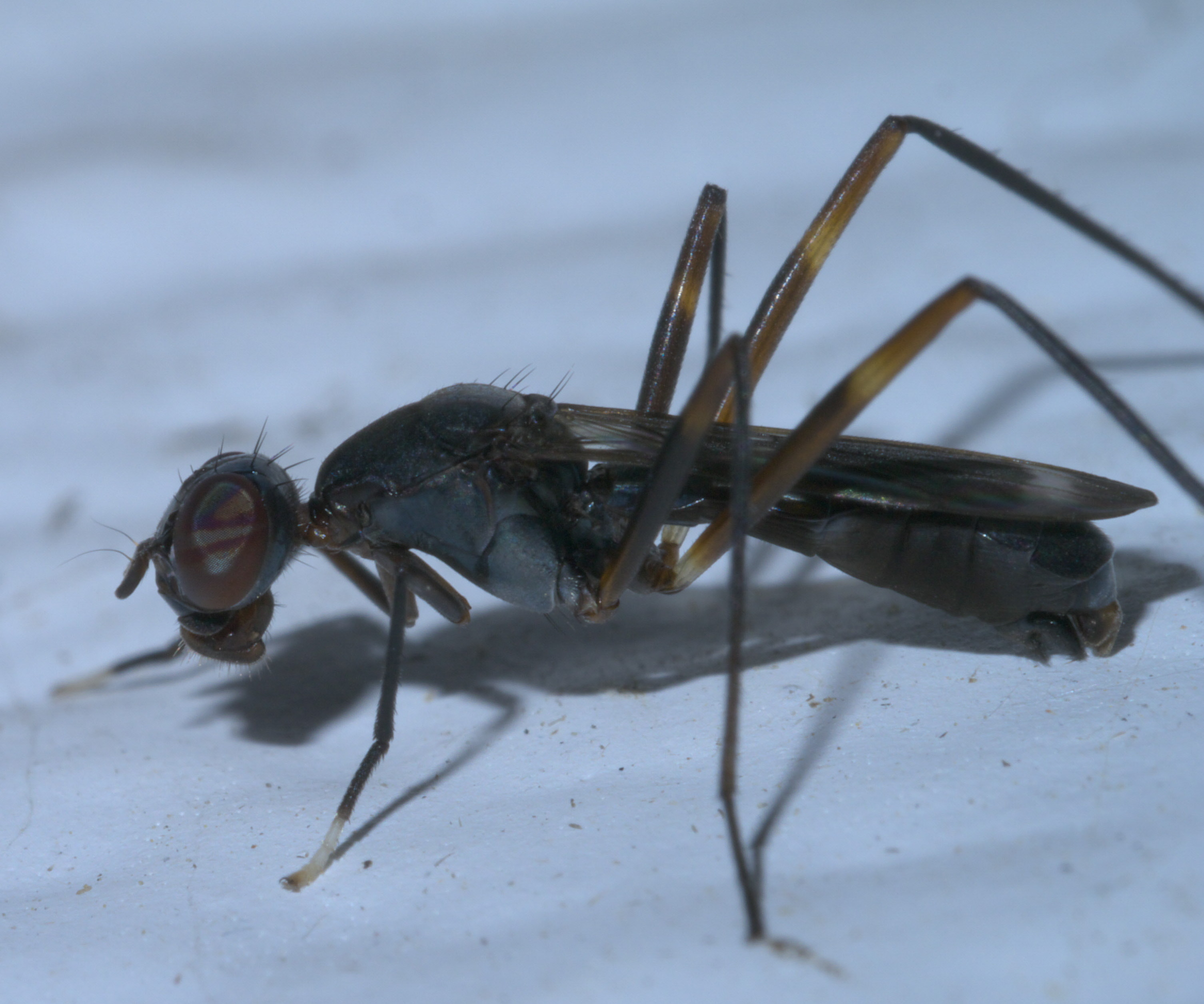
Taeniaptera trivittata, Pryor, OK, USA

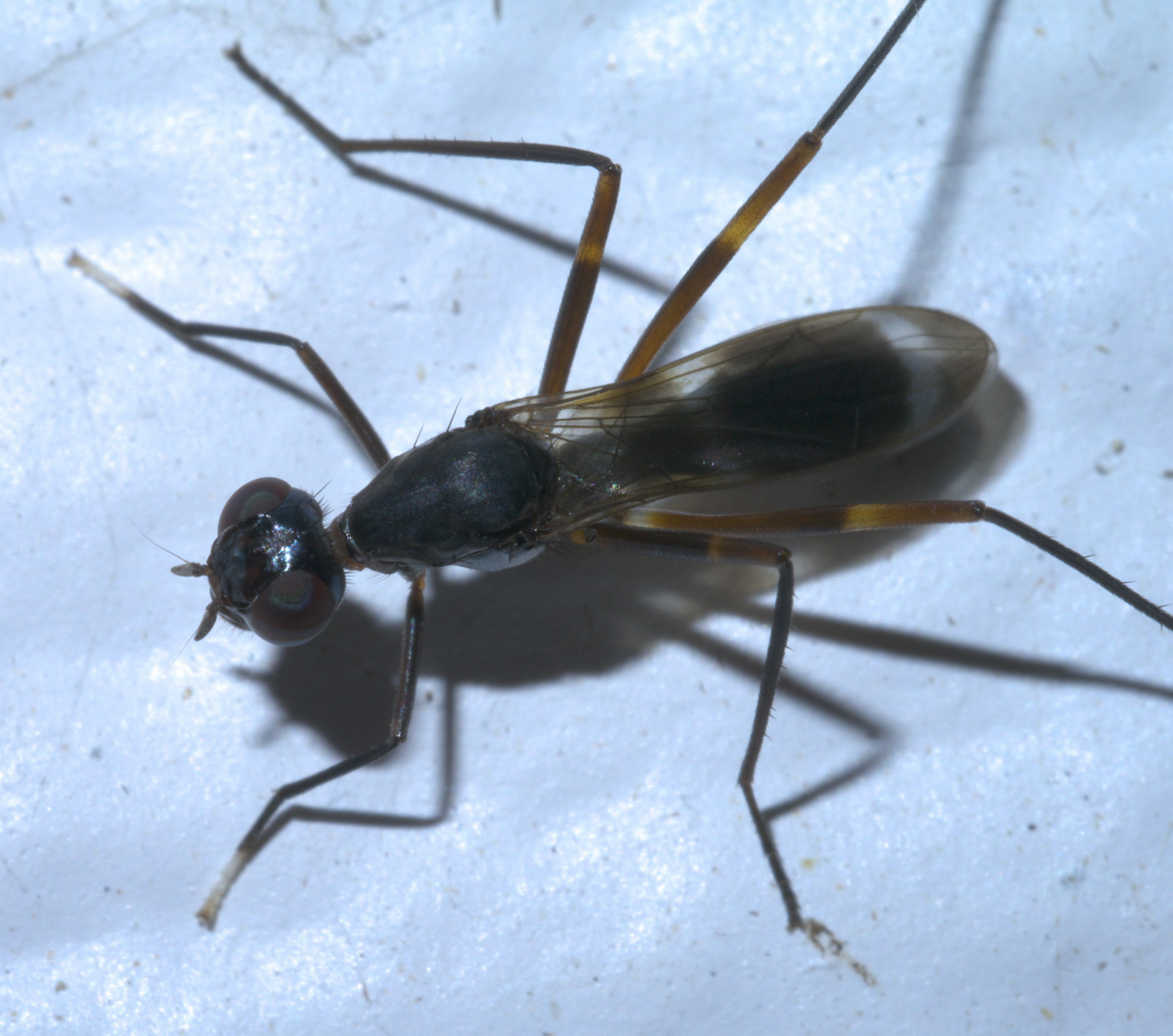
Taeniaptera trivittata, Pryor, OK, USA
