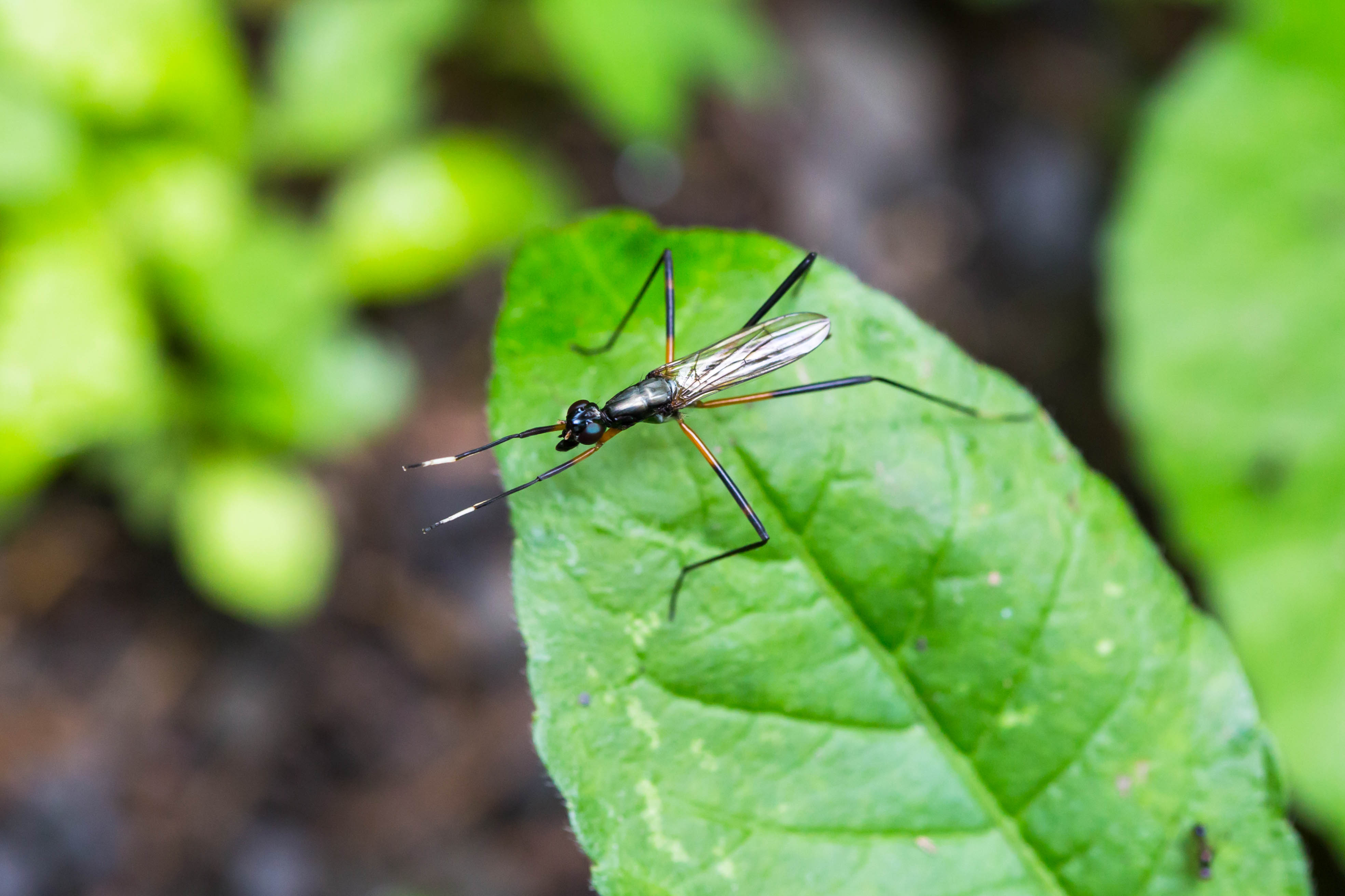
- Calobatina geometra

Scientific classification
- Kingdom: Animalia
- Phylum: Arthropoda
- Clade: Pancrustacea
- Class: Insecta
- Order: Diptera
- Family: Micropezidae
- Subfamily: Taeniapterinae
- Genus: Calobatina; Enderlein, 1922

Type species
- Lauxania texana Enderlein, 1922

Synonyms
- Meganeria Cresson, 1926

= Calobatina =

Genus of flies

Calobatina is a genus of stilt-legged flies in the family Micropezidae.

== Species ==
- Calobatina geometra (Robineau-Desvoidy, 1830)
