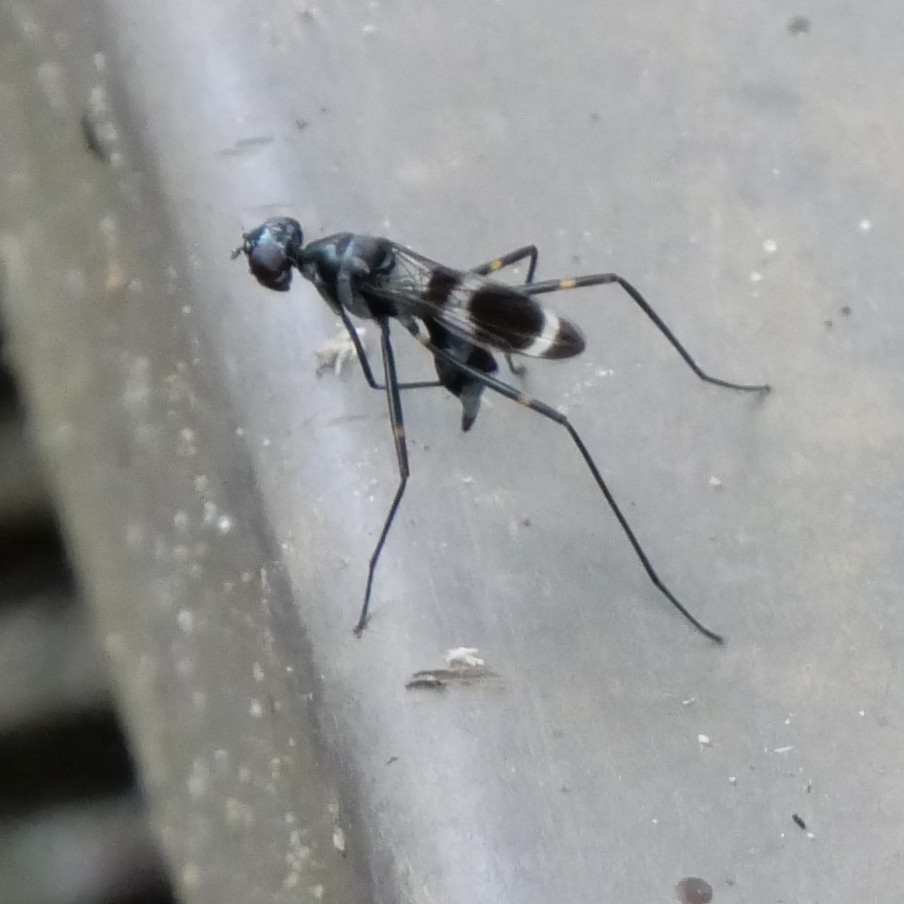

Scientific classification
- Kingdom: Animalia
- Phylum: Arthropoda
- Clade: Pancrustacea
- Class: Insecta
- Order: Diptera
- Family: Micropezidae
- Genus: Mimegralla
- Species: M. australica

Binomial name
- Mimegralla australica Hennig, 1935

= Mimegralla australica =

Long-legged fly species

Mimegralla australica, the black stilt-legged fly, is a species of long legged flies in the family Micropezidae. Flies in this family are known as stilt-legged flies.

== Description ==
Their bodies are slender with a black and white pattern on the wings. The front pair of legs have white tips on the end.

== Range ==
They are found in Australia, with their main distribution in eastern Queensland and north New South Wales, but there have also been a few records from other Australian states
