= Taeniaptera feei =

Scientific classification
- Domain: Eukaryota
- Kingdom: Animalia
- Phylum: Arthropoda
- Class: Insecta
- Order: Diptera
- Family: Micropezidae
- Genus: Taeniaptera
- Species: T. feei

Binomial name
- Taeniaptera feei Steyskal, 1986

Species of fly

Taeniaptera feei, the palm grove stilt-legged fly, is a species of stilt-legged fly in the family Micropezidae.
