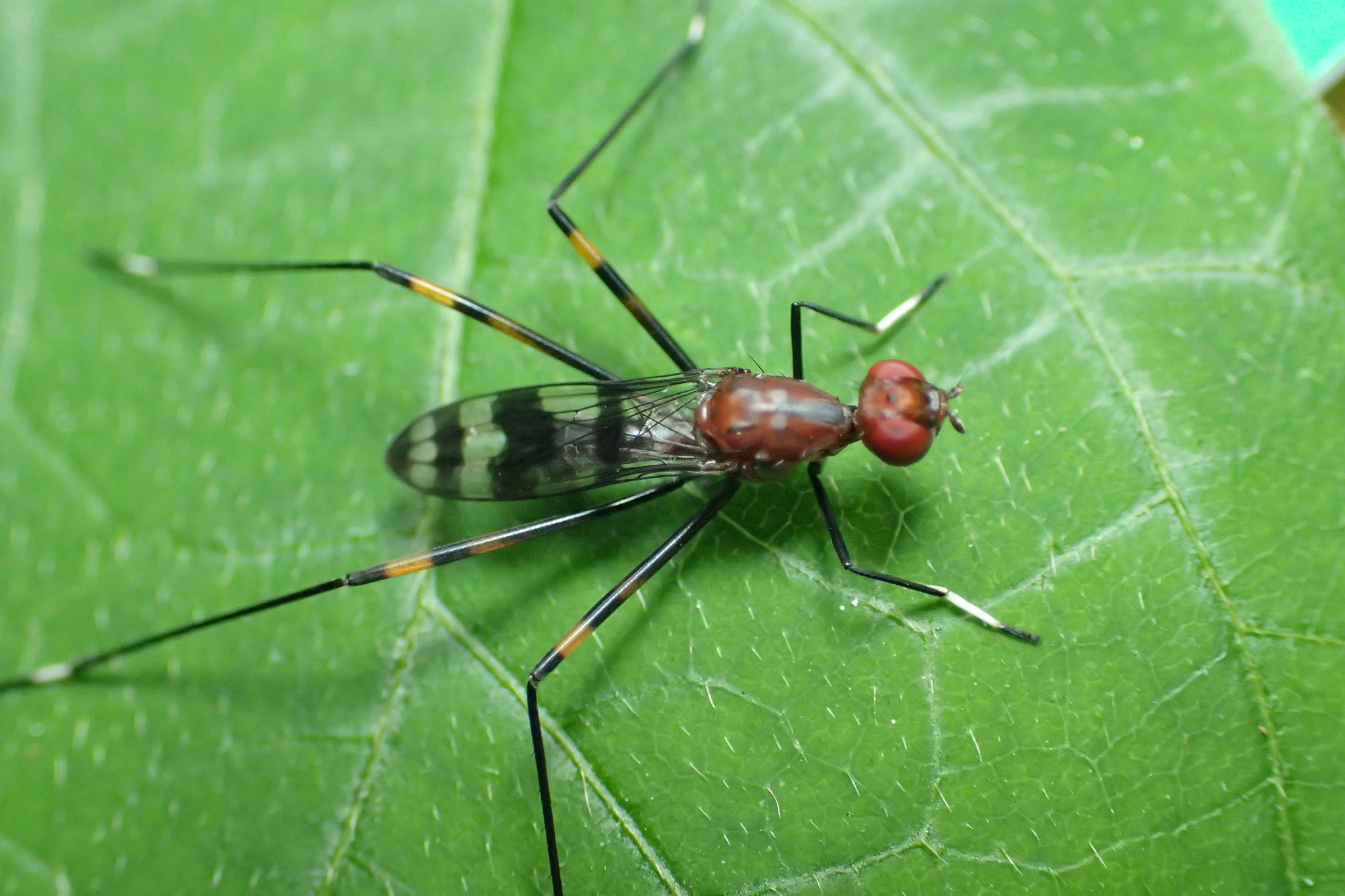
- Hoplocheiloma perforatum

Scientific classification
- Domain: Eukaryota
- Kingdom: Animalia
- Phylum: Arthropoda
- Class: Insecta
- Order: Diptera
- Family: Micropezidae
- Subfamily: Taeniapterinae

= Taeniapterinae =

Subfamily of flies

Taeniapterinae is a subfamily of flies in the family Micropezidae. There are at least 9 described species in Taeniapterinae.

== Genera ==
- Calobatina Enderlein, 1922
- Grallipeza Rondani, 1850
- Hoplocheiloma Cresson, 1926
- Rainieria Rondani, 1843
- Taeniaptera Macquart, 1835
